= S22 (ZVV) =

Railway service in Switzerland

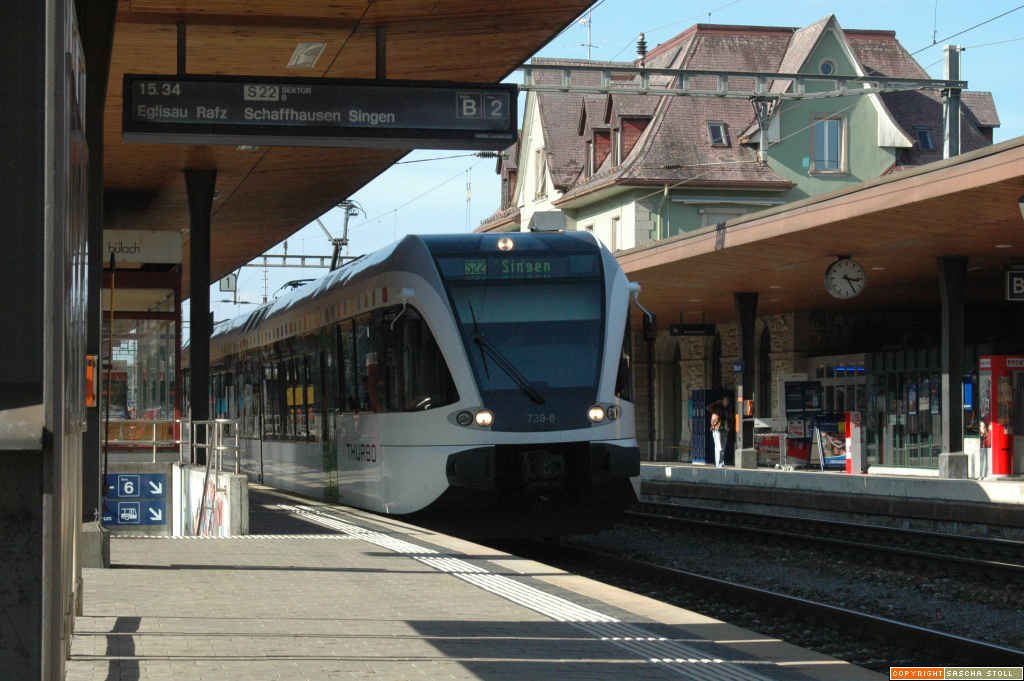
- A THURBO Stadler GTW S22 train at Bülach.

Overview
- Status: Historical
- Locale: Zürich, Switzerland
- Termini: Bülach; Singen (Hohentwiel)
- Website: ZVV (in English)

Service
- Type: S-Bahn
- System: Zürich S-Bahn
- Operator(s): Zürcher Verkehrsverbund (ZVV)
- Rolling stock: THURBO Stadler GTW

Technical
- Track gauge: 1,435 mm (4 ft 8 1/2 in)

The S22 was a regional railway service of the Zürich S-Bahn on the ZVV (Zürich transportation network). It connected the cantons of Zürich and Schaffhausen, Switzerland, with the state of Baden-Württemberg, Germany. At the end of 2015, the service was shortened from Bülach to Jestetten and the line no longer fell under the purview of ZVV, but continued to be operated by THURBO. Later S22 got replaced by a S-Bahn line from the Schaffhausen S-Bahn. The service from Schaffhausen to Singen was taken over by Deutsche Bahn (and in December 2022 by SBB GmbH, respectively), and the section between Bülach and Schaffhausen is now covered by ZVV service S9.

== Route ==
The line ran from Bülach, in the canton of Zürich, via Schaffhausen, canton of Schaffhausen, to Singen (Hohentwiel) in Germany. It served the following stations:

- Bülach
- Glattfelden
- Eglisau
- Hüntwangen-Wil
- Rafz

Swiss-German border

- Lottstetten
- Jestetten
- Altenburg Rheinau (until 12 December 2010)

Swiss-German border

- Neuhausen
- Schaffhausen
- Herblingen
- Thayngen

Swiss-German border

- Bietingen
- Gottmadingen
- Singen (Hohentwiel)

== Rolling stock ==
All services were operated by THURBO Stadler GTW trains.

== See also ==
- Rail transport in Switzerland
- Trams in Zürich
