= Germany–Switzerland border =

International border

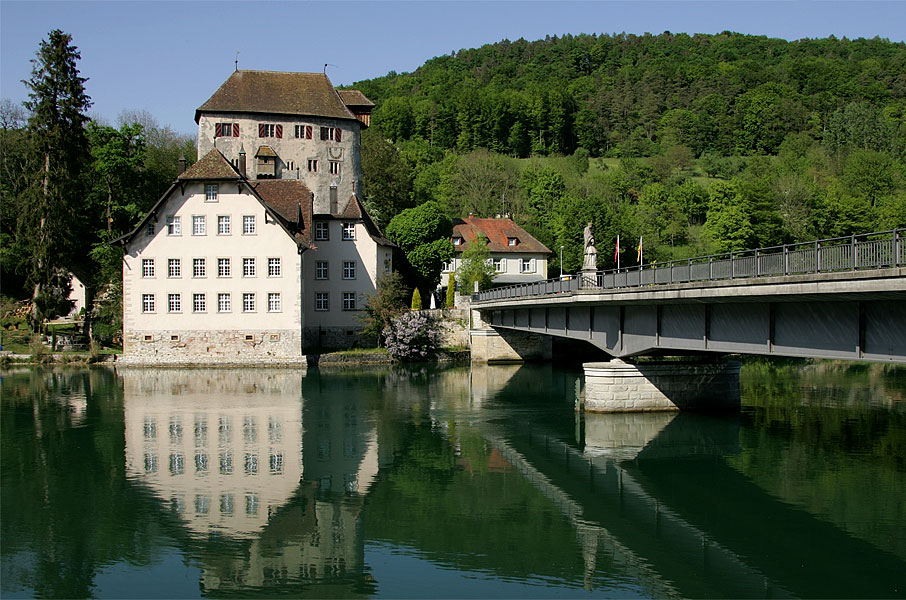
- Rotwasserstelz Castle, Hohentengen am Hochrhein (Germany) as seen across the Rhine from Kaiserstuhl (Switzerland)

Characteristics
- Entities: Germany Switzerland
- Length: 362 km (225 mi)
- Enclave and exclaves: Büsingen am Hochrhein

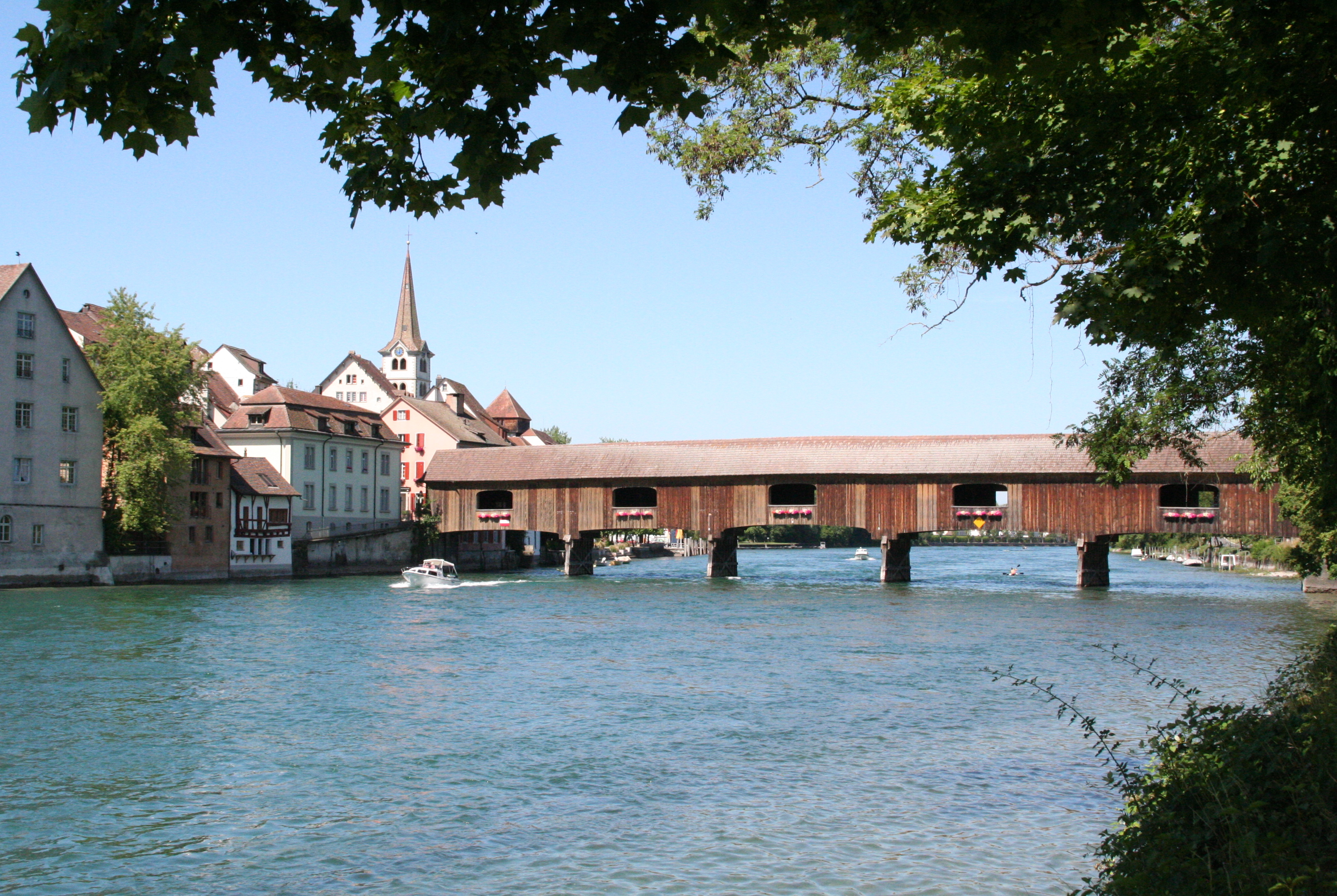
Historic Rhine bridge between Diessenhofen (left) and Gailingen (right), completed in 1816

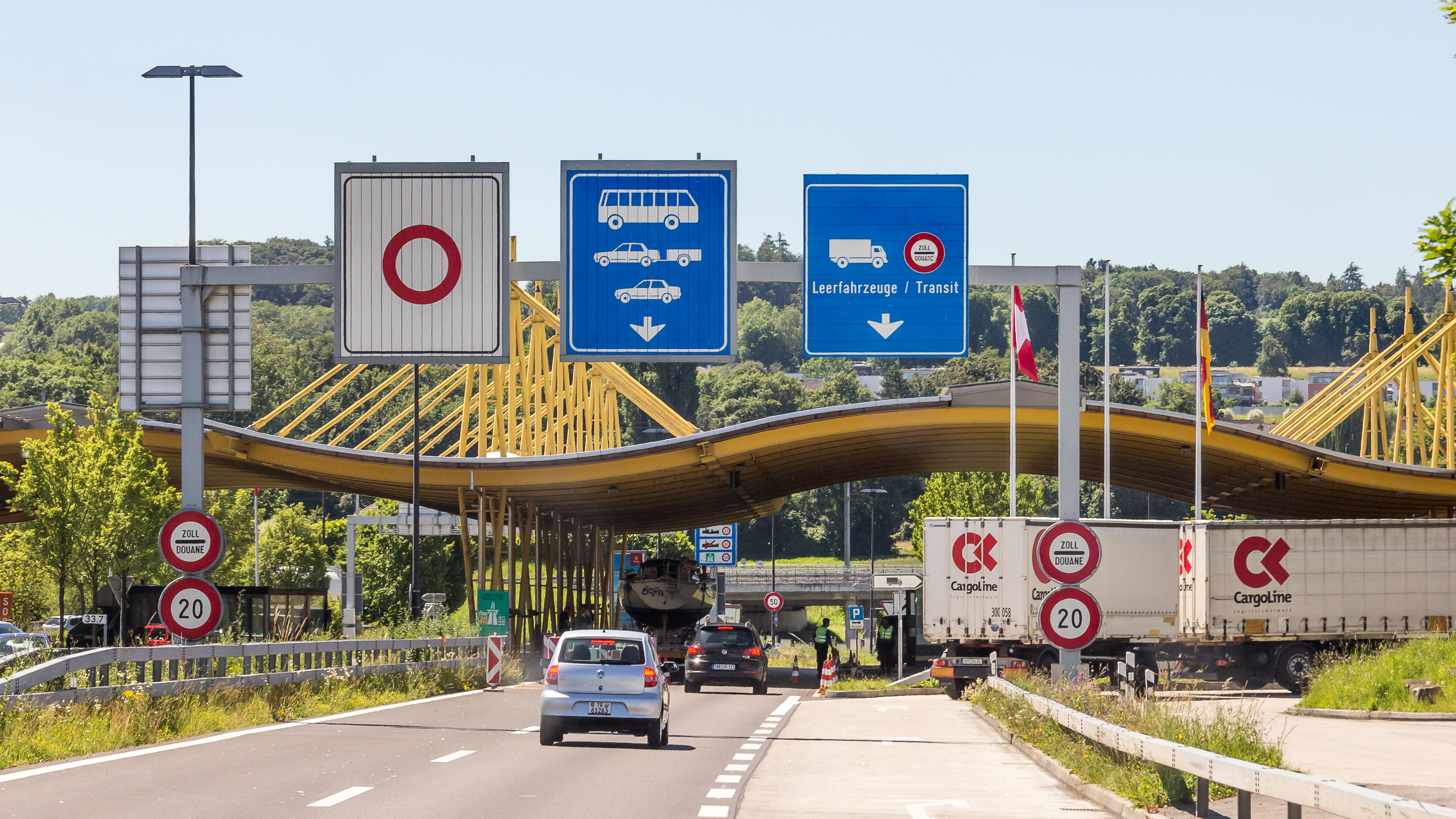
Customs facilities between Konstanz (Germany) and Kreuzlingen (Switzerland)

The border between the modern states of Germany and Switzerland extends to 362 kilometres (225 mi), mostly following Lake Constance and the High Rhine (Hochrhein), with territories to the north mostly belonging to Germany and territories to the south mainly to Switzerland. Exceptions are the Swiss canton of Schaffhausen, the Rafzerfeld and hamlet of Nohl of the canton of Zürich, Bettingen and Riehen municipalities and part of the city of Basel in the canton of Basel-City (these regions of Switzerland all lie north of the High Rhine) and the old town of the German city of Konstanz, which is located south of the Seerhein. The canton of Schaffhausen is located almost entirely on the northern side of the High Rhine, with the exception of the southern part of the municipality of Stein am Rhein. The German municipality of Büsingen am Hochrhein is an enclave surrounded by Swiss territory.

== Economy ==
Much of the border is within the sphere of the Zurich metropolitan area and there is substantial traffic, both for commuting and for shopping, across the border, with the S-Bahn services S9 and S36 (and the former S22) of Zürich S-Bahn, three lines of Schaffhausen S-Bahn and one line of Aargau S-Bahn running through Swiss and German territory. The Swiss municipality of Kreuzlingen forms part of the conurbation of Konstanz, with cross-border regional train services S14 and S44 of St. Gallen S-Bahn. Similarly, the Trinational Eurodistrict of Basel includes territory in both France and Germany (with Basel S-Bahn services S5, S6, RB27 and RB30 and Basel tram line 8 also operating across the Swiss-German border). As of 2023, there are 64,934 cross-border commuters between Germany and Switzerland.

== History ==
The High Rhine has had the character of being mostly the northern border of the Old Swiss Confederacy since the Swabian War and the accession of Basel and Schaffhausen in 1499–1501, dividing the Swiss Confederacy from the Swabian Circle of the Holy Roman Empire; with the Peace of Westphalia of 1648, the border acquired the status of an international border de jure.

With minor changes (such as the acquisition of Rafzerfeld in 1651), it remained unchanged since, even throughout the Napoleonic era when it divided two French client states (Cisrhenian Republic and Helvetic Republic) and later the Confederation of the Rhine from the restored Swiss Confederacy, and eventually the German Confederation from modern Switzerland. The border persisted even during the Nazi era (although with the Anschluss of Austria, the German-Swiss border technically included the Austrian-Swiss border from 1938 and until the formation of the German Federal Republic in 1949).

On 12 December 2008 Switzerland implemented the Schengen Agreement. This removed all passport controls for travellers crossing the border; however, customs officers from both countries are still authorised to carry out customs checks on border crossers, as Switzerland is not in the EU Customs Union.

In mid-2016, during the European migrant crisis, the German government deployed an additional 90 border guards and 40 police officers in order to reduce the level of illegal immigration passing through Switzerland.

== Transportation ==
Since Switzerland's accession to the Schengen Area in 2008, there have been no permanent passport controls along this border. Customs controls are still in operation since Switzerland is not part of the European Customs Union.

=== Railway ===
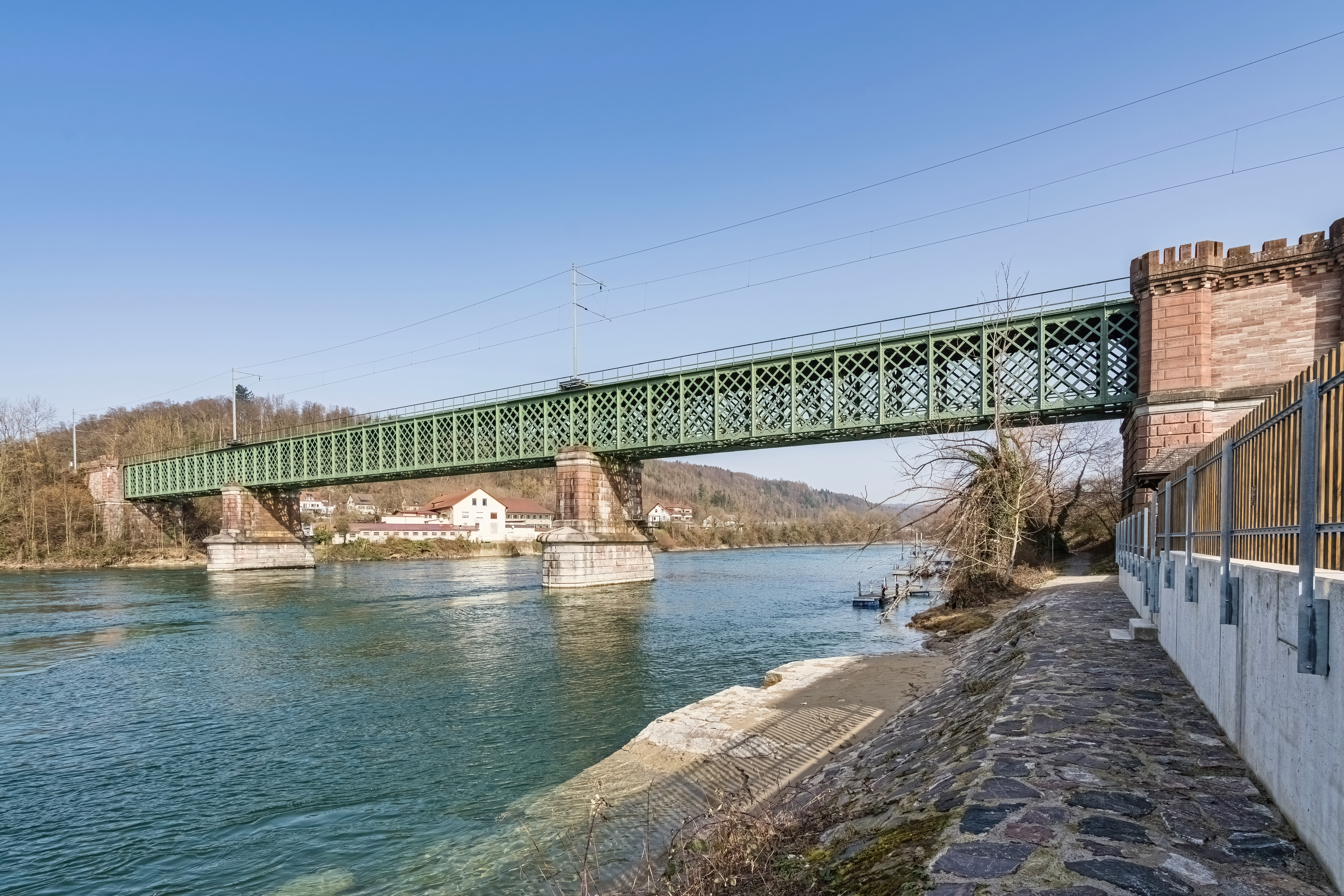
Waldshut–Koblenz railway bridge over the High Rhine between Germany (left) and Switzerland (right)

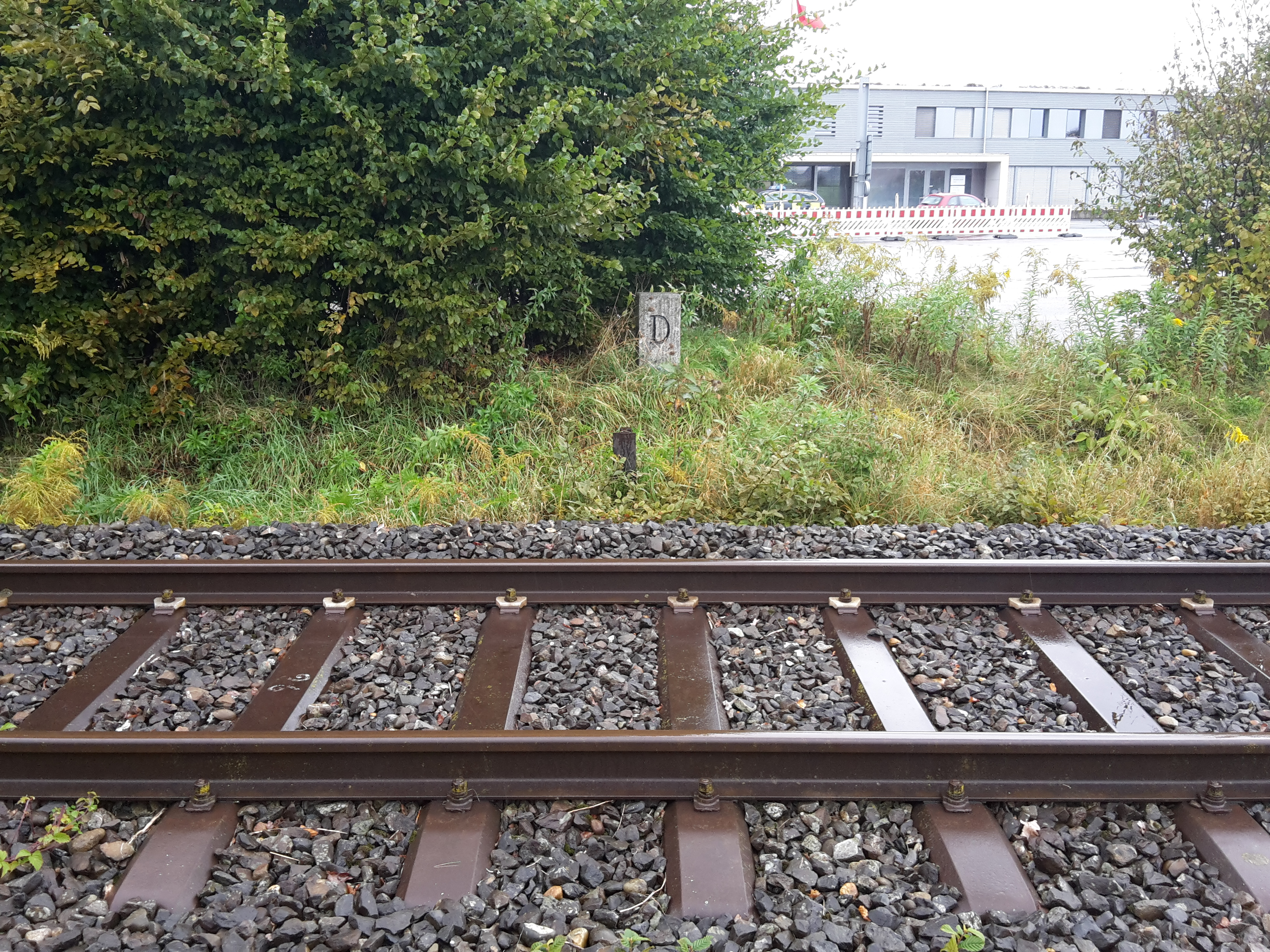
Boundary stone along the track of the Etzwilen–Singen railway

As of the December 2023 timetable change, railway lines crossing the border are (from West to East):

- Rhine Valley Railway between Basel Bad Bf and Weil am Rhein (served by RB27, EC, ICE, IC)
- Wiese Valley Railway between Basel Bad Bf and Lörrach Hauptbahnhof (served by S5, S6)
- High Rhine Railway between Basel Bad Bf and Grenzach (served by RB30, RE 3)
- Turgi–Koblenz–Waldshut railway between Koblenz and Waldshut (served by S27, S36)
- High Rhine Railway between Erzingen and Trasadingen (served by S64, RE 3)
- Eglisau–Neuhausen railway line between Rafz and Lottstetten (served by S9, RE48, IC87)
- Eglisau–Neuhausen railway line between Altenburg-Rheinau and Neuhausen Rheinfall (served by S9, S65, RE48, IC87)
- High Rhine Railway between Thayngen and Bietingen (served by S62, RE 3, IC87)
- Etzwilen–Singen railway between Etzwilen and Singen (Hohentwiel) (a heritage railway).
- Lake Line between Konstanz and Kreuzlingen (served by S14, S44, IR75) and between Konstanz and Kreuzlingen Hafen (served by RE1)
- St. Margrethen–Lauterach railway and Vorarlberg Railway lines between St. Margrethen and Lindau-Reutin, over Austrian territory (S7, EC / ECE).

Some railway stations are border stations, where there are customs and previously passport control of both countries in the building. Such stations include Basel Badischer Bahnhof (located on Swiss territory near the border, but operated as a German station) and Konstanz station. It is possible to change trains without going through any border or customs control. Cross-border regional train services around Lake Constance (Bodensee) are part of Bodensee S-Bahn.

=== Tram and bus ===
A tram line and two bus lines offer cross-border services. The Basel tram line 8 was in 2014 extended across the border to Weil am Rhein in Germany. Verkehrsbetriebe Schaffhausen (vbsh) bus line 25, operating between Schaffhausen and Ramsen via the German enclave of Büsingen am Hochrhein, crosses the border four times in one journey. Another bus service, line 33 (7349) of Südbadenbus, connects Stein am Rhein with Singen (Hohentwiel) railway station.

=== Ferries and boats ===
Several passenger boat lines connect German and Swiss harbours on Lake Constance (and also harbours in Austria), among others a car ferry between Friedrichshafen and Romanshorn. Until 1976, there were also train ferries in operation across Lake Constance. There are also passenger boat lines on the lower High Rhine and between Schaffhausen and Kreuzlingen.

== Geography ==
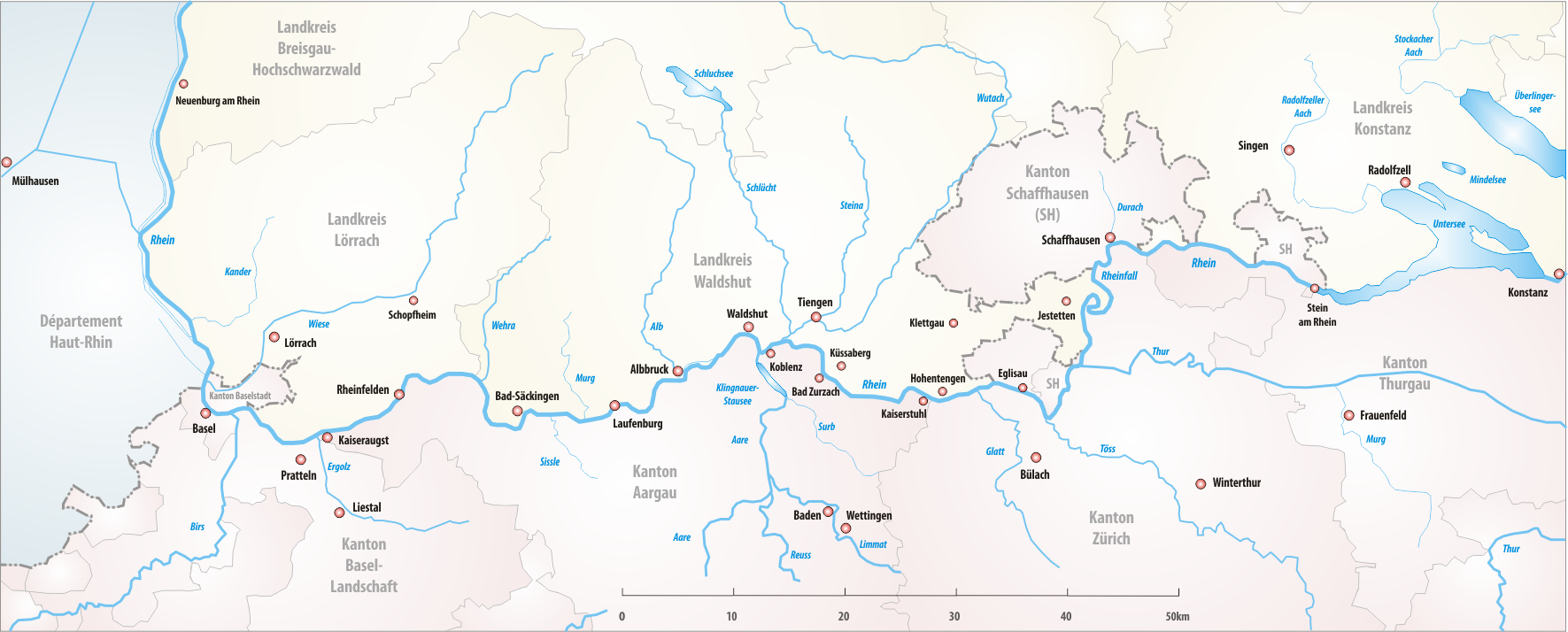
Map of the High Rhine

The German-Swiss border begins in the east at the German-Swiss-Austrian tripoint, located within Lake Constance. The precise location of the border within Lake Constance has never been agreed upon officially. The official Swiss national map of 1938 did mark it, at 47.5442°N 9.5636°E, but maps made since the 1960s have avoided showing the border in the interior of the lake to reflect the lack of an official agreement. The Upper Lake Constance separates the German Bodenseekreis (Baden-Württemberg) and Lindau district (Bavaria) from the Swiss cantons of Thurgau and St. Gallen.

The border makes landfall south of the city of Konstanz, at 47.6560°N 9.1817°E. The short stretch of border (c. 1.5 kilometres (0.93 mi)) between Konstanz and the municipality of Kreuzlingen comprises the only territory of Germany on the left bank of the High Rhine.

The border then follows the western section of the Seerhein north of Tägermoos (part of Switzerland but within the Gemarkung of Konstanz) and Gottlieben. The border then runs through the Rheinsee part of Untersee, passing south of Reichenau Island. At the lake's exit it turns inland, towards the north, leaving Stein am Rhein within Switzerland, as well as the municipalities of Ramsen, Hemishofen and Buch (eastern part of the canton of Schaffhausen). It then returns to the Rhine, including Gailingen in the Konstanz district of Germany, but then turns north again to include the bulk of the canton of Schaffhausen, a right-bank territory including the town of Schaffhausen itself, in Switzerland, separating it from the German Schwarzwald-Baar-Kreis and Waldshut district. Büsingen am Hochrhein (Konstanz district) is a German exclave which has borders with three Swiss cantons, namely Zurich, Schaffhausen, and Thurgau.

West of Schaffhausen, the border follows the Wutach Valley. It then returns to the Rhine ca. 1.5 kilometres (0.93 mi) downstream of the Rhine Falls (south of the hamlet of Nohl), then separating the Waldshut district from the canton of Zürich, but then deviates from the river again to include the Rafzerfeld plain into Zürich's Bülach district (a right-bank territory historically acquired by the city of Zürich from the counts of Sulz in 1651) and the southern part of the canton of Schaffhausen (Rüdlingen and Buchberg). The German territory wedged between the main part of the canton of Schaffhausen and the Rafzerfeld, which includes the municipalities of Jestetten, Lottstetten and Dettighofen, is also known as the Jestetter Zipfel (lit. 'Jestetten corner').

Downstream of Eglisau, the border then sticks to the course of the Rhine until it east of the city of Basel, forming the northern border of the canton of Aargau as far as Kaiseraugst and then of the canton of Basel-Land (municipalities of Pratteln and Muttenz) bordering on the German Lörrach district.

Besides the right-bank part of Basel proper (Lesser Basel or Kleinbasel), the border also includes the right-bank municipalities of Riehen and Bettingen into the canton of Basel-Stadt. West of Riehen, the border runs near the River Wiese, then cuts across the Mannheim–Karlsruhe–Basel railway line and the E35 south of Weil am Rhein and returns to the Rhine, where it terminates in the French-German-Swiss tripoint, dividing into the French-German and the French-Swiss borders. The tripoint is located in the Upper Rhine at 47°35′23″N 7°35′20″E. A monument has been built near it, known as the Dreiländereck (lit. 'three countries corner').

== See also ==
- Germany–Switzerland relations
