= Eglisau railway station =

Railway station in the canton of Zürich, Switzerland

Eglisau
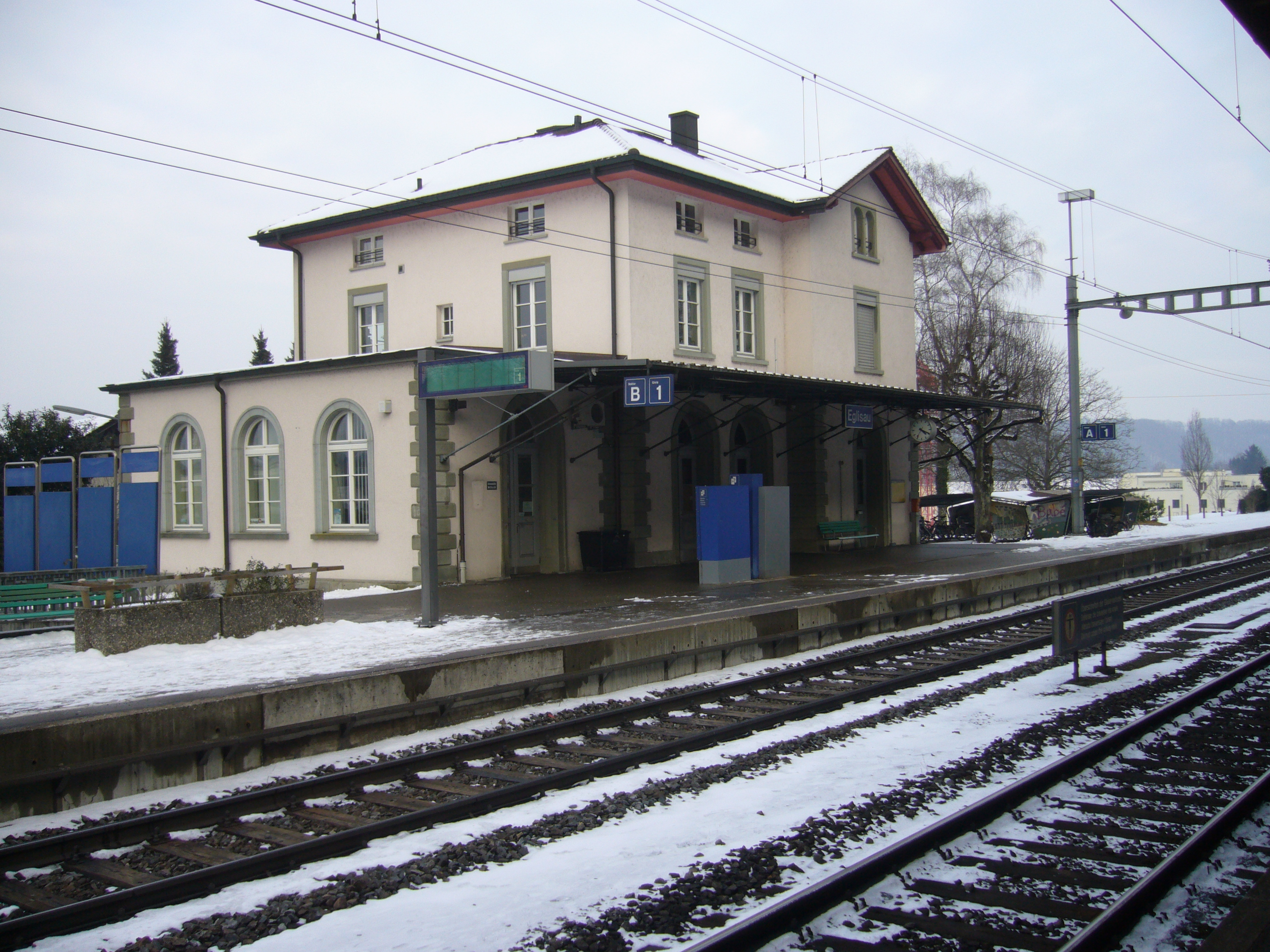
- The station in 2012

General information
- Location: Bahnhofstrasse; Eglisau, Zürich; Switzerland
- Coordinates: 47°34′21″N 8°31′00″E
- Elevation: 390 m (1,280 ft)
- Owner: Swiss Federal Railways
- Lines: Eglisau–Neuhausen line; Winterthur–Bülach–Koblenz line
- Distance: 22.3 km (13.9 mi) from Winterthur
- Platforms: 1 island platform; 1 side platform
- Tracks: 3
- Train operators: Swiss Federal Railways; Thurbo

Other information
- Fare zone: 113 (ZVV)

Passengers
- 2018: 1,900 per working day

Services
Preceding station	Zurich S-Bahn	Following station
Hüntwangen-Wil towards Schaffhausen	S9	Glattfelden towards Uster
Zweidlen towards Waldshut	S36	Bülach Terminus
Hüntwangen-Wil towards Schaffhausen	SN65 Limited service	Glattfelden towards Bülach
Location
- Location within Switzerland Location within Canton of Zurich

Eglisau railway station (German: Bahnhof Eglisau) is a railway station in the Swiss canton of Zurich and municipality of Eglisau. It lies within fare zone 113 of the Zürcher Verkehrsverbund (ZVV). The station is located on the Winterthur to Koblenz line, at that line's junction with the Eglisau to Neuhausen line. Both lines are owned by Swiss Federal Railways.

The railway crosses the Eglisau railway bridge over the Rhine, between Eglisau and the next station, Hüntwangen-Wil, on the Eglisau to Neuhausen line.

== Services ==
As of the December 2020 timetable change, Eglisau railway station is served by Zurich S-Bahn lines S9, between Uster and Rafz/Schaffhausen (via Zurich), and S36, between Bülach and Koblenz:

- Zurich S-Bahn:
  - S9: half-hourly service between Uster and Rafz (via Zürich HB); every other train continues from Rafz to Schaffhausen.
  - S36: hourly service between Waldshut and Bülach.

During weekends, there is also a Nighttime S-Bahn service (SN65) offered by ZVV.

- SN65: hourly service to Bülach and Schaffhausen.

== See also ==
- Rail transport in Switzerland
