= Hüntwangen-Wil railway station =

Railway station in Switzerland

Hüntwangen-Wil
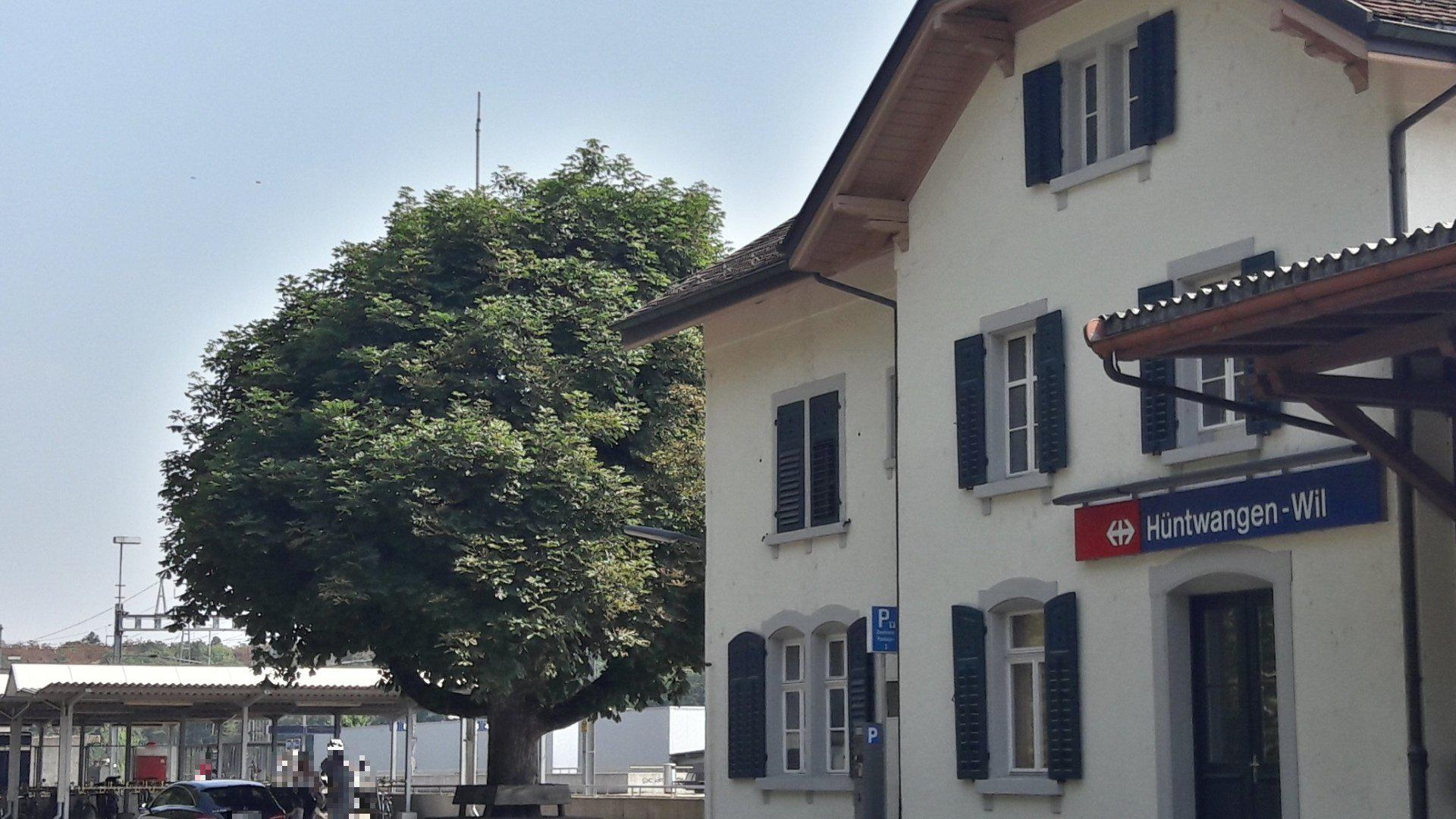
- The station building in 2018

General information
- Location: Bahnhofstrasse; Hüntwangen, Zurich; Switzerland
- Coordinates: 47.581114°N 8.512784°E
- Elevation: 393 m (1,289 ft)
- Owner: Swiss Federal Railways
- Operator: Swiss Federal Railways
- Line: Eglisau to Neuhausen line
- Platforms: 1 island platform
- Tracks: 4
- Connections: Zurich Transport Network (ZVV)
- Bus: PostAuto lines 542 543 546

Other information
- Fare zone: 113 (ZVV)

Services
Preceding station	Zurich S-Bahn	Following station
Rafz towards Schaffhausen	S9	Eglisau towards Uster
Rafz towards Schaffhausen	SN65 Limited service	Eglisau towards Bülach
Location
- Location within Switzerland Location within Canton of Zurich

Hüntwangen-Wil is a railway station in the Swiss canton of Zurich. The station location straddles the municipalities of Eglisau and Hüntwangen, but takes its name from Hüntwangen and the adjoining municipality of Wil. It lies on the Eglisau to Neuhausen line within fare zone 113 of the Zürcher Verkehrsverbund (ZVV).

== Location ==
In terms of railway geography, the station is on the Eglisau to Neuhausen line of Swiss Federal Railways, which crosses the Germany–Switzerland border twice, travelling through German territory, on its route between the Swiss cantons of Zurich and Schaffhausen.

Between Hüntwangen-Wil and the preceding Eglisau station, the railway crosses the Eglisau railway bridge over the Rhine.

== Services ==
Hüntwangen-Wil railway station is operated by Swiss Federal Railways and is an intermediate stop on Zurich S-Bahn line S9, which provides a half-hourly service between Uster and Rafz (via Zurich), with alternate trains continuing to Schaffhausen.

- Zurich S-Bahn line S9: half-hourly service to Uster via Zürich HB and Rafz, hourly service to/from Schaffhausen.

During weekends, there is also a Nighttime S-Bahn service (SN65) offered by ZVV.

- SN65: hourly service to Bülach and Schaffhausen.

It is additionally served by PostAuto bus routes.

== See also ==
- Rail transport in Switzerland
