= Glattfelden railway station =

Railway station in Switzerland

Glattfelden
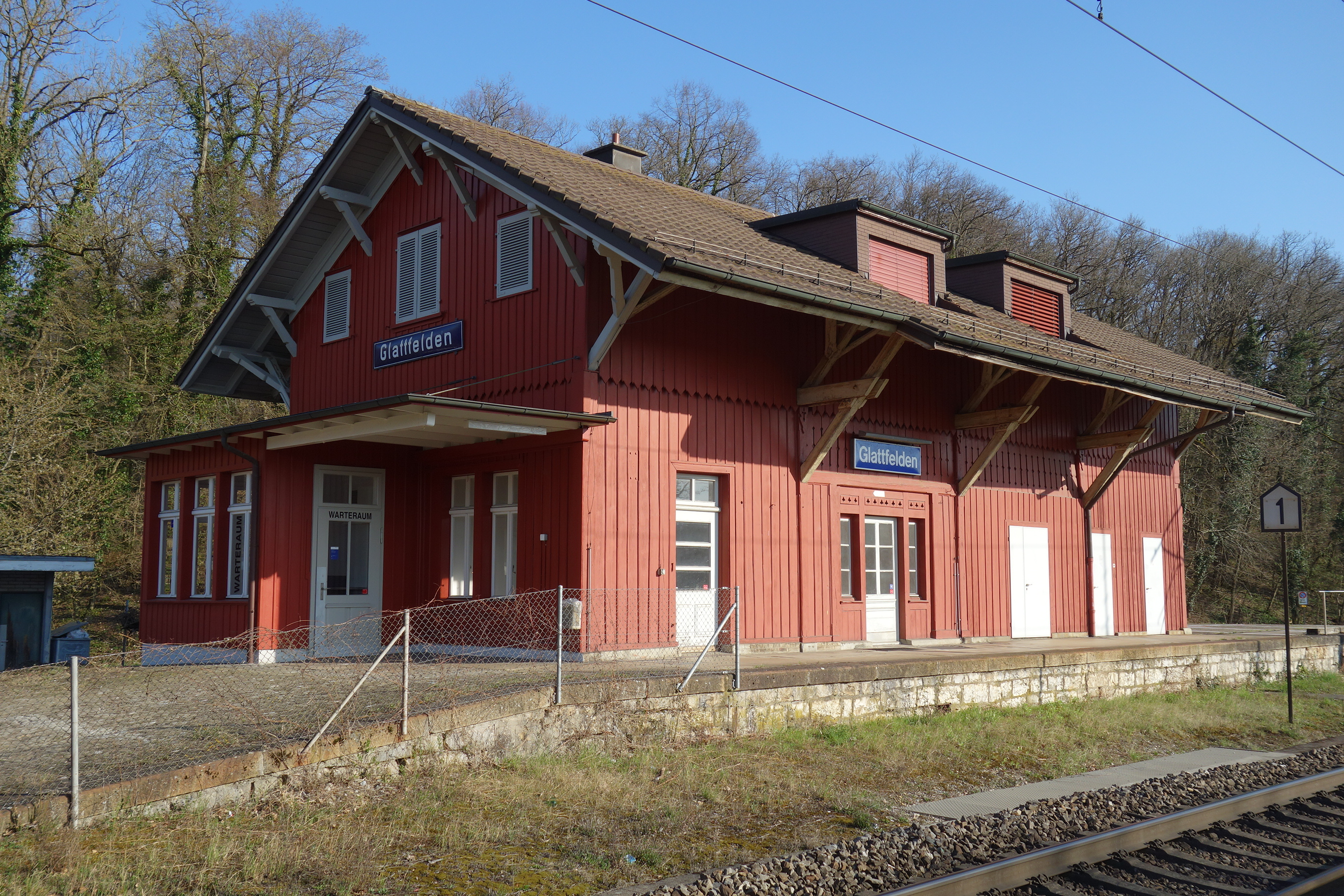
- The station building in 2019

General information
- Location: Stationstrasse; Bülach, Zürich; Switzerland
- Coordinates: 47°32′55″N 8°31′27″E
- Elevation: 410 m (1,350 ft)
- Owner: Swiss Federal Railways
- Line: Winterthur–Bülach–Koblenz line
- Distance: 19.4 km (12.1 mi) from Winterthur
- Platforms: 1 island platform
- Tracks: 2
- Train operators: Swiss Federal Railways
- Connections: PostAuto Schweiz line 540

Construction
- Parking: yes

Other information
- Fare zone: 113 (ZVV)

Passengers
- 2018: 1,200 per working day

Services
Preceding station	Zurich S-Bahn	Following station
Eglisau towards Schaffhausen	S9	Bülach towards Uster
Eglisau towards Schaffhausen	SN65 Limited service	Bülach Terminus
Location
- Location within Switzerland Location within Canton of Zurich

Glattfelden railway station (German: Bahnhof Glattfelden) is a railway station in the Swiss canton of Zurich. The station takes its name from the nearby municipality of Glattfelden, although it is actually situated in the municipality of Bülach. It is located on the Winterthur to Koblenz line of Swiss Federal Railways, within fare zone 113 of the Zürcher Verkehrsverbund (ZVV).

== Services ==
As of the December 2020 timetable change, Glattfelden railway station is served by Zurich S-Bahn line S9, operating between Uster and Rafz/Schaffhausen, via Zurich. The S36 service does not call at the station.

- Zurich S-Bahn S9: half-hourly service between Uster and Rafz (via Zürich HB); every other train continues from Rafz to Schaffhausen.

During weekends, there is also a Nighttime S-Bahn service (SN65) offered by ZVV.

- SN65: hourly service to Bülach and Schaffhausen.

A PostBus service connects the station with Glattfelden village and Zweidlen station.

== See also ==
- Rail transport in Switzerland
