= Eglisau =

- Municipality
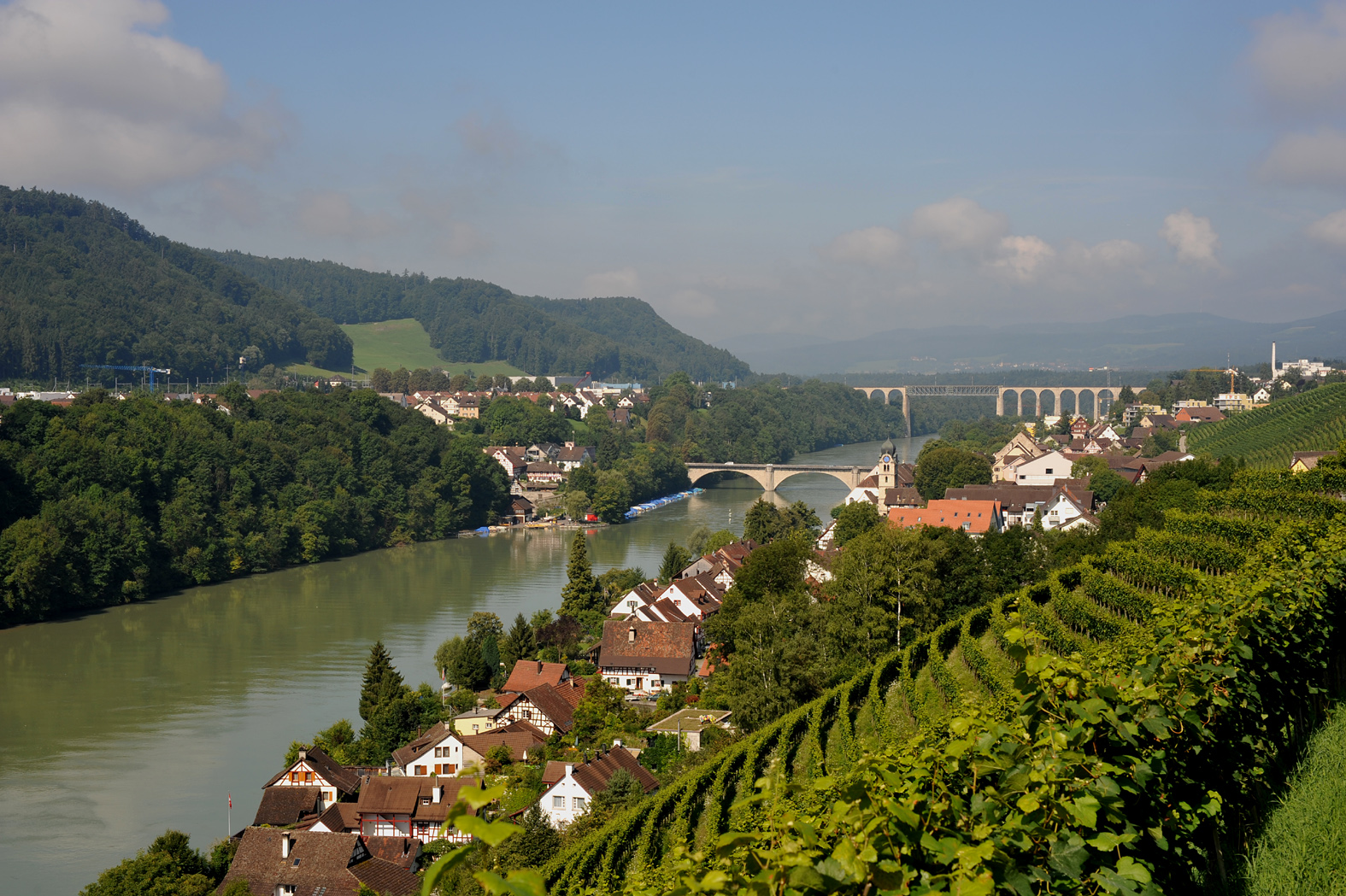

- Flag Coat of arms
- Location of Eglisau
- Location within Switzerland Location within Canton of Zürich
- Coordinates: 47°35′N 8°31′E
- Country: Switzerland
- Canton: Zürich
- District: Bülach

Government
  - Mayor: Ursula Fehr SVP/UDC (as of 2015)

Area
  - Total: 9.07 km^{2} (3.50 sq mi)
- Elevation: 355 m (1,165 ft)

Population (December 2020)
  - Total: 5,491
  - Density: 605/km^{2} (1,570/sq mi)
- Demonym: Eglisauer
- Time zone: UTC+01:00 (CET)
  - Summer (DST): UTC+02:00 (CEST)
- Postal code: 8193
- SFOS number: 55
- ISO 3166 code: CH-ZH
- Localities: Burg, Kaiserhof, Seglingen, Tössriedern, Wiler, Sampfi
- Surrounded by: Buchberg (SH), Bülach, Freienstein-Teufen, Glattfelden, Hohentengen am Hochrhein (DE-BW), Hüntwangen, Rafz, Rorbas, Rüdlingen (SH), Wil
- Website: www.eglisau.ch

Eglisau is a municipality in the district of Bülach in the canton of Zürich in Switzerland.

== History ==
Aerial view from 50 m by Walter Mittelholzer (1929)

Eglisau is first mentioned in 892 as several independent farm houses known as Ouwa. In 1238 it was mentioned as Owe, in 1304 as ze Seglinger Owe, in 1332 as ze Eglins Owe and in 1352 as ze Eglisowe.

It is located at the crossing of two major transport routes. The location along both sides of the Rhine river allowed it to dominate locate ship traffic. It was also the site of a bridge which made the north–south road between the Klettgau and the Zürichgau. This important location made it the home of the Zürich appointed Landvogt and led to it becoming a market town.

== Geography ==
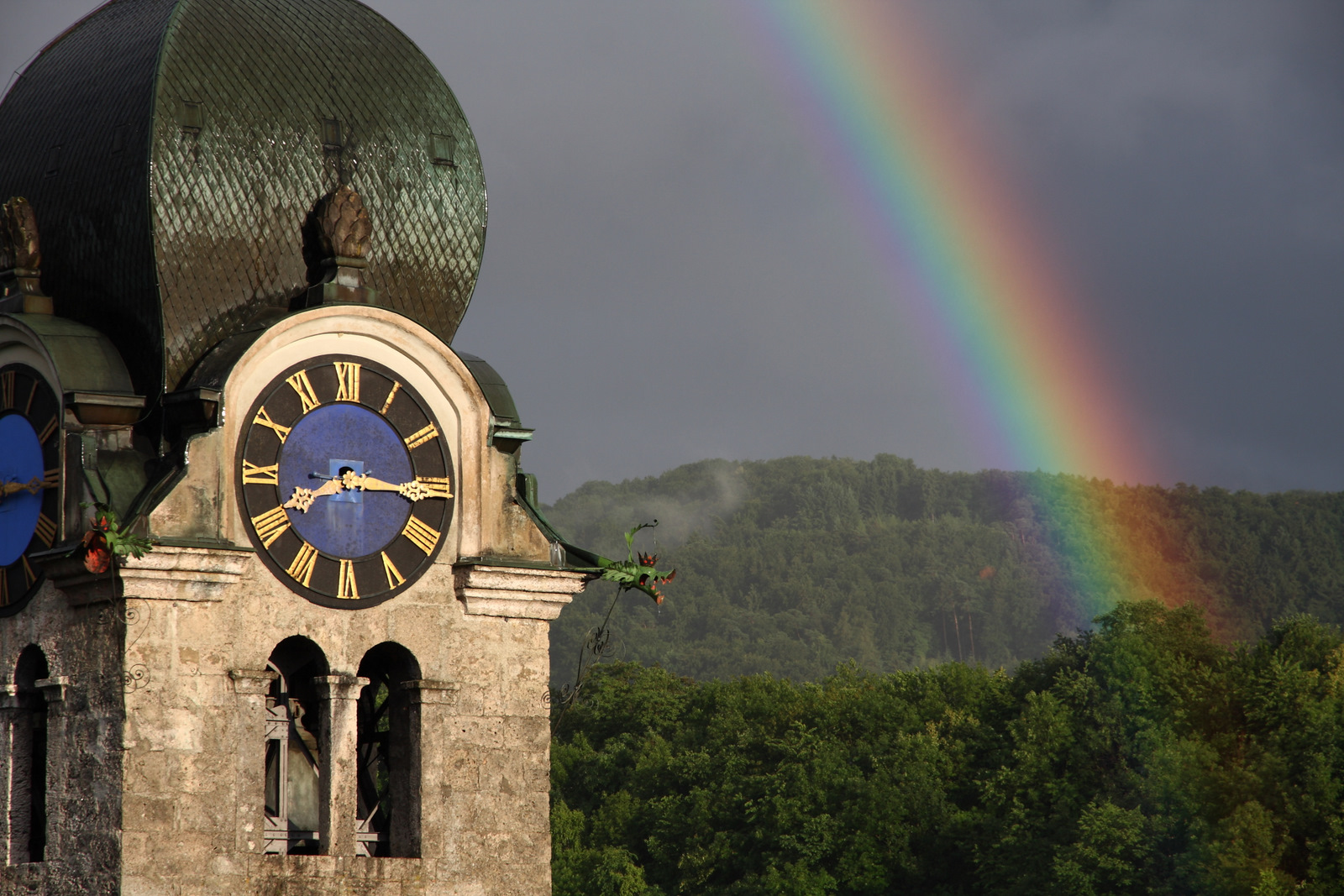
A rainbow around the church

Eglisau has an area of 9.1 km^{2} (3.5 sq mi). Of this area, 35.5% is used for agricultural purposes, while 41.3% is forested. Of the rest of the land, 15.9% is settled (buildings or roads) and the remainder (7.4%) is non-productive (rivers, etc.).

The municipality sits on the banks of the Rhine and has historically been an important bridge over the river. It is made up of the sections of Städtli, Burg, Steig and Wiler on the right bank and the section of Seglingen with the hamlet of Tössriedern on the left bank.

== Demographics ==
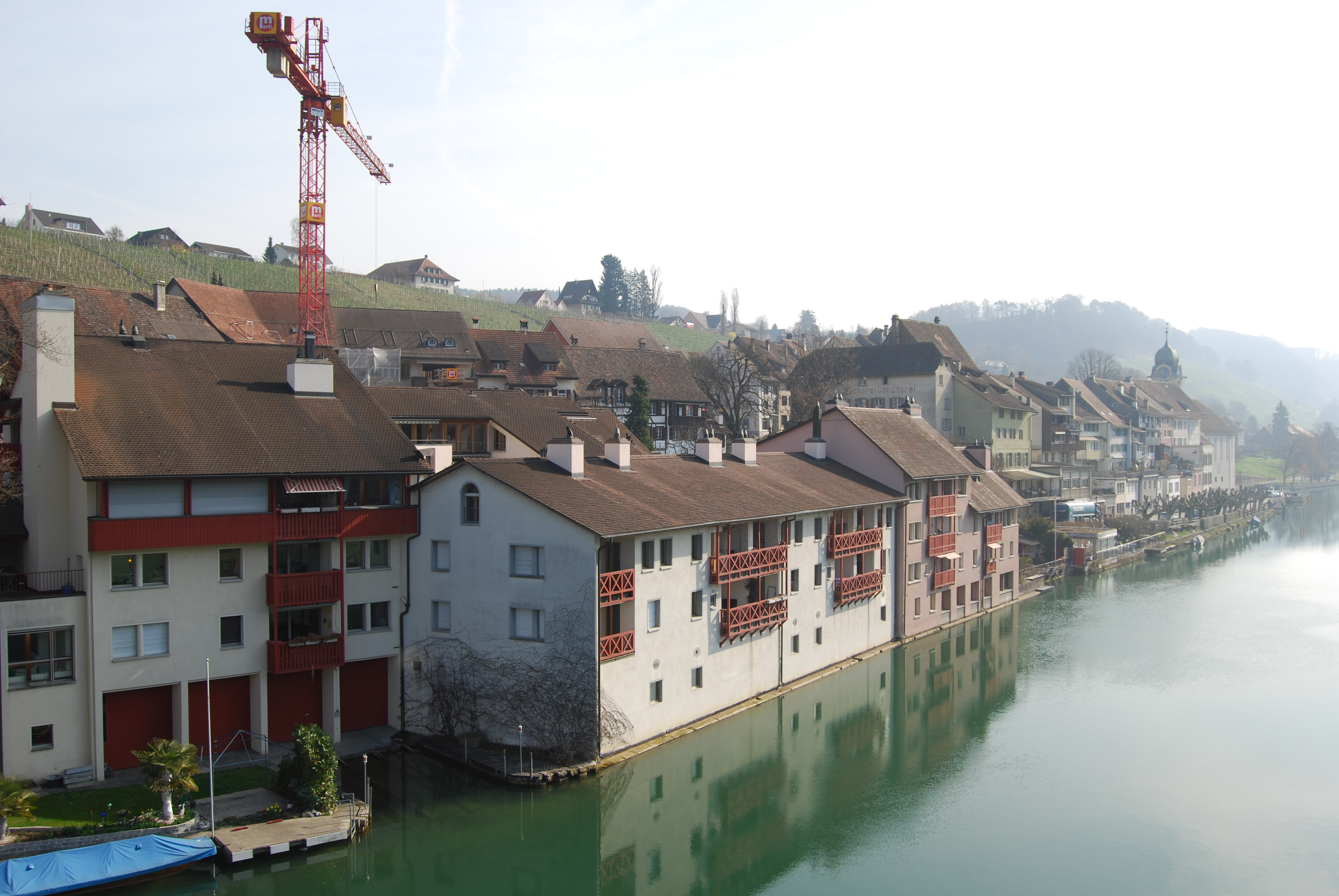
Eglisau on the Rhine river

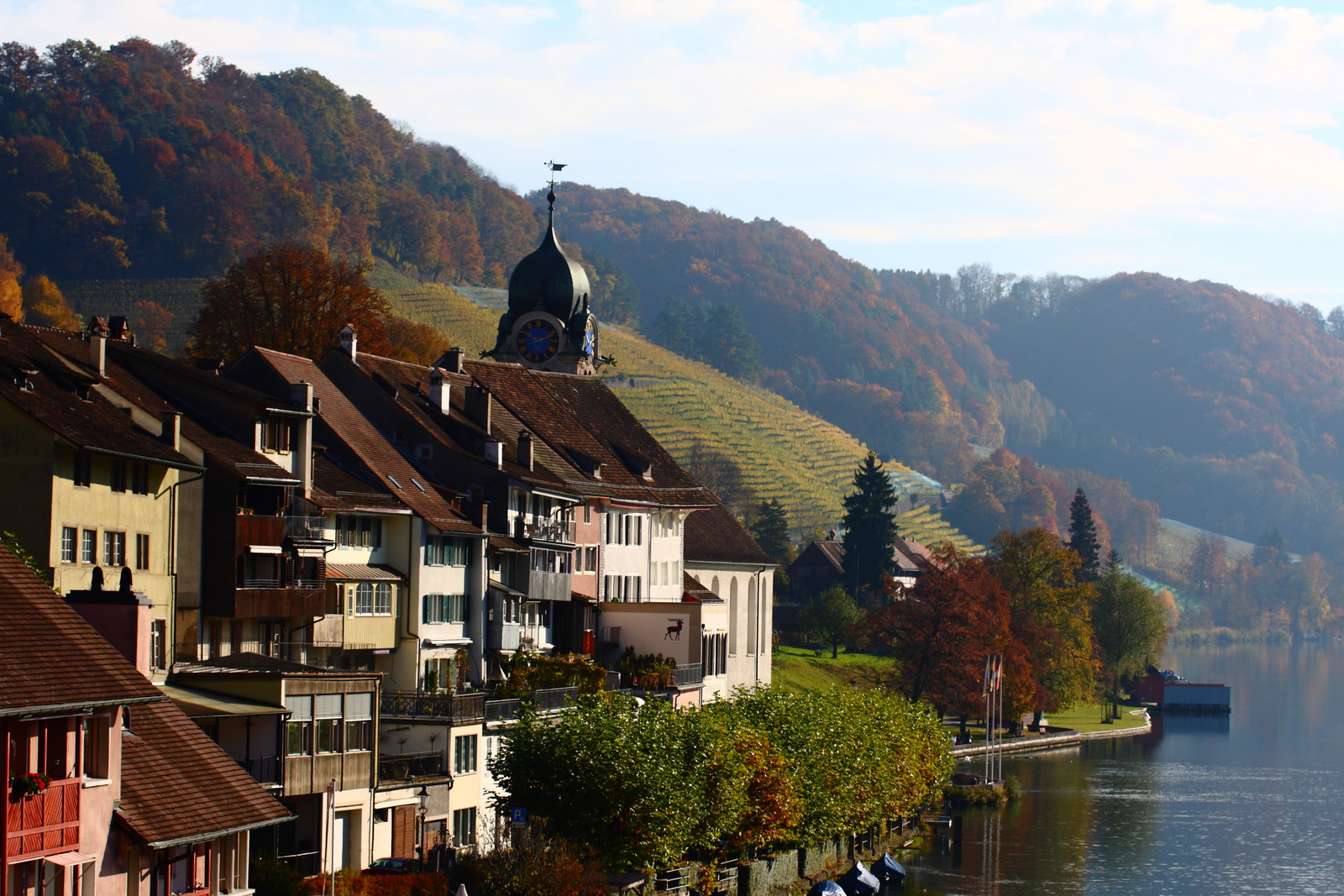
Autumn's Colors

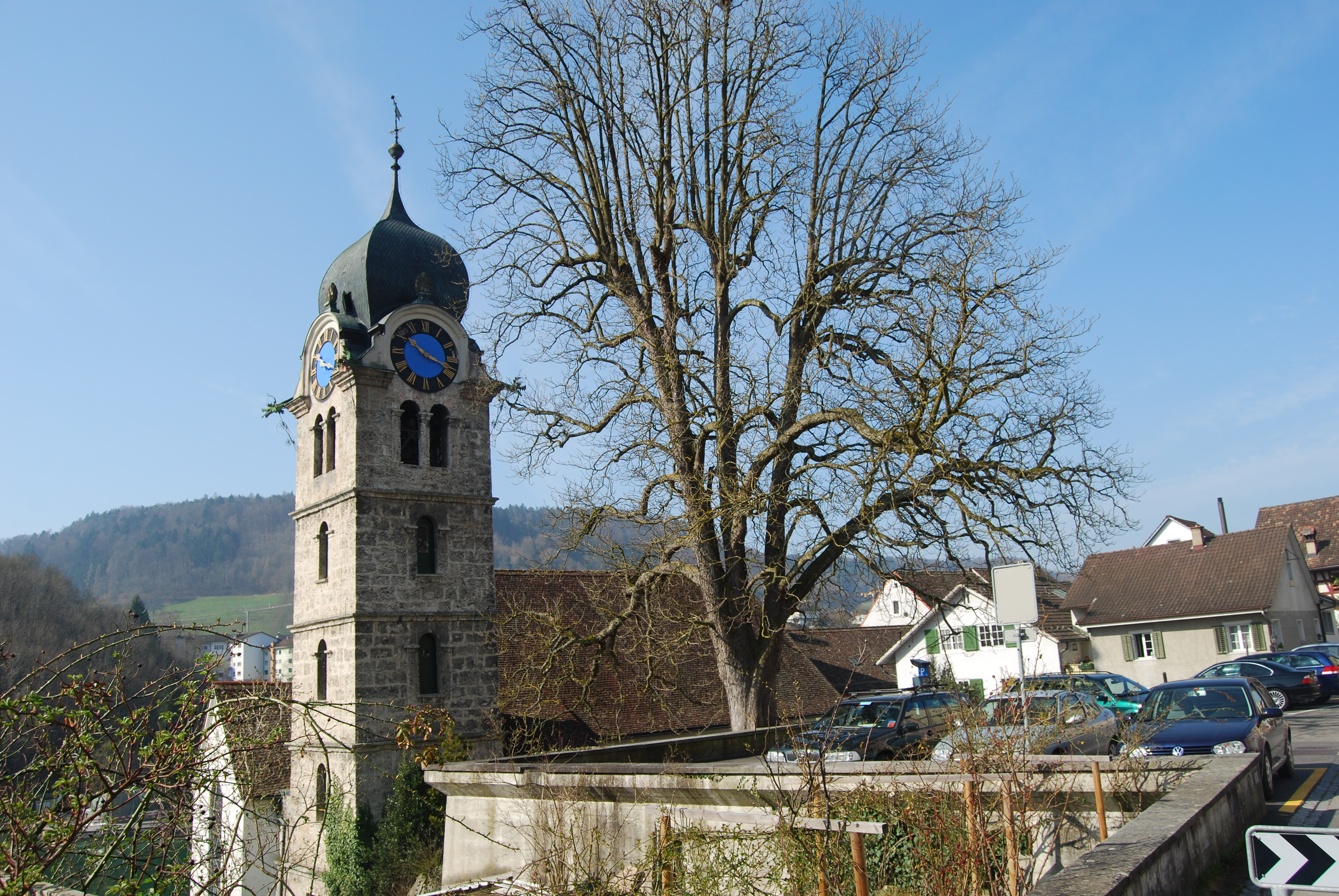
Reformed church

Eglisau has a population (as of 31 December 2020) of 5,491. As of 2007, 16.6% of the population was made up of foreign nationals. Over the last 10 years the population has grown at a rate of 33.1%. Most of the population (as of 2000) speaks German (90.3%), with Italian being second most common ( 3.0%) and Albanian being third ( 1.8%).

In the 2007 election the most popular party was the SVP which received 38.5% of the vote. The next three most popular parties were the SPS (17.7%), the CSP (11.8%) and the Green Party (11%).

The age distribution of the population (as of 2000) is children and teenagers (0–19 years old) make up 23.6% of the population, while adults (20–64 years old) make up 61.9% and seniors (over 64 years old) make up 14.5%. In Eglisau about 79.8% of the population (between age 25-64) have completed either non-mandatory upper secondary education or additional higher education (either university or a Fachhochschule).

Eglisau has an unemployment rate of 2.55%. As of 2005, there were 97 people employed in the primary economic sector and about 30 businesses involved in this sector. 473 people are employed in the secondary sector and there are 33 businesses in this sector. 703 people are employed in the tertiary sector, with 108 businesses in this sector. The historical population is given in the following table:

year	population
13th Century	c. 150
14th Century	350
1488	650
1588	860
1634	998
1689	1,494
1796	1,578
1850	1,612
1880	1,449
1900	1,175
1950	1,603
2000	2,893

== Transport ==
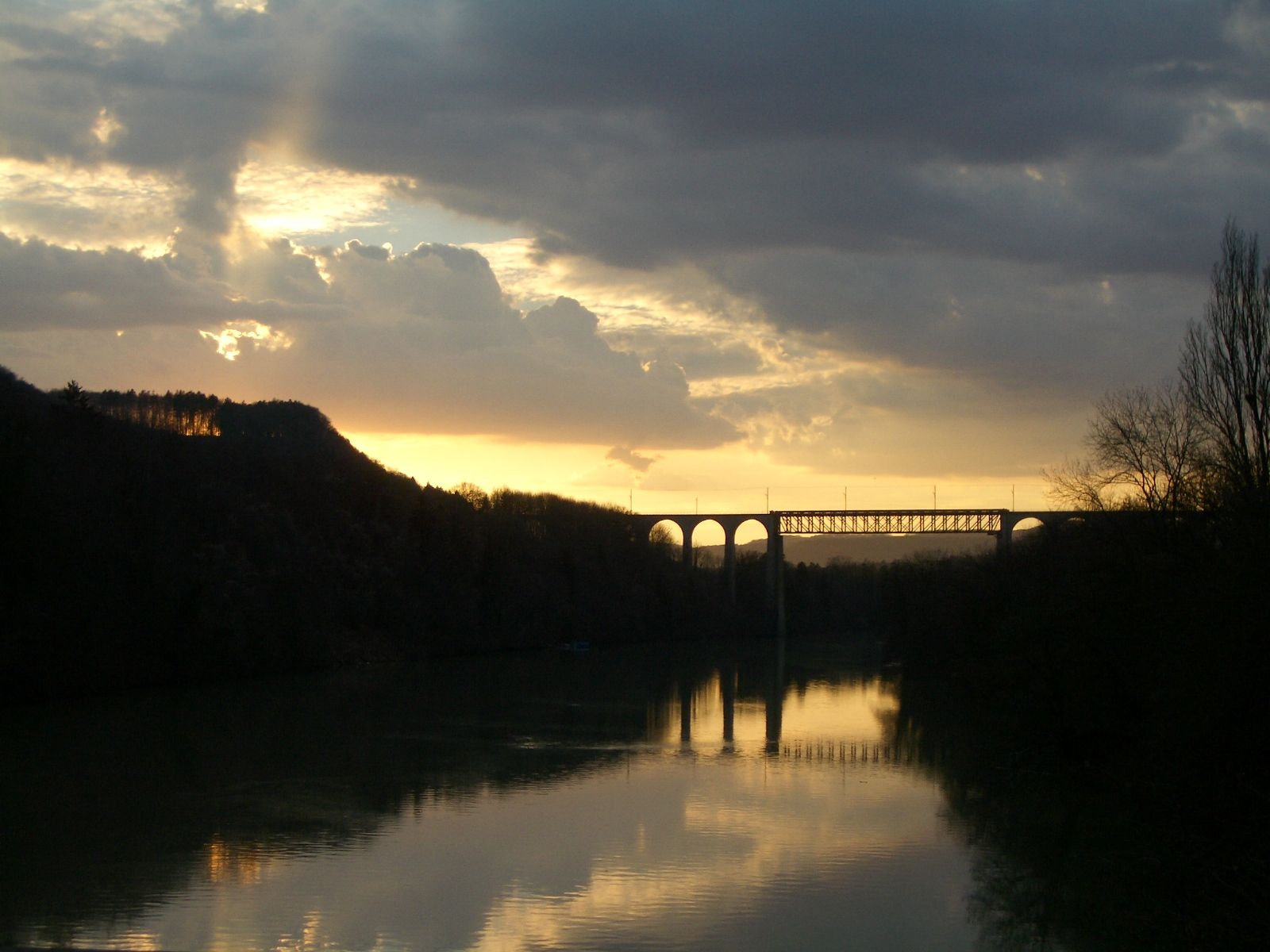
Eglisau railway bridge over the Rhine

As well as good rail links to Schaffhausen and Zürich, it has a regular river boat service to nearby villages along the river.

Eglisau railway station is a stop of the Zürich S-Bahn on the lines S9 and S36, and is a 31-minute ride from Zürich Hauptbahnhof. Hüntwangen-Wil railway station also lies partly within the municipality, and is served by the S9. Until 2015, the S22 served both railway stations. Between the two stations, the line crosses the Eglisau railway bridge over the Rhine.
