= Hüntwangen =

- Municipality
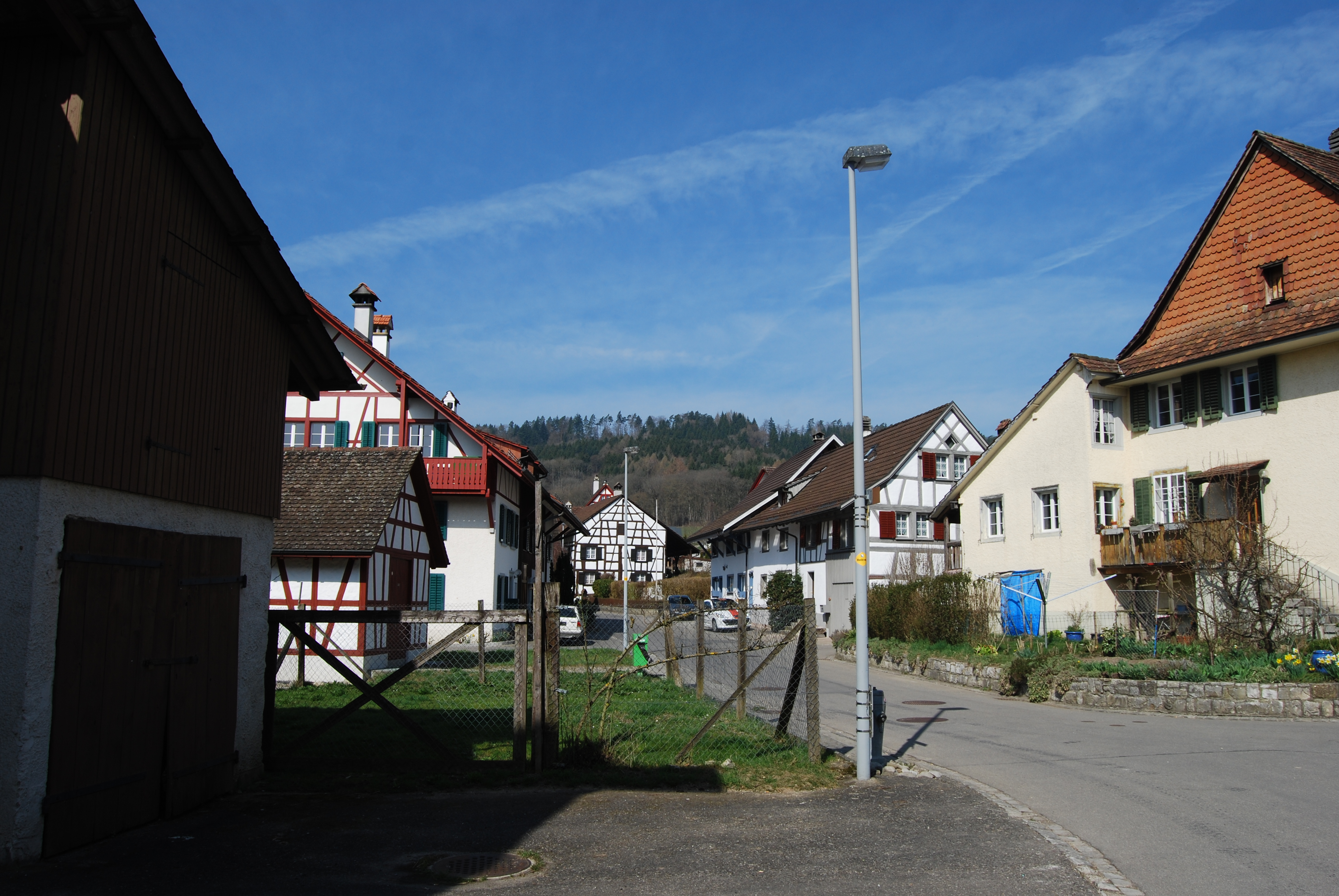

- Flag Coat of arms
- Location of Hüntwangen
- Location within Switzerland Location within Canton of Zurich
- Coordinates: 47°36′N 8°30′E
- Country: Switzerland
- Canton: Zurich
- District: Bülach

Area
  - Total: 4.97 km^{2} (1.92 sq mi)
- Elevation: 390 m (1,280 ft)

Population (December 2020)
  - Total: 1,067
  - Density: 215/km^{2} (556/sq mi)
- Time zone: UTC+01:00 (CET)
  - Summer (DST): UTC+02:00 (CEST)
- Postal code: 8194
- SFOS number: 61
- ISO 3166 code: CH-ZH
- Surrounded by: Eglisau, Glattfelden, Hohentengen am Hochrhein (DE-BW), Wasterkingen, Wil
- Website: www.huentwangen.ch

Hüntwangen is a municipality in the district of Bülach in the canton of Zürich in Switzerland.

== History ==
Hüntwangen is first mentioned in 1254 as Hiuntwangin.

Aerial view (1968)

== Geography ==
Hüntwangen has an area of 4.9 km^{2} (1.9 sq mi). Of this area, 50.9% is used for agricultural purposes, while 32.9% is forested. Of the rest of the land, 13.6% is settled (buildings or roads) and the remainder (2.6%) is non-productive (rivers, glaciers or mountains).

The municipality is located on the western edge of the Rafzerfeld, the region in the district which is north of the Rhine.

== Demographics ==
Hüntwangen has a population (as of 31 December 2020) of 1,067. As of 2007, 7.4% of the population was made up of foreign nationals. Over the last 10 years the population has grown at a rate of 22.9%. Most of the population (as of 2000) speaks German (96.8%), with Italian being second most common ( 0.8%) and French being third ( 0.5%).

In the 2007 election the most popular party was the SVP which received 42.8% of the vote. The next three most popular parties were the SPS (17%), the FDP (11.2%) and the Green Party (8.9%).

The age distribution of the population (as of 2000) is children and teenagers (0–19 years old) make up 24.3% of the population, while adults (20–64 years old) make up 63.2% and seniors (over 64 years old) make up 12.5%. In Hüntwangen about 85.5% of the population (between age 25–64) have completed either non-mandatory upper secondary education or additional higher education (either university or a Fachhochschule).

Hüntwangen has an unemployment rate of 1.61%. As of 2005, there were 34 people employed in the primary economic sector and about 13 businesses involved in this sector. 65 people are employed in the secondary sector and there are 8 businesses in this sector. 92 people are employed in the tertiary sector, with 26 businesses in this sector.

The historical population is given in the following table:

year	population
1640	175
1722	456
1836	588
1850	639
1900	538
1920	516
1950	523
2000	782

== Transport ==
Hüntwangen-Wil railway station is a stop of the Zürich S-Bahn on the line S9. It is a 35-minute ride from Zürich Hauptbahnhof.
