= Rafz train crash =

2015 rail transport accident in Rafz, Switzerland

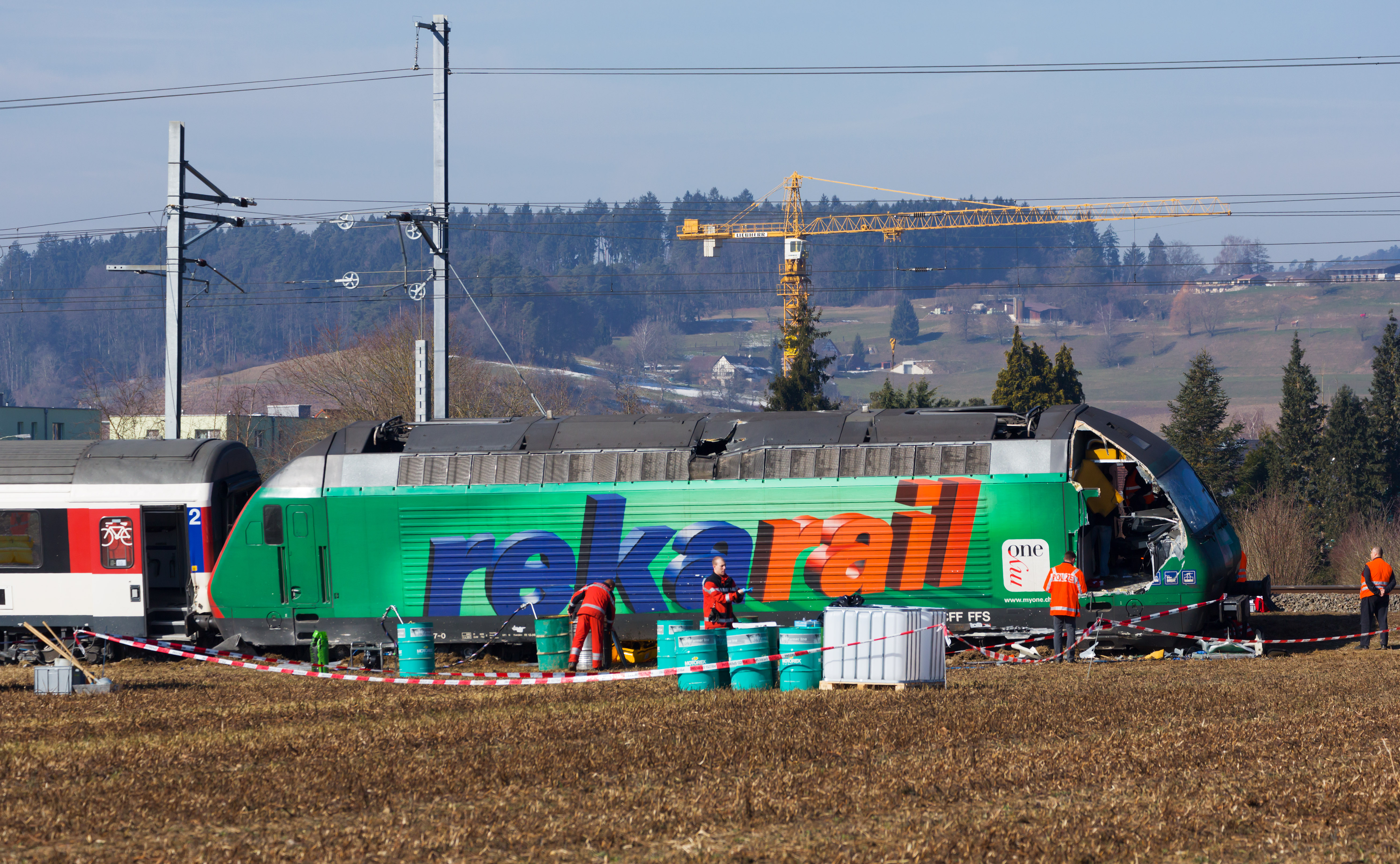
- Locomotive 460 087-0 was hauling the Interregio train.

Details
- Date: 20 February 2015; 06:43 CET (UTC+01:00)
- Location: Rafz
- Coordinates: 47°36′12″N 8°32′36″E
- Country: Switzerland
- Line: Eglisau–Neuhausen railway line
- Operator: Interregio and S-Bahn
- Incident type: Side collision
- Cause: Signal passed at danger

Statistics
- Trains: Two
- Injured: 6

The Rafz train crash occurred at approximately 6.43 am on 20 February 2015. An S-Bahn and an Interregio express train collided at Rafz railway station in Rafz, Canton of Zürich, Switzerland.

== Accident ==
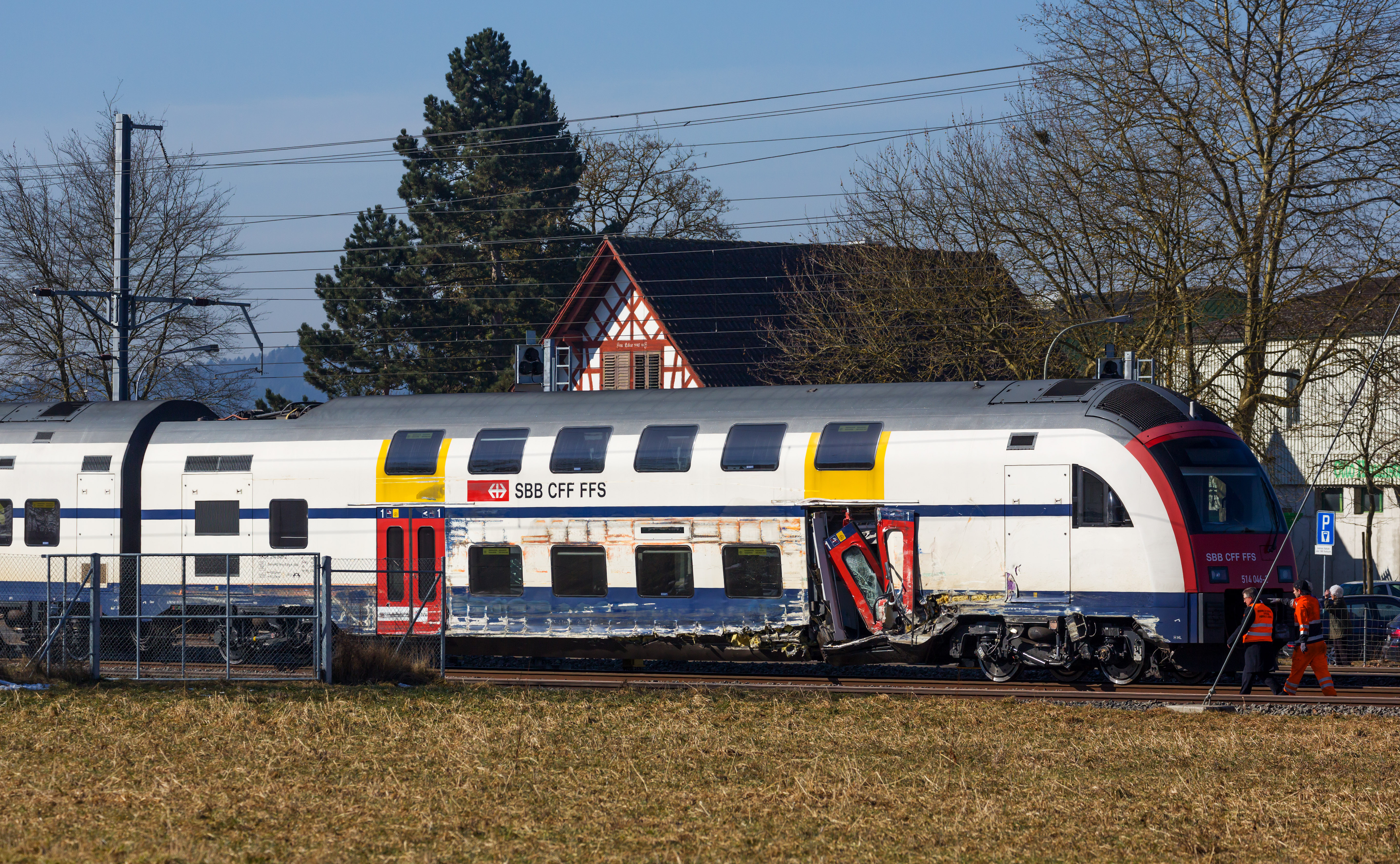
The S-Bahn train was formed by a Class 514 electric multiple unit 514 046-2.

The collision occurred as the Interregio train, which was running late, was passing through Ratz without stopping. The S-Bahn train was departing for Jestetten and was involved in a side-long collision, with the Interregio train coming from behind the S-Bahn train. The express was partially derailed, but the couplings held and no carriages overturned. The S-Bahn train was operated by Class 514 electric multiple unit 514 046-2. The InterRegio train was hauled by Class 460 electric locomotive No. 460 087-0. The 49-year-old driver of the express was seriously injured. He was airlifted to hospital by helicopter. There were five other injuries requiring hospital treatment.

Both drivers were in training and accompanied by instructors. A passenger on the S-bahn train said he believed that his train had departed against a red signal. A bridge over a road was damaged and left in danger of collapse. A crane was brought in to recover the derailed carriages, which were then removed by road. About 60 metres (66 yd) of track was damaged, along with a number of supports for the catenary.

== Investigation ==
Shortly after the accident occurred, the Swiss Transportation Safety Investigation Board (STSB) opened an investigation.

A similar accident in January 2013 at Neuhausen, on the same line, was caused by outmoded safety equipment that allowed a train to leave the station against a signal. The equipment at Rafz should in theory have prevented the 2015 crash; authorities investigated why it did not, and whether there are any similarities between the two accidents. The automatic braking equipment is not activated at the first signal after a train has been turned. The head of the train drivers' union (Verband Schweizer Lokführer und Anwärter VSLF) suggested as a possible cause operator confusion because when Rafz station was renovated in 2011, the applicable signal was installed on the right rather than the left, where such signals are usually positioned. He proposed a rule that trains departing after a change of direction limit their initial speed to 40 kilometres per hour (25 mph).

In September 2016, the STSB published final report regarding the accident. There, it was concluded that the accident occurred because both drivers of the S-Bahn train had passed a signal at danger. Although an automatic system would later decelerate the train to a standstill, the system could not do so in time, resulting in the train partially protruding onto the tracks of the incoming InterRegio train, resulting in the collision. Among other factors, the STSB identified safety deficits related to the placement of the signals, the communication in the driver's cabin and the training of staff, as well as the target time for the reversal of trains.

Although human error was identified as a main factor of the accident, the SBB determined that none of the drivers were to face any measures of labour law, and both the trainees involved were able to finish their training.

== Legacy ==
Following the recommendations of the VSLF and the STSB, the SBB implemented new rules for reversing trains, imposing the proposed 40 km/h (25 mph) limit until the first signal to ensure that an automatic braking system could slow down the train before it crosses into a hazardous zone. In a press release, SBB indicated that they would investigate whether they could speed up the nationwide implementation of the European Train Control System Level 2, which would prevent situations of this kind, and which was set to be rolled out from 2025 onwards. Additionally, an app, the development of which had been started as a result of the Granges-près-Marnand train crash, was rolled out in August after the accident in Rafz, which warns drivers before they pass signals at danger.

The SBB also made changes to the systems around Rafz railway station, including velocity control systems and improvement of the signalling lights.
