= Wil, Zürich =

Wil
- Municipality
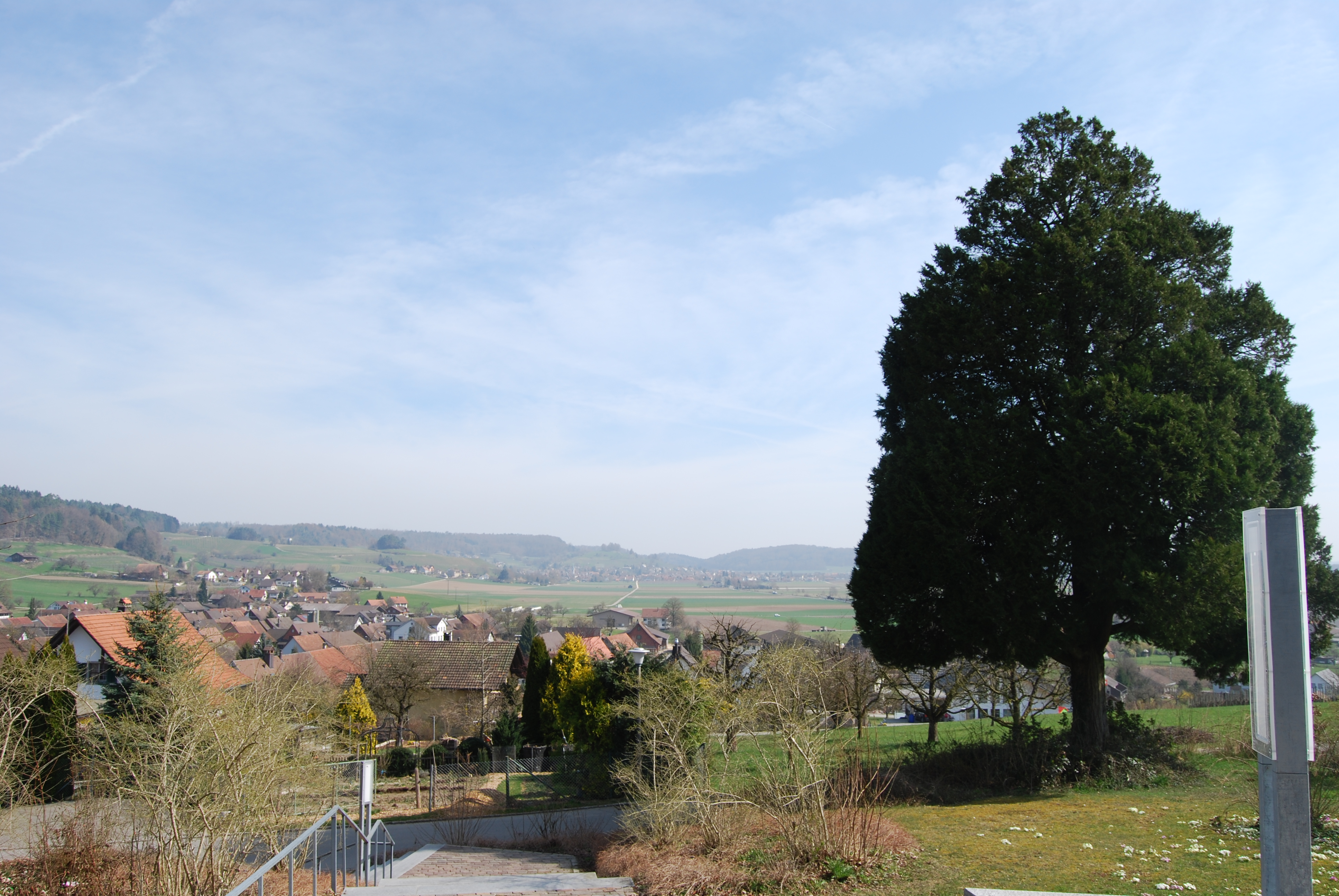

- Flag Coat of arms
- Location of Wil
- Location within Switzerland Location within Canton of Zurich
- Coordinates: 47°36′N 8°30′E
- Country: Switzerland
- Canton: Zurich
- District: Bülach

Area
  - Total: 8.94 km^{2} (3.45 sq mi)
- Elevation: 406 m (1,332 ft)

Population (December 2020)
  - Total: 1,488
  - Density: 166/km^{2} (431/sq mi)
- Time zone: UTC+01:00 (CET)
  - Summer (DST): UTC+02:00 (CEST)
- Postal code: 8196
- SFOS number: 71
- ISO 3166 code: CH-ZH
- Surrounded by: Dettighofen (DE-BW), Eglisau, Hüntwangen, Klettgau (DE-BW), Rafz, Wasterkingen
- Website: www.wil-zh.ch

Wil is a municipality in the district of Bülach in the canton of Zürich in Switzerland.

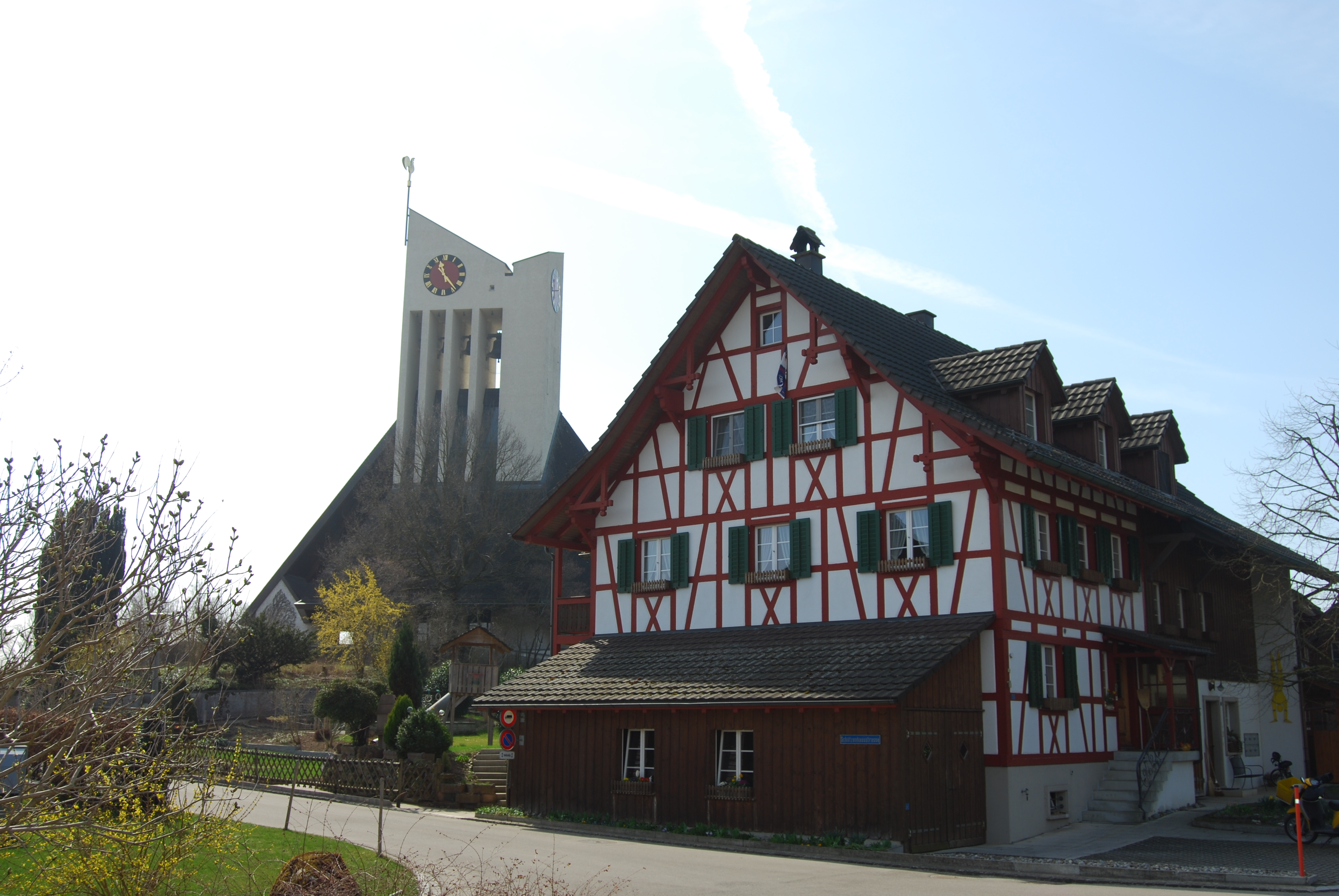
Wil

== Geography ==
Aerial view (1958)

Wil has an area of 9 km^{2} (3.5 sq mi). Of this area, 54.2% is used for agricultural purposes, while 30.4% is forested. Of the rest of the land, 14.5% is settled (buildings or roads) and the remainder (0.9%) is non-productive (rivers, glaciers or mountains).

There are border crossings into Germany at near Wil town (to Bühl in Baden-Wurttemberg) and Buchenloo (to Dettighofen in Baden-Wurttemberg).

== Demographics ==
Wil has a population (as of 31 December 2020) of 1,488. As of 2007, 7.3% of the population was made up of foreign nationals. Over the last 10 years the population has decreased at a rate of -1.6%. Most of the population (as of 2000) speaks German (95.5%), with Spanish being second most common ( 0.8%) and Italian being third ( 0.7%).

In the 2007 election the most popular party was the SVP which received 48.5% of the vote. The next three most popular parties were the CSP (12.2%), the SPS (11.5%) and the FDP (11.4%).

The age distribution of the population (as of 2000) is children and teenagers (0–19 years old) make up 28.1% of the population, while adults (20–64 years old) make up 60.2% and seniors (over 64 years old) make up 11.7%. In Wil about 82% of the population (between age 25–64) have completed either non-mandatory upper secondary education or additional higher education (either university or a Fachhochschule).

Wil has an unemployment rate of 1.57%. As of 2005, there were 76 people employed in the primary economic sector and about 26 businesses involved in this sector. 161 people are employed in the secondary sector and there are 21 businesses in this sector. 147 people are employed in the tertiary sector, with 39 businesses in this sector.

== Transport ==
Hüntwangen-Wil railway station is a stop of the Zürich S-Bahn on the line S9. It is a 35-minute ride from Zürich Hauptbahnhof.
