= Wasterkingen =

- Municipality
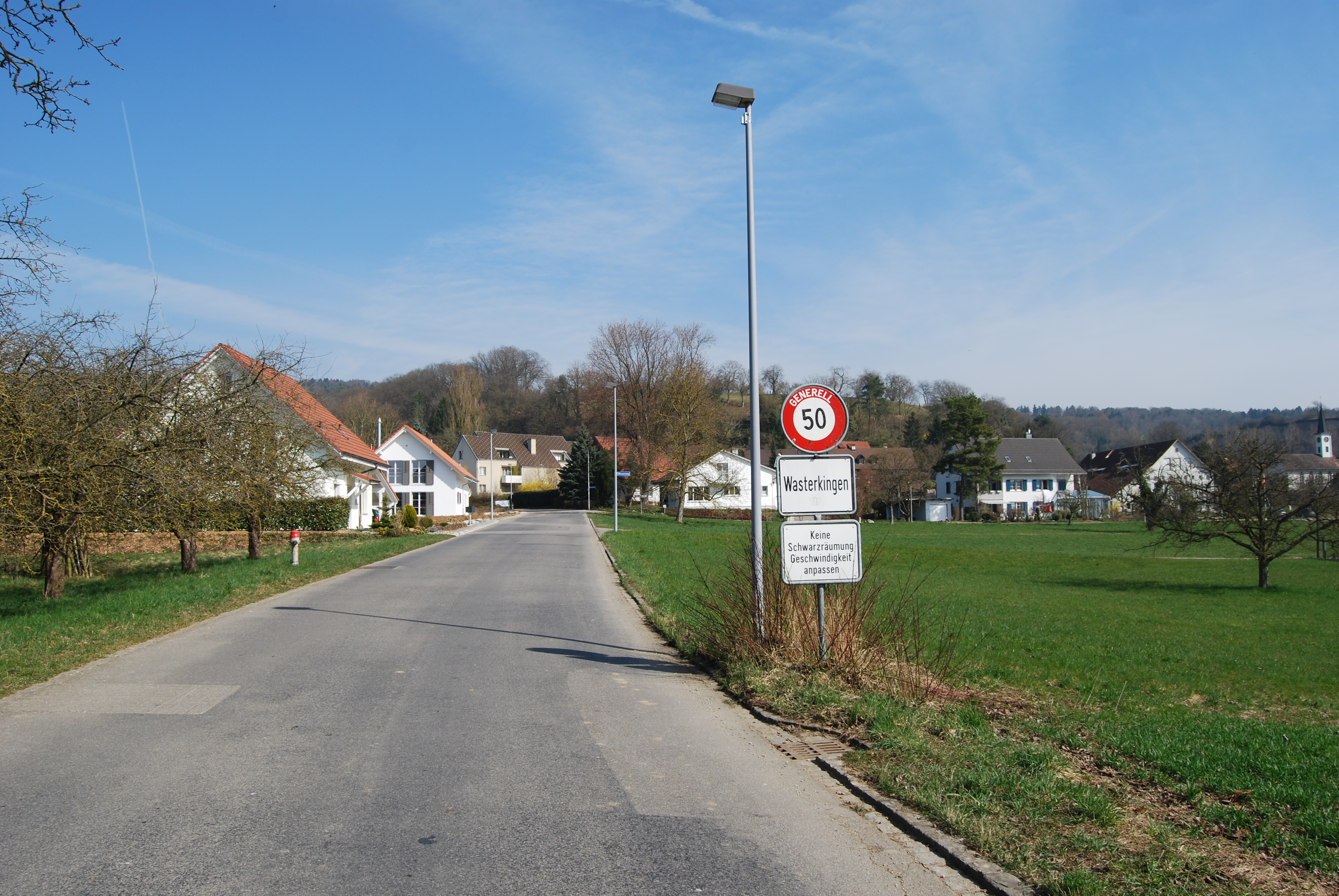

- Flag Coat of arms
- Location of Wasterkingen
- Location within Switzerland Location within Canton of Zurich
- Coordinates: 47°35′N 8°28′E
- Country: Switzerland
- Canton: Zurich
- District: Bülach

Area
  - Total: 3.95 km^{2} (1.53 sq mi)
- Elevation: 393 m (1,289 ft)

Population (December 2020)
  - Total: 568
  - Density: 144/km^{2} (372/sq mi)
- Time zone: UTC+01:00 (CET)
  - Summer (DST): UTC+02:00 (CEST)
- Postal code: 8195
- SFOS number: 70
- ISO 3166 code: CH-ZH
- Surrounded by: Hohentengen am Hochrhein (DE-BW), Hüntwangen, Klettgau (DE-BW), Wil
- Website: www.wasterkingen.ch

Wasterkingen is a municipality in the district of Bülach in the canton of Zürich in Switzerland.

== History ==
Aerial view (1964)

In 2002, Wasterkingen had his 900th birthday, the Wasterkingener celebrated with a party and there were a lot of attractions with the goal to teach the history of this village.

== Geography ==
Wasterkingen has an area of 3.9 km^{2} (1.5 sq mi). Of this area, 46.4% is used for agricultural purposes, while 43.4% is forested. The rest of the land, (10.2%) is settled.

Wasterkingen has a road border crossing into Germany. Günzgen in the state of Baden-Württemberg lies just across the border.

== Demographics ==
Wasterkingen has a population (as of 31 December 2020) of 568. As of 2007, 7.7% of the population was made up of foreign nationals. Over the last 10 years the population has grown at a rate of 3.7%. Most of the population (as of 2000) speaks German (98.0%), with French being second most common ( 0.7%) and English being third ( 0.5%).

In the 2007 election the most popular party was the SVP which received 53.8% of the vote. The next three most popular parties were the SPS (17.3%), the Green Party (10.3%) and the CSP (6.2%).

The age distribution of the population (as of 2000) is children and teenagers (0–19 years old) make up 28.6% of the population, while adults (20–64 years old) make up 60.4% and seniors (over 64 years old) make up 11.1%. In Wasterkingen about 91.8% of the population (between age 25–64) have completed either non-mandatory upper secondary education or additional higher education (either university or a Fachhochschule).

Wasterkingen has an unemployment rate of 1.25%. As of 2005, there were 31 people employed in the primary economic sector and about 11 businesses involved in this sector. 4 people are employed in the secondary sector and there are 3 businesses in this sector. 21 people are employed in the tertiary sector, with 7 businesses in this sector.
