= Dreiländereck (Basel) =

Monument marking the tripoint of France, Germany and Switzerland

Coordinates: 47.5885°N 7.5898°E

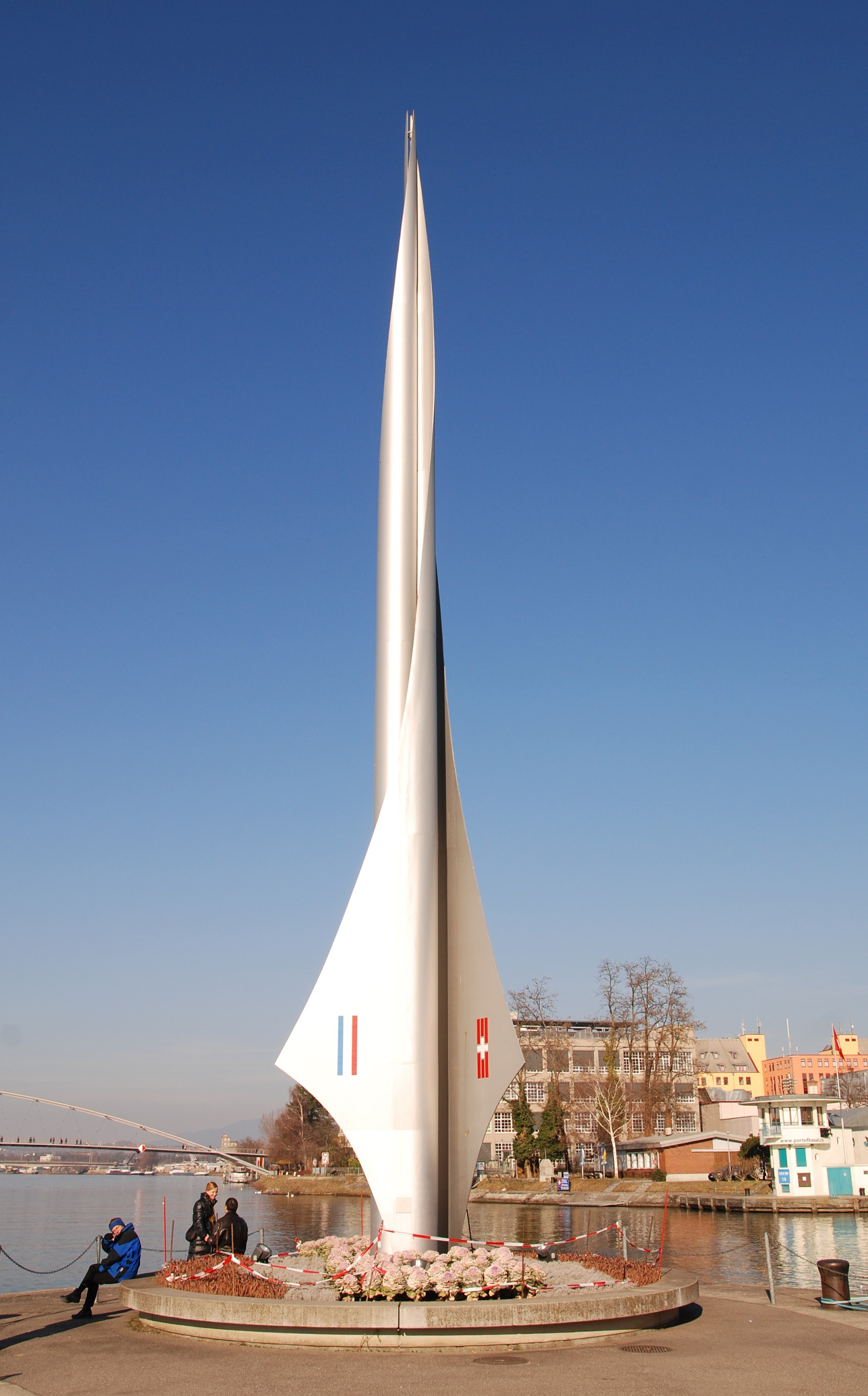
Dreiländereck

The Dreiländereck is a monument in Basel, Switzerland. It marks the tripoint where the borders of France, Germany and Switzerland meet. The France–Germany border, the Germany–Switzerland border and France–Switzerland border meet there.

== Location ==
The tripoint itself is located in the middle of the river Rhine. The monument dedicated to it is in Swiss territory, on a point of land approximately 150 metres (165 yards) to the south-east.
