= Bülach District =

Coordinates: 47°40′N 8°34′E

Bülach District Bezirk Bülach
- District
- Flag Coat of arms
- Country: Switzerland
- Canton: Zürich
- Capital: Bülach

Area
  - Total: 185.19 km^{2} (71.50 sq mi)

Population (31 December 2020)
  - Total: 156,900
  - Density: 847.2/km^{2} (2,194/sq mi)
- Time zone: UTC+1 (CET)
  - Summer (DST): UTC+2 (CEST)
- Municipalities: 22

Bülach District (Bezirk Bülach) is one of 12 districts of the Canton of Zürich in Switzerland, with some 117,000 inhabitants it is the third largest in the canton. Its administrative capital is Bülach, and the largest municipality in the district is Kloten, the location of Zurich Airport. It includes the Rafzerfeld north of the Rhine, with Rafz, Wil, Hüntwangen and Wasterkingen.

The territory of Bülach has been controlled by Zürich since 1409, the remaining parts followed in the later 15th century (Eglisau 1496), with the exception of the Rafzerfeld, which was acquired by Zürich in 1651.

== Municipalities ==
Municipality	Population (31 December 2020)	Area, km^{2}
Bachenbülach	3,743	4.25
Bassersdorf	11,924	9.02
Bülach	21,998	16.09
Dietlikon	7,875	4.26
Eglisau	5,491	9.07
Embrach	9,610	12.72
Freienstein-Teufen	2,397	8.32
Glattfelden	5,266	12.35
Hochfelden	2,020	6.16
Höri	2,951	4.85
Hüntwangen	1,067	4.97
Kloten	20,429	19.28
Lufingen	2,562	5.22
Nürensdorf	5,628	10.09
Oberembrach	1,105	10.20
Opfikon	20,954	5.61
Rafz	4,628	10.74
Rorbas	2,885	4.44
Wallisellen	17,218	6.50
Wasterkingen	568	3.95
Wil	1,488	8.94
Winkel	4,648	8.16
Total	156,900	185.19

== See also ==
- Municipalities of the canton of Zürich
