= Rafz =

- Municipality
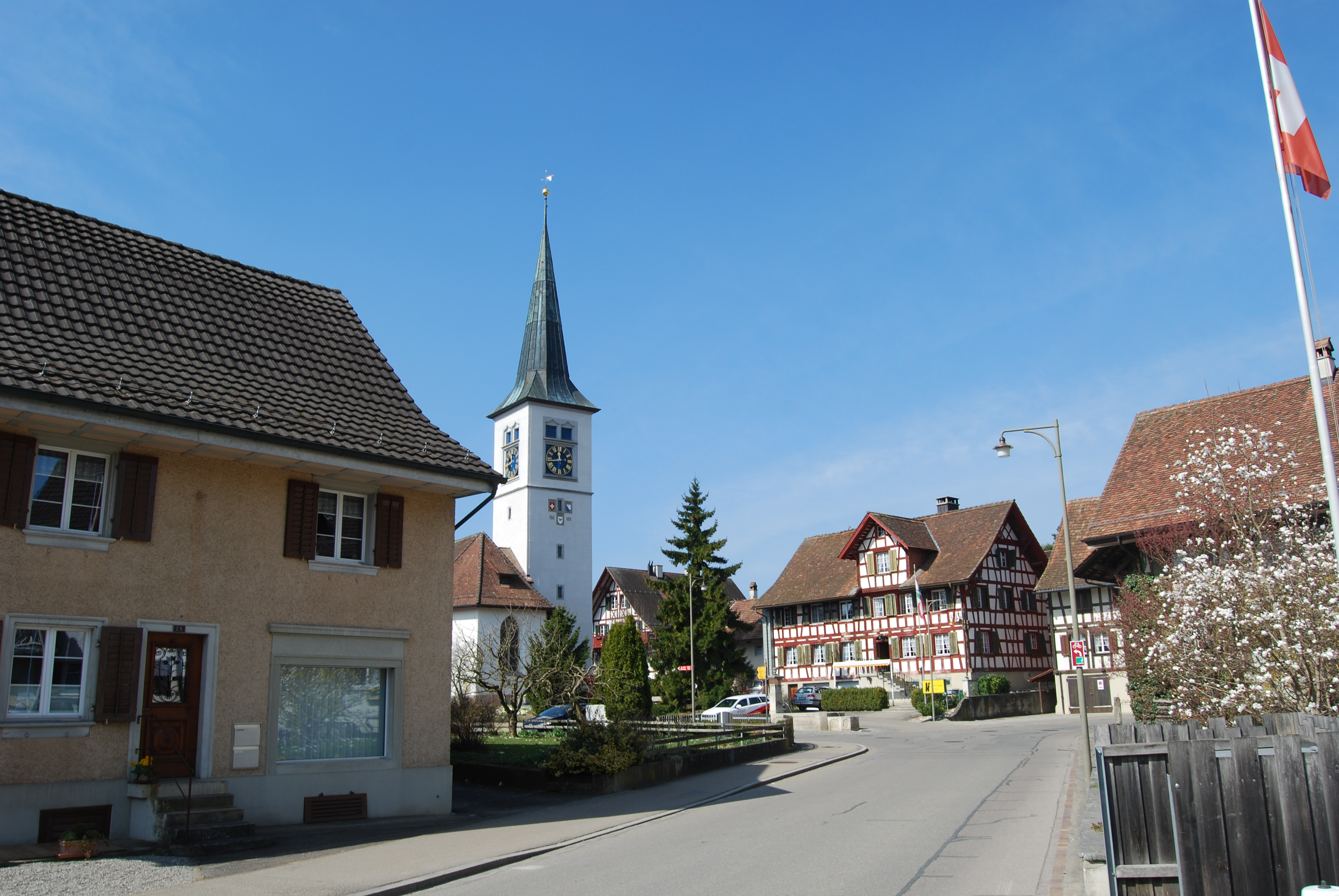

- Flag Coat of arms
- Location of Rafz
- Location within Switzerland Location within Canton of Zürich
- Coordinates: 47°37′N 8°32′E
- Country: Switzerland
- Canton: Zürich
- District: Bülach

Government
  - Mayor: Jürg Sigrist

Area
  - Total: 10.74 km^{2} (4.15 sq mi)
- Elevation: 419 m (1,375 ft)

Population (December 2020)
  - Total: 4,628
  - Density: 430.9/km^{2} (1,116/sq mi)
- Time zone: UTC+01:00 (CET)
  - Summer (DST): UTC+02:00 (CEST)
- Postal code: 8197
- SFOS number: 67
- ISO 3166 code: CH-ZH
- Surrounded by: Buchberg (SH), Dettighofen (DE-BW), Eglisau, Jestetten (DE-BW), Lottstetten (DE-BW), Rüdlingen (SH), Wil
- Twin towns: Hetvehely (Hungary)
- Website: www.rafz.ch

Rafz is a municipality in the district of Bülach in the northwest of the canton of Zürich in Switzerland.

Rafz was first mentioned in 1413 as Rafsa.

== Geography ==
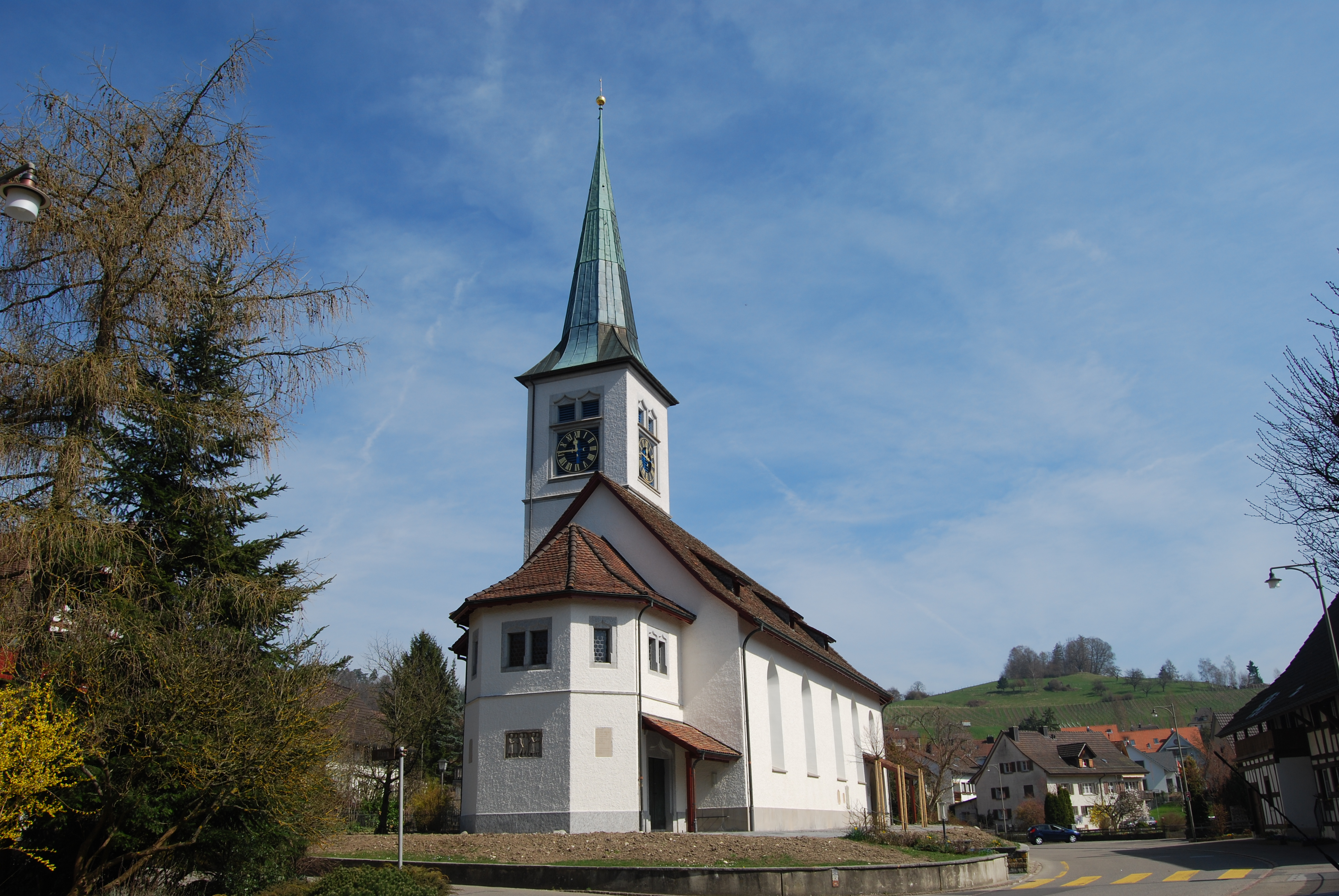
Church of Rafz

Aerial view from 300 m by Walter Mittelholzer (1923)

Rafz has an area of 10.7 km^{2} (4.1 sq mi). Of this area, 52% is used for agricultural purposes, while 33.1% is forested. The rest of the land (14.9%) is settled.

Rafz has border crossings into Germany at Schluchenberg with Baltersweil in Baden-Württemberg, Germany to the north of town; Rafz town with Lottstetten town also in Baden-Württemberg, and at Solgen with Lottstetten.

== Demographics ==
Rafz has a population (as of 31 December 2020) of 4,628. As of 2007, 14.7% of the population was made up of foreign nationals. Over the last 10 years the population has grown at a rate of 18.3%. Most of the population (as of 2000) speaks German (91.1%), with Italian being second most common (2.5%) and Albanian being third (2.5%).

In the 2007 election the most popular party was the SVP which received 44% of the vote. The next three most popular parties were the SPS (18.3%), the CSP (10.2%) and the Green Party (8.9%).

The age distribution of the population (as of 2000) is children and teenagers (0–19 years old) make up 28.5% of the population, while adults (20–64 years old) make up 59.9% and seniors (over 64 years old) make up 11.7%. In Rafz about 79.5% of the population (between age 25 and 64) have completed either non-mandatory upper secondary education or additional higher education (either university or a Fachhochschule).

Rafz has an unemployment rate of 1.95%. As of 2005, there were 150 people employed in the primary economic sector and about 38 businesses involved in this sector. The secondary sector employs 459 people and there are 40 businesses in this sector. The tertiary sector employs 536 people, with 91 businesses in this sector.

=== Historical population ===
The historical population is given in the following chart:

== Transport ==
Rafz railway station is the terminus of Zürich S-Bahn line S9 from Zürich, and an intermediate stop on the S22 between Bülach and Schaffhausen. It is a 38-minute ride from Zürich Hauptbahnhof.
