= Eglisau railway bridge =

Railway bridge in Eglisau, Switzerland

Coordinates: 47°34′39″N 8°30′36″E

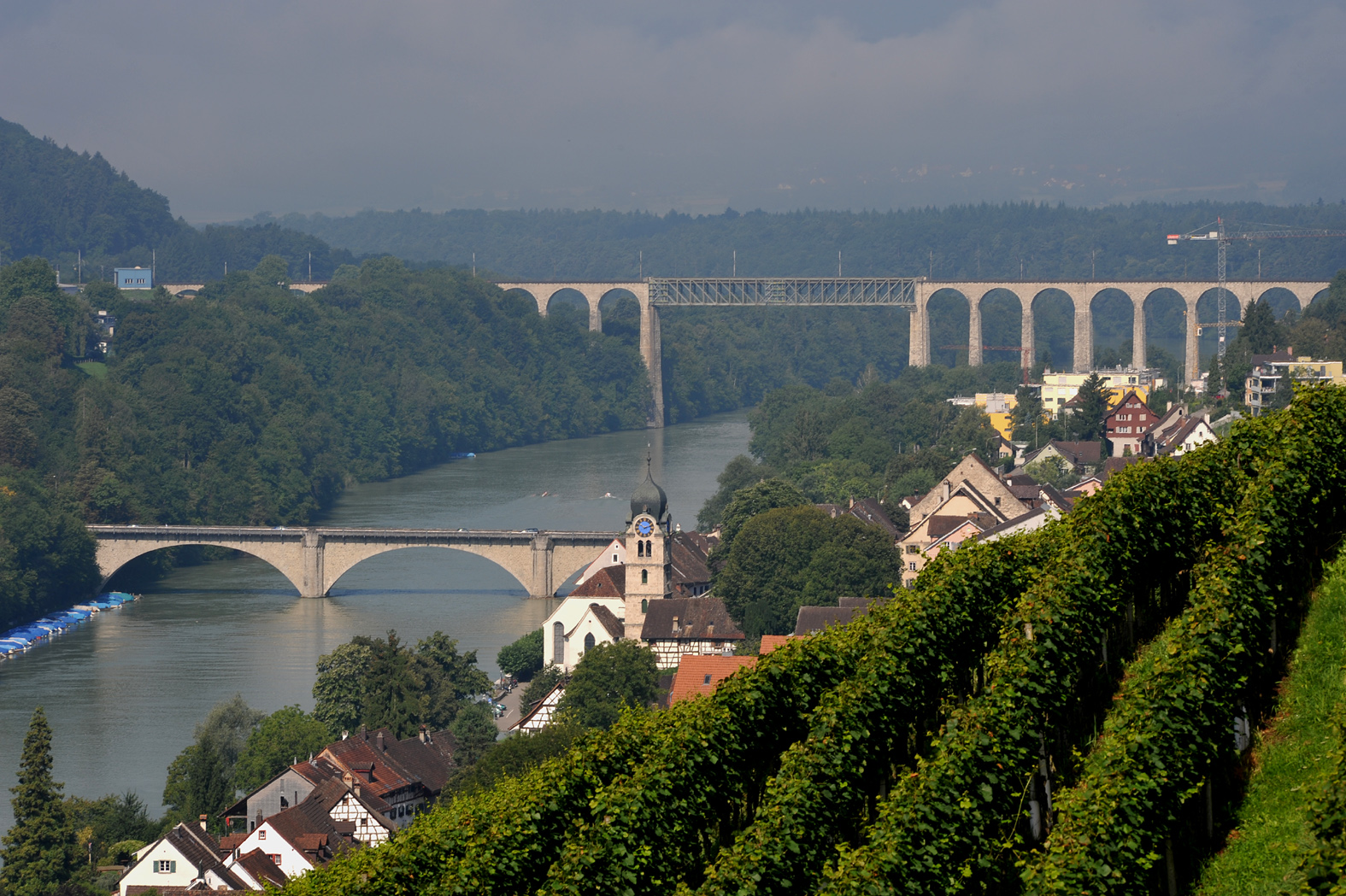
Road and rail bridges at Eglisau

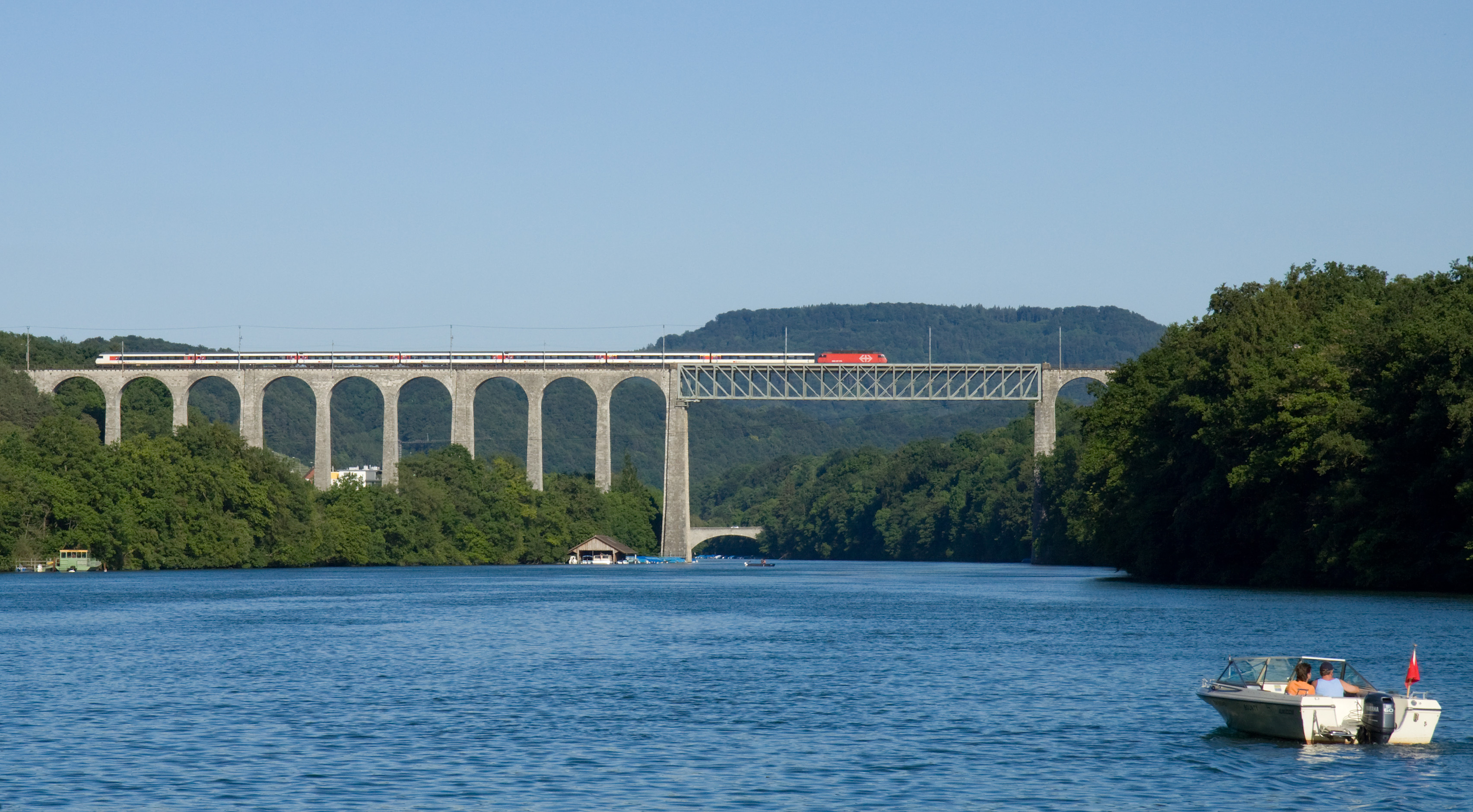
Passenger train crossing the bridge

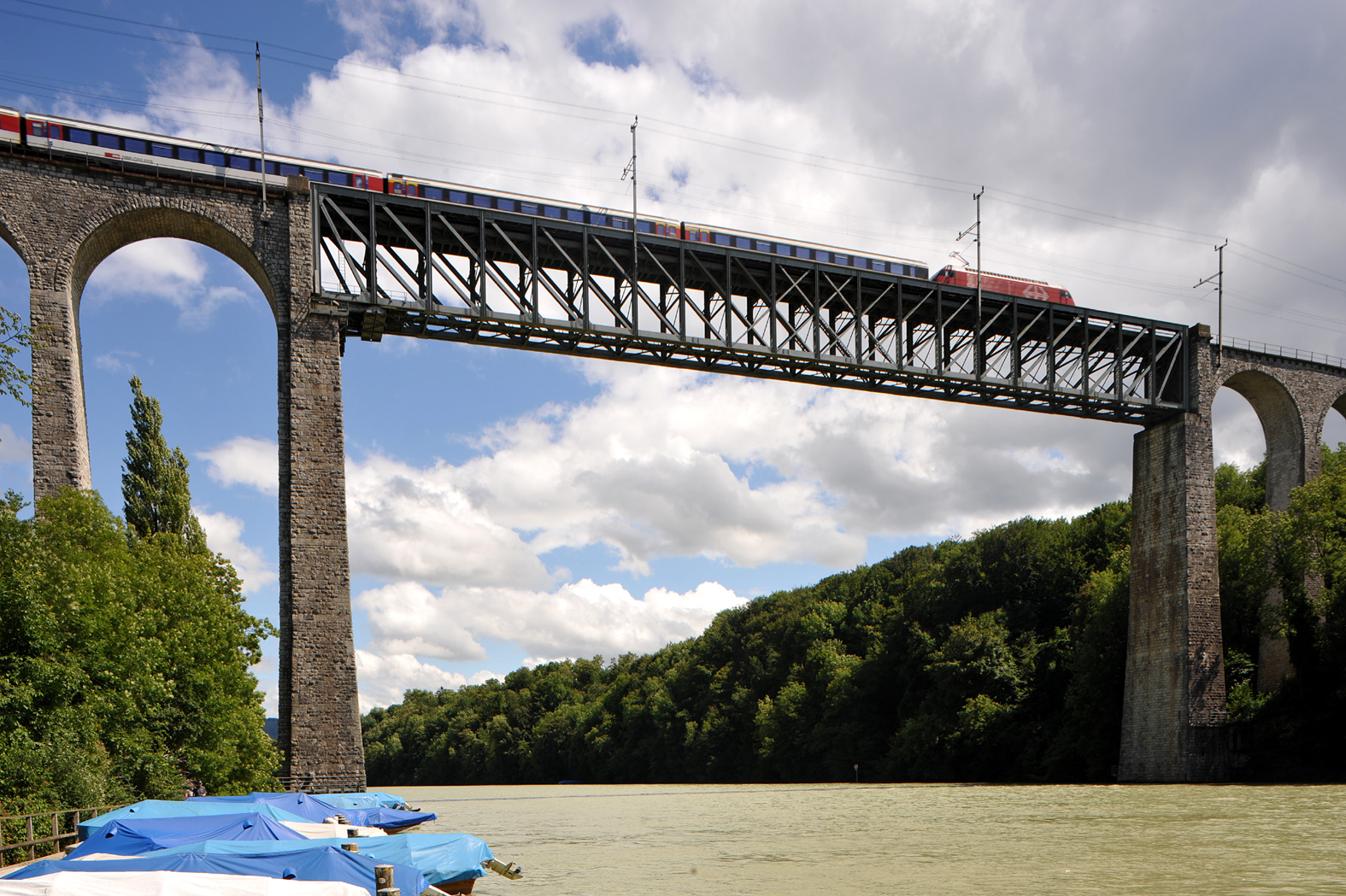
The bridge seen from below

The Eglisau railway bridge (German: Eisenbahnbrücke Eglisau) is a single-track railway bridge that carries train traffic across the River Rhine in the municipality of Eglisau, in the canton of Zurich, Switzerland. Built between 1895 and 1897, the bridge includes a central riveted steel truss and masonry arch viaducts. The full structure is 457 metres in long.

== Design and construction ==
The Eglisau railway bridge was built between 1895 and 1897 by the former Swiss Northeastern Railway (Schweizerische Nordostbahn). The bridge has a total length of 457 metres, with a central riveted steel truss with a span of 90 metres and a height of 9 metres. At both ends of the truss are approach bridges built from limestone blocks, with piers up to 50 metres high. In 1982–1983, the original Zores iron trackbed with ballast was replaced by a steel trough structure filled with ballast. During this same work, several truss joints were strengthened, and the steel components were recoated to protect them from corrosion.

From 2010, the bridge was monitored to assess fatigue. Strain data were collected over a year from key structural elements and analysed using Rainflow counting and the Palmgren–Miner rule. The findings, published in 2013, showed that the bridge met fatigue safety requirements. They also indicated a remaining service life of at least 50 years under expected traffic loads.

== See also ==
- List of bridges over the Rhine

== Bibliography ==
- Stadelmann, W (1989). "Rheinbrücken des 19. Jahrhunderts aus Eisen" [Rhine iron bridges of the 19th Century]. Schweiz.Ing.u.Architekt. ISSN 0251-0960.
