= Rafz railway station =

Swiss Federal Railway station in Rafz, Zurich Canton, Switzerland

Rafz
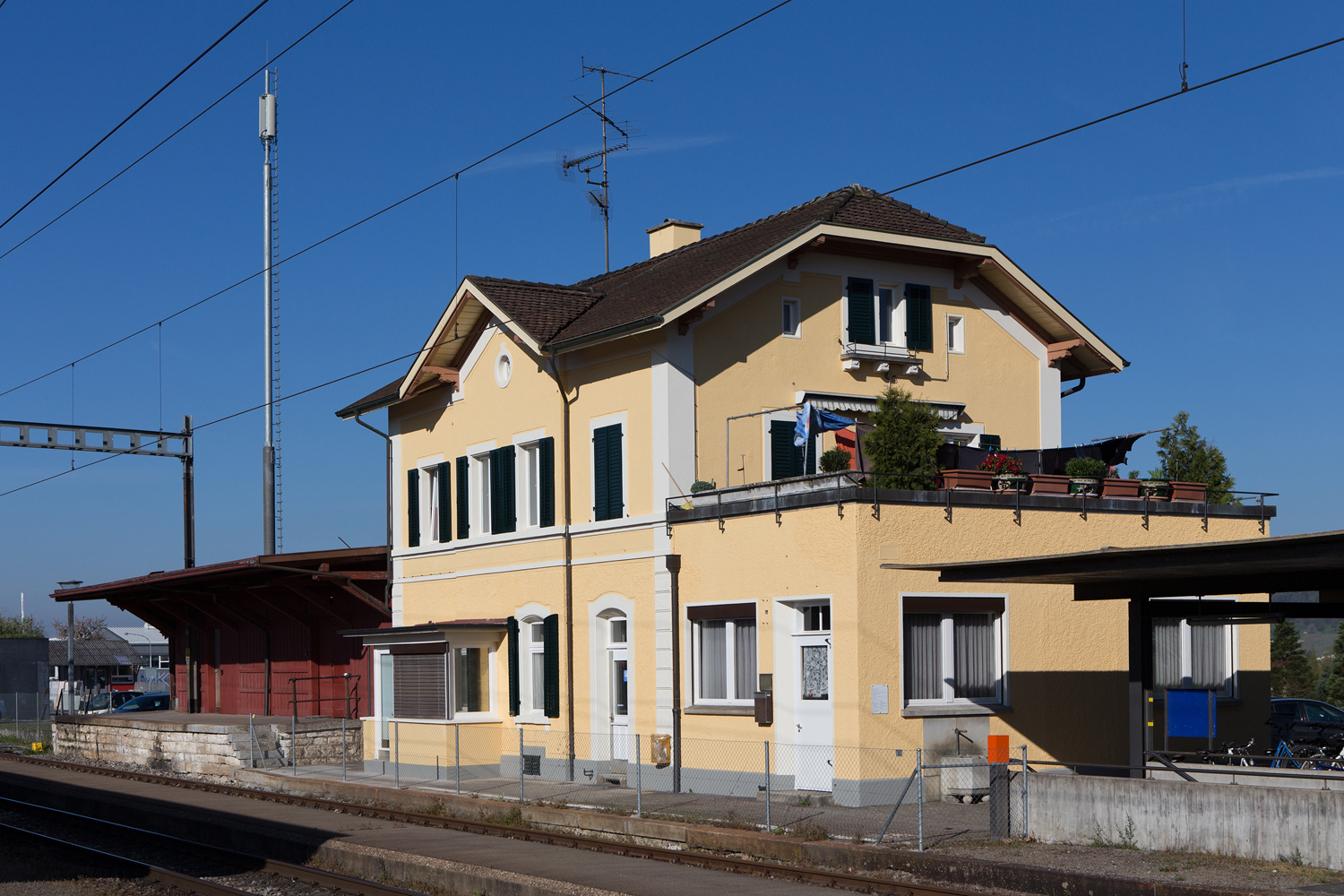

General information
- Location: Bahnhofstrasse; Rafz, Zurich; Switzerland
- Coordinates: 47.6034°N 8.543394°E
- Elevation: 424 m (1,391 ft)
- Owner: Swiss Federal Railways
- Operator: Swiss Federal Railways
- Line: Eglisau to Neuhausen line
- Platforms: 1 island platform
- Tracks: 5
- Connections: Zurich Transport Network (ZVV)
- Bus: PostAuto line 675

Other information
- Fare zone: 114 (ZVV); 847 (Ostwind Fare Network)

Services
Preceding station	Zurich S-Bahn	Following station
Lottstetten towards Schaffhausen	S9	Hüntwangen-Wil towards Uster
Lottstetten towards Schaffhausen	SN65 Limited service	Hüntwangen-Wil towards Bülach
Location
- Location within Switzerland Location within Canton of Zurich

Rafz is a railway station in the Swiss canton of Zurich and municipality of Rafz. The station is located on the Eglisau to Neuhausen line of the Swiss Federal Railway (SBB) that crosses the international border twice on its route between the Swiss cantons of Zurich and Schaffhausen. It is situated within both fare zone 114 of the Zürcher Verkehrsverbund (ZVV) and fare zone 847 of the Ostwind Fare Network.

== Services ==
The station is operated by the SBB and is served by Zurich S-Bahn line S9 that provides a half-hourly service between Zurich and Rafz, with alternate trains continuing to Schaffhausen.

- Zurich S-Bahn line S9: half-hourly service to Uster via Zürich HB, hourly service to/from Schaffhausen.

During weekends, there is also a Nighttime S-Bahn service (SN65) offered by ZVV.

- SN65: hourly service to Bülach and Schaffhausen.

Before the timetable revision in late 2015, the station was served by S-Bahn line S5 from Zurich, and an intermediate stop on the S22 between Bülach and Schaffhausen, which was curtailed from Bülach to Jestetten, in turn it no longer fell under the purview of the ZVV.

It is additionally served by a PostAuto bus route.

== Customs ==
As the next station is Lottstetten, which is in Germany, Rafz is a border station for passengers arriving from Germany. Customs checks may be performed aboard trains and in Rafz station by Swiss officials. Systematic passport controls were abolished when Switzerland joined the Schengen Area in 2008.

== Rafz train crash ==
On 20 February 2015, there was a collision between two trains at the station. The crash occurred at approximately 6.43 am. An S-Bahn and an Interregio express train collided.

The collision occurred as the Interregio train, which was running late, was passing through Rafz without stopping. The S-Bahn train was departing for Jestetten and was involved in a side-long collision, with the Interregio train coming from behind the S-Bahn train. The express was partially derailed, but the couplings held and no carriages overturned. The S-Bahn train was operated by Class 514 electric multiple unit 514 046-2. The InterRegio train was hauled by Class 460 electric locomotive No. 460 087-0.

The 49-year-old driver of the express was seriously injured. He was airlifted to hospital by helicopter. There were five other injuries requiring hospital treatment.

The Swiss Transportation Safety Investigation Board opened an investigation into the accident.

== See also ==
- Rail transport in Switzerland
