= S9 (ZVV) =

Railway service in Switzerland

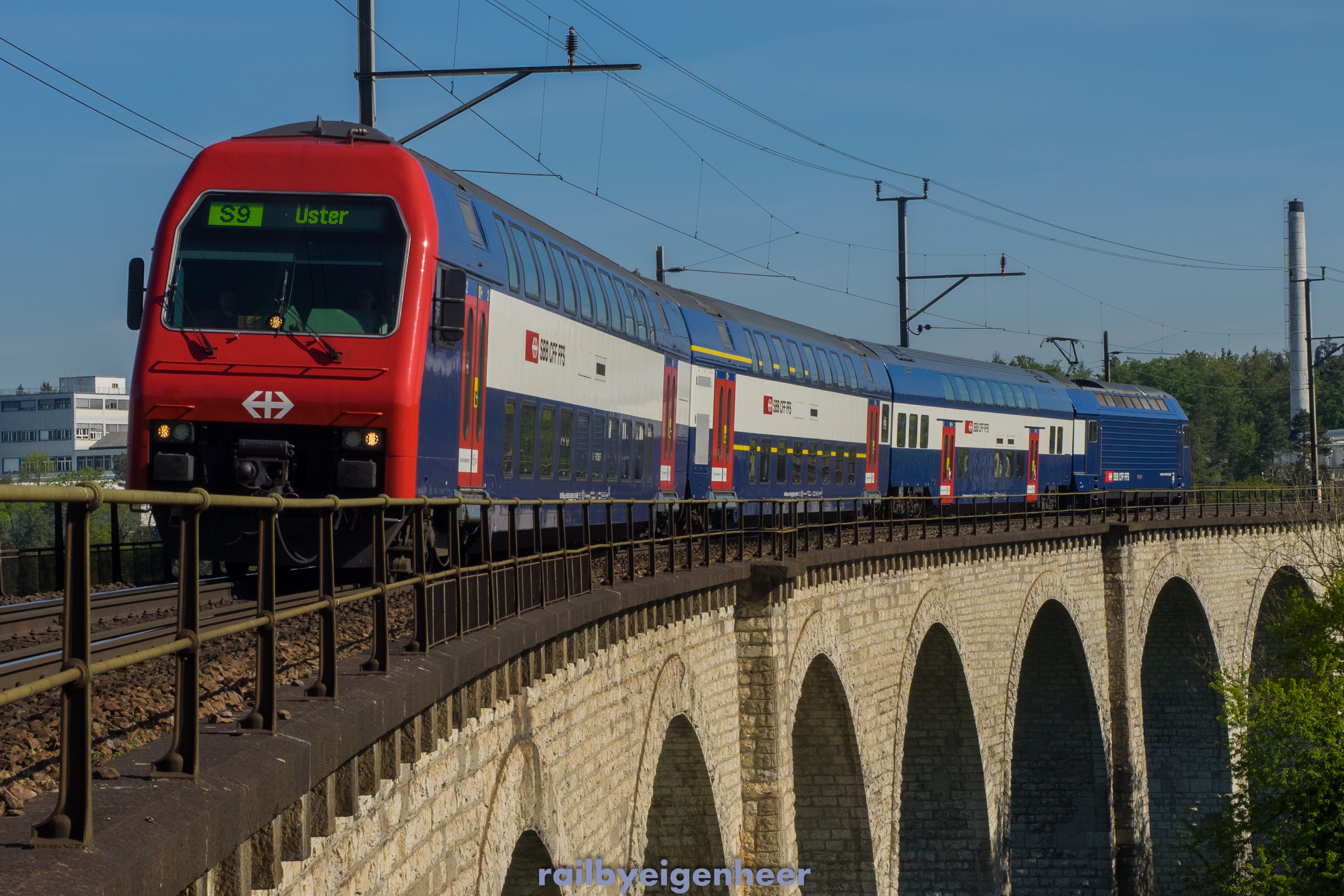
- S9 service on the Eglisau railway bridge over the Rhine

Overview
- Status: Operational
- Locale: Germany, Switzerland
- Termini: Schaffhausen; Uster
- Stations: 23
- Website: ZVV (in English)

Service
- Type: S-Bahn
- System: Zurich S-Bahn
- Operator(s): Zürcher Verkehrsverbund (ZVV)
- Rolling stock: Re 450 class + double-deck coaches

Technical
- Track gauge: 1,435 mm (4 ft 8 1/2 in)

The S9 is a regional railway line of the Zurich S-Bahn on the Zürcher Verkehrsverbund (ZVV), Zurich transportation network, and is one of the network's lines connecting the cantons of Zurich and Schaffhausen in Switzerland. Between the two Swiss cantons, the line also serves two stations in Germany.

Zurich S-Bahn network as of December 2018

At Zürich HB, trains of the S9 service usually depart from underground tracks (Gleis) 41–44 (Museumstrasse station).

== Route ==
- S9 (Schaffhausen–) Rafz–Hardbrücke–Zürich HB–Uster
  Operates every 30 minutes between Schaffhausen and Rafz only during rush hour, otherwise every hours.

The line runs from Schaffhausen, capital of the canton of Schaffhausen to Zürich Hauptbahnhof, before continuing via Zürich Stadelhofen to Uster. The following stations are served:

- Schaffhausen
- Neuhausen
- Neuhausen Rheinfall

Swiss-German border

- Jestetten (Germany)
- Lottstetten (Germany)

Swiss-German border

- Rafz
- Hüntwangen-Wil
- Eglisau
- Glattfelden
- Bülach
- Niederglatt
- Oberglatt
- Rümlang
- Glattbrugg
- Zürich Oerlikon
- Zürich Hardbrücke
- Zürich Hauptbahnhof
- Zürich Stadelhofen
- Stettbach
- Dübendorf
- Schwerzenbach
- Nänikon-Greifensee
- Uster

== Rolling stock ==
As of the December 2022 timetable change, all services are operated by Re 450 class locomotives pushing or pulling double-deck passenger carriages.

== Scheduling ==
Between Uster and Rafz, trains run every 30 minutes throughout the day. At peak periods all trains continue from Rafz to Schaffhausen, but at other times alternate trains terminate at Rafz. The journey time from Uster to Schaffhausen takes 82 minutes.

== History ==
Prior to the timetable revision of late 2015, the section of the S9 between Zurich and Uster operated much as today. However west of Zurich, the trains operated to Zug via Affoltern am Albis. The sections of line no longer covered by the S9 are now served by the S5.

== See also ==
- Rail transport in Switzerland
- List of railway stations in Zurich
- Public transport in Zurich
- ZVV fare zones
