= Rat (disambiguation) =

A rat is a rodent of the genus Rattus.

Rat, RAT, or Rats may also refer to:

== Places ==
- Rat, Novi Travnik, a village in Bosnia and Herzegovina
- Rat, Missouri, an unincorporated community
- Rat Island (disambiguation)
- Rat Islands, Alaska, United States
- Rat Lake (Aitkin County, Minnesota), United States
- Rat Lake (Cottonwood County, Minnesota), United States
- Rat Portage, the former name of Kenora, Ontario, Canada
- Rat River (disambiguation)

== People ==
- Rat (Ned's Atomic Dustbin) (active 1987–1995), stage name of guitarist Gareth Pring
- Rats (footballer) (born 1977), nickname of former Angolan footballer Ambrósio Pascoal
- Blek le Rat (born 1952), French graffiti artist
- Răzvan Raț (born 1981), Romanian footballer
- Vasiliy Rats (born 1961), Ukrainian footballer

== Technology ==
=== Computing ===
- Radio access technology, in networking
- RATS (software), a statistical software package for time series analysis
- Remote access trojan, malware

=== Aviation ===
- Ram air temperature, in aircraft
- Ram air turbine, in aircraft
- Rock Abrasion Tool, a NASA Mars Exploration Rover component
- CL-70 RAT (Remote Articulated Track), a Canadair vehicle
- Rocket Assisted Torpedo, later named RUR-5 ASROC

=== Others ===
- De Rat, IJlst, a windmill in the Netherlands
- Rapid antigen test, a kind of medical diagnostic

== Arts and entertainment ==
=== Characters ===
- Rat (Pearls Before Swine), a comic strip character
- Rat Rathbone, in Robert Muchamore's CHERUB spy novel series
- Theodore Donald "Rat" Finch, a computer hacker in the 2003 film The Core

=== Films ===
- Rat (film), a 2000 Irish comedy
- Rats (2016 film), an American documentary horror film
- Rats! (film), a 2024 American independent comedy
- Rats, a 2013 short film starring Romaine Waite
- Rat, a 1998 documentary by Mark Lewis
- Rats: Night of Terror, a 1984 Italian film

=== Music ===
- Rats (album), 1994, by Sass Jordan
- "Rats" (Ghost song), 2018
- "Rats" (The Kinks song), 1970
- "Rats", a song by The Automatics from the album Not Accepted Anywhere
- "Rats", a song by Pearl Jam from the album Vs.
- "Rät", a song by Penelope Scott

=== Other ===
- Rats (advertisement), a 2000 political ad
- "Rat" (short story), by James Patrick Kelly
- "Rats" (short story), by M. R. James
- "Rats", an episode of The Protector
- Rats!, a 1998 2D platform video game

== Other uses ==
- Rat (zodiac), a Chinese zodiac sign
- Rat or shoulder tender, a cut of beef
- Rat, slang for an informant, or to inform
- Rat, a device for forming a hair bun
- Pro Co RAT, a guitar distortion pedal
- Rat (newspaper), a New York City underground newspaper
- The Remote Associates Test of creativity potential
- Rat, a colloquial name for muskrat

== See also ==
- The Rat (disambiguation)
- The Rats (disambiguation)
- Rât (disambiguation)
- RAT test (disambiguation)
- Raat (disambiguation)
- Ratt (disambiguation)
- RRAT, rotating radio transients
- Lab rat (disambiguation)
- Tunnel Rat (G.I. Joe), a fictional character
