= SBB Re 450 =

Swiss S-Bahn locomotive

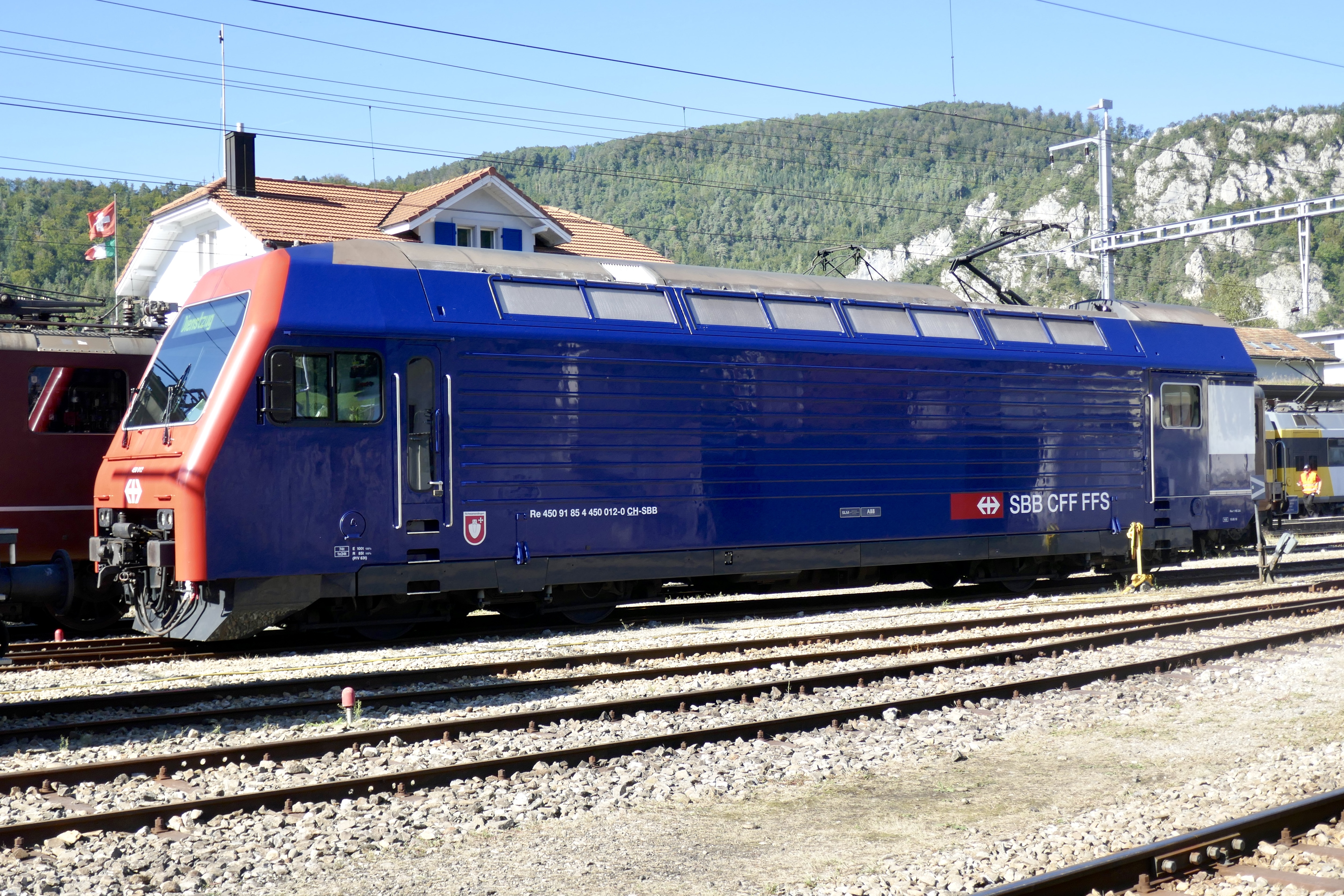
- Re 450 012 locomotive ("Schwamendingen") in Balsthal
Type and origin
- Power type: Electric
- Builder: SLM, ABB, SIG
- Build date: 1989–1997
- Total produced: 115
- Rebuild date: 2011–2018
Specifications
- Configuration
  - UIC: Bo′Bo′
- Gauge: 1,435 mm / 4 ft 8 1/2 in standard gauge
- Bogies: 2
- Length: 18.4 m (60 ft 4 in)
- Width: 2.98 m (9 ft 9 in)
- Height: 4.5 m (14 ft 9 in)
- Loco weight: 74 tonnes (72.8 long tons; 81.6 short tons)
- Electric system/s: 15 kV 16 2/3 Hz AC (nominal) from overhead catenary
- Current pickup: Pantograph
- Traction motors: 4 FRA 3435
- Safety systems: Integra-Signum, ZUB
Performance figures
- Maximum speed: 130 km/h (81 mph)
Career
- Operators: Swiss Federal Railways
- Numbers: Re 450 000 – Re 450 114

The Re 450 is a push-pull electric locomotive of Swiss Federal Railways (SBB CFF FFS), which combined with passenger coaches is only used for commuter rail services of Zurich S-Bahn in the metropolitan area of Zurich. Under the old Swiss class system, they would have been known as Re 4/4^{V}.

Each Re 450 is used in formations of three double-deck passenger carriages, the last of which has a driving cab to allow push-pull working. At peak-hour times, trainsets may be coupled together to form a train consisting of three locomotives and nine passenger vehicles. Most Zurich S-Bahn lines use this stock and it is the most common on the network. The trainsets are also known as DPZ, short for Doppelstock-Pendelzug (lit. 'double-decker commuter train'), which was the first double-decker train type operated by SBB CFF FFS following successful trials of a French VO 2N bilevel train borrowed from SNCF in the early 1980s.

In 2008, two Re 450 trainsets, with locomotives Re 450 067 and Re 450 070, were sold to Sihltal Zürich Uetliberg Bahn (SZU), where they are now designated as Re 456 551-1 and 552-9, respectively.

All Re 450-hauled trainsets received a mid-life refurbishment at the SBB CFF FFS workshops in Yverdon-les-Bains between 2011 and 2018 (now named DPZplus). The livery was changed: the formerly yellow doors are now painted red on the coaches and dark blue on the locomotives, and the front now shows the SBB logo instead of only the vehicle number. Each trainset now includes one low-loader wagon for easier access.

== Numbering and naming ==
All 115 Re 450 locomotives are numbered (000–114) and each is named after a commune, mostly of the canton of Zurich. The numbers are indicated at the front and sides of the locomotive, the names (with the commune's coat of arms) are displayed on the side of the engine.

The following is a list of Re 450 locomotives with their respective number and name.

List of Re 450 locomotives
№	Name	Notes
Re 450 000	Seebach	
Re 450 001	Schwerzenbach	
Re 450 002	Oberwinterthur	
Re 450 003	Zollikon	
Re 450 004	Stettbach	
Re 450 005	Kilchberg	
Re 450 006	Rafz	
Re 450 007	Fehraltorf	
Re 450 008	Riesbach	
Re 450 009	Hedingen	
Re 450 010	Steinmaur	
Re 450 011	Oberrieden	
Re 450 012	Schwamendingen	
Re 450 013	Niederglatt	
Re 450 014	Männedorf	
Re 450 015	Erlenbach	
Re 450 016	Altstetten	ZKB special livery, coat of arms removed
Re 450 017	Bubikon	
Re 450 018	Hirslanden Hottingen	
Re 450 019	Stäfa	
Re 450 020	Pfäffikon	
Re 450 021	Seuzach	
Re 450 022	Richterswil	
Re 450 023	Greifensee	
Re 450 024	Pfungen	
Re 450 025	Winterthur Seen	
Re 450 026	Birmensdorf	
Re 450 027	Zürich Enge	
Re 450 028	Uerikon	
Re 450 029	Altikon	
Re 450 030	Rümlang	
Re 450 031	Wald	
Re 450 032	Mettmenstetten	
Re 450 033	Thalheim	
Re 450 034	Oberweningen	
Re 450 035	Schöfflisdorf	
Re 450 036	Dietlikon	
Re 450 037	Niederweningen	
Re 450 038	Wollishofen	
Re 450 039	Embrach	
Re 450 040	Hinwil	
Re 450 041	Buchs Dällikon	
Re 450 042	Hettlingen	
Re 450 043	Rorbas	
Re 450 044	Henggart	
Re 450 045	Feldbach	
Re 450 046	Zürich Affoltern	
Re 450 047	Seegräben	
Re 450 048	Elgg ZH	
Re 450 049	Nänikon	
Re 450 050	Wien	
Re 450 051	Kleinandelfingen	
Re 450 052	Lottstetten	
Re 450 053	Witikon	
Re 450 054	Oberglatt	
Re 450 055	Küsnacht ZH	
Re 450 056	Otelfingen	
Re 450 057	Dielsdorf	
Re 450 058	Niederhasli	
Re 450 059	Knonau	
Re 450 060	Glattfelden	
Re 450 061	Mönchaltorf	
Re 450 062	Gossau ZH	
Re 450 063	Hombrechtikon	
Re 450 064	City of Osaka	
Re 450 065	Bonstetten	
Re 450 066	Neerach	
~~Re 450 067~~	Urdorf	Sold to SZU, coat of arms removed
Re 450 068	Waltalingen	
Re 450 069	Wiesendangen	
~~Re 450 070~~	Wülflingen	Sold to SZU, coat of arms removed
Re 450 071	Altenburg	
Re 450 072	Rheinau	
Re 450 073	Wettswil a.A.	
Re 450 074	Stadel	
Re 450 075	Ossingen	
Re 450 076	Unterstammheim	
Re 450 077	Oberstammheim	
Re 450 078	Au ZH	
Re 450 079	Jestetten	
Re 450 080	Rüschlikon	
Re 450 081	Weiningen	
Re 450 082	Feuerthalen	
Re 450 083	Trüllikon	
Re 450 084	Neftenbach	
Re 450 085	Rickenbach ZH	
Re 450 086	Benken ZH	
Re 450 087	Zell ZH	
Re 450 088	Wangen SZ	
Re 450 089	Bäretswil	
Re 450 090	Turbenthal	
Re 450 091	Dürnten	
Re 450 092	Wila	
Re 450 093	Wil ZH	
Re 450 094	Hüntwangen	
Re 450 095	Wasterkingen	
Re 450 096	Winterthur Veltheim	
Re 450 097	Maur	
Re 450 098	Grüningen	
Re 450 099	Volketswil	
Re 450 100	Rudolfingen	
Re 450 101	Obfelden	
Re 450 102	Wangen-Brüttisellen	
Re 450 103	Marthalen	
Re 450 104	Zürich Aussersihl Zürich Hard	
Re 450 105	Herrliberg	
Re 450 106	Winterthur Töss	
Re 450 107	Maschwanden	
Re 450 108	Uetikon	
Re 450 109	Kappel a./A.	
Re 450 110	Hittnau	
Re 450 111	Neuenhof	
Re 450 112	Flurlingen	
Re 450 113	Humlikon Adlikon	
Re 450 114	Dänikon	

== Gallery ==
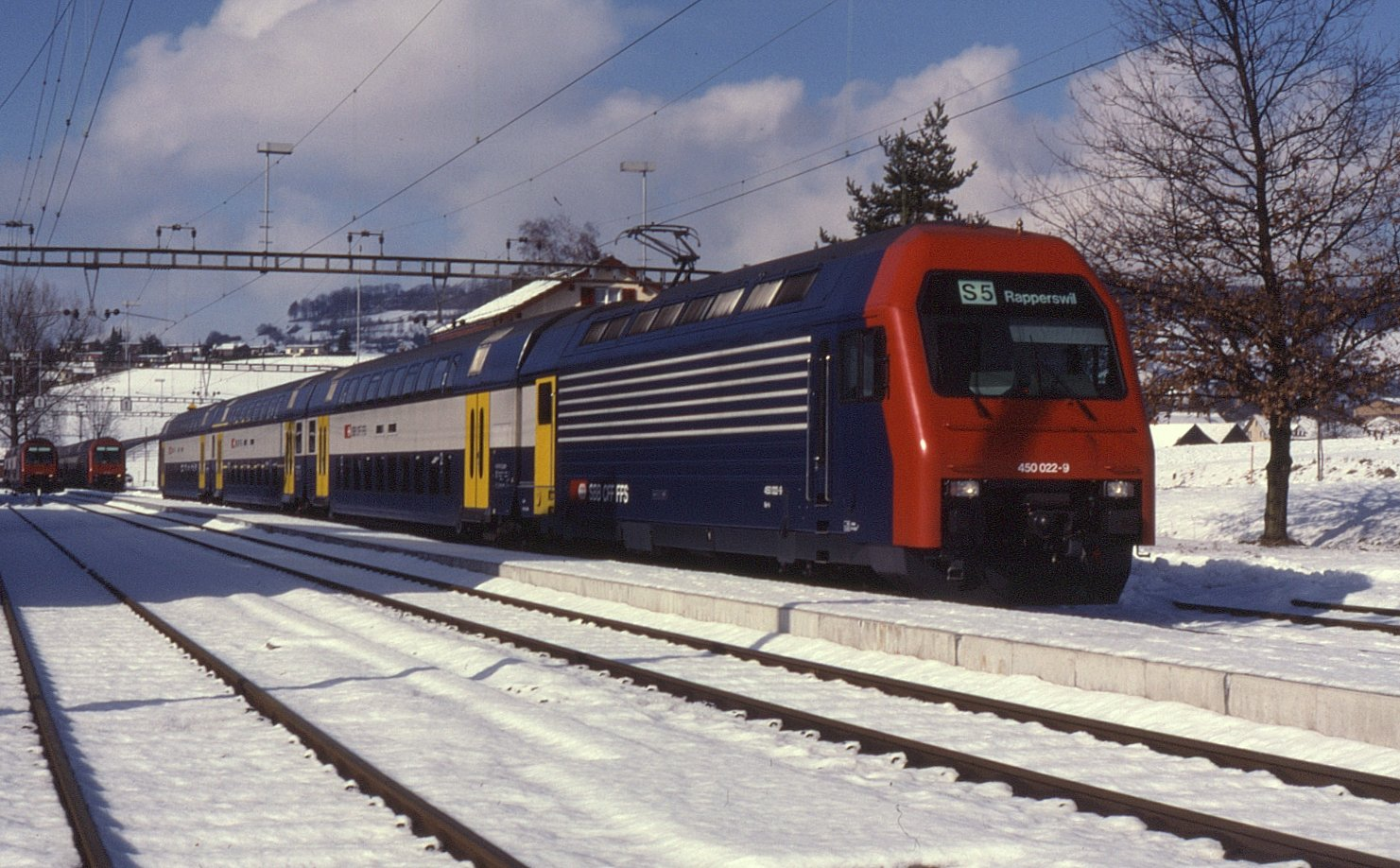
Re 450 022-hauled trainset with original DPZ livery in 1991

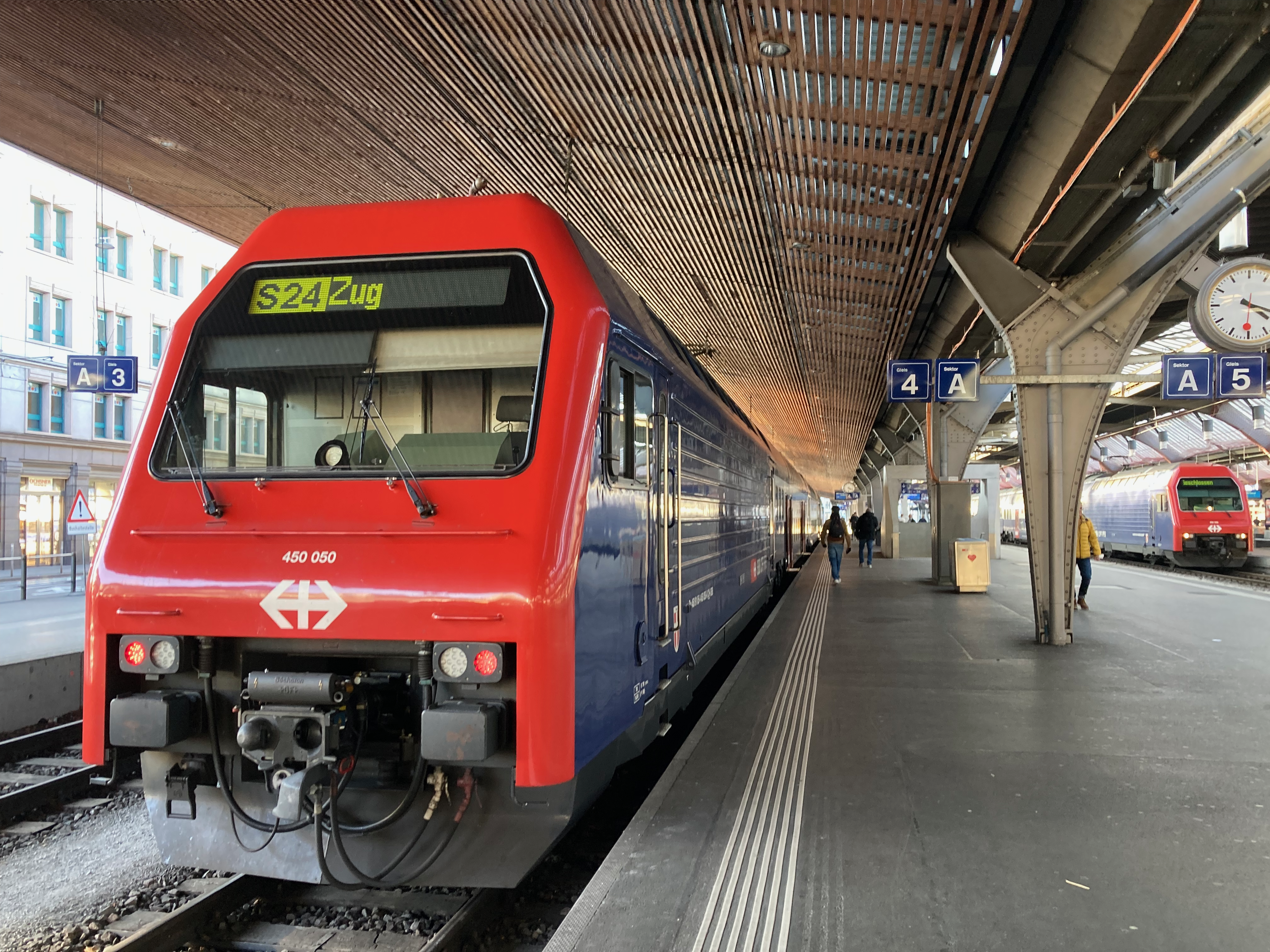
Two refurbished Re 450 locomotives at Zurich HB in 2022

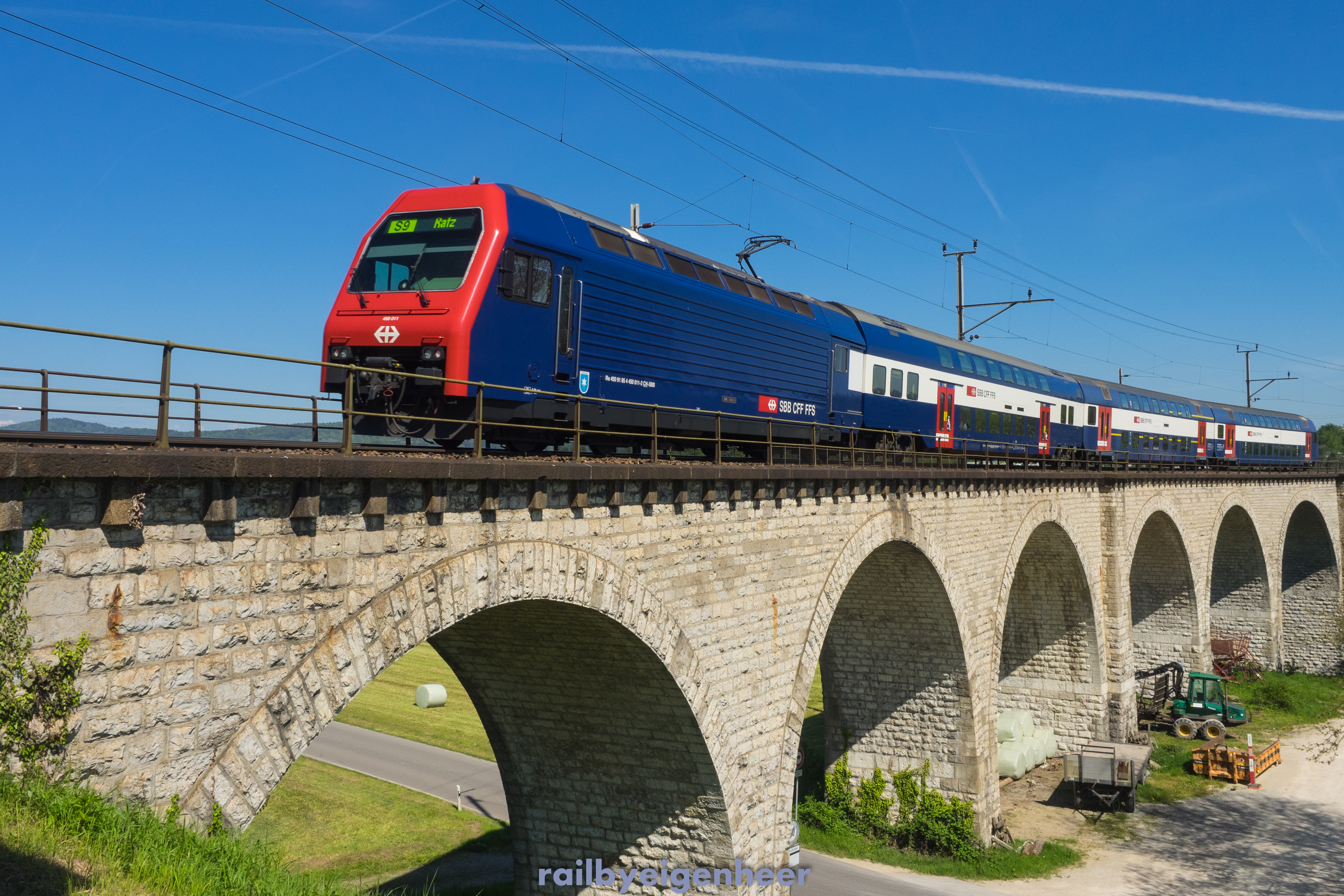
Refurbished Re 450 locomotive and coaches (DPZplus) on the Eglisau railway bridge in 2016, with low-loader coach behind the locomotive

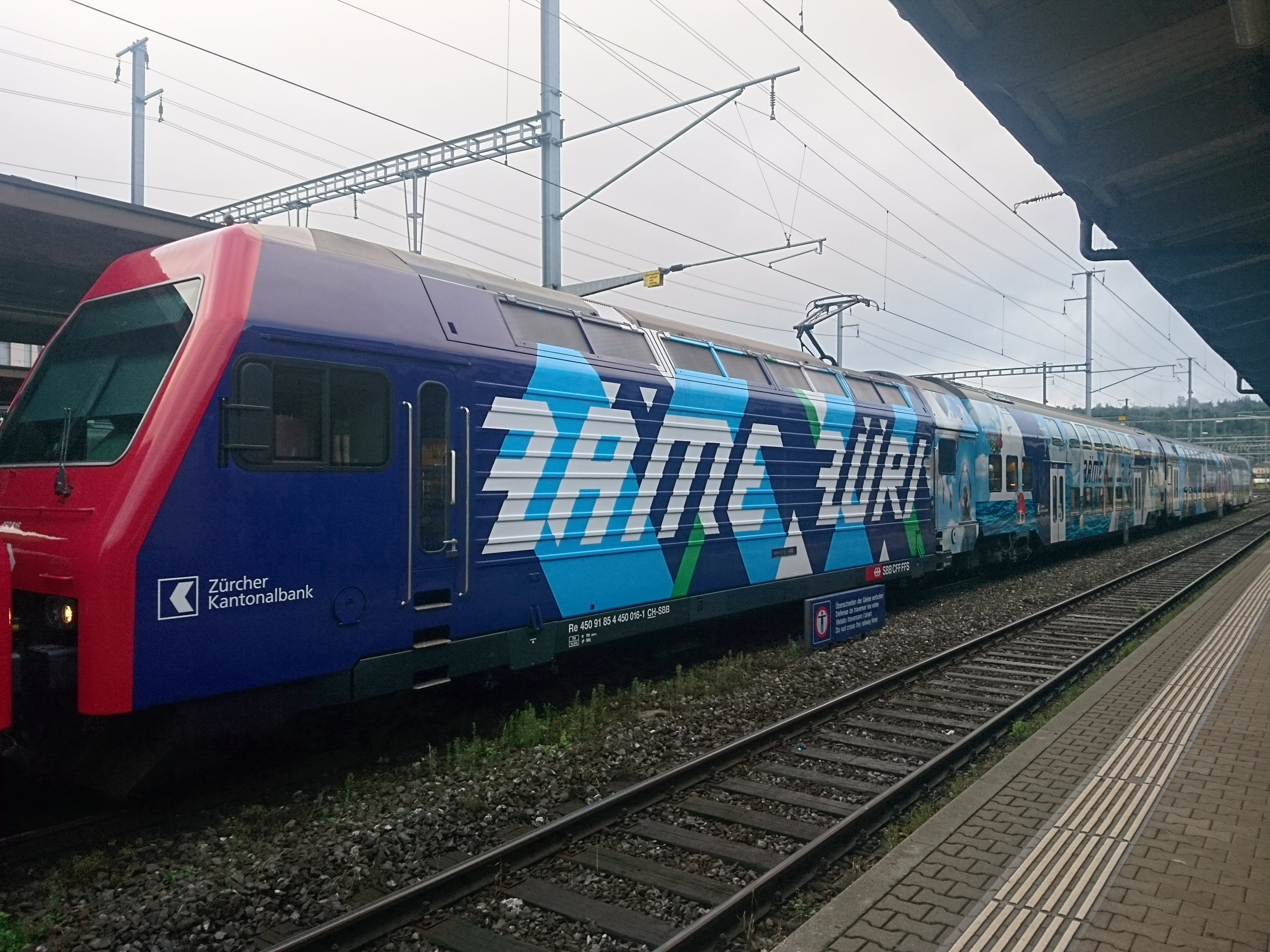
Re 450 016 "Altstetten" in ZKB special livery

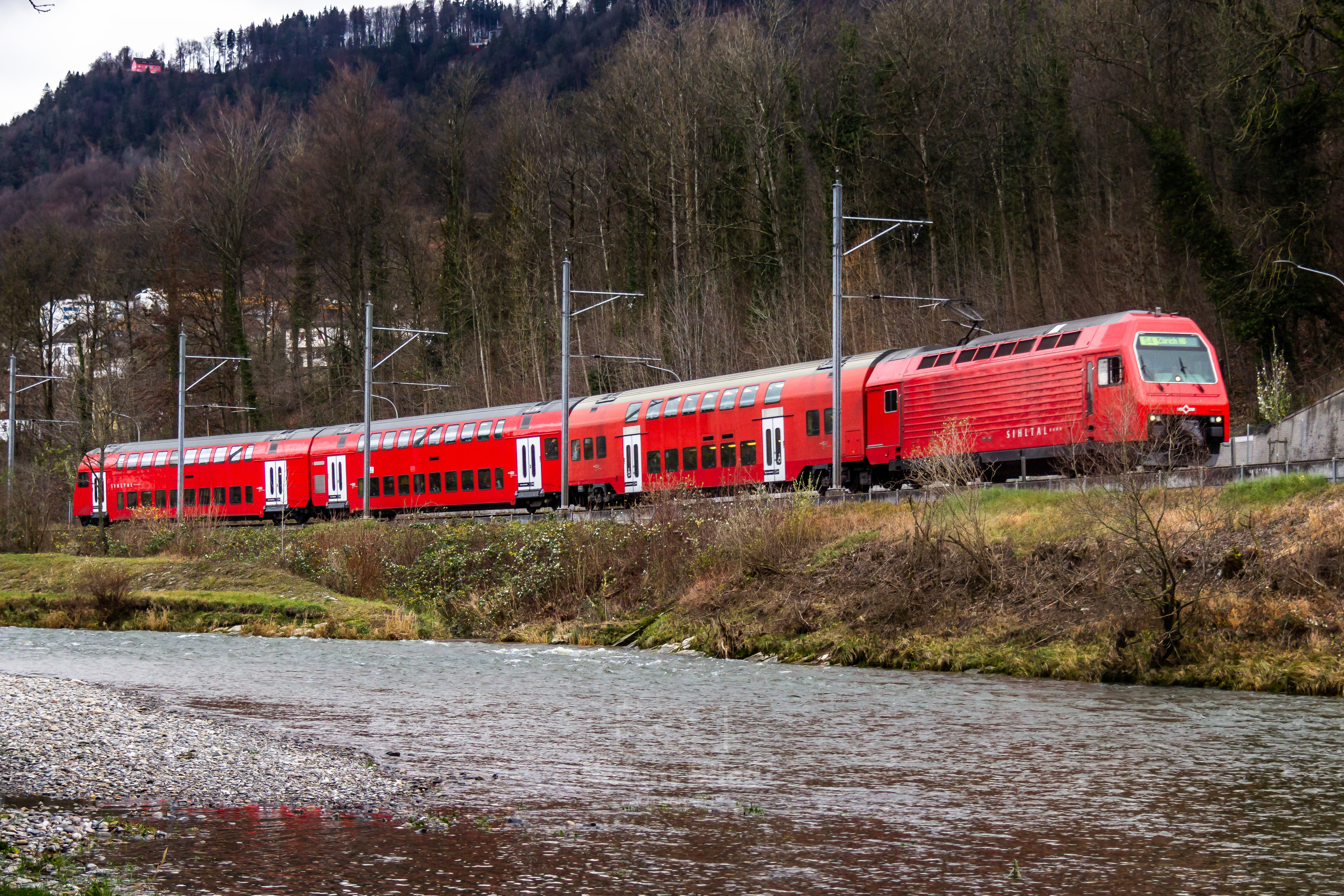
SZU Re 456 (former SBB Re 450) on the Sihltal railway line as S4 service of Zurich S-Bahn

Re 450 interior

== See also ==
- List of stock used by Swiss Federal Railways
- Swiss locomotive and railcar classification
