= RATS =

RATS may refer to:

- RATS (software), Regression Analysis of Time Series, a statistical package
- Robot Astronomy Talk Show, an animated educational series that's part of NASA's IRrelevant Astronomy vodcast
- Regional Anti-Terrorist Structure, the Shanghai Cooperation Organisation's anti-terrorism branch

== See also ==
- Rat (disambiguation)
- The Rat (disambiguation)
- The Rats (disambiguation)
