= Lab rat (disambiguation) =

A laboratory rat is a rat of the species Rattus norvegicus which is bred and kept for scientific research.

Labrat, lab rat, or lab rats may also refer to:

== People and characters ==
- Dunash ben Labrat (920–990), medieval Jewish commentator, poet, and grammarian
- Paul "Lab Rat" Squirfenherder, a fictional character from the animated TV series Grossology
- The Lab Rats, a player option in the boardgame Gammarauders
- Lab Rat, a recurring villain in SuperKitties

== Television ==
- "Lab Rats", a seventh-season episode of the TV series CSI: Crime Scene Investigation
- Lab Rats (British TV series), a BBC 2 sitcom that began airing in 2008
- Lab Rats (American TV series), a Disney XD sitcom that began airing in 2012
  - Lab Rats: Elite Force, a 2016 Disney XD sitcom spinoff of the American TV series
- Lab Rats Challenge, an Australian game show
- "Lab Rats" (Smart Guy), a 1997 episode

== Other ==
- Portal 2: Lab Rat, a digital comic published in 2011 to promote the video game Portal 2
- Lab Rats, a 2018 non-fiction book written by Dan Lyons

== See also ==
- Laboratory (disambiguation)
- Lab (disambiguation)
- Rat (disambiguation)
- RAT test (disambiguation)
