= Rác (surname) =

Rác, Racz, Rátz, Morác, Moracz, or Morasch are Hungarian language surnames derived from two Hungarian exonyms for Serbs:
Rascians (people from Rascia), which was based on the largest medieval Serbian state; and Moravac, which denoted Serbs originating from central Serbia and the Morava river region. In some towns in Hungary, Rác also applies as an exonym for certain subgroup of Croats who live in present-day Hungary, who are referred to as "Rac Croats", "Papal Rascians (hu. Pápista Rácok)", or simply "Catholic Rascians".

It may refer to:

- Aladár Rácz (1886–1958), Hungarian cimbalom player
- Andy Racz (born 1930), American soccer player
- Andre Racz (1916-1994), American printmaker and educator
- Ferenc Rácz (born 1991), Hungarian football player
- Gabor B. Racz (born 1937), American physician
- István Rácz (botanist) (born 1952), Hungarian botanist
- János Rácz (1941–2023), Hungarian basketball player
- Jenő Rácz (Minister of Finance) (1907–1981), Hungarian politician
- József Rácz (born 1957), Hungarian physician, psychiatrist
- Lajos Rácz (born 1952), Hungarian wrestler
- László Rác Szabó (born 1957), Serbian politician
- László Rátz (1863-1930) Hungarian mathematician
- Mihaly Racz Rajna (born 1934), Hungarian actor
- Róbert Rácz (born 1967), Hungarian politician
- Sándor Rácz (1933–2013), Hungarian politician
- Vali Racz (1911–1997), Hungarian singer and actress
- Vilmos Rácz (1889–1976), Hungarian athlete
- Vasyl Rats (born in 1961, in Hungarian Rácz László) Soviet footballer
- Zsófia Rácz (born 1988), Hungarian football player

== See also ==
- Rácalmás
- Ráckeve
- Rácpentele
- Rascia
- Raška (region)
- Serbs in Hungary
- Croats in Hungary
- Rascians
- RAC (disambiguation)
- RATS (disambiguation)
- Ratz (disambiguation)
- Hungarians in Serbia
