= Rat Lake =

Rat Lake may refer to:

- Rat Lake (Aitkin County, Minnesota)
- Rat Lake (Cottonwood County, Minnesota)
