= Hochfelden =

Hochfelden may refer to:

- Hochfelden, Bas-Rhin, France
- Hochfelden, Switzerland
