= Raat =

RAAT or Raat may refer to:

- Raat (film), 1992 Indian horror film
- a section of Stadel bei Niederglatt municipality, Zürich, Switzerland
- John Raat, New Zealand footballer
- Marko Raat (born 1973), Estonian film director, scenarist and cameraman
- Ralph van Raat (born 1978), Dutch pianist
- Riek de Raat (1918–2018), Dutch communist, resistance fighter and artist

== See also ==
- Rat (disambiguation)
- Ratt (disambiguation)
- Raats (disambiguation)
- RRAT
