= Höri =

- Municipality
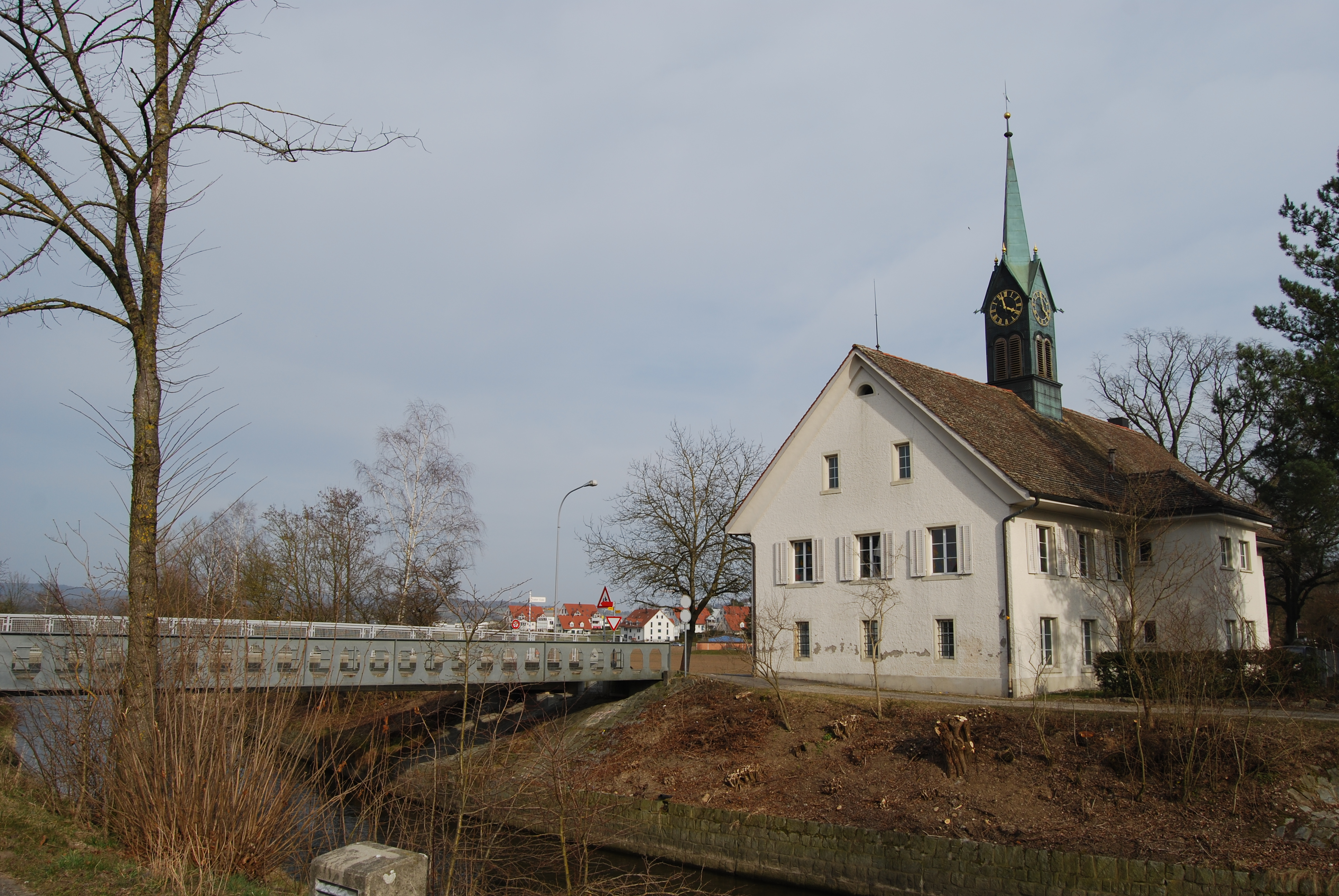

- Flag Coat of arms
- Location of Höri
- Location within Switzerland Location within Canton of Zurich
- Coordinates: 47°30′N 8°31′E
- Country: Switzerland
- Canton: Zurich
- District: Bülach

Area
  - Total: 4.85 km^{2} (1.87 sq mi)
- Elevation: 412 m (1,352 ft)

Population (December 2020)
  - Total: 2,951
  - Density: 608/km^{2} (1,580/sq mi)
- Time zone: UTC+01:00 (CET)
  - Summer (DST): UTC+02:00 (CEST)
- Postal code: 8181
- SFOS number: 60
- ISO 3166 code: CH-ZH
- Surrounded by: Bachenbülach, Bülach, Hochfelden, Neerach, Niederglatt, Oberglatt
- Website: www.hoeri.ch

Höri is a municipality in the district of Bülach in the canton of Zürich in Switzerland, and belongs to the Glatt Valley (German: Glattal).

== History ==
Höri is first mentioned in 1149 (877 years ago) as Hoerein.

== Geography ==
Höri has an area of 4.8 km^{2} (1.9 sq mi). Of this area, 59.3% is used for agricultural purposes, while 12.7% is forested. Of the rest of the land, 18% is settled (buildings or roads) and the remainder (10%) is non-productive (rivers, glaciers or mountains).

The municipality straddles the Glatt river with the communities of Ober- and Niederhöri on the western side and Endhöri (earlier known as Ennethöri) on the east.

== Demographics ==
Höri has a population (as of 31 December 2020) of 2,951. As of 2007, 30.1% of the population was made up of foreign nationals. Over the last 10 years the population has grown at a rate of 16.4%. Most of the population (as of 2000) speaks German (76.6%), with Italian being second most common (9.4%) and Albanian being third ( 5.1%).

In the 2007 election the most popular party was the SVP which received 57.8% of the vote. The next three most popular parties were the SPS (14.5%), the CSP (9.9%) and the FDP (6.4%).

The age distribution of the population (as of 2000) is children and teenagers (0–19 years old) make up 25.8% of the population, while adults (20–64 years old) make up 64.4% and seniors (over 64 years old) make up 9.8%. In Höri about 62.6% of the population (between age 25-64) have completed either non-mandatory upper secondary education or additional higher education (either university or a Fachhochschule).

Höri has an unemployment rate of 3.29%. As of 2005, there were 46 people employed in the primary economic sector and about 16 businesses involved in this sector. 502 people are employed in the secondary sector and there are 51 businesses in this sector. 397 people are employed in the tertiary sector, with 80 businesses in this sector.

The historical population is given in the following table:

year	population
1467	c. 55
1634	257
1790	355
1850	574
1900	515
1941	471
1950	569
1970	2,103
2000	2,300
