= Las ratas =

Las Ratas may refer to:

- Las ratas (novel), a 1962 novel by Miguel Delibes, and a 1997 film
- Las ratas an Argentine film of 1963 by Luis Saslavsky
- "Las ratas", a story in the 2014 Spanish anthology film Wild Tales
- Las ratas, a small volcano in Santiago Tianguistenco municipality, Mexico

== See also ==
- The Rats (disambiguation)
