= Glatt (Rhine) =

River in Switzerland

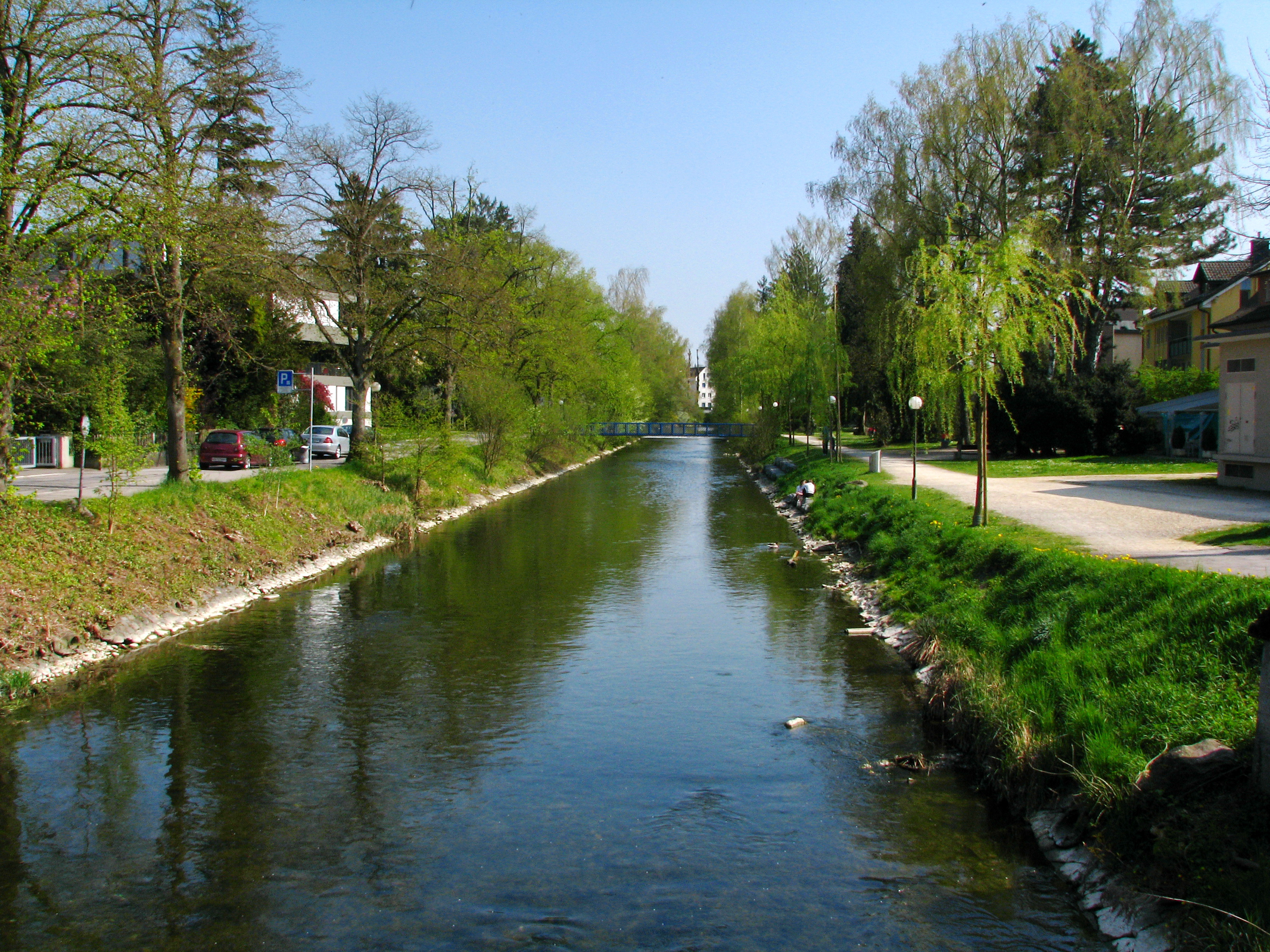
- At Dübendorf

Location
- Country: Switzerland
- Canton: Zürich

Physical characteristics
- Source
  - location: Greifensee
  - elevation: 435 m (1,427 ft)
- Mouth
  - location: Rhine (Rheinsfelden)
  - coordinates: 47.5740°N 8.4709°E
  - elevation: 356 m (1,168 ft)
- Length: 35.7 km (22.2 mi)

Basin features
- Progression: Rhine→ North Sea

Glatt (German pronunciation: [ɡlat]) is the name of a lesser affluent to the High Rhine in the Unterland of the canton of Zurich, Switzerland. It is 35.7 kilometres (22.2 mi) long and flows out from the Greifensee through the Glatt Valley, discharging into the Rhine by Glattfelden. Whereas the upper reaches are only gently inclined, the stream gets steeper beneath, forming banks of bed load.

== Name and History ==
The earliest mention of the Glatt (fluvii, qui dicitur glat) dates to 1034. The hydronym reflects the (feminine) OHG adjective glat, meaning either "bright, clear" or "plane, smooth". Since the 15th century, the Glatt had been subject to the sovereignty of the city of Zurich, the council of which assigned the custody over the river to two reeves (Glattvögte) in the 16th century.

Several toponyms have the name 'Glatt' in it, such as Glattbrugg, Glattfelden, Glattpark, Glattalbahn, Glattzentrum, Niederglatt and Oberglatt.

After a first attempt to regulate the stream in 1593 and a rudimentary project in the early 19th century, the largest reshapings took place during the time from 1878 to 1895. In 1936, another straightening was carried out as a preliminary work to the construction of the Zurich Airport as well as to land improvement and future overbuilding. Due to the last regulation works in 1975 between Niederglatt and the Glatt's confluence to the Rhine, the hydroelectric power stations built in the late 19th century at the lower course of the stream disappeared.

The Glatt was formerly abounding with fish. Owing to the accelerated growth of Zurich's agglomeration during the 20th century and the insufficiency of the purification plants built in the 1960s, it has been strongly polluted; from 1994 to 2002, the sewage system was restructured by driving a tunnel between the Glatt Valley and the Limmat Valley.

== See also ==
- Rivers of Switzerland
