= Ratt (disambiguation) =

Ratt or RATT may refer to:

- Ratt, an American glam metal band.
  - Ratt (album), the sixth album of the band Ratt
  - Ratt (EP), self-titled extended play record from the band Ratt
  - Ratt: The Video, video by the band Ratt
- “Ratt", Commodore 64 programmer Antony Crowther
- Radioteletype, a telecommunications system sometimes known by the acronym RATT (Radio Automatic Teletype)
- Regia Autonomă de Transport Timişoara (RATT), the tram system of Timișoara, Romania
- Rescue All Terrain Transport (RATT), US Air Force special operations casualties vehicle

== See also ==
- Raat (disambiguation)
- Rat (disambiguation)
- RRAT
