= Hochfelden, Switzerland =

Hochfelden
- Municipality
- Flag Coat of arms
- Location of Hochfelden
- Location within Switzerland Location within Canton of Zurich
- Coordinates: 47°31′N 8°31′E
- Country: Switzerland
- Canton: Zurich
- District: Bülach

Area
  - Total: 6.16 km^{2} (2.38 sq mi)
- Elevation: 399 m (1,309 ft)

Population (December 2020)
  - Total: 2,020
  - Density: 328/km^{2} (849/sq mi)
- Time zone: UTC+01:00 (CET)
  - Summer (DST): UTC+02:00 (CEST)
- Postal code: 8182
- SFOS number: 59
- ISO 3166 code: CH-ZH
- Surrounded by: Bülach, Glattfelden, Höri, Neerach, Stadel bei Niederglatt
- Website: www.hochfelden.ch

Hochfelden is a municipality in the district of Bülach in the canton of Zürich in Switzerland.

== History ==
Hochfelden is first mentioned in 886 as Hofelda.

== Geography ==
Aerial view (1948)

Hochfelden has an area of 6.2 km^{2} (2.4 sq mi). Of this area, 43.3% is used for agricultural purposes, while 44.9% is forested. Of the rest of the land, 8.9% is settled (buildings or roads) and the remainder (2.9%) is non-productive (rivers, glaciers or mountains).

The municipality is located near the Glatt Valley near Bülach. It consists of the village of Hochfelden and the village of Wilenhof.

== Demographics ==
Hochfelden has a population (as of 31 December 2020) of 2,020. As of 2007, 13.1% of the population was made up of foreign nationals. Over the last 10 years the population has grown at a rate of 23.3%. Most of the population (as of 2000) speaks German (88.2%), with Albanian being second most common (3.2%) and Italian being third (2.4%).

In the 2007 election, the most popular party was the SVP which received 50.9% of the vote. The next three most popular parties were the SPS (14.1%), the CSP (11.7%) and the Green Party (6.9%).

The age distribution of the population (as of 2000) is children and teenagers (0–19 years old) make up 26.9% of the population, while adults (20–64 years old) make up 65.5% and seniors (over 64 years old) make up 7.6%. In Hochfelden about 77.9% of the population (between age 25-64) have completed either non-mandatory upper secondary education or additional higher education (either university or a Fachhochschule).

Hochfelden has an unemployment rate of 2.33%. As of 2005, there were 37 people employed in the primary economic sector and about 16 businesses involved in this sector. 190 people are employed in the secondary sector and there are 18 businesses in this sector. 115 people are employed in the tertiary sector, with 36 businesses in this sector.

=== Historical population ===
The historical population is given in the following chart:
