= Winkel, Switzerland =

Winkel
- Municipality
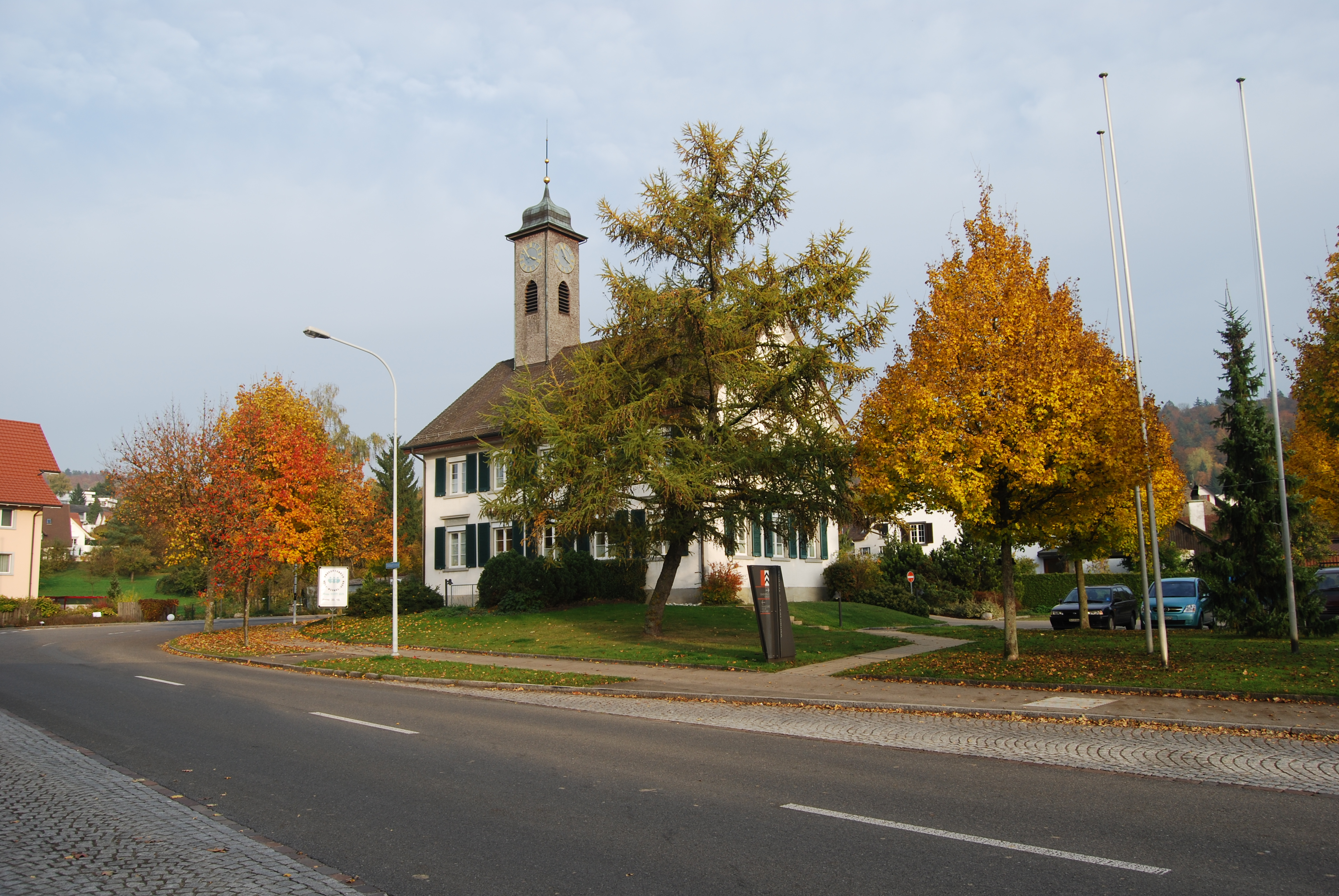

- Flag Coat of arms
- Location of Winkel
- Location within Switzerland Location within Canton of Zurich
- Coordinates: 47°30′N 8°33′E
- Country: Switzerland
- Canton: Zurich
- District: Bülach

Area
  - Total: 8.16 km^{2} (3.15 sq mi)
- Elevation: 450 m (1,480 ft)

Population (December 2020)
  - Total: 4,648
  - Density: 570/km^{2} (1,480/sq mi)
- Time zone: UTC+01:00 (CET)
  - Summer (DST): UTC+02:00 (CEST)
- Postal code: 8185
- SFOS number: 72
- ISO 3166 code: CH-ZH
- Surrounded by: Bachenbülach, Bülach, Embrach, Kloten, Lufingen, Oberglatt, Rümlang
- Website: www.winkel.ch

Winkel (German pronunciation: [ˈvɪŋkl̩]) is a municipality in the district of Bülach in the canton of Zürich in Switzerland.

== Geography ==
Aerial view (1962)

Winkel has an area of 8.1 km^{2} (3.1 sq mi). Of this area, 45.1% is used for agricultural purposes, while 27.5% is forested. Of the rest of the land, 21.1% is settled (buildings or roads) and the remainder (6.4%) is non-productive (rivers, glaciers or mountains).

== Demographics ==
Winkel has a population (as of 31 December 2020) of 4,648. As of 2007, 11.3% of the population was made up of foreign nationals. Over the last 10 years the population has grown at a rate of 23.5%. Most of the population (as of 2000) speaks German (91.2%), with French being second most common ( 1.4%) and English being third ( 1.4%).

In the 2007 election the most popular party was the SVP which received 42.6% of the vote. The next three most popular parties were the FDP (16.9%), the SPS (11.7%) and the CSP (10.4%).

The age distribution of the population (as of 2000) is children and teenagers (0–19 years old) make up 21.3% of the population, while adults (20–64 years old) make up 69.3% and seniors (over 64 years old) make up 9.3%. In Winkel about 86.8% of the population (between age 25–64) have completed either non-mandatory upper secondary education or additional higher education (either university or a Fachhochschule).

Winkel has an unemployment rate of 1.52%. As of 2005, there were 144 people employed in the primary economic sector and about 25 businesses involved in this sector. 88 people are employed in the secondary sector and there are 19 businesses in this sector. 420 people are employed in the tertiary sector, with 98 businesses in this sector.

== Education ==
Students in the primary levels go to the primarschule of Winkel. Students beyond that level attend schools in Bülach.
