= Raats =

Raats or Rääts may refer to:

- Brian Raats (born 2004), South African track and field athlete
- Jaan Rääts (1932–2020), Estonian composer

== See also ==
- Raat (disambiguation)
