= Bachenbülach =

Municipality in Zürich, Switzerland

- Municipality
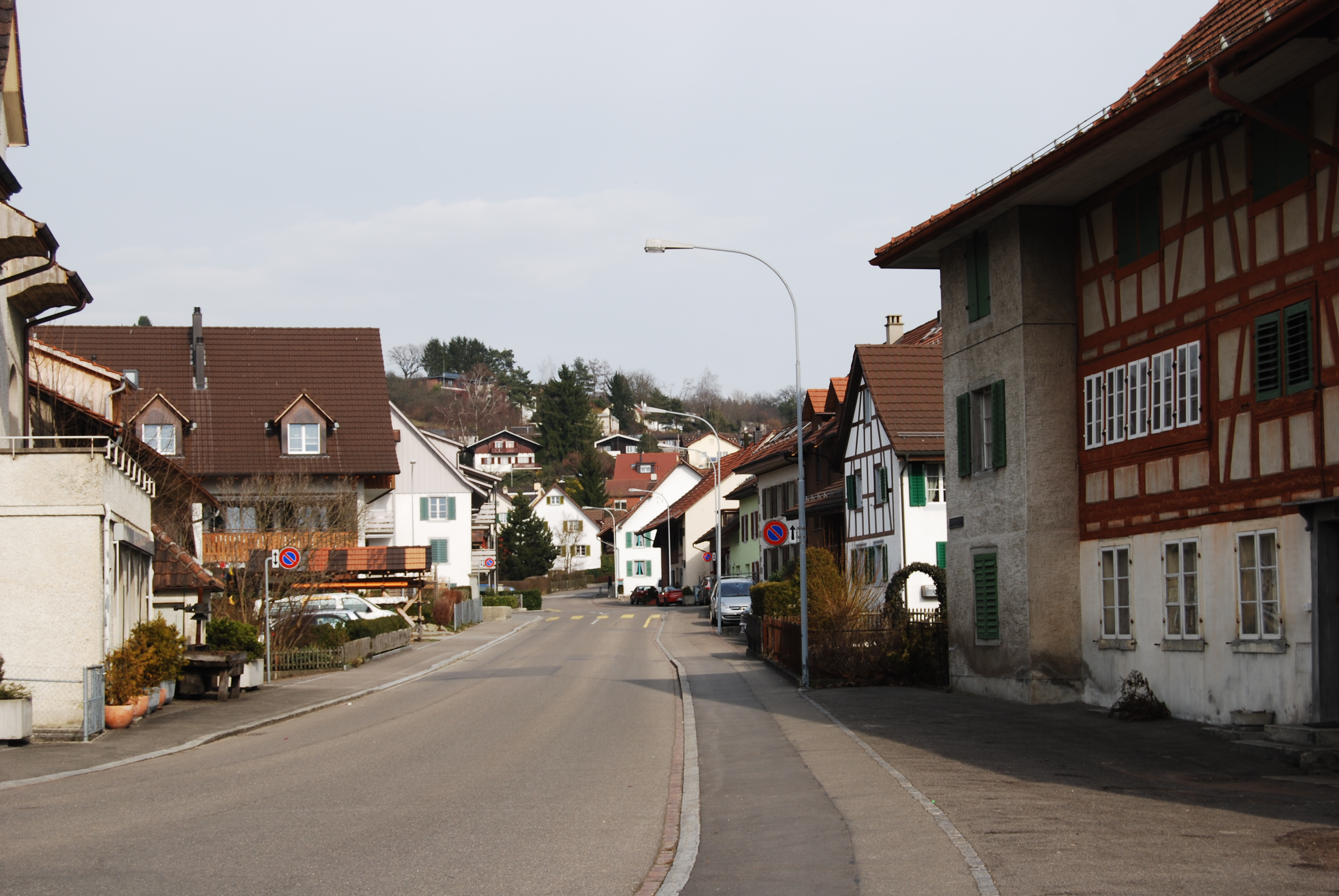

- Flag Coat of arms
- Location of Bachenbülach
- Location within Switzerland Location within Canton of Zurich
- Coordinates: 47°30′N 8°33′E
- Country: Switzerland
- Canton: Zurich
- District: Bülach

Area
  - Total: 4.25 km^{2} (1.64 sq mi)
- Elevation: 430 m (1,410 ft)

Population (December 2020)
  - Total: 4,188
  - Density: 985/km^{2} (2,550/sq mi)
- Time zone: UTC+01:00 (CET)
  - Summer (DST): UTC+02:00 (CEST)
- Postal code: 8184
- SFOS number: 51
- ISO 3166 code: CH-ZH
- Surrounded by: Bülach, Höri, Oberglatt, Winkel
- Website: www.bachenbuelach.ch

Bachenbülach is a municipality in the district of Bülach in the canton of Zürich in Switzerland.

== History ==
Bachenbülach is first mentioned in 1149 as Bahchenboulacho. But it was certainly inhabited much earlier. The ruins of a Roman farmstead have been discovered on its outskirts.

== Geography ==
Aerial view (1968)

Bachenbülach has an area of 4.3 km^{2} (1.7 sq mi). Of this area, 35.1% is used for agricultural purposes, while 41.2% is forested. Of the rest of the land, 20.8% is settled (buildings or roads) and the remainder (2.8%) is non-productive (rivers, glaciers or mountains).

The municipality is located at the foot of the Dettenberg. The town has grown along two main axes, the main road through town and a stream that runs through town.

== Demographics ==
Bachenbülach has a population (as of 31 December 2020) of 4,188. As of 2007, 23.3% of the population was made up of foreign nationals. Over the last 10 years the population has grown at a rate of 22.8%. Most of the population (as of 2000) speaks German (78.8%), with Italian being second most common ( 4.8%) and Serbo-Croatian being third ( 3.3%).

In the 2007 election the most popular party was the SVP which received 37.9% of the vote. The next three most popular parties were the SPS (17.5%), the FDP (13.3%) and the CSP (11.8%).

The age distribution of the population (as of 2000) is children and teenagers (0–19 years old) make up 21.2% of the population, while adults (20–64 years old) make up 69.2% and seniors (over 64 years old) make up 9.6%. In Bachenbülach about 67.9% of the population (between age 25-64) have completed either non-mandatory upper secondary education or additional higher education (either university or a Fachhochschule).

Bachenbülach has an unemployment rate of 2.61%. As of 2005, there were 20 people employed in the primary economic sector and about 10 businesses involved in this sector. 312 people are employed in the secondary sector and there are 37 businesses in this sector. 1125 people are employed in the tertiary sector, with 126 businesses in this sector. The historical population is given in the following table:

year	population
1665	273
1850	569
1910	535
1960	985
1970	2,307
1990	2,887
2022	4,201
