= Laboratory (disambiguation) =

Laboratory is a facility where scientific experiments are performed.

Laboratory may also refer to:

- Laboratory, North Carolina, an unincorporated community, United States
- Laboratory, Pennsylvania, an unincorporated community, United States
- Laboratory (publisher), a Ukrainian publishing house
