= Rat Island =

Rat Island may refer to:

- Ilha dos Ratos, the original name for Ilha Fiscal in Rio de Janeiro, Brasil
- Hawadax Island, Alaska, USA, formerly known as "Rat Island"
- Rat Island, New York, USA
- Rat Island (Houtman Abrolhos), an island in Western Australia
- An alternative name for Burrow Island in Portsmouth Harbour, Hampshire, England
- Motukiore, Bay of Islands, New Zealand
- Rat Island, Lundy, a small island near the south end of Lundy, Devon, England
- Rat Island: a small island west of Bengkulu (19th Century name)
- Rat Island, St Lucia, St Lucia

== See also ==
- Rat Islands
