= Niederglatt =

- Municipality
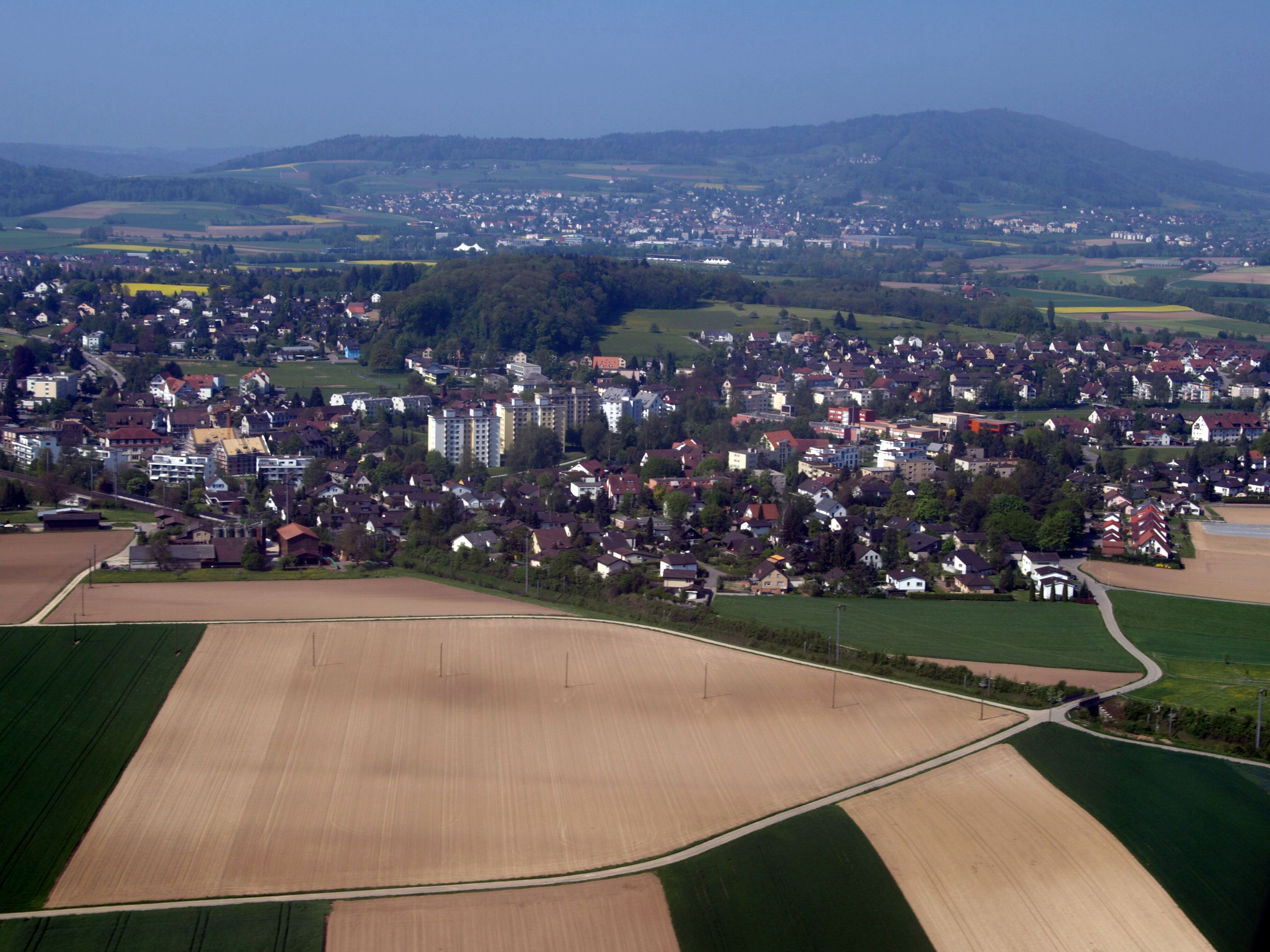

- Flag Coat of arms
- Location of Niederglatt
- Location within Switzerland Location within Canton of Zurich
- Coordinates: 47°31′N 8°30′E
- Country: Switzerland
- Canton: Zurich
- District: Dielsdorf

Area
  - Total: 3.62 km^{2} (1.40 sq mi)
- Elevation: 411 m (1,348 ft)

Population (December 2020)
  - Total: 4,938
  - Density: 1,360/km^{2} (3,530/sq mi)
- Time zone: UTC+01:00 (CET)
  - Summer (DST): UTC+02:00 (CEST)
- Postal code: 8172
- SFOS number: 89
- ISO 3166 code: CH-ZH
- Surrounded by: Höri, Neerach, Niederhasli, Oberglatt, Steinmaur
- Website: www.niederglatt.zh.ch

Niederglatt is a municipality in the district of Dielsdorf in the canton of Zürich in Switzerland.

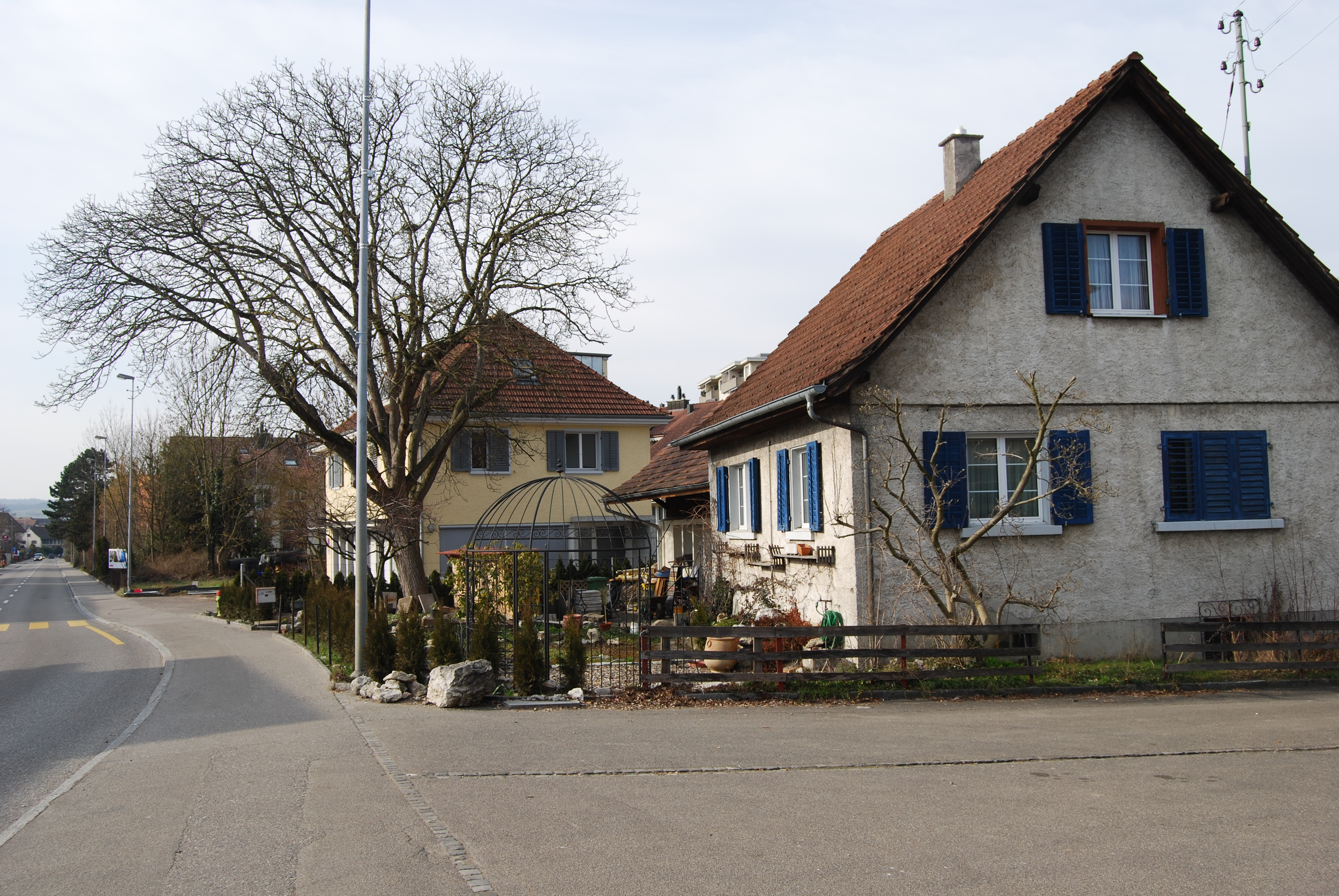
Niederglatt

== History ==
Niederglatt is first mentioned in 1149 as Niderunglatto. Between 1153 and 1155 it was mentioned as Nidrunglate. Until 1840 it was part of the municipality of Niederhasli.

== Geography ==
Niederglatt has an area of 3.6 km^{2} (1.4 sq mi). Of this area, 58.1% is used for agricultural purposes, while 6.4% is forested. Of the rest of the land, 30.8% is settled (buildings or roads) and the remainder (4.7%) is non-productive (rivers, glaciers or mountains).

The municipality is located on both banks of the Glatt river. It includes the villages of Niederglatt and Nöschikon.

Aerial view (1964)

== Demographics ==
Niederglatt has a population (as of 31 December 2020) of 4,938. As of 2007, 20.9% of the population was made up of foreign nationals. Over the last 10 years the population has grown at a rate of 26.1%. Most of the population (as of 2000) speaks German (87.9%), with Italian being second most common ( 4.7%) and Albanian being third ( 1.7%).

In the 2007 election the most popular party was the SVP which received 50% of the vote. The next three most popular parties were the SPS (12.5%), the FDP (10.8%) and the CVP (8.3%).

The age distribution of the population (as of 2000) is children and teenagers (0–19 years old) make up 23.3% of the population, while adults (20–64 years old) make up 65.1% and seniors (over 64 years old) make up 11.6%. In Niederglatt about 77.4% of the population (between age 25-64) have completed either non-mandatory upper secondary education or additional higher education (either university or a Fachhochschule).

Niederglatt has an unemployment rate of 2.58%. As of 2005, there were 62 people employed in the primary economic sector and about 16 businesses involved in this sector. 317 people are employed in the secondary sector and there are 31 businesses in this sector. 716 people are employed in the tertiary sector, with 107 businesses in this sector.

The historical population is given in the following table:

year	population
1467	9 Households
1634	229
1850	580
1900	524
1950	872
1970	2,421
2000	3,737
2010	4,570
2020	4,937

== Transport ==
Niederglatt railway station is a stop of the Zürich S-Bahn on the line S9. Its train station is a 20 minute ride from Zürich Hauptbahnhof.
