= The Rat =

The Rat may refer to:

== Arts and entertainment ==
=== Fictional characters ===
- The Rat, a petty criminal hired by Dr. Claw and the antagonist of "M.A.D Trap", season 1, episode 19 of Inspector Gadget (1983)
- The Rat, a character from Haruki Murakami's 'Trilogy of the Rat' Hear the Wind Sing, Pinball, 1973 and A Wild Sheep Chase

=== Film ===
- The Rat (1925 film), a film by Ivor Novello based on his play of the same name
- The Rat (1937 film), another film adaptation of the play

=== Literature ===
- "The Rat", a poem by Arthur Symons, appearing in Amoris Victima, in 2. Amoris Exsul, no. 4, first published in 1897
- The Rat (play), a 1924 play written by Ivor Novello and Constance Collier
- The Rat, a novelization of the play by Phyllis Bottome published in 1927
- The Rat (novel), a book by Günter Grass published in German in 1986 as Die Rättin

=== Music ===
- "The Rat" (song), a 2004 song by The Walkmen from their album Bows + Arrows
- "The Rat", a song by Dead Confederate from their album Wrecking Ball

=== Television ===
- "The Rat", Beavis and Butt-Head season 8, episode 9 (2011)
- "The Rat", Ideal series 1, episode 1 (2005)
- "The Rat", Pasadena episode 2 (2001)
- "The Rat", Prison Break season 1, episode 14 (2006)
- "The Rat", Tattooed Teenage Alien Fighters from Beverly Hills episode 13 (1994)
- "The Rat", The Great Book of Nature episode 12 (1999)
- "The Rat", The Rat season 4, episode 6 (2016)
- "The Rat", Unhappily Ever After season 2, episode 3 (1995)

== Nickname ==
- Niki Lauda (born 1949), Austrian former Formula One race car driver
- Ken Linseman (born 1958), former National Hockey League player
- Jeff Ratcliffe (born 1976), former professional lacrosse player

== Music ==
- The Rathskellar (The Rat), a now-defunct live music venue in Kenmore Square, Boston, Massachusetts
- Pro Co RAT, aka "The RAT", a distortion pedal

== See also ==
- Blek le Rat, an influential French graffiti artist
- The Rats (disambiguation)
- Rat (disambiguation)
