= Laboratory (publisher) =

Ukrainian publishing house

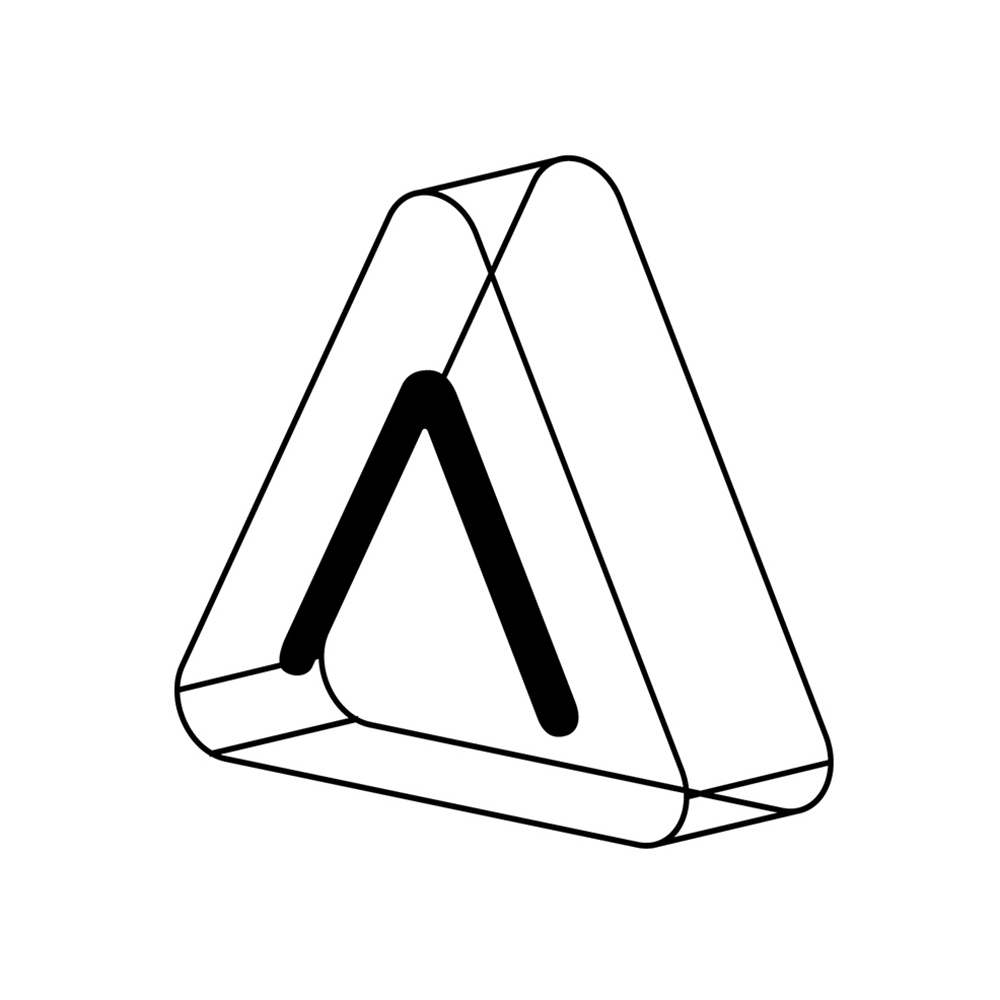
- Founded: 2020; 6 years ago
- Founder: Anton Martynov
- Headquarters: Ukraine
- Products: Books
- Website: https://laboratoria.pro/

Laboratory (Ukrainian: Лабораторія) is a Ukrainian publishing house founded in the year 2020 by Anton Martynov. It publishes fiction and nonfiction books.

== History ==
Laboratory publishing house was founded in 2020 in Kyiv by businessman and former co-owner of Nash Format publishing house Anton Martynov.

In 2020, Laboratory launched two podcasts — the Laboratory of Nonfiction and the Laboratory of Sense.

In 2022, the publishing house started to work with Ukrainian authors.

== Authors ==
- Bill Gates
- David McKean
- Vaclav Smil
- Daniel Yergin
- Vivek Murthy
- Frank Wilczek
- Katie Mack and other.

== Concept ==
Laboratory publishes western publications and works by Ukrainian authors.

It presents books in hardcover, paperback, audio and e-book.
