= Ratz =

Ratz may refer to:

- Ratz (political party), a defunct political party in Israel which merged into Meretz
- Ratz (TV series), a French-Canadian animated series from Xilam and Tooncan
- Ratz (comic strip), in The Beano
- Erwin Ratz, (1898-1973), an Austrian musicologist and music theorist
- László Rátz, Hungarian mathematics high school teacher
- Mount Ratz, a mountain in Canada
- Rätzsee, a lake in Mecklenburg-Vorpommern, Germany
- Ratz, a 2000 Showtime original film
