= Glatt Valley =

River Valley in Switzerland

Coordinates: 47°25′N 8°34′E

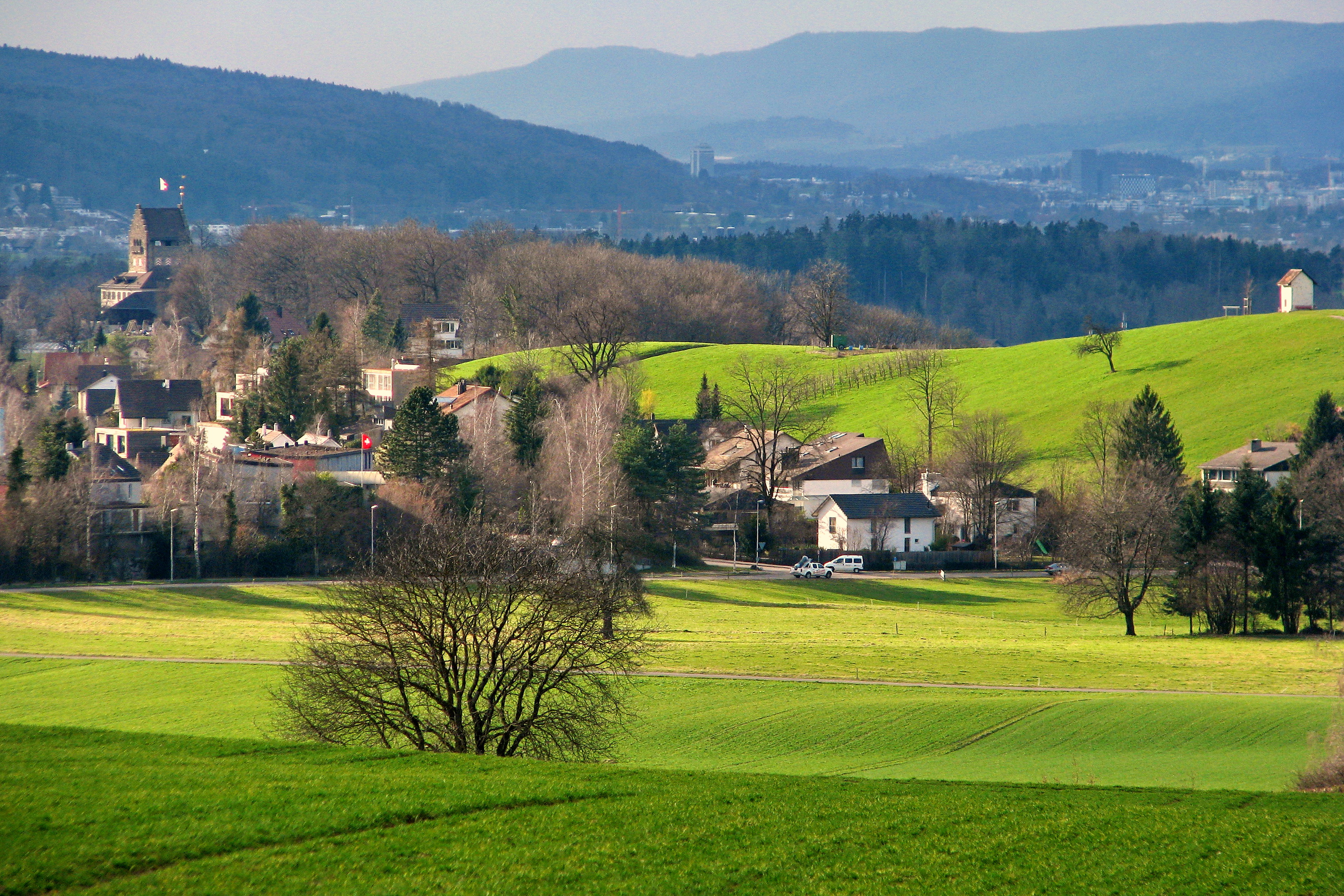
The upper Glatt Valley as seen from Uster-Nossikon (March 2010)

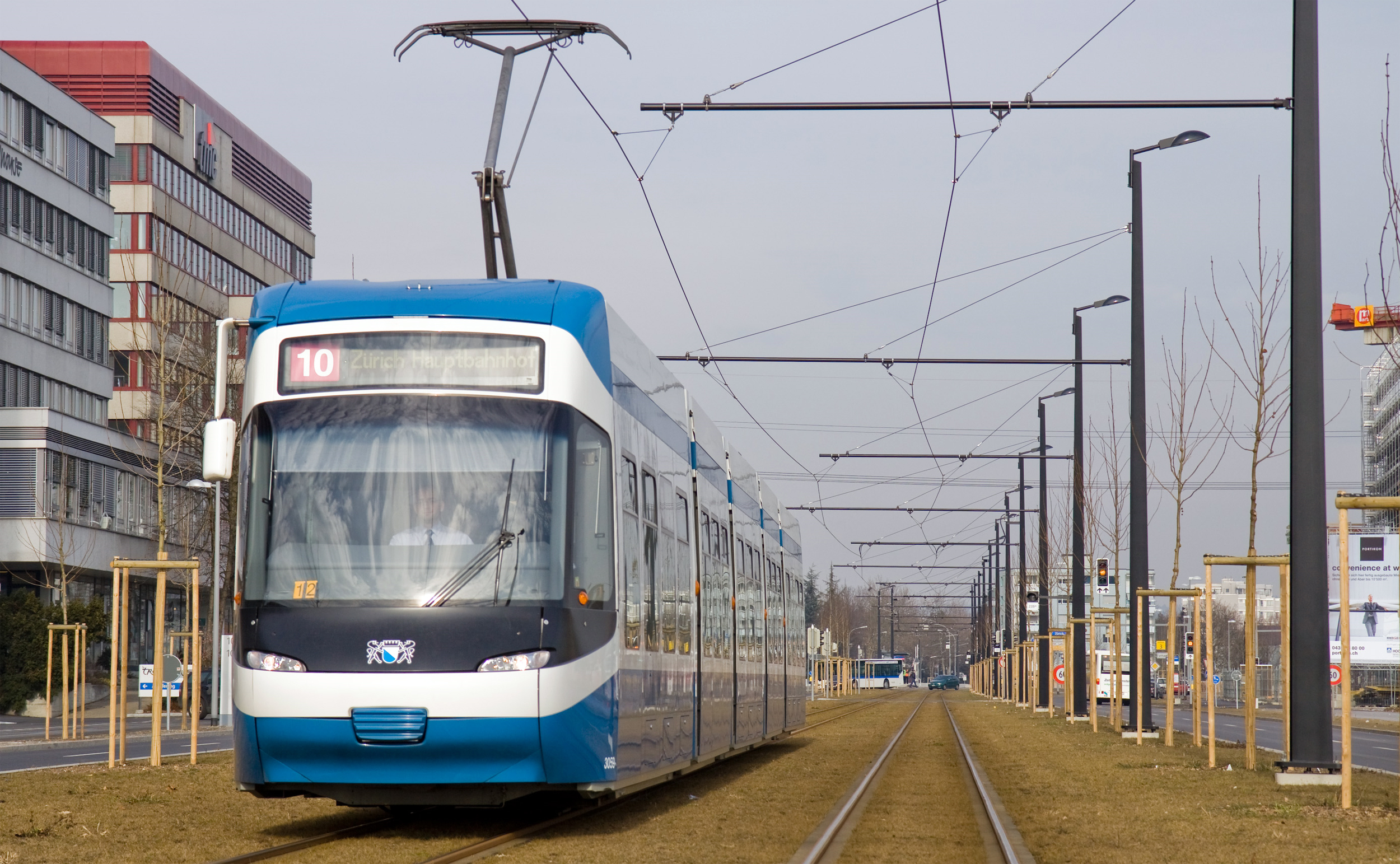
Zürich tram line 10 of the Stadtbahn Glattal near Opfikon

The Glatt Valley (German: Glattal or Glatttal) is a region and a river valley in the canton of Zürich in Switzerland.

== Geography ==
The Glatt is a tributary of the Rhine in the Zürcher Unterland area of the canton of Zurich. It is 38.5 km (23.9 mi) long and runs from the Greifensee through its river valley, discharging into the Rhine by Rheinsfelden.

The Region Glatttal comprises, among other communities in the districts of Uster, Dielsdorf and Bülach, the suburban cities and municipalities of Bassersdorf, Bülach, Dietlikon, Dübendorf, Fällanden, Glattfelden, Höri, Kloten, Oberglatt, Opfikon-Glattbrugg, Rümlang, Schwerzenbach, Wallisellen and Wangen-Brüttisellen. It also includes two districts of the city of Zürich, together known as Zürich-Nord: district 11 (Affoltern, Oerlikon and Seebach) and district 12 (Hirzenbach, Saatlen and Schwamendingen Mitte).

== Economics and transport ==
Thanks to its excellent location including infrastructure, a growing economy and attractive residential areas, the Glattal is densely populated. Hosting the most important airport between Milan and Munich increases both the attractiveness and the noise for residents. One of the biggest Glattal building projects for mostly residential space of the last decade has been Glattpark. In Zürich Oerlikon, Seebach and Affoltern, the urban residential neighbourhood Neu-Oerlikon was built. The society glow Glattal, operated by the municipalities, is intended to enhance networking of the region and to common projects.

The Glatt Valley has excellent transport links: Zurich Airport in Kloten, SBB-CFF-FFS (InterRegio and InterCity) lines serving Zurich Oerlikon and Zurich Airport railway stations which are among the 15 most frequented railway stations in Switzerland, additionally to commuter railway lines S2, S3, S5, S6, S7, S8, S9, S14, S15 and S16. The tramway lines of Stadtbahn Glattal are a rapid-transit system integrated with the tramway system of the city of Zurich. Verkehrsbetriebe Zürich (VBZ) and Verkehrsbetriebe Glattal (VBG) provide additional bus services.
