= Oberglatt =

- Municipality
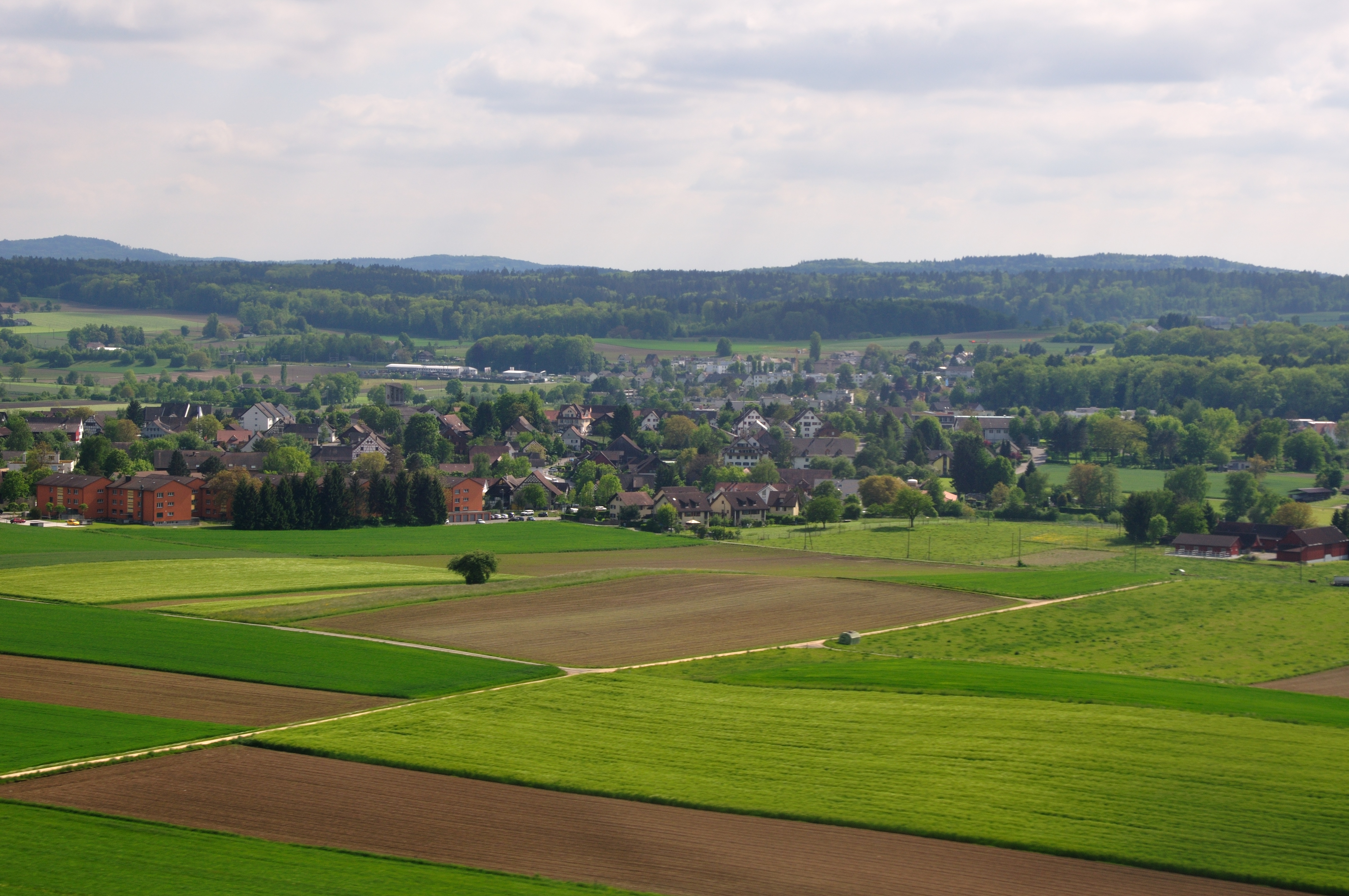

- Flag Coat of arms
- Location of Oberglatt
- Location within Switzerland Location within Canton of Zurich
- Coordinates: 47°29′N 8°31′E
- Country: Switzerland
- Canton: Zurich
- District: Dielsdorf

Area
  - Total: 8.29 km^{2} (3.20 sq mi)
- Elevation: 431 m (1,414 ft)

Population (December 2020)
  - Total: 7,386
  - Density: 891/km^{2} (2,310/sq mi)
- Time zone: UTC+01:00 (CET)
  - Summer (DST): UTC+02:00 (CEST)
- Postal code: 8154
- SFOS number: 92
- ISO 3166 code: CH-ZH
- Surrounded by: Bachenbülach, Höri, Niederglatt, Niederhasli, Rümlang, Winkel
- Website: www.oberglatt.ch

Oberglatt is a municipality in the district of Dielsdorf in the canton of Zürich in Switzerland, and belongs to the Glatt Valley (German: Glatttal). Zurich Airport is partially in Oberglatt.

== History ==
Oberglatt is first mentioned around 1153-55 as Obrunglate. Oberglatt suffered a serious fire in 1670, which destroyed twelve houses. Fifteen houses were burnt down in 1825.

In recent decades, the municipality has seen a great deal of building activity. Among other things, an actual railroad station quarter was built. Oberglatt was connected to the Zurich-Bülach railroad line in 1877. The village has long since ceased to be a predominantly farming village, as many of its residents work outside the town. The municipality is also home to a considerable number of commercial and service businesses.

Aerial view (1959)

== Geography ==
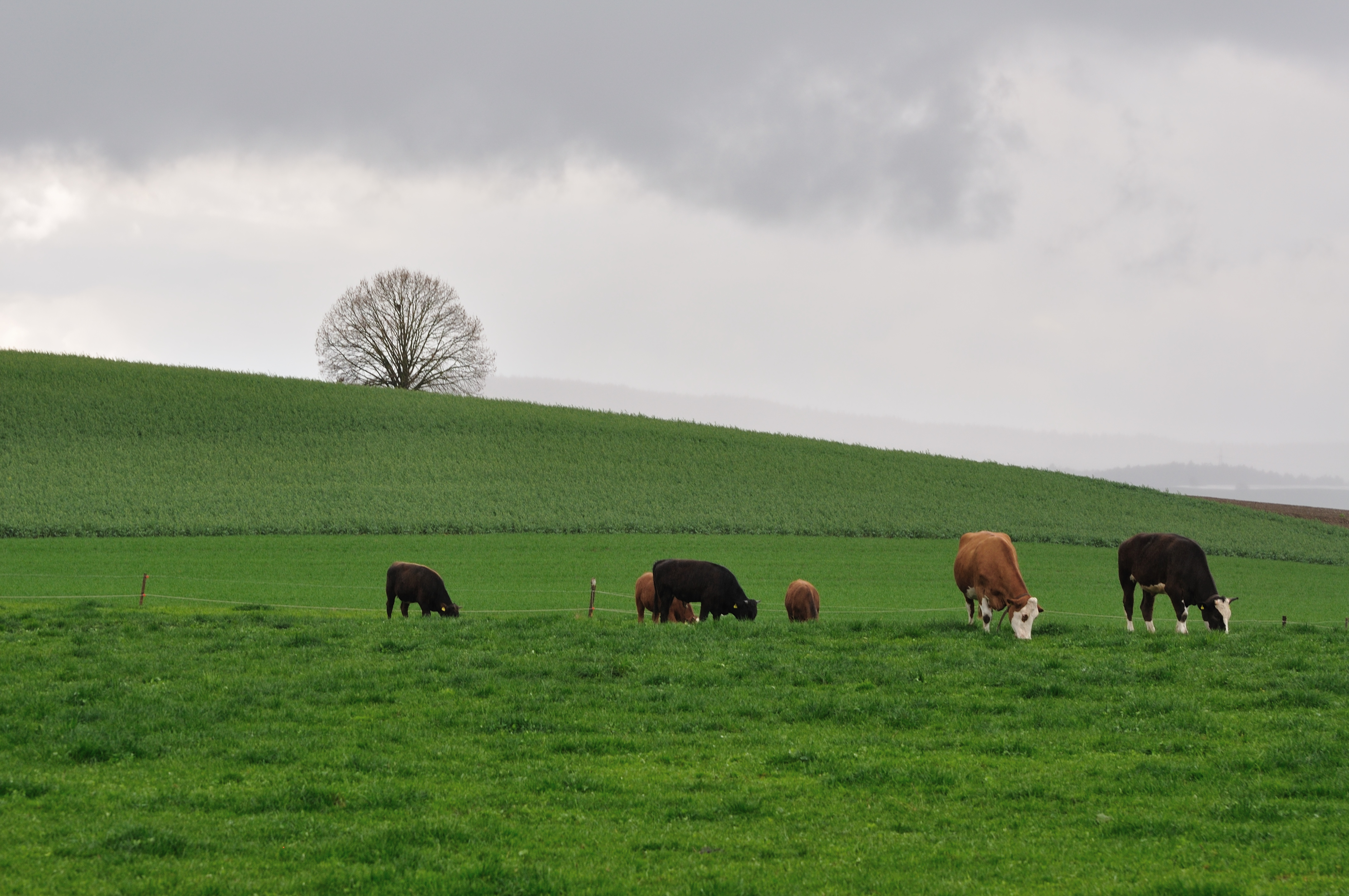
Oberglatt landscape

Oberglatt has an area of 8.2 km^{2} (3.2 sq mi). Of this area, 51.5% is used for agricultural purposes, while 10.4% is forested. Of the rest of the land, 30.7% is settled (buildings or roads) and the remainder (7.3%) is non-productive (rivers, glaciers or mountains).

The municipality straddles the Glatt river and includes the village of Oberglatt and the village section of Hofstetten. The eastern border of the municipality is the Zurich Airport.

== Demographics ==
Oberglatt has a population (as of 31 December 2020) of 7,386. As of 2007, 32.7% of the population was made up of foreign nationals. Over the last 10 years the population has grown at a rate of 16.8%. Most of the population (as of 2000) speaks German (78.6%), with Italian being second most common (5.3%) and Albanian being third (3.8%).

In the 2007 election, the most popular party was the SVP which received 46.6% of the vote. The next three most popular parties were the SPS (16.2%), the FDP (11.1%) and the CSP (7.9%).

The age distribution of the population (as of 2000) is children and teenagers (0–19 years old) makeup 24% of the population, while adults (20–64 years old) make up 68.8% and seniors (over 64 years old) make up 7.2%. In Oberglatt about 71.1% of the population (between age 25-64) have completed either non-mandatory upper secondary education or additional higher education (either university or a Fachhochschule).

Oberglatt has an unemployment rate of 3.39%. As of 2005, there were 63 people employed in the primary economic sector and about 19 businesses involved in this sector. 654 people are employed in the secondary sector and there are 57 businesses in this sector. 544 people are employed in the tertiary sector, with 120 businesses in this sector.

The historical population is given in the following table:

Year	Population
1467	30 households
1634	274
1790	490
1850	750
1900	676
1950	1,232
1970	2,770
2000	5,120
2010	5,862
2020	7,361
2023	7,467

== Business ==
It is the home of the Swiss office of the New Life Network.

== Transport ==
Oberglatt is served by Oberglatt railway station on Zürich S-Bahn lines S9 and S15. It is a 17-minute ride from Zürich Hauptbahnhof.

== Education ==
The Primarschule Oberglatt system serves students at the kindergarten and primary levels. The primary school campus consists of four buildings. Three additional buildings house kindergarten students.

Two secondary schools serve Oberglatt students; Sekundarschule Rümlang-Oberglatt in Rümlang, and Sekundarschule Niederhasli-Niederglatt-Hofstetten in Niederhasli.

The Stiftung Tagesschule Oberglatt is in the city.
