= Rat River =

Rat River may refer to:

== Canada ==
- Rat River (Burntwood River tributary), Manitoba
- Rat River (Red River of the North tributary), Manitoba
- Rivière au Rat (Weedon), a tributary of the Saint-François River in Quebec, Canada
- Rivière aux Rats, a tributary of the Saguenay River in Quebec, Canada

== Romania ==
- Rât (disambiguation), several rivers

== Elsewhere ==
- River Rat, a tributary of the River Gipping, England
- Rat River, Wisconsin, the former name of Silver Cliff, Wisconsin, US
