= Rat, Novi Travnik =

Rat
- Village
- Location within Bosnia and Herzegovina
- Coordinates: 44.0456476°N 17.6841492°E
- Country: Bosnia and Herzegovina
- Entity: Federation of Bosnia and Herzegovina
- Canton: Central Bosnia
- Municipality: Novi Travnik

Area
  - Total: 2.86 sq mi (7.42 km^{2})

Population (2013)
  - Total: 287
  - Density: 100/sq mi (38.7/km^{2})
- Time zone: UTC+1 (CET)
  - Summer (DST): UTC+2 (CEST)

Rat is a village in the municipality of Novi Travnik, Bosnia and Herzegovina.

== Demographics ==
According to the 2013 census, its population was 287.

Ethnicity in 2013
Ethnicity	Number	Percentage
Bosniaks	270	94.1%
Croats	16	5.6%
Serbs	1	0.3%
Total	287	100%
