= Rümlang =

- Municipality
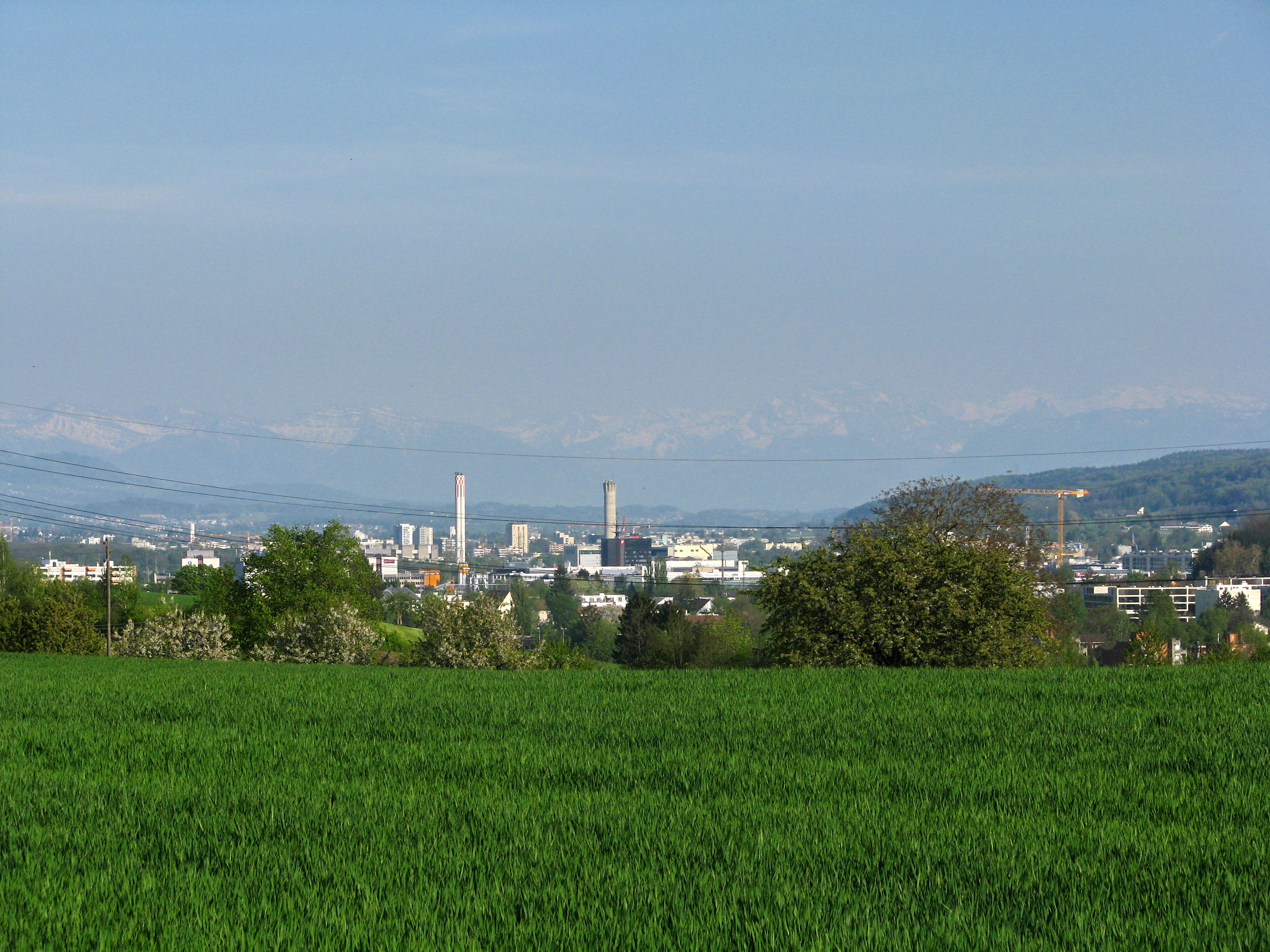

- Flag Coat of arms
- Location of Rümlang
- Location within Switzerland Location within Canton of Zurich
- Coordinates: 47°27′N 8°32′E
- Country: Switzerland
- Canton: Zurich
- District: Dielsdorf

Area
  - Total: 12.39 km^{2} (4.78 sq mi)
- Elevation: 443 m (1,453 ft)

Population (December 2020)
  - Total: 8,277
  - Density: 668.0/km^{2} (1,730/sq mi)
- Time zone: UTC+01:00 (CET)
  - Summer (DST): UTC+02:00 (CEST)
- Postal code: 8153
- SFOS number: 97
- ISO 3166 code: CH-ZH
- Surrounded by: Kloten, Niederhasli, Oberglatt, Opfikon, Regensdorf, Winkel, Zurich
- Website: www.ruemlang.ch

Rümlang is a municipality in the district of Dielsdorf in the canton of Zürich in Switzerland, and belongs to the Glatt Valley (German: Glattal). Zurich Airport is partially located in Rümlang.

== Geography ==
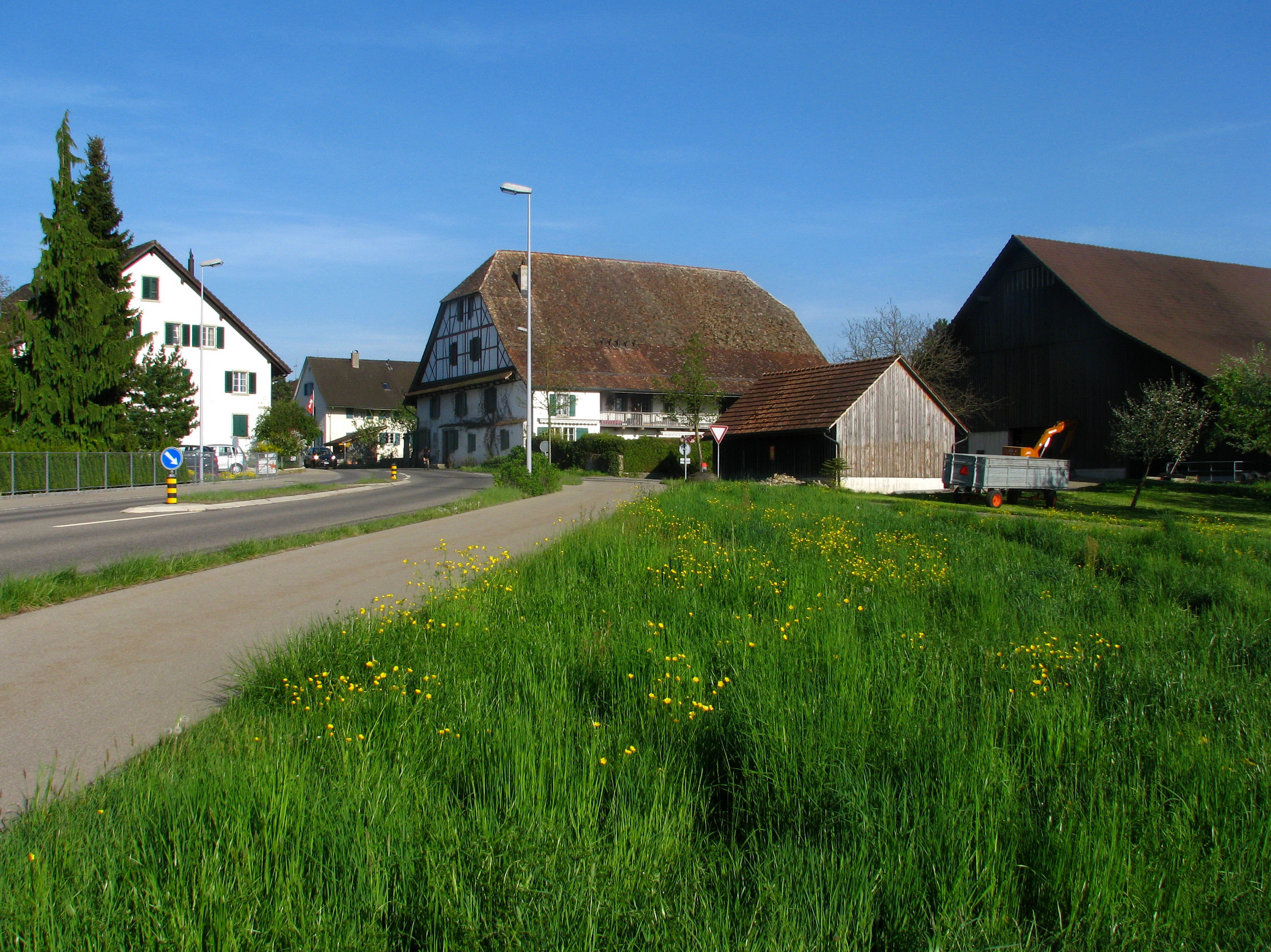
Katzenrüti in Rümlang

Aerial view from 300 m by Walter Mittelholzer (1925)

Rümlang has an area of 12.5 km^{2} (4.8 sq mi). Of this area, 51.6% is used for agricultural purposes, while 22.8% is forested. Of the rest of the land, 23.9% is settled (buildings or roads) and the remainder (1.7%) is non-productive (rivers, glaciers or mountains).

== Demographics ==
Rümlang has a population (as of 31 December 2020) of 8,277. As of 2007, 25.2% of the population was made up of foreign nationals. Over the last 10 years the population has grown at a rate of 16.3%. Most of the population (as of 2000) speaks German (83.5%), with Italian being second most common (4.7%) and Albanian being third (2.1%).

In the 2019 Swiss federal election, the most popular party was the SVP which received 41.6% of the vote. The next four most popular parties were the SPS (19.8%), the GLP (9.9%), the FDP (8.7%) and the GPS (6.3%).

The age distribution of the population (as of 2000) is children and teenagers (0–19 years old) make up 20.9% of the population, while adults (20–64 years old) make up 64.7% and seniors (over 64 years old) make up 14.4%. In Rümlang about 73.8% of the population (between age 25-64) have completed either non-mandatory upper secondary education or additional higher education (either university or a Fachhochschule).

Rümlang has an unemployment rate of 3.18%. As of 2005, there were 150 people employed in the primary economic sector and about 34 businesses involved in this sector. 1446 people are employed in the secondary sector and there are 133 businesses in this sector. 3329 people are employed in the tertiary sector, with 368 businesses in this sector.

== Transportation ==
Rümlang is served by Rümlang railway station on Zürich S-Bahn lines S9 and S15. It is a 14 minute ride from Zürich Hauptbahnhof.

== Education and Economy ==
The commune has two Primarschulen. The Sekundarschule Rümlang-Oberglatt serves secondary level students.

The Musikschule Bülach in Bülach serves the commune.

Rümlang is home to the headquarters of the globally active Dormakaba Group. Ticketcorner is based in the Riedmatt industrial estate. With 85 employees, this service company is one of the largest taxpayers in the municipality. There is a branch of Gilgen Logistics in Rümlang. Larger employers with a national presence and headquarters in Rümlang include Bosshard + Co (paint, varnishes, glazes), Fröhlich Transklima AG (service transport refrigeration systems) and the Swiss headquarters of the American car rental company Avis. Swiss Post opened a parcel center in 2022.
