= The Rats =

The Rats may refer to:

- The Rats (American band), a garage punk band from Portland, Oregon
- The Rats (British band), a rock band from Hull, England
- The Rats (2002 film), a television film
- The Rats (novel), a horror novel by James Herbert
  - The Rats (video game), a text adventure survival game based on the novel
  - Deadly Eyes, a Canadian film adaptation (released as The Rats in the United Kingdom)
- The Rats, the fictional backing group of Curt Wild in Velvet Goldmine
- The Rats, the 2009 revival of the Boomtown Rats
- A short story in the Argentine anthology film Wild Tales (film)
- The Rats (play), a five-act stage drama by Nobel laureate Gerhart Hauptmann

== See also ==
- The Rat (disambiguation)
- Rat (disambiguation)
- Las ratas (disambiguation)
