= Neerach =

- Municipality
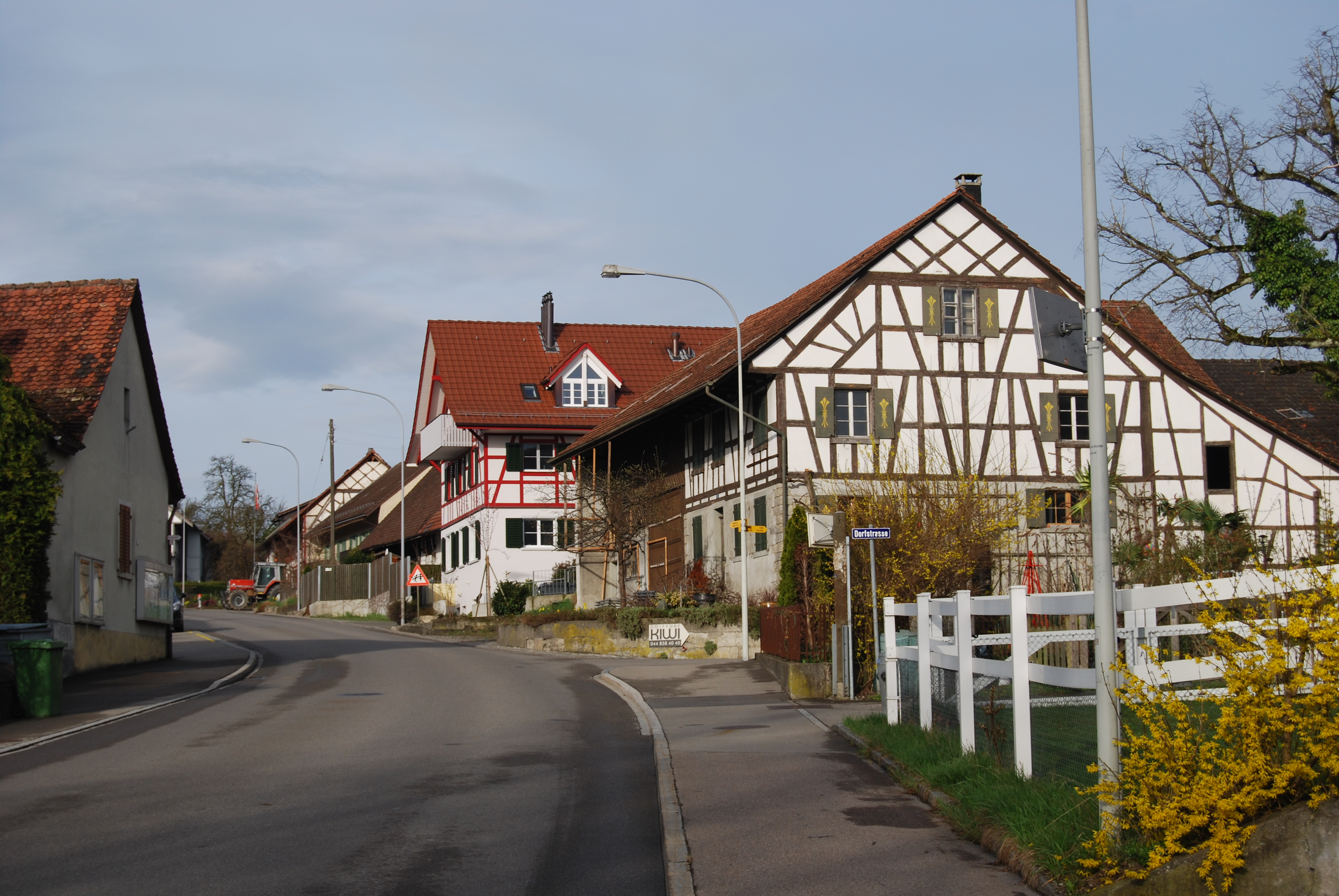

- Flag Coat of arms
- Location of Neerach
- Location within Switzerland Location within Canton of Zurich
- Coordinates: 47°31′N 8°28′E
- Country: Switzerland
- Canton: Zurich
- District: Dielsdorf

Area
  - Total: 6.01 km^{2} (2.32 sq mi)
- Elevation: 449 m (1,473 ft)

Population (December 2020)
  - Total: 3,229
  - Density: 537/km^{2} (1,390/sq mi)
- Time zone: UTC+01:00 (CET)
  - Summer (DST): UTC+02:00 (CEST)
- Postal code: 8173
- SFOS number: 88
- ISO 3166 code: CH-ZH
- Surrounded by: Bachs, Hochfelden, Höri, Niederglatt, Stadel bei Niederglatt, Steinmaur
- Twin towns: Präz (Switzerland)
- Website: www.neerach.ch

Neerach is a municipality in the district of Dielsdorf in the canton of Zürich in Switzerland.

== History ==
Neerach is first mentioned between 1160 and 1169 as Neracho. In 1149, Ried was mentioned as Riete.

Aerial view (1950)

== Geography ==
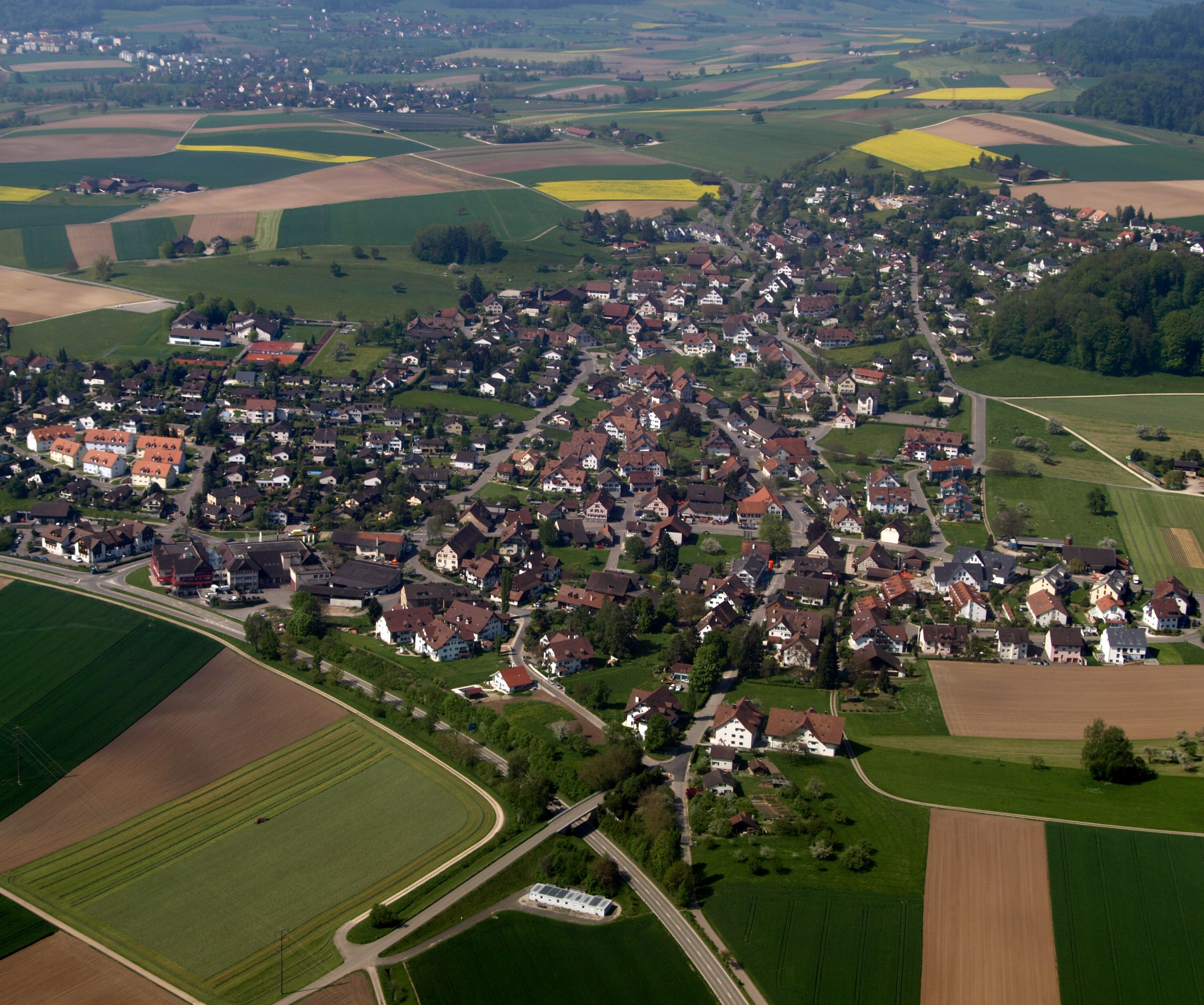
Aerial view of Neerach

Neerach has an area of 6 km^{2} (2.3 sq mi). Of this area, 64.2% is used for agricultural purposes, while 5.7% is forested. Of the rest of the land, 17.7% is settled (buildings or roads) and the remainder (12.5%) is non-productive (rivers, glaciers or mountains).

The municipality is composed of the two villages of Neerach and Ried.

== Demographics ==
Neerach has a population (as of 31 December 2020) of 3,229. As of 2007, 9.4% of the population was made up of foreign nationals. Over the last 10 years the population has grown at a rate of 30.2%. Most of the population (as of 2000) speaks German (92.9%), with French being second most common (1.6%) and English being third (1.6%).

In the 2007 election, the most popular party was the SVP which received 51.5% of the vote. The next three most popular parties were the FDP (13.1%), the SPS (9.6%) and the CSP (9.4%).

The age distribution of the population (as of 2000) is as follows: children and teenagers (0–19 years old) make up 21% of the population, while adults (20–64 years old) make up 70% and seniors (over 64 years old) make up 9%. In Neerach about 86.7% of the population (between age 25–64) have completed either non-mandatory upper secondary education or additional higher education (either university or a Fachhochschule).

Neerach has an unemployment rate of 1.34%. As of 2005, there were 63 people employed in the primary economic sector and about 23 businesses involved in this sector. 111 people are employed in the secondary sector and there are 29 businesses in this sector. 310 people are employed in the tertiary sector, with 112 businesses in this sector.

The historical population is given in the following table:

year	population
1467	14 Households
1634	382
1689	568
1791	483
1850	784
1900	555
1950	543
1970	718
2000	2,366
