= Rât =

Rât may refer to one of the following rivers in Romania:

- Rât, tributary of the Canalul Morilor in Arad County
- Rât (Ier), tributary of the Ier in Bihor County
- Rât (Mureș), tributary of the Mureș in Alba County

== See also ==
- Rat River (disambiguation)
