= Las ratas (novel) =

1962 novel by Miguel Delibes

- Author: Miguel Delibes
- Language: Spanish
- Genre: Novel
- Publisher: Ediciones Destino
- Publication date: January 1962
- Publication place: Spain
- Media type: Print (hardback and paperback)
- Pages: 192 (first edition, hardback)

Las ratas (The Rats) is a novel by Spanish author Miguel Delibes, who was one of the leading figures of post-Civil War Spanish literature. Published in 1962, it won the Premio de la crítica (Critics Prize). The work, a social denunciation of agrarian exploitation, describes life in a small isolated Castilian village, along with the wretched existence of its inhabitants.

The novel was adapted to a film in 1997.

== Summary ==
The novel's protagonist is El Nini, an eleven-year-old boy. He lives alone with his father, Tío Ratero (Uncle Ratter - so called because he hunts water rats for food), in a cave far from the village. El Nini is a savant to whom all come for advice about the harvest, the weather, animals and saints. His mother - step-sister to his father - was committed to a psychiatric hospital when El Nini was very young, and the boy's only emotional support now resides in the company of his dog and in his love and knowledge of the surrounding countryside. Under pressure from the civil Governor, the mayor of the village wants to put an end to the caves, but Uncle Ratter refuses to leave the only dwelling he has ever known. A poacher preys on all the animals in his path, while El Nini tries to save their offspring and mitigate the damage. But tragedy comes when a young man from a nearby village starts hunting rats for fun in the same territory as Uncle Ratter, and prey becomes scarce.
