= Rat Lake (Aitkin County, Minnesota) =

Lake in the state of Minnesota, United States

- Location within Minnesota
- Location: Aitkin County, Minnesota
- Coordinates: 46°43′9″N 93°20′52″W
- Type: lake

Rat Lake is a lake in Aitkin County, Minnesota, in the United States.

The Lake was so named for the local muskrat population.

== See also ==
- List of lakes in Minnesota
