= RAT test =

RAT test may refer to:

- Rapid antigen test
- Remote Associates Test

== See also ==
- Laboratory rat
