= Stadel bei Niederglatt =

- Municipality
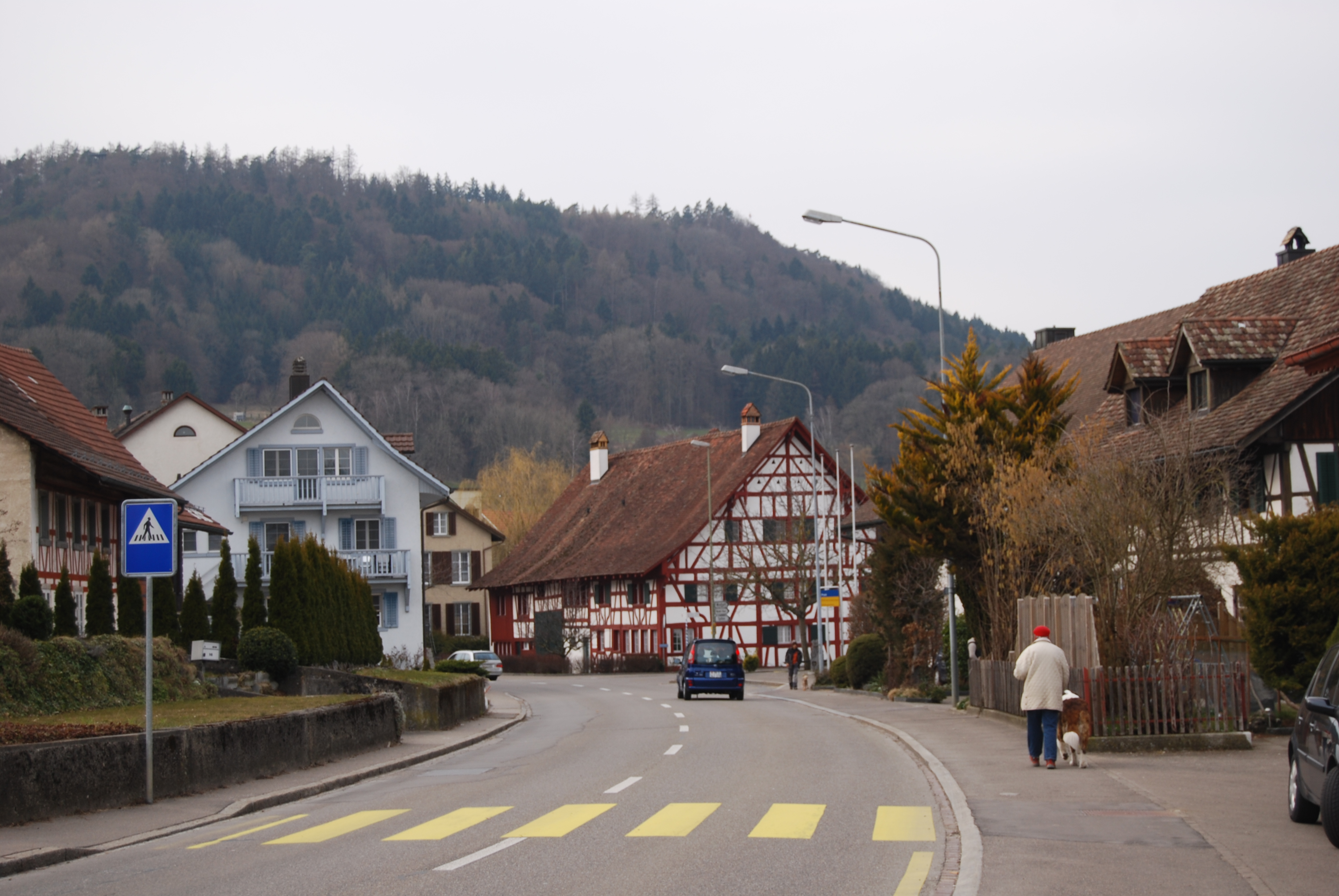

- Flag Coat of arms
- Location of Stadel bei Niederglatt
- Location within Switzerland Location within Canton of Zurich
- Coordinates: 47°32′N 8°28′E
- Country: Switzerland
- Canton: Zurich
- District: Dielsdorf

Government
  - Mayor: Peter Bernhard

Area
  - Total: 12.85 km^{2} (4.96 sq mi)
- Elevation: 436 m (1,430 ft)

Population (December 2020)
  - Total: 2,336
  - Density: 181.8/km^{2} (470.8/sq mi)
- Time zone: UTC+01:00 (CET)
  - Summer (DST): UTC+02:00 (CEST)
- Postal code: 8174
- SFOS number: 100
- ISO 3166 code: CH-ZH
- Localities: Stadel, Windlach, Raat, Schüpfheim
- Surrounded by: Glattfelden, Hochfelden, Neerach, Bachs, Weiach
- Website: www.stadel.zh.ch

Stadel is a municipality in the district of Dielsdorf in the canton of Zürich in Switzerland.

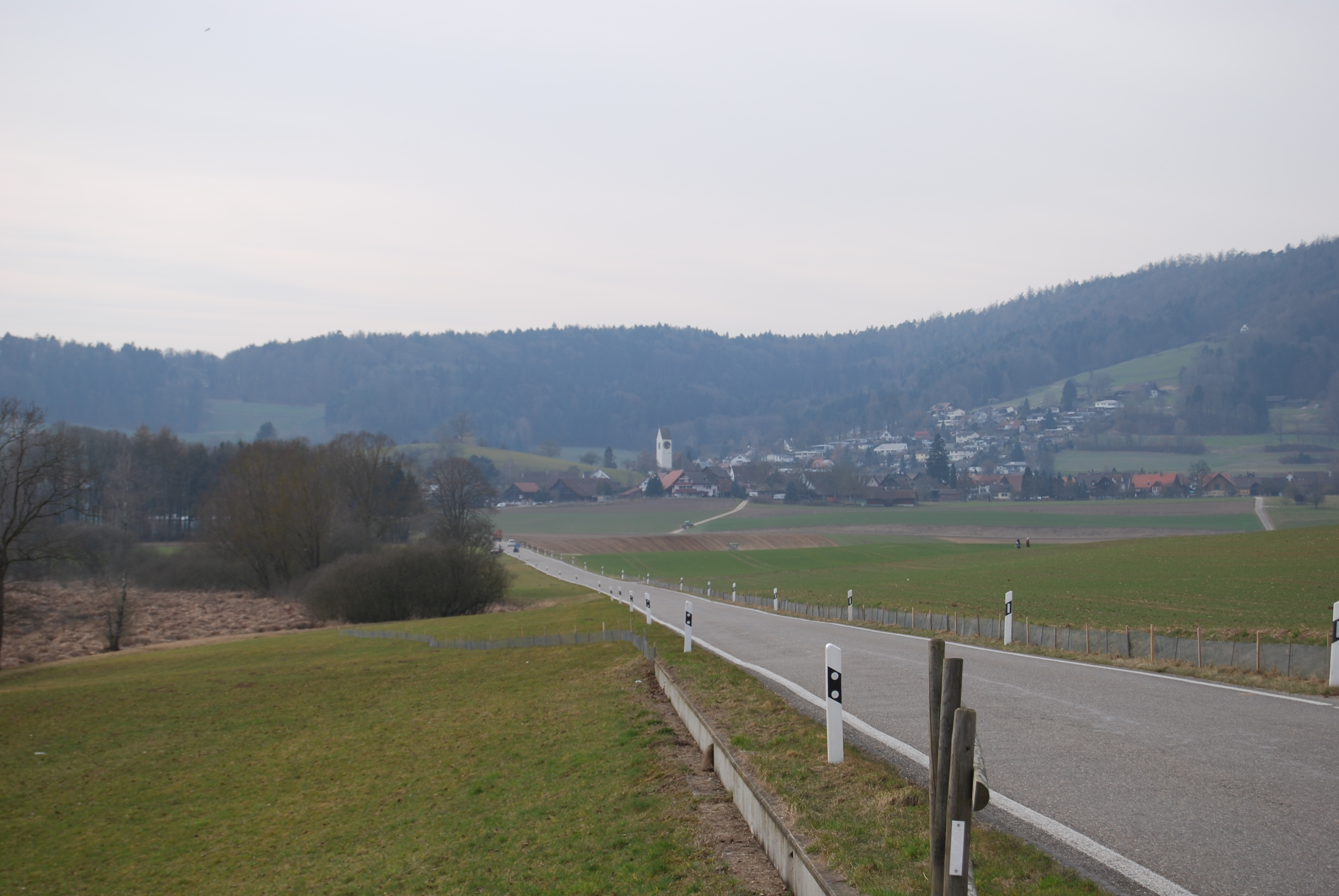
Stadel

== Geography ==
Stadel has an area of 12.9 km^{2} (5.0 sq mi). Of this area, 58.8% is used for agricultural purposes, while 30.4% is forested. Of the rest of the land, 10.2% is settled (buildings or roads) and the remainder (0.5%) is non-productive (rivers, glaciers or mountains).

To distinguish between several places having the same name, this one is suffixed by the addition of bei Niederglatt (German: near Niederglatt). Besides the village of Stadel the municipality comprises the three hamlets Windlach, Raat, and Schüpfheim.

Aerial view (1948)

== Demographics ==
Stadel has a population (as of 31 December 2020) of 2,336. As of 2007, 10.5% of the population was made up of foreign nationals. Over the last ten years the population has grown at a rate of 21.8%. Most of the population (as of 2000) speaks German (93.7%), with English being second most common ( 1.2%) and French being third ( 0.6%).

In the 2007 election the most popular party was the SVP which received 54.2% of the vote. The next three most popular parties were the CSP (9.2%), the SPS (8.6%) and the FDP (8.4%).

The age distribution of the population (as of 2000) is children and teenagers (0–19 years old) make up 23.1% of the population, while adults (20–64 years old) make up 63% and seniors (over 64 years old) make up 14%. In Stadel about 80.3% of the population (between age 25–64) have completed either non-mandatory upper secondary education or additional higher education (either university or a Fachhochschule).

Stadel has an unemployment rate of 1.52%. As of 2005, there were 132 people employed in the primary economic sector and about 44 businesses involved in this sector. 80 people are employed in the secondary sector and there are 25 businesses in this sector. 253 people are employed in the tertiary sector, with 43 businesses in this sector.
