= Rat Lake (Cottonwood County, Minnesota) =

Lake in the state of Minnesota, United States

- Location within Minnesota
- Location: Cottonwood County, Minnesota
- Coordinates: 43°58′18″N 95°4′33″W
- Type: lake

Rat Lake is a lake in Cottonwood County, in the U.S. state of Minnesota.

Rat Lake was named for the abundance of muskrats in the area.

== See also ==
- List of lakes in Minnesota
