= Glattfelden =

- Municipality
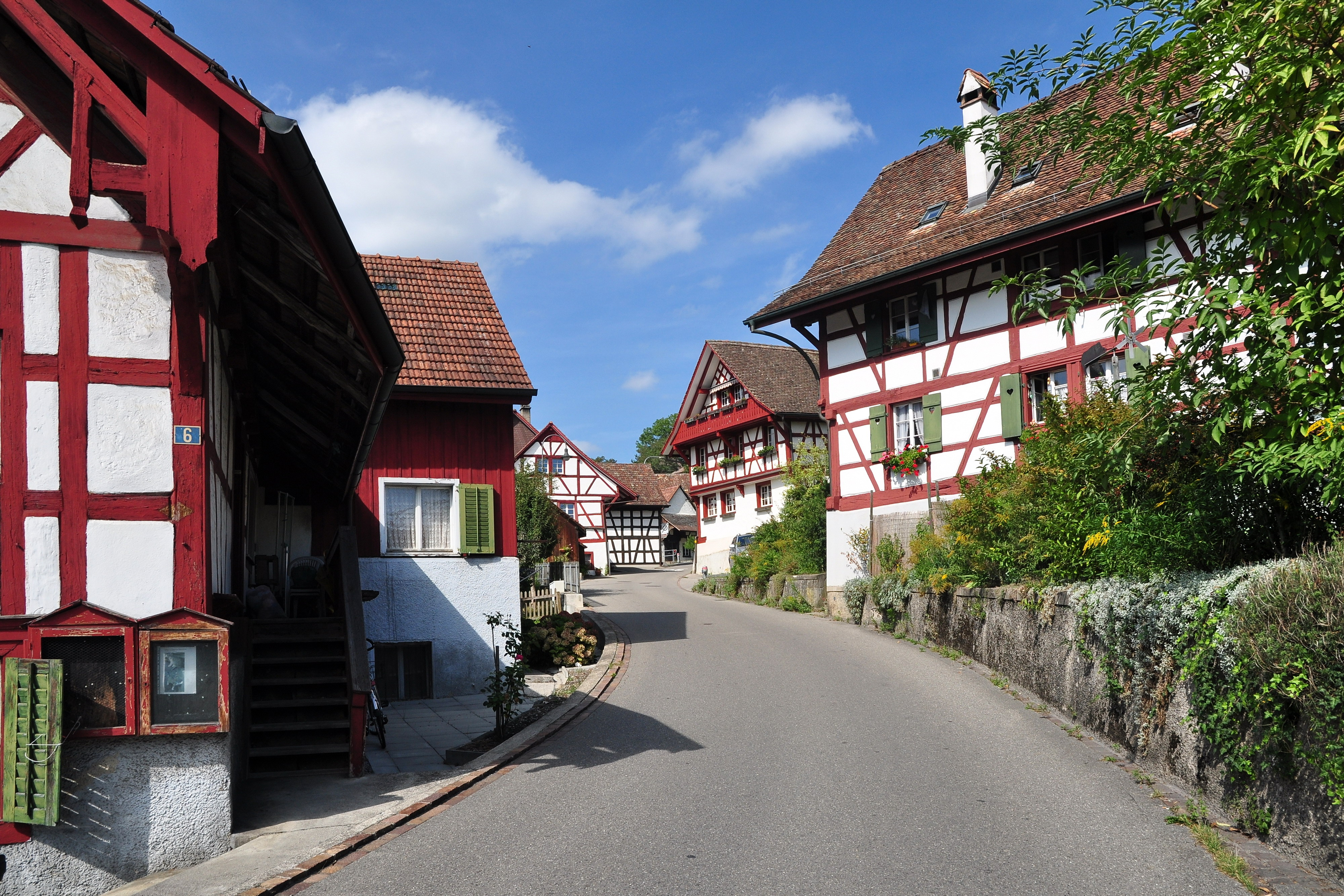

- Flag Coat of arms
- Location of Glattfelden
- Location within Switzerland Location within Canton of Zurich
- Coordinates: 47°34′N 8°30′E
- Country: Switzerland
- Canton: Zurich
- District: Bülach

Area
  - Total: 12.35 km^{2} (4.77 sq mi)
- Elevation: 387 m (1,270 ft)

Population (December 2020)
  - Total: 5,266
  - Density: 426.4/km^{2} (1,104/sq mi)
- Time zone: UTC+01:00 (CET)
  - Summer (DST): UTC+02:00 (CEST)
- Postal code: 8192
- SFOS number: 58
- ISO 3166 code: CH-ZH
- Surrounded by: Bülach, Eglisau, Hochfelden, Hohentengen am Hochrhein (DE-BW), Hüntwangen, Stadel bei Niederglatt, Weiach
- Website: www.glattfelden.ch

Glattfelden is a municipality in the district of Bülach in the canton of Zürich in Switzerland, and belongs to the Glatt Valley (German: Glattal).

== History ==
Glattfelden is first mentioned in 1130 as Glatevelden.

== Geography ==
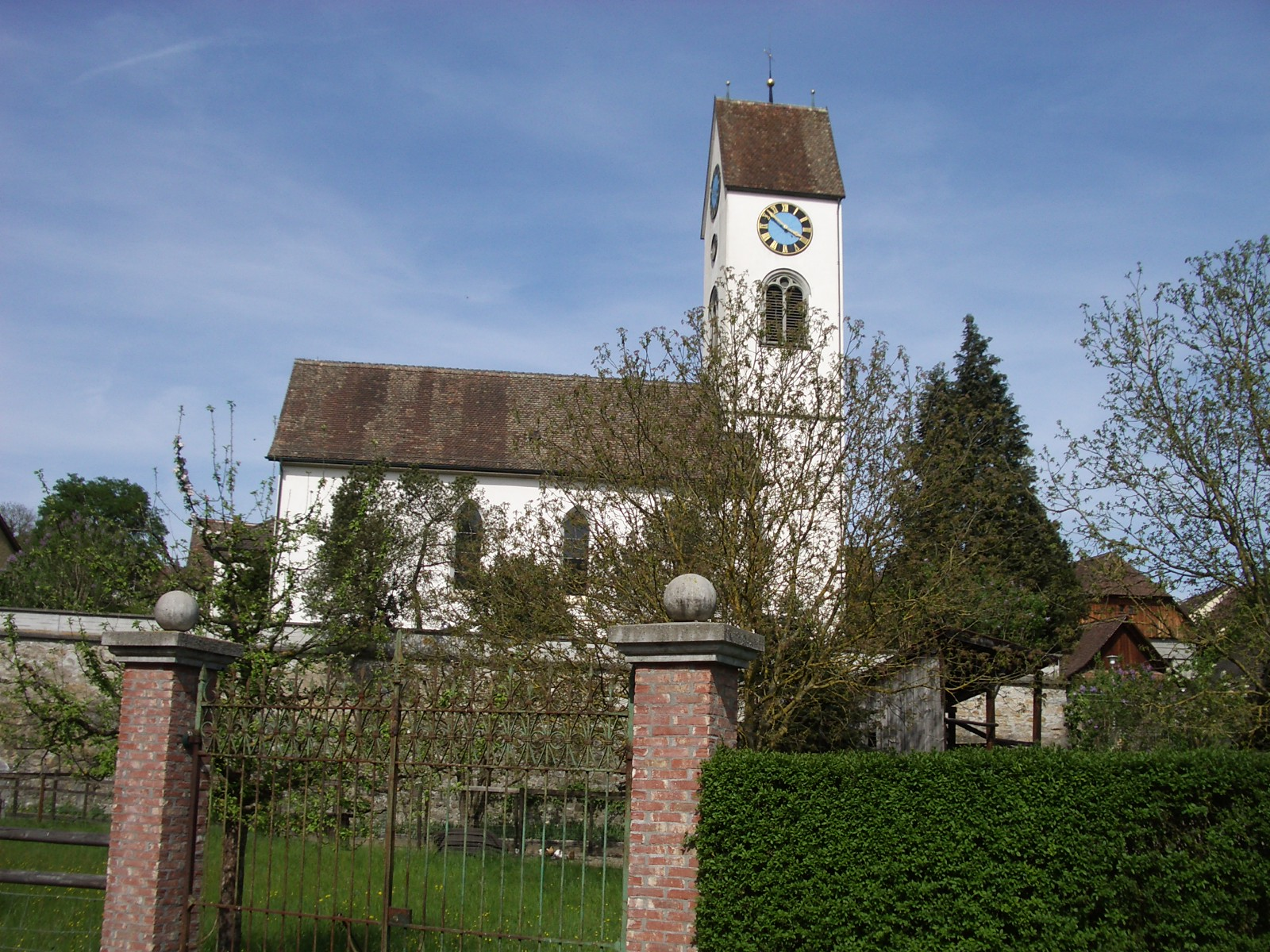
Glattfelden church

Aerial view from 100 m by Walter Mittelholzer (1919)

Glattfelden has an area of 12.3 km^{2} (4.7 sq mi). Of this area, 47.3% is used for agricultural purposes, while 32.1% is forested. Of the rest of the land, 17.5% is settled (buildings or roads) and the remainder (3.1%) is non-productive (rivers, glaciers or mountains).

The municipality includes the village of Glattfelden, located at the end of the Glatt valley, the communities of Zweidlen, Schachen and Rheinsfelden and the exclave of Neuhaus.

== Demographics ==
Glattfelden has a population (as of 31 December 2020) of 5,266. As of 2007, 18.3% of the population was made up of foreign nationals. Over the last 10 years the population has grown at a rate of 18.1%. Most of the population (as of 2000) speaks German (86.5%), with Italian being second most common ( 3.7%) and Albanian being third ( 2.7%).

In the 2007 election the most popular party was the SVP which received 47.9% of the vote. The next three most popular parties were the SPS (15.2%), the CSP (12.6%) and the Green Party (8.1%).

The age distribution of the population (as of 2000) is children and teenagers (0–19 years old) make up 26.1% of the population, while adults (20–64 years old) make up 62.9% and seniors (over 64 years old) make up 11%. In Glattfelden about 70.5% of the population (between age 25-64) have completed either non-mandatory upper secondary education or additional higher education (either university or a Fachhochschule).

Glattfelden has an unemployment rate of 2.72%. As of 2005, there were 69 people employed in the primary economic sector and about 27 businesses involved in this sector. 211 people are employed in the secondary sector and there are 49 businesses in this sector. 395 people are employed in the tertiary sector, with 95 businesses in this sector.

The historical population is given in the following table:

year	population
1634	593
1771	634
1836	1,098
1850	1,247
1880	1,756
1900	1,584
1950	2,209
2000	3,544

== Transportation ==
Glattfelden is served by two railway stations:

- Glattfelden railway station is a stop of the Zurich S-Bahn, a 29 minute ride from Zürich Hauptbahnhof (on line S9). The station lies about 2 kilometres (1.2 mi) east from the village, and has been built on territory belonging to the neighbor city of Bülach.
- Zweidlen railway station, on the other hand, is located on the territory of the municipality, but is some 3 kilometres (1.9 mi) to the west of the village. It is served by Zurich S-Bahn line S36, which connects Bülach with Koblenz and does not directly serve Zurich.

== Famous residents ==
- Gottfried Keller (1819–1890), Swiss author
