= Rheinau, Switzerland =

Rheinau
- Municipality
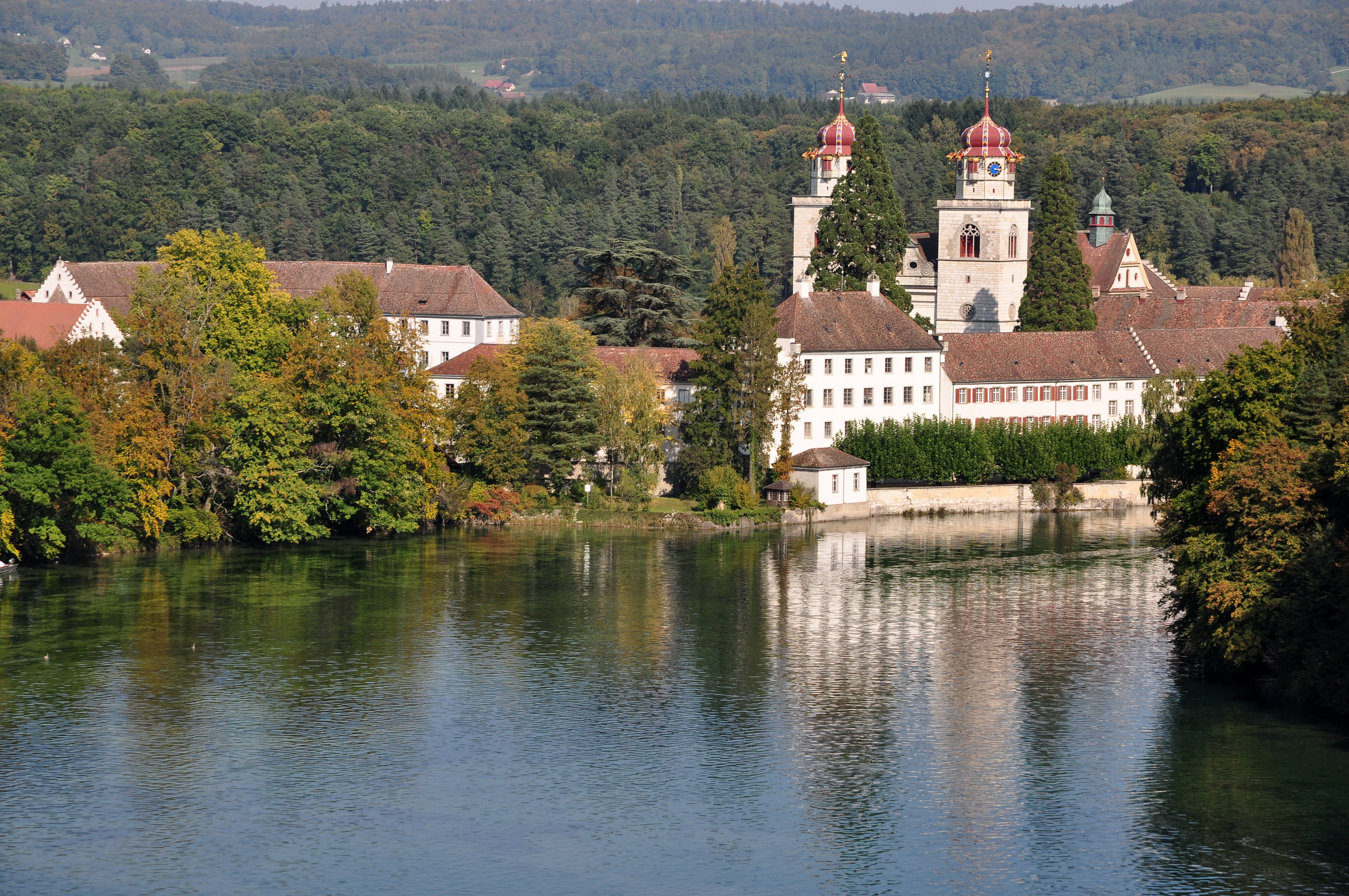

- Flag Coat of arms
- Location of Rheinau
- Location within Switzerland Location within Canton of Zurich
- Coordinates: 47°39′N 8°36′E
- Country: Switzerland
- Canton: Zurich
- District: Andelfingen

Area
  - Total: 8.96 km^{2} (3.46 sq mi)
- Elevation: 400 m (1,300 ft)

Population (December 2020)
  - Total: 1,287
  - Density: 144/km^{2} (372/sq mi)
- Time zone: UTC+01:00 (CET)
  - Summer (DST): UTC+02:00 (CEST)
- Postal code: 8462
- SFOS number: 38
- ISO 3166 code: CH-ZH
- Surrounded by: Benken, Dachsen, Jestetten (DE-BW), Lottstetten (DE-BW), Marthalen
- Website: www.rheinau.ch

Rheinau (German pronunciation: [ˈʁaɪnaʊ]) is a municipality in the district of Andelfingen in the canton of Zurich in Switzerland. It is located at a bend of the High Rhine, which forms the Swiss-German border in this area, and includes an island with an abbey. A bridge built in 1806 links Rheinau to Altenburg, part of the municipality of Jestetten (Baden-Württemberg).

== Geography ==
Rheinau has an area of 8.9 km^{2} (3.4 sq mi). Of this area, 26.8% is used for agricultural purposes, while 54.8% is forested. Of the rest of the land, 11.3% is settled (buildings or roads) and the remainder (7.2%) is non-productive (rivers, glaciers or mountains).

== Rheinau Abbey ==
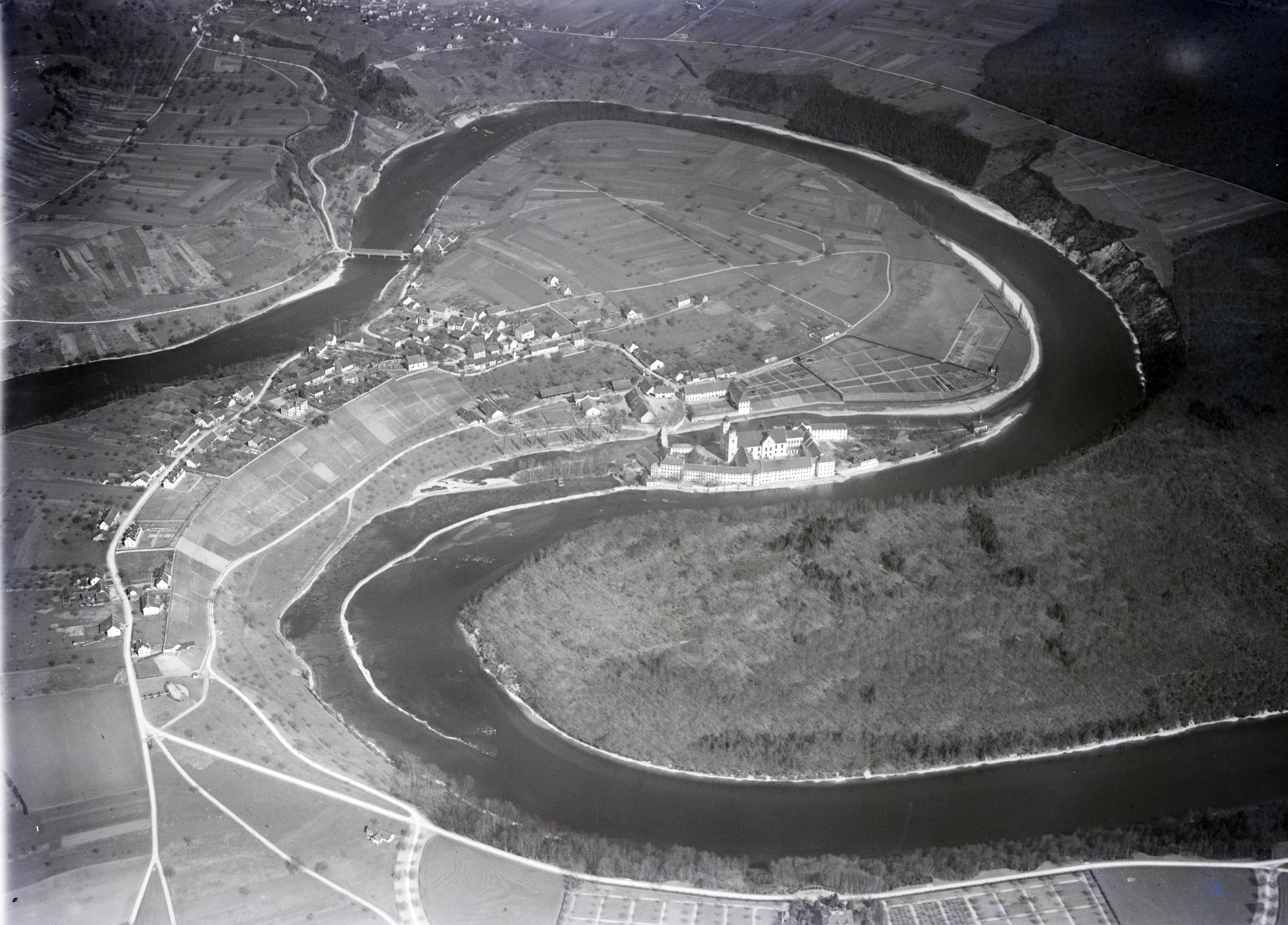
Aerial view from 500 m (1,600 ft) altitude by Walter Mittelholzer (1929)

The Rheinau Abbey was founded in 778 and grew until it was abandoned during the Protestant Reformation in 1529. It was re-established in 1532 and was a center of the Counter-Reformation. In 1862 the cantonal council decreed the dissolution of the abbey. Following the dissolution of the abbey, in 1867 a cantonal hospital and nursing home were set up in the buildings. Later, a cantonal psychiatric clinic that developed here was closed in 2000, since then, the buildings have stood empty.

The Abbey underwent a major refurbishment in the 2010s. The buildings are open to the public.

== Demographics ==
Rheinau has a population (as of 31 December 2020) of 1,287. As of 2007, 16.7% of the population was made up of foreign nationals. Over the last 10 years the population has grown at a rate of 4%. Most of the population (as of 2000) speaks German (91.2%), with Serbo-Croatian being second most common (2.4%) and French being third (0.8%).

In the 2007 election the most popular party was the SVP which received 28.4% of the vote. The next three most popular parties were the SPS (25.6%), the CVP (13%) and the Green Party (12.6%).

The age distribution of the population (as of 2000) is children and teenagers (0–19 years old) make up 22.6% of the population, while adults (20–64 years old) make up 58.8% and seniors (over 64 years old) make up 18.6%. In Rheinau about 64.1% of the population (between age 25–64) have completed either non-mandatory upper secondary education or additional higher education (either university or a Fachhochschule).

Rheinau has an unemployment rate of 1.3%. As of 2005, there were 23 people employed in the primary economic sector and about 3 businesses involved in this sector. 43 people are employed in the secondary sector and there are 10 businesses in this sector. 641 people are employed in the tertiary sector, with 42 businesses in this sector.

== Transport ==
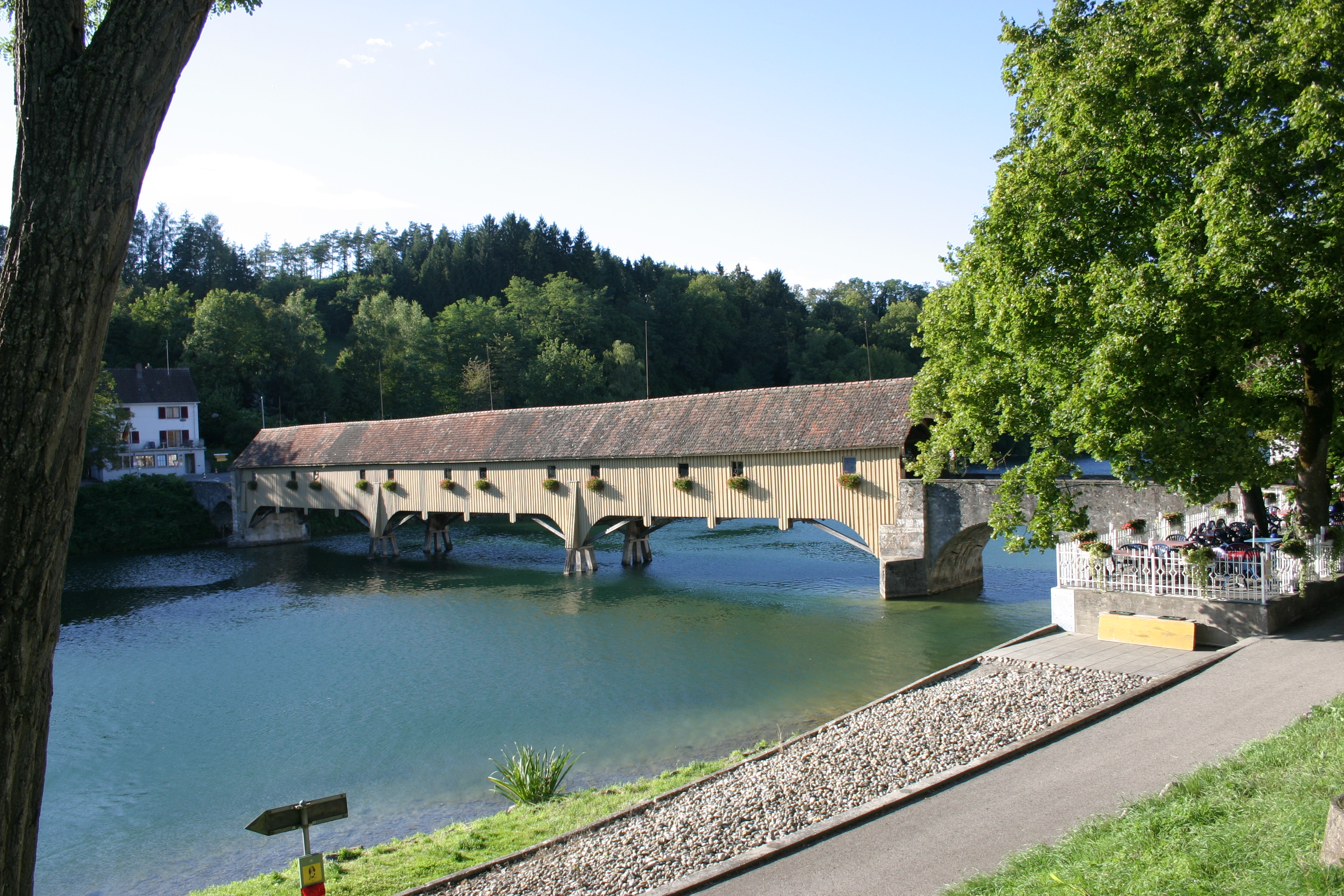
Rheinau-Altenburg bridge, built in 1806

Rheinau is served by a PostAuto bus, linking it with Marthalen railway station, which is served twice per hour by trains of Zurich S-Bahn lines S12 and S33.

Until 2010, Rheinau and the neighbouring Altenburg in the German municipality of Jestetten, was served by a Swiss railway station namely Altenburg-Rheinau, which, despite its location in Germany, is located on the Eglisau to Neuhausen line of the Swiss Federal Railway (SBB) that crosses the Germany–Switzerland border twice on its route between the Swiss cantons of Zurich and Schaffhausen.

Altenburg-Rheinau was one of only three Swiss operated stations located entirely within Germany, the other two being Jestetten and Lottstetten. The line running through Altenburg-Rheinau has no direct connection to the German railway network.

The station was a border station and as such was in local transport tariff zones in both Germany and Switzerland. Notwithstanding protests from the German authorities, the Swiss closed the station after 113 years of service, due to low passenger numbers. The last train to stop at Altenburg-Rheinau did so at 00:27 on 12 December 2010.
