= Lottstetten =

- Municipality
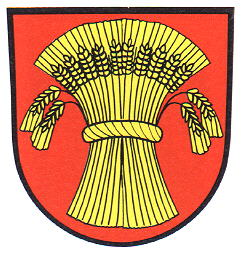
- Coat of arms

- Location of Lottstetten within Waldshut district
- Interactive map of Lottstetten
- Location within Germany Location within Baden-Württemberg
- Coordinates: 47°37′44″N 08°34′20″E
- Country: Germany
- State: Baden-Württemberg
- Admin. region: Freiburg
- District: Waldshut

Government
  - Mayor (2019–27): Andreas Morasch

Area
  - Total: 13.4 km^{2} (5.2 sq mi)
- Elevation: 433 m (1,421 ft)

Population (2025-12-31)
  - Total: 2,268
  - Density: 169/km^{2} (438/sq mi)
- Time zone: UTC+01:00 (CET)
  - Summer (DST): UTC+02:00 (CEST)
- Postal codes: 79807
- Dialling codes: 07745
- Vehicle registration: WT
- Website: www.lottstetten.de

Lottstetten (German pronunciation: [lɔtˈʃtɛtn̩]) is a municipality in the district of Waldshut in Baden-Württemberg in Germany.

== History ==
In 1806 Lottstetten became part of Baden.

From 1840 until 1935, the territory of Lottstetten together with Altenburg, Jestetten and what was then Dettighofen, was part of the region which formed a customs exclusion zone and was not part of the German customs area. Inhabitants were able to offer their produce to the rest of Germany as well as to Switzerland. This situation brought about a higher standard of living and prosperity compared to the rest of Germany.

== Geography ==
Lottstetten is surrounded on three sides by the international and customs border with Switzerland. To the west, south and east of the village lies the Rhine and Swiss territory. Road border crossings into Switzerland are located near Lottstetten with Rafz in canton Zurich, with Solgen part of Rafz and the Nack to Ischläg crossing in Rüdlingen municipality, canton Schaffhausen.

Lottstetten in Waldshut district

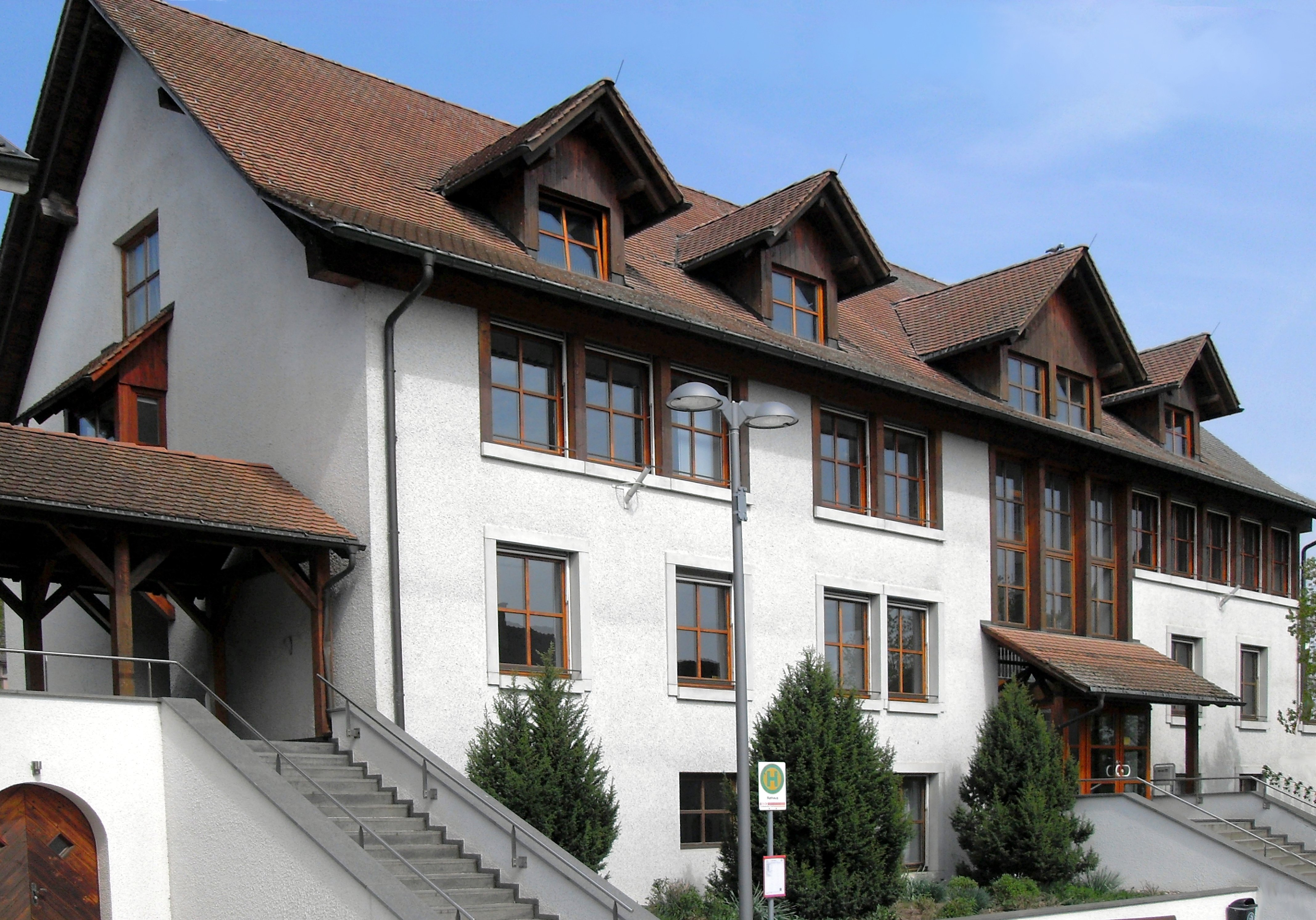
Lottstetten Town hall (Rathaus)

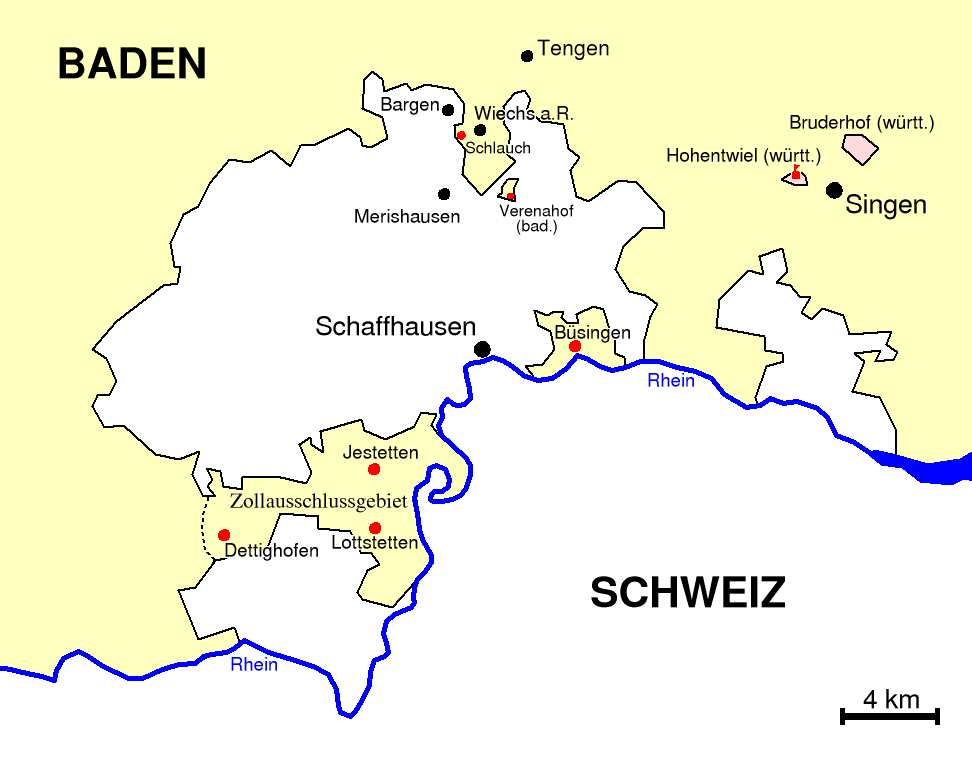
Customs exclusion zone (1840–1935)

== Demographics ==
Population development:

Year	Inhabitants
1990	2,140
2001	2,207
2011	2,100
2021	2,294

== Transport ==
=== Railway ===
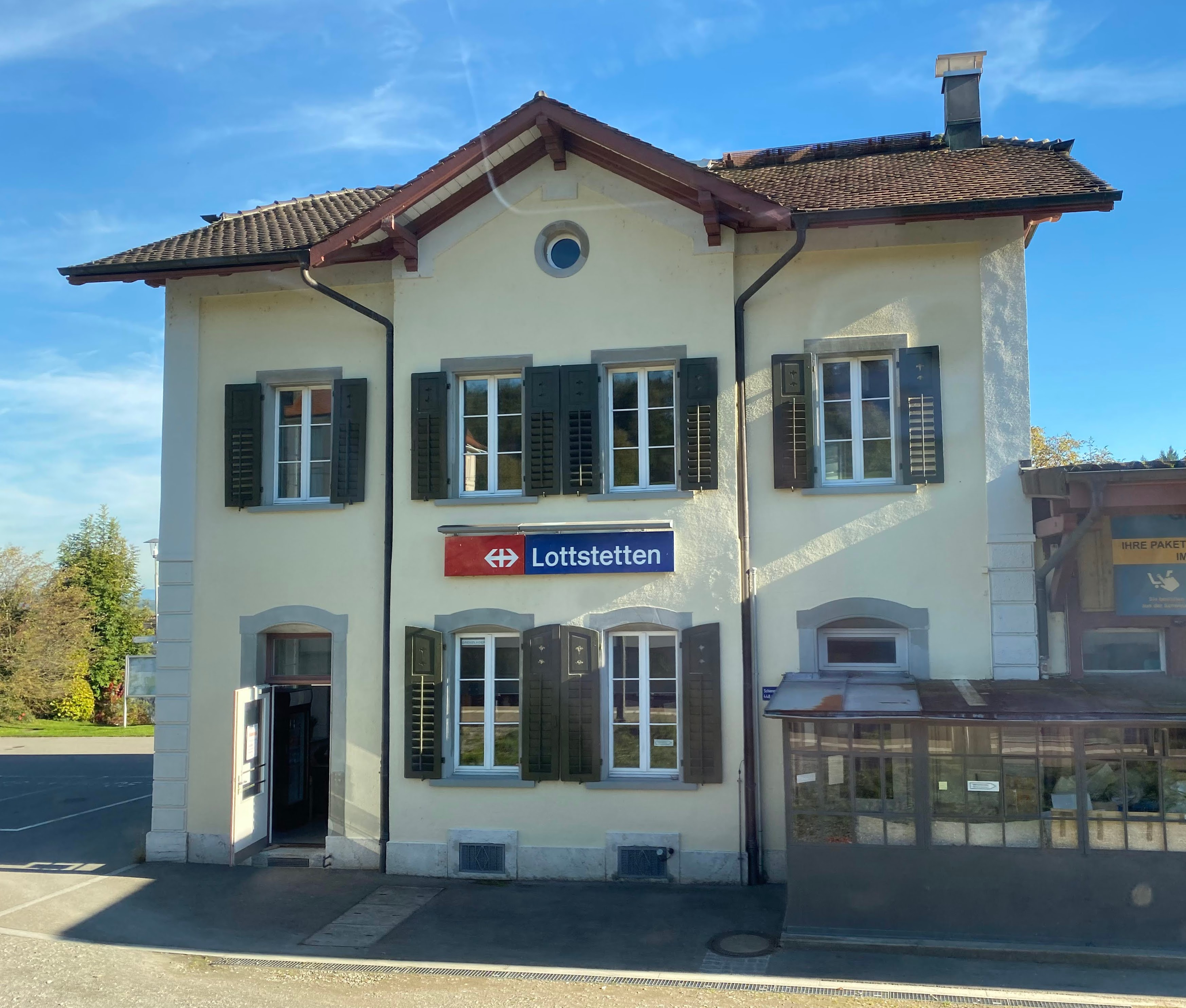
Lottstetten railway station with the SBB logo

Lottstetten railway station is situated on the Swiss Federal Railway's cross-border Eglisau-Neuhausen railway line and is served by Zürich S-Bahn line S9. Lottstetten is one of only two Swiss operated stations located entirely within Germany, the other being Jestetten. Until December 2010 a third station was in operation, namely Altenburg-Rheinau, located in Altenburg, part of Jestetten, close to the border with Neuhausen am Rheinfall, Switzerland, however despite protests from the German authorities, the station was closed by the Swiss due to low passenger numbers.

None of the lines running to or through Lottstetten have a direct rail connection to the German railway network.

The station is a border station and as such is in local transport tariff zones in both Germany and Switzerland.

Trains which pass through Lottstetten without stopping at any of the stations on the line in Germany, are not subject to any customs formalities or restrictions of either country, despite the train and its passengers technically leaving the Swiss Customs Area, entering the European Union customs area and entering Swiss customs territory again. An agreement in this respect was entered into by the two countries and became law in 1936.

=== Ferryboat ===
In the summer months a small ferryboat service on the Rhine is in operation connecting Nack, a hamlet of Lottstetten, with Ellikon am Rhein, part of Marthalen, in neighbouring Switzerland. A ferry service is documented as being in exist as far back as 1500. The current service has been running since 1905, however when World War II broke out, Switzerland closed the border and the ferryboat service did not run during the war. Until 1972 there was a customs check point on the Swiss riverbank. Today the ferry may still be used by Swiss customs officers.
