= Lottstetten station =

Swiss owned railway station in Lottstetten, Germany

Lottstetten
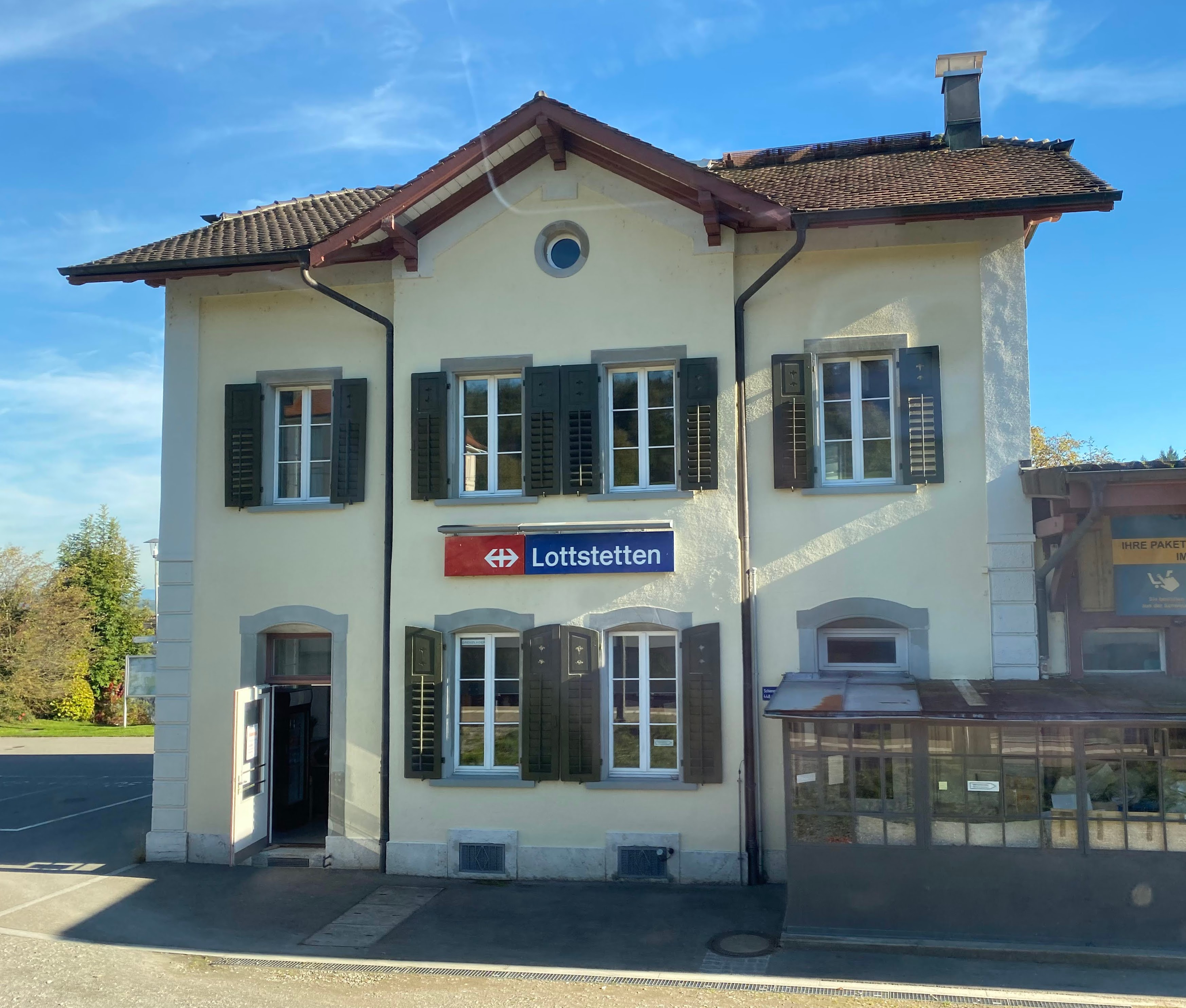
- Station in 2022

General information
- Location: Bahnhofstraße; Lottstetten; Baden-Württemberg; Germany
- Coordinates: 47.625571°N 8.566793°E
- Elevation: 448 m (1,470 ft)
- Owner: Swiss Federal Railways
- Operator: Swiss Federal Railways
- Line: Eglisau-Neuhausen
- Platforms: 1 side platform
- Tracks: 1

Other information
- Fare zone: 837 (Tarifverbund Ostwind)

Services
Preceding station	Zurich S-Bahn	Following station
Jestetten towards Schaffhausen	S9	Rafz towards Uster
Jestetten towards Schaffhausen	SN65 Limited service	Rafz towards Bülach
Location
- Location within Germany Location within Baden-Württemberg

Lottstetten is a railway station in the German state of Baden-Württemberg, located in municipality of Lottstetten in the district of Waldshut. Despite its location in Germany, the station is owned and operated by Swiss Federal Railways.

== Operation ==
The station is operated by the SBB and is served by Zurich S-Bahn line S9 that provides an hourly service between Zurich and Schaffhausen.

- Zurich S-Bahn S9: hourly service to Uster (via Zürich HB) and Schaffhausen.

During weekends, there is also a Nighttime S-Bahn service (SN65) offered by ZVV.

- SN65: hourly service to Schaffhausen and Bülach (via Rafz).

Since 2007, the station has no ticket counter and has no longer been staffed.

== Special situation ==
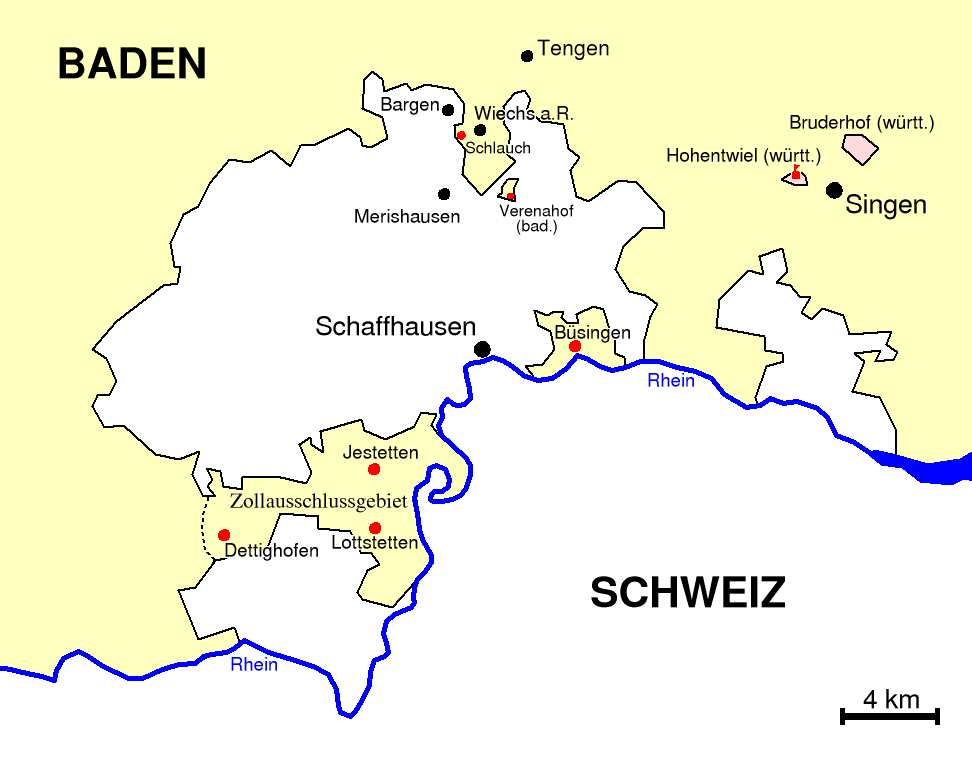
Customs exclusion zone (1840–1935)

The station is located on the Eglisau to Neuhausen line of the Swiss Federal Railways (SBB) that crosses the Germany–Switzerland border twice on its route between the Swiss cantons of Zurich and Schaffhausen. Lottstetten is one of only two Swiss operated stations located entirely within Germany, the other being Jestetten. Until December 2010 a third station was in operation, namely Altenburg-Rheinau, located in Altenburg, part of Jestetten, close to the border with Neuhausen am Rheinfall, Switzerland, however despite protests from the German authorities, the station was closed by the Swiss due to low passenger numbers.

None of the lines running to or through Lottstetten have a direct rail connection to the German railway network.

The station is a border station and as such is in local transport tariff zones in both Germany and Switzerland.

Trains which pass through Lottstetten without stopping at any of the stations on the line in Germany, are not subject to any customs formalities or restrictions of either country, despite the train and its passengers technically leaving the Swiss customs area, entering the European Union customs area and entering the Swiss customs area again. An agreement in this respect was entered into by the two countries and became law in 1936. From 1840 until 1935, Lottstetten, along with Altenburg, Jestetten and what was then Dettighofen, was part of the region which formed a customs exclusion zone and was not part of the German customs area.

== Customs ==
Lottstetten is a border station for passengers arriving from Switzerland. Customs checks may be performed in Lottstetten station by German officials. Systematic passport controls were abolished when Switzerland joined the Schengen Area in 2008.

== See also ==
- High Rhine Railway – a nearby German railway line with stations in Switzerland
