= Altenburg-Rheinau station =

Disused railway station in Germany

Altenburg-Rheinau
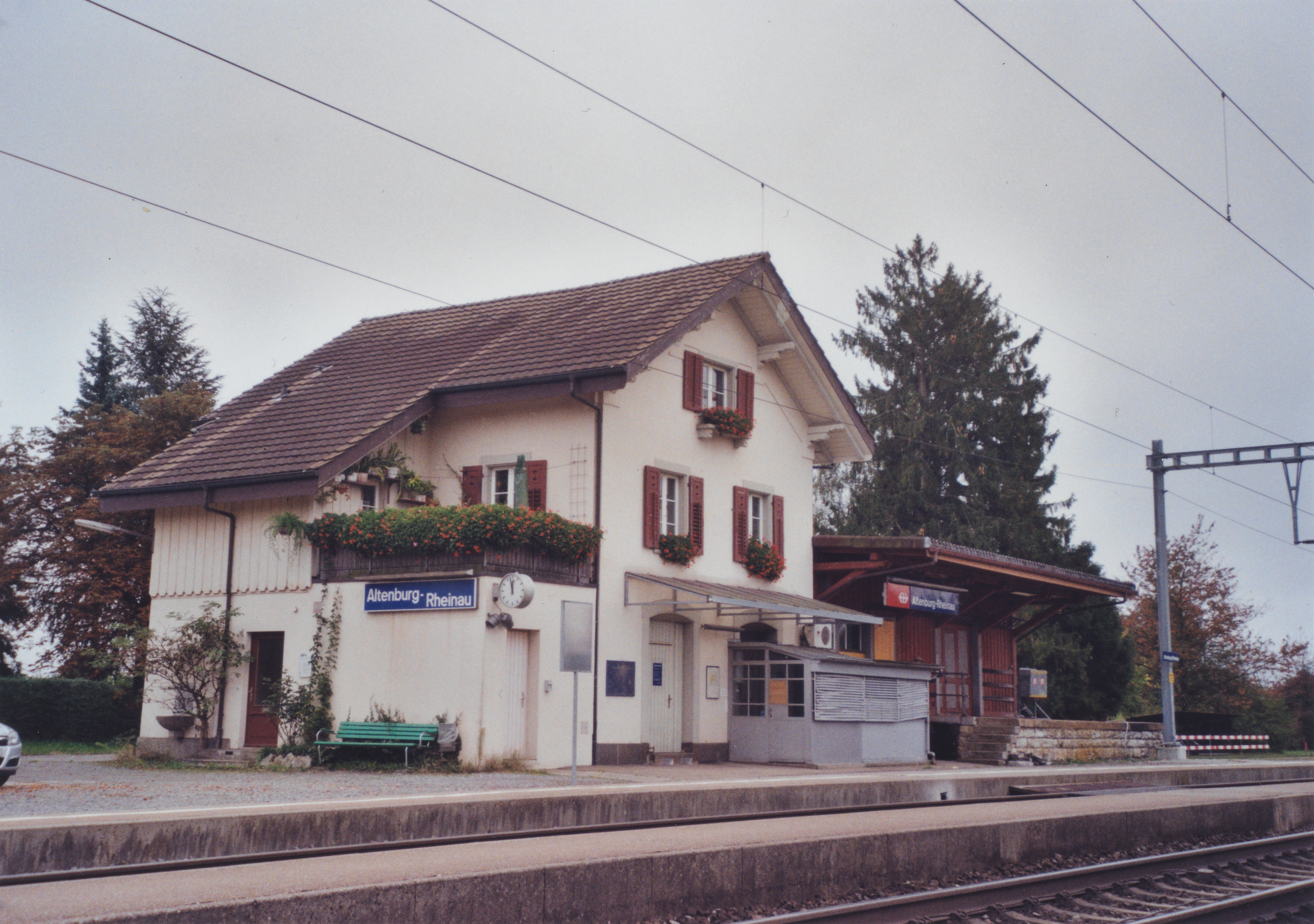
- Station building and goods shed in 2010

General information
- Other names: Bahnhof Altenburg-Rheinau
- Location: Stationsstraße 13, Jestetten; Germany
- Coordinates: 47°39′49.1184″N 08°35′48.7644″E
- Elevation: 428 m (1,404 ft)
- Operator: Thurbo (until 2010)
- Line: Eglisau–Neuhausen railway line
- Platforms: 1
- Tracks: 2 (German: Gleis)

Construction
- Structure type: at-grade
- Platform levels: 1

History
- Opened: 1897
- Closed: 2010
Location
- Location within Germany Location within Baden-Württemberg

Altenburg-Rheinau (German: Bahnhof Altenburg-Rheinau) was a railway station in the municipality of Jestetten in the German state of Baden-Württemberg, serving the villages of Altenburg (Jestetten municipality) and Rheinau in the Swiss canton of Zurich. It was located between Jestetten and Neuhausen Rheinfall stations on the border crossing Eglisau–Neuhausen railway line, which is owned and operated by Swiss Federal Railways (SBB).

== History ==
The station, which opened in 1897, was last called at by the former S22 service of Zurich S-Bahn.

The station was closed in 2010 due to low passenger frequency, despite protests from the German authorities. Since the closure, platforms and station track have been removed.

== Special situation ==
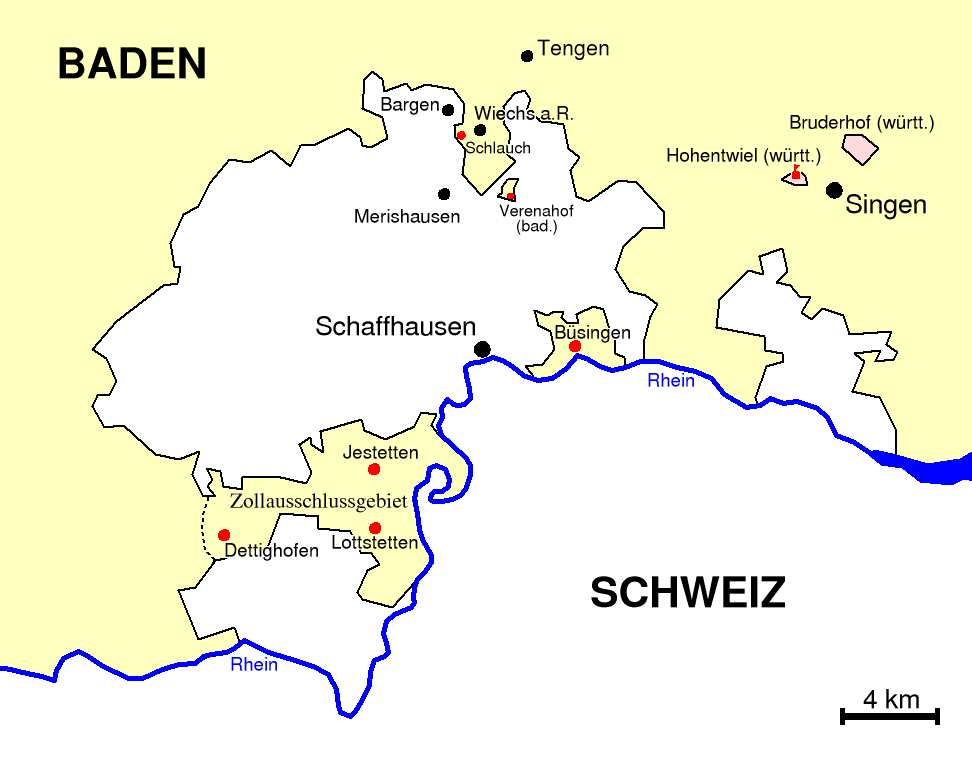
Customs exclusion zone (1840–1935)

The station was located on the Eglisau to Neuhausen line of the Swiss Federal Railways (SBB) that crosses the Germany–Switzerland border twice on its route between the Swiss cantons of Zurich and Schaffhausen.

None of the lines running through Altenburg-Rheinau have a direct rail connection to the German railway network.

The station was a border station and as such was in local transport tariff zones in both Germany and Switzerland.

Trains which passed through Altenburg-Rheinau without stopping at any of the stations on the line in Germany, were not subject to any customs formalities or restrictions of either country, despite the train and its passengers technically leaving the Swiss Customs Area, entering the European Union customs area and entering Swiss customs territory again. An agreement in this respect was entered into by the two countries and became law in 1936.

From 1840 until 1935, Altenburg, along with Jestetten, Lottstetten and what was then Dettighofen, was part of the region which formed a customs exclusion zone and was not part of the German customs area.

== Customs ==
Altenburg-Rheinau was a border station for passengers arriving from Switzerland. Customs checks were able to be performed in Altenburg-Rheinau station by German officials. Systematic passport controls were abolished when Switzerland joined the Schengen Area in 2008.

== See also ==
- Ghost station
