= Neuhausen Rheinfall railway station =

Railway station in Switzerland

Neuhausen Rheinfall
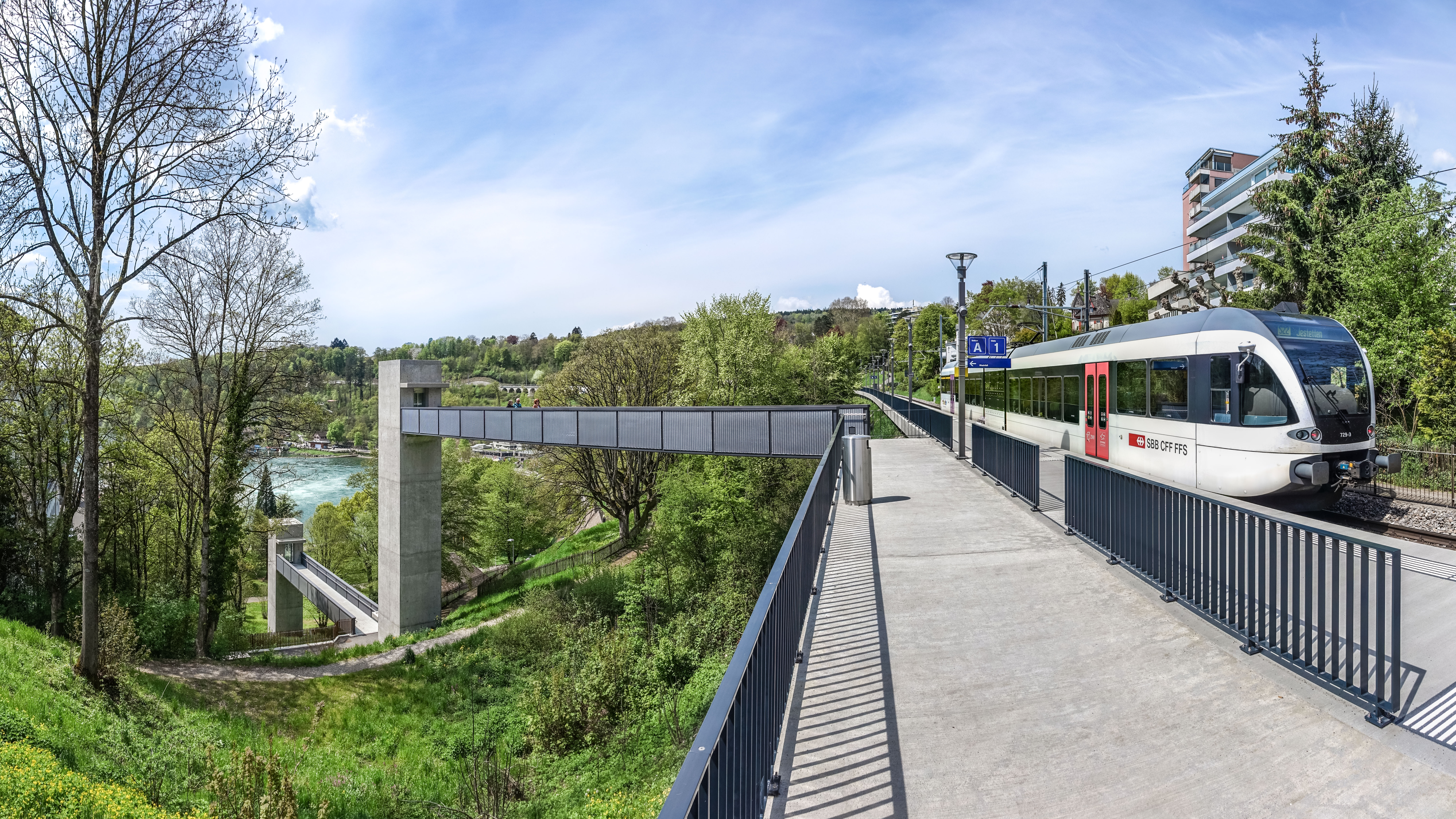
- The station with elevators to the Rhine Falls

General information
- Location: Neuhausen am Rheinfall, Schaffhausen; Switzerland
- Coordinates: 47.680653°N 8.614498°E
- Elevation: 402 m (1,319 ft)
- Owner: Swiss Federal Railways
- Operator: Swiss Federal Railways
- Line: Eglisau to Neuhausen line
- Platforms: 1 side platform
- Connections
- Bus: Verkehrsbetriebe Schaffhausen (VBSH) routes 1 7

Other information
- Fare zone: 810 (Tarifverbund Ostwind)

History
- Opened: 13 December 2015

Passengers
- 2018: 730 per weekday

Services
Preceding station	Zurich S-Bahn	Following station
Neuhausen towards Schaffhausen	S9	Jestetten towards Uster
Schaffhausen Terminus	SN65 Limited service	Jestetten towards Bülach
Preceding station	Schaffhausen S-Bahn	Following station
Neuhausen towards Schaffhausen	S65	Jestetten Terminus
Location
- Location within Switzerland Location within Canton of Schaffhausen

Neuhausen Rheinfall (German: Bahnhof Neuhausen Rheinfall) is a railway station in Neuhausen am Rheinfall, in the Swiss canton of Schaffhausen. The station opened on 13 December 2015, principally to serve the tourist attraction of the Rhine Falls (German: Rheinfall), from which it takes its name. It is linked by a combination of bridges and elevators to the bank of the River Rhine, just below the waterfall.

Neuhausen Rheinfall station is one of two stations intended to serve the Rhine Falls, the other being Schloss Laufen am Rheinfall on the opposite bank of the river (below Laufen Castle).

== Location ==
The station is located on the Eglisau to Neuhausen line of the Swiss Federal Railways (SBB) that crosses the international border twice on its route between the Swiss cantons of Zurich and Schaffhausen. The station is operated by the SBB and is an intermediate stop on the Zurich S-Bahn line S9 between Zürich and Schaffhausen, and the Schaffhausen S-Bahn between Jestetten and Schaffhausen. Both lines operate hourly for most of the day, combining to provide a half-hourly service to and from Schaffhausen.

Neuhausen Rheinfall station is one of three stations in Neuhausen am Rheinfall, the other two being Neuhausen, which is the next station in the direction of Schaffhausen on the same line, and Neuhausen Badischer Bahnhof, which is on a different line (High Rhine Railway line). Neuhausen Badischer Bahnhof lies about 500 metres (1,600 ft) to the north-west, whilst Neuhausen station is 750 metres (2,460 ft) to the north-east.

== Train services ==
The railway station is served exclusively by regional trains (S-Bahn). Services calling at the station are Zurich S-Bahn line S9 and an unnumbered line of Schaffhausen S-Bahn (operated by Thurbo):

- Zurich S-Bahn S9: hourly service to Uster (via Zürich HB) and to Schaffhausen.
- Schaffhausen S-Bahn S65: hourly service to Jestetten and to Schaffhausen.

During weekends, there is also a Nighttime S-Bahn service (SN65) offered by ZVV.

- SN65: hourly service to Schaffhausen and Bülach (via Rafz).

== Bus services ==
There is no direct bus connection at the station. The two nearest bus stops are Neuhausen, Industrieplatz, ca. 50 metres (160 ft) away and served by municipal bus line 7, and Neuhausen, Zentrum, 150 metres (490 ft) away in the center of Neuhausen am Rheinfall and served by bus routes 1 and 7.

== Customs ==
As the next railway station is Jestetten, which is in Germany, Neuhausen Rheinfall is a border station for passengers arriving from Germany. Customs checks may be performed aboard trains and at Neuhausen Rheinfall station by Swiss officials. Systematic passport controls were abolished when Switzerland joined the Schengen Area in 2008.

== See also ==
- Rail transport in Switzerland
