= Jestetten station =

Swiss owned railway station in Jestetten, Germany

Jestetten
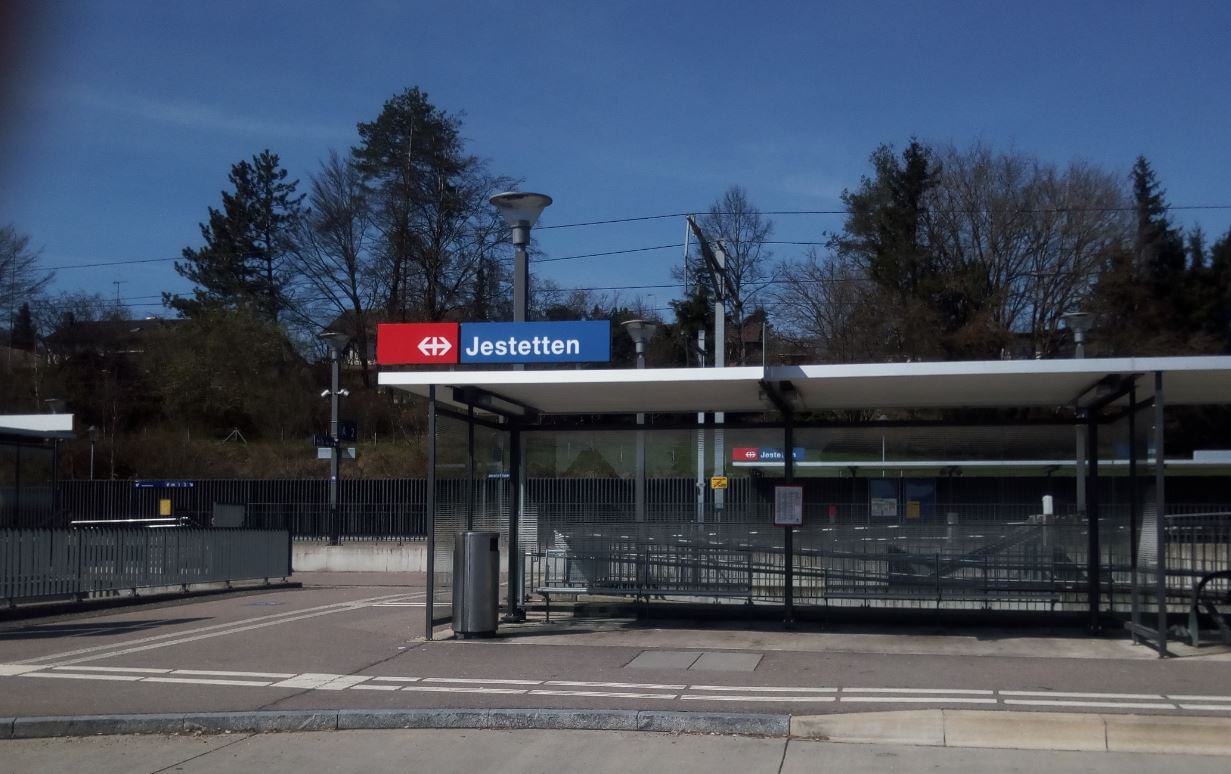
- View of the Swiss railway station in Jestetten, Germany

General information
- Location: Bahnhofstraße; Jestetten; Baden-Württemberg; Germany
- Coordinates: 47.654208°N 8.573231°E
- Elevation: 438 m (1,437 ft)
- Owner: Swiss Federal Railways
- Operator: Swiss Federal Railways, Thurbo
- Line: Eglisau-Neuhausen
- Platforms: 1 island platform, 1 side platform
- Tracks: 3
- Connections
- Bus: Südbadenbus line 7347

Other information
- Fare zone: 820 (Tarifverbund Ostwind)

Services
Preceding station	Zurich S-Bahn	Following station
Neuhausen Rheinfall towards Schaffhausen	S9	Lottstetten towards Uster
Neuhausen Rheinfall towards Schaffhausen	SN65 Limited service	Lottstetten towards Bülach
Preceding station	Schaffhausen S-Bahn	Following station
Neuhausen Rheinfall towards Schaffhausen	S65	Terminus
Location
- Location within Germany Location within Baden-Württemberg

Jestetten is a railway station in the German state of Baden-Württemberg, located in the municipality of Jestetten in the district of Waldshut. Despite its location in Germany, it is owned and operated by Swiss Federal Railways.

== Operation ==
The station is operated by the SBB and is served by Zurich S-Bahn line S9 between Zurich and Schaffhausen and the Schaffhausen S-Bahn S65 service to Schaffhausen. Both lines operate hourly for most of the day, combining to provide a half-hourly service to and from Schaffhausen.

- Zurich S-Bahn:
  - S9: hourly service to Uster (via Zürich HB) and Schaffhausen.
- Schaffhausen S-Bahn:
  - S65: hourly service to Schaffhausen (via Neuhausen Rheinfall).

During weekends, there is also a Nighttime S-Bahn service (SN65) offered by ZVV.

- SN65: hourly service to Schaffhausen and Bülach (via Rafz).

Jestetten railway station is also served by a bus line of Südbadenbus.

Since 2002, the station has no ticket counter and has no longer been staffed.

== Special situation ==
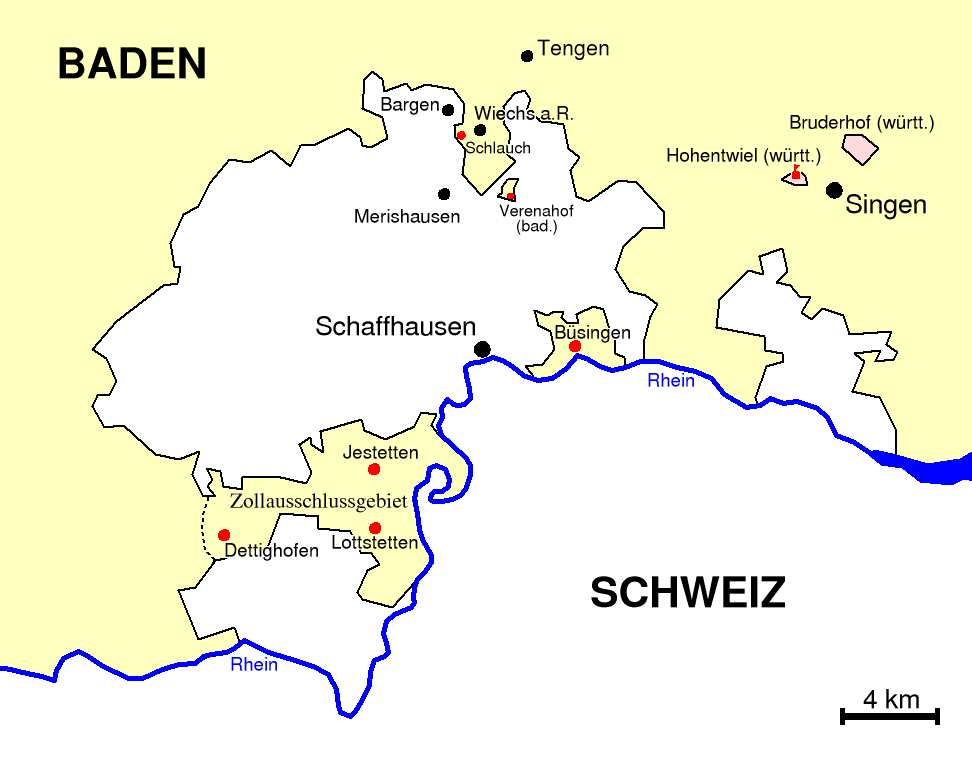
Customs exclusion zone (1840–1935)

The station is located on the Eglisau to Neuhausen line of the Swiss Federal Railways (SBB) that crosses the Germany–Switzerland border twice on its route between the Swiss cantons of Zurich and Schaffhausen. Jestetten is one of only two Swiss operated stations located entirely within Germany, the other being Lottstetten. Until December 2010 a third station was still in operation, namely Altenburg-Rheinau, located in Altenburg, part of Jesttetten, close to the border with Neuhausen am Rheinfall, Switzerland, however despite protests from the German authorities, the station was closed by the Swiss due to low passenger numbers.

None of the lines running to or through Jestetten have a direct rail connection to the German railway network.

The station is a border station and as such is in local transport tariff zones in both Germany and Switzerland.

Trains which pass through Jestetten without stopping at any of the stations on the line in Germany, are not subject to any customs formalities or restrictions of either country, despite the train and its passengers technically leaving the Swiss Customs Area, entering the European Union customs area and entering Swiss customs territory again. An agreement in this respect was entered into by the two countries and became law in 1936. From 1840 until 1935, Jestetten, along with Altenburg, Lottstetten and what was then Dettighofen, was part of the region which formed a customs exclusion zone and was not part of the German customs area.

== Customs ==
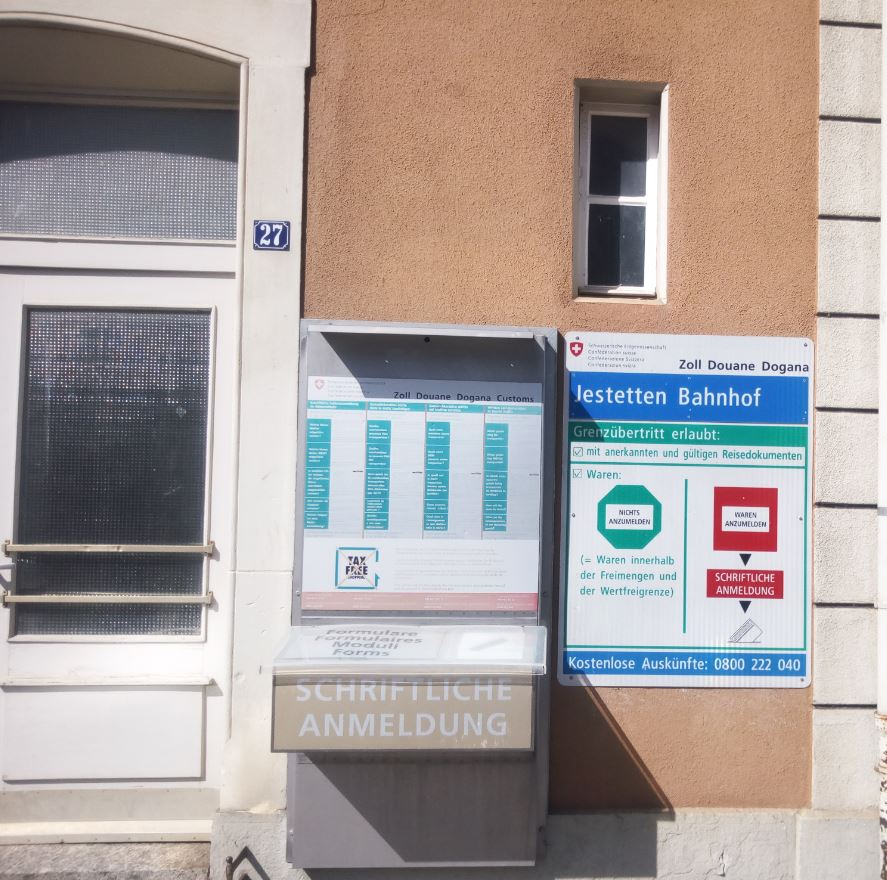
Swiss customs facilities located at Jestetten railway station, in Germany

Jestetten is a border station for passengers arriving from Switzerland. Customs checks may be performed in Jestetten station by German officials. Systematic passport controls were abolished when Switzerland joined the Schengen Area in 2008.

== See also ==
- High Rhine Railway – a nearby German railway line with stations in Switzerland
