= Neuhausen am Rheinfall =

- Municipality
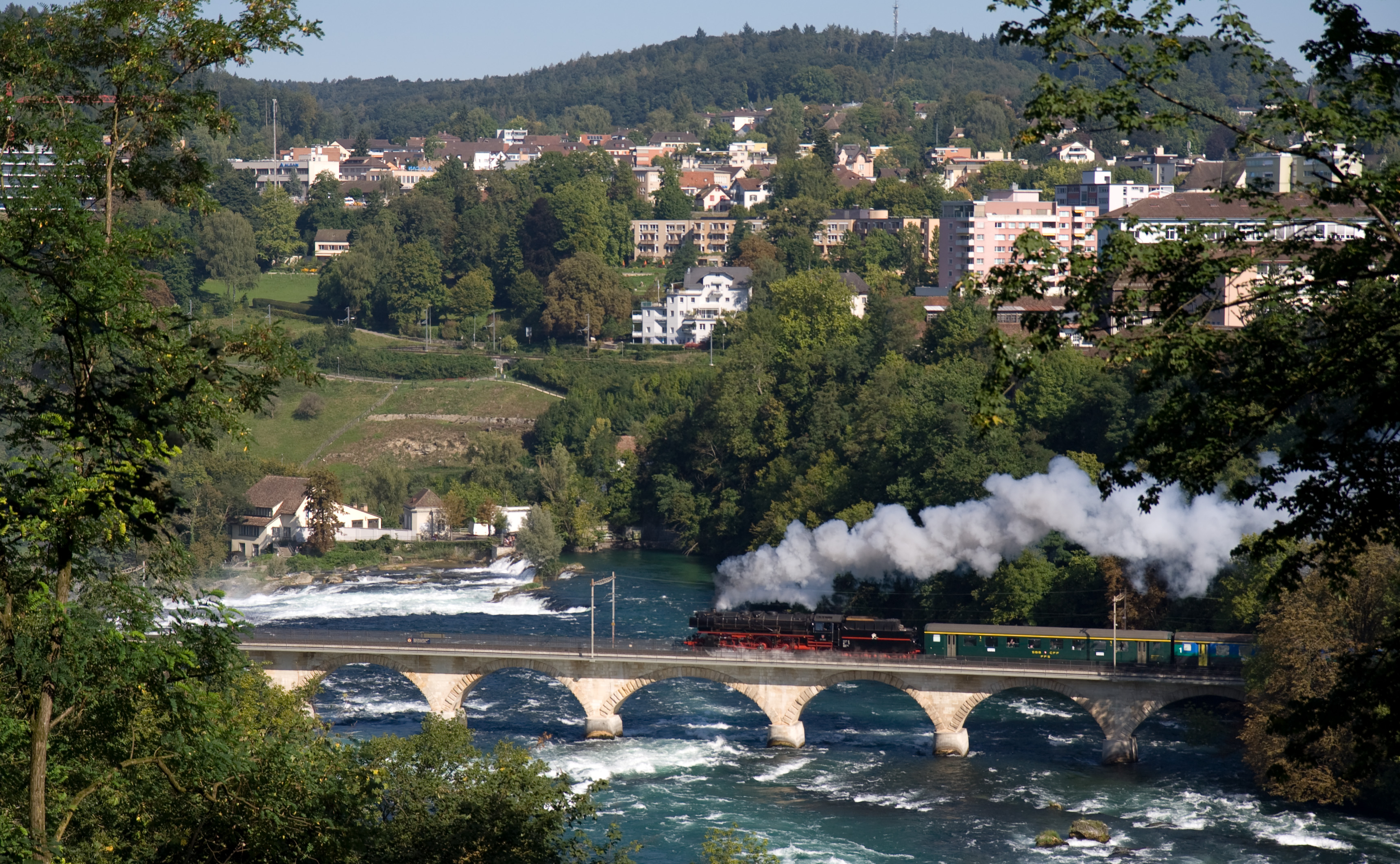

- Flag Coat of arms
- Location of Neuhausen am Rheinfall
- Location within Switzerland Location within Canton of Schaffhausen
- Coordinates: 47°41′N 8°37′E
- Country: Switzerland
- Canton: Schaffhausen
- District: n.a.

Government
  - Mayor: Stephan Rawyler FDP/PRD (as of 2008)

Area
  - Total: 8 km^{2} (3.1 sq mi)
- Elevation: 410 m (1,350 ft)

Population (December 2020)
  - Total: 10,467
  - Density: 1,300/km^{2} (3,400/sq mi)
- Time zone: UTC+01:00 (CET)
  - Summer (DST): UTC+02:00 (CEST)
- Postal code: 8212
- SFOS number: 2937
- ISO 3166 code: CH-SH
- Surrounded by: Beringen, Flurlingen (ZH), Guntmadingen, Jestetten (DE-BW), Laufen-Uhwiesen (ZH), Schaffhausen
- Website: www.neuhausen.ch

Neuhausen am Rheinfall (sometimes abbreviated as Neuhausen a. Rhf., called Neuhausen until 1938) is a town and a municipality in the canton of Schaffhausen in Switzerland. The town is close to the Rhine Falls (German: Rheinfall), mainland Europe's largest waterfall.

== History ==
Neuhausen am Rheinfall was first mentioned in 900/910 as Niuhusen. In 1253 it was mentioned as Niuwenhusin.

== Coat of arms ==
The German blazon reads: In gelb über grünem Kleeblatt weisses nach rechts gekehrtes Rebmesser mit braunem Griff.

The municipality's arms might in English heraldic language be described thus: Or in base a cloverleaf couped vert above which a billhook toward dexter argent hafted brunâtre.

In 1569, Neuhausen bore arms with a gold field and a leaping silver salmon. This symbolized the importance of fishing to the municipality. Shortly thereafter, the arms appeared with different tinctures; the field was now red. With the lessening importance of fishing, the arms, too, presumably ended up being forgotten, for in 1822, arms appeared bearing the current charges, the cloverleaf and the billhook. These two charges illustrate nothing extraordinary and likely stem from the sealmaker's lack of imagination, for he also chose the same charges for many other municipalities in the Schaffhausen area.

When the coat of arms was revised in 1949, the municipal council and the community association chose the historical arms, as there was a firm basis for them and they were unique for Schaffhausen. Shortly after this decision, though, a referendum was held in which the more modern arms won out.

== Geography ==
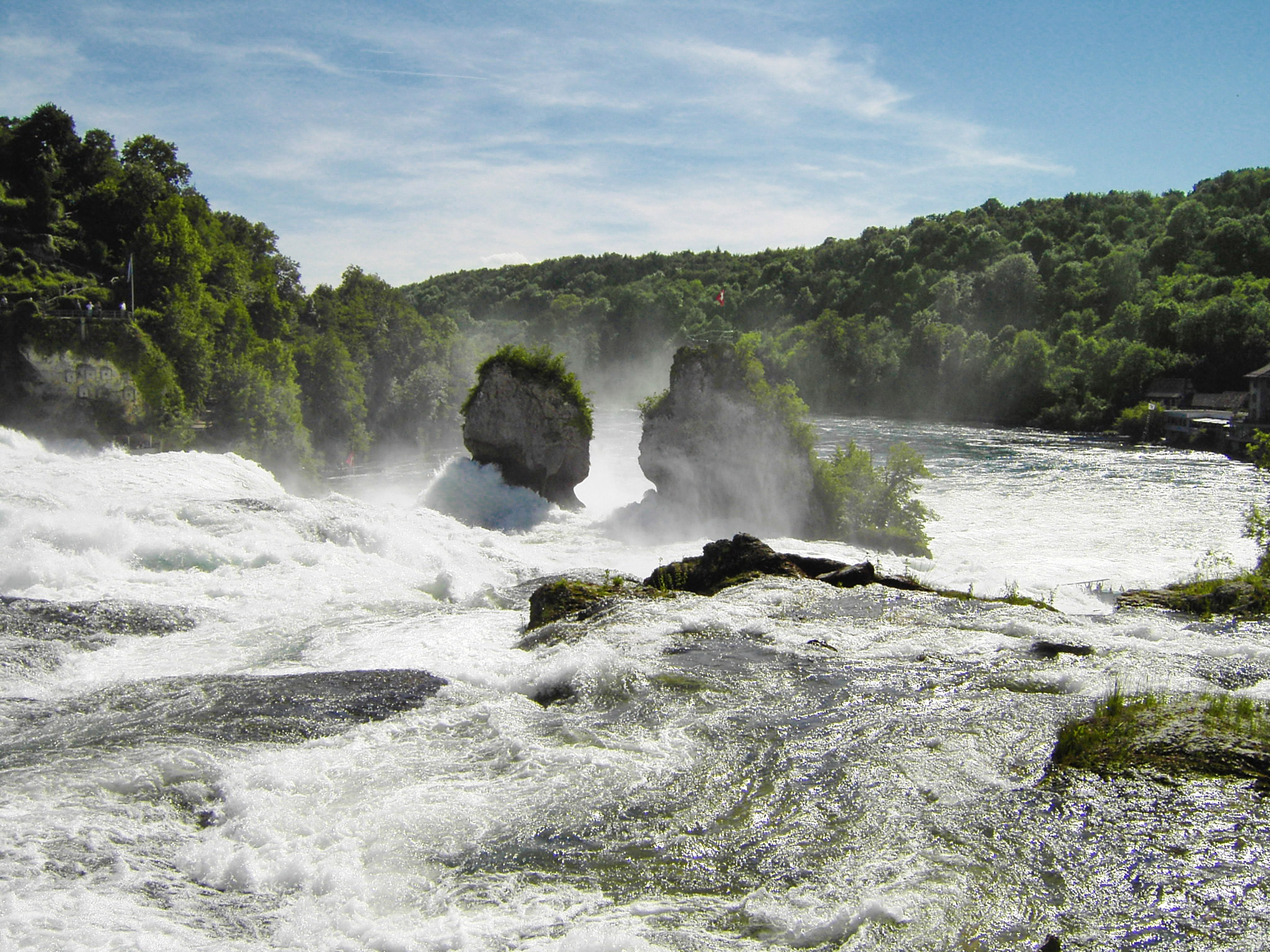
Rhine Falls at Neuhausen

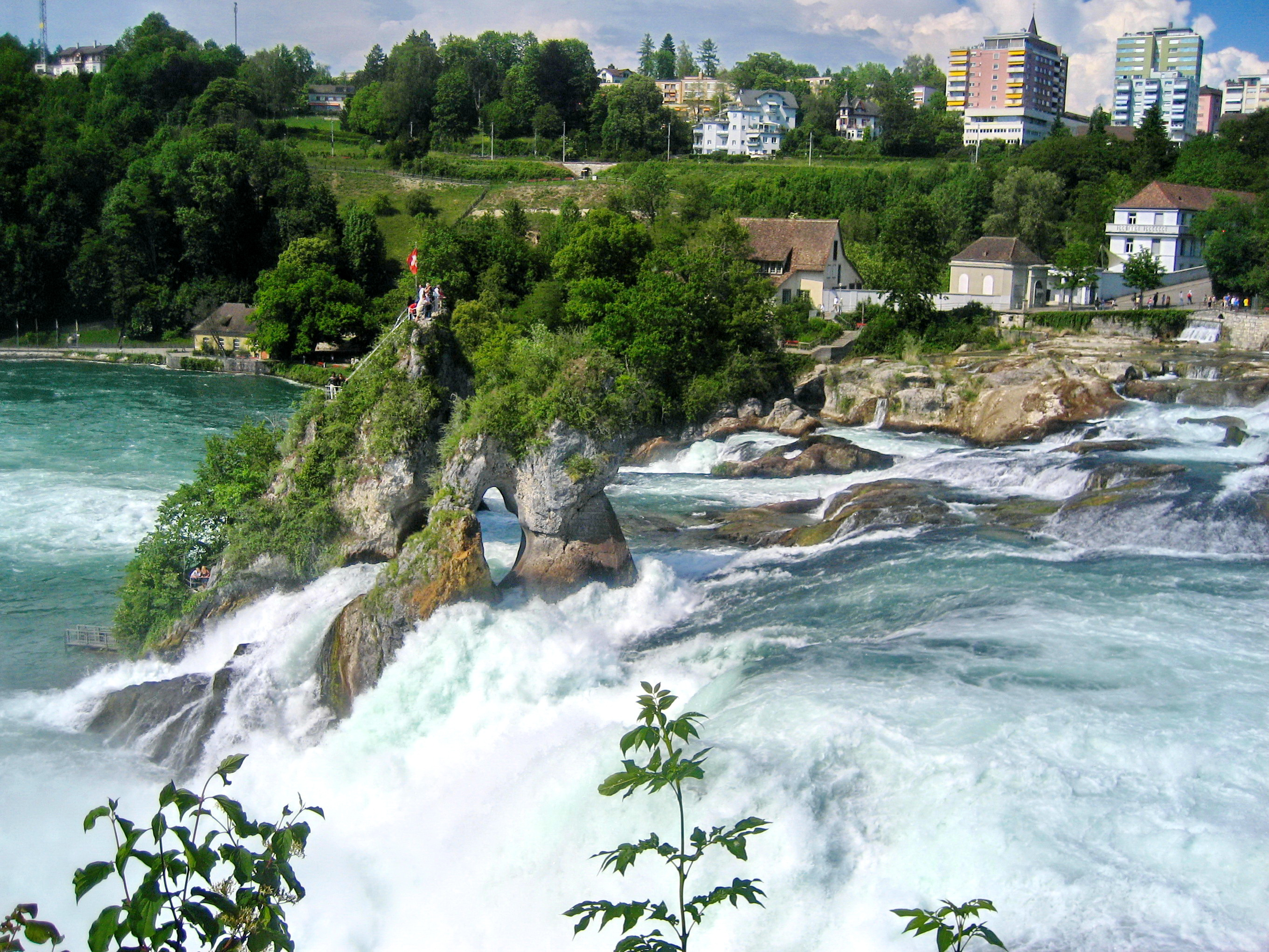
Neuhausen as seen from Rhine Falls

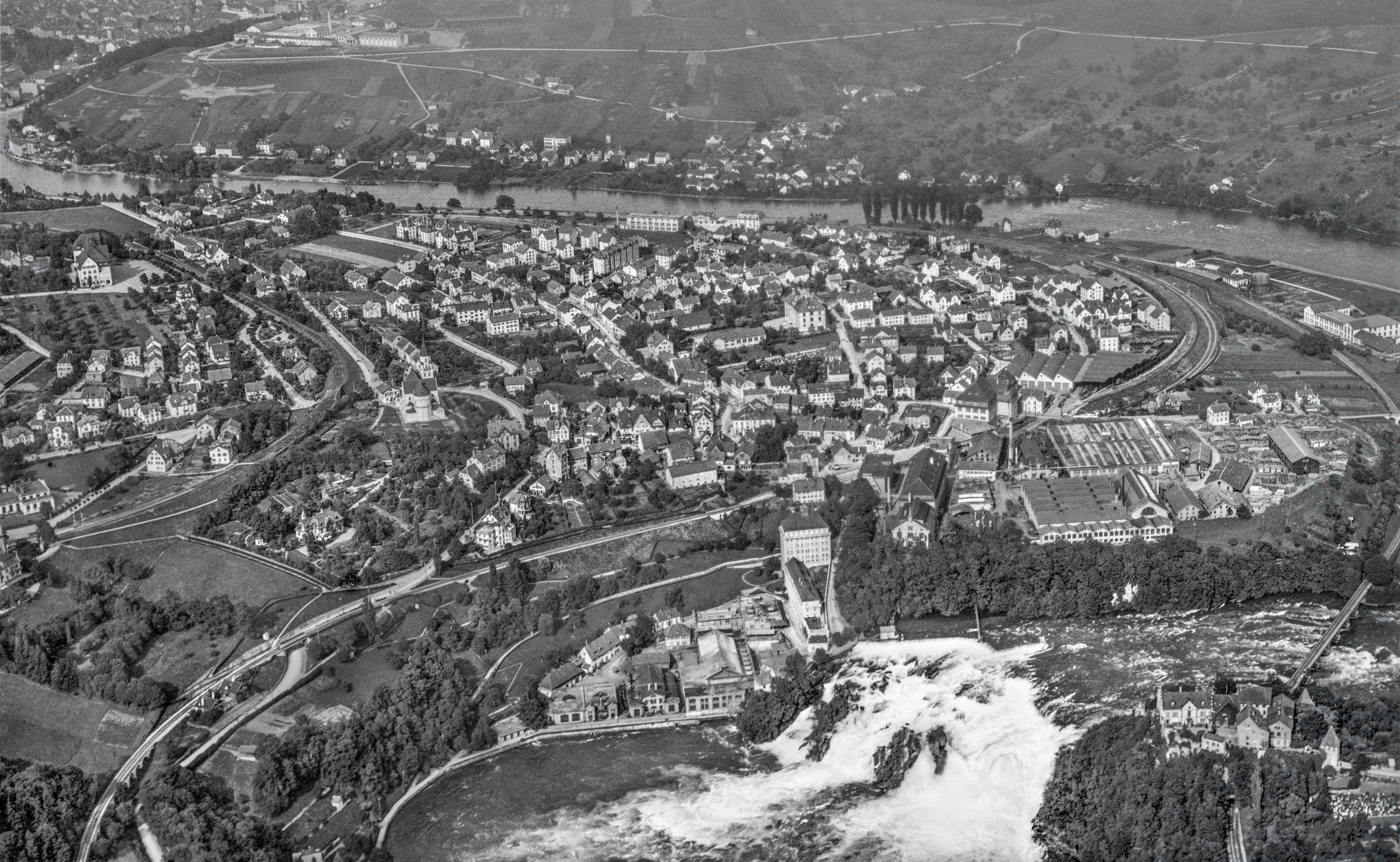
Aerial view by Walter Mittelholzer (1919)

Neuhausen am Rheinfall has an area, as of 2006, of 8.1 km^{2} (3.1 sq mi). Of this area, 14.5% is used for agricultural purposes, while 51.3% is forested. Of the rest of the land, 30.9% is settled (buildings or roads) and the remainder (3.2%) is non-productive (rivers or lakes).

The municipality is located in the Schaffhausen district. It used to be a haufendorf village (an irregular, unplanned and quite closely packed village, built around a central square) on the south foot of the Randen range near the Rhine Falls. Today it is an industrial city. Although it has seen recently also some post-industrial area development. It is located on the south-west border of the city of Schaffhausen. Until 1938 Neuhausen am Rheinfall was known as Neuhausen.

The neighboring municipalities are Laufen-Uhwiesen, Flurlingen, Feuerthalen, Schaffhausen, Beringen, Guntmadingen and the German municipality Jestetten, with which it has a border crossing along Zollstrasse to the southwest of town.

== Demographics ==
Neuhausen am Rheinfall has a population (as of 2008) of 10,080, of which 35.1% are foreign nationals. Of the foreign population, (as of 2008), 16.1% are from Germany, 16.2% are from Italy, 5.3% are from Croatia, 20.3% are from Serbia, 13.1% are from Macedonia, 6.5% are from Turkey, and 22.5% are from another country. Over the last 10 years the population has decreased at a rate of -3.6%. Most of the population (as of 2000) speaks German (81.2%), with Italian being second most common ( 4.3%) and Serbo-Croatian being third ( 4.3%).

The age distribution of the population (as of 2008) is children and teenagers (0–19 years old) make up 17.4% of the population, while adults (20–64 years old) make up 59.8% and seniors (over 64 years old) make up 22.7%.

In the 2007 federal election the most popular party was the Social Democratic Party which received 36.3% of the vote. The next two most popular parties were the Free Democratic Party (33.3%), and the Swiss People's Party (30.5%).

In Neuhausen am Rheinfall about 64.1% of the population (between age 25–64) have completed either non-mandatory upper secondary education or additional higher education (either university or a Fachhochschule). In Neuhausen am Rheinfall, as of 2007, 1.63% of the population attend kindergarten or another pre-school, 6.05% attend a Primary School, 2.62% attend a lower level Secondary School, and 2.49% attend a higher level Secondary School.

As of 2000, 27.3% of the population belonged to the Roman Catholic Church and 37.8% belonged to the Swiss Reformed Church.

The historical population is given in the following table:

year	population
1524	12 houses
around 1800	206
1850	922
1888	2,023
1900	3,905
1950	7,969
1970	12,103
2000	9,959

== Economy ==
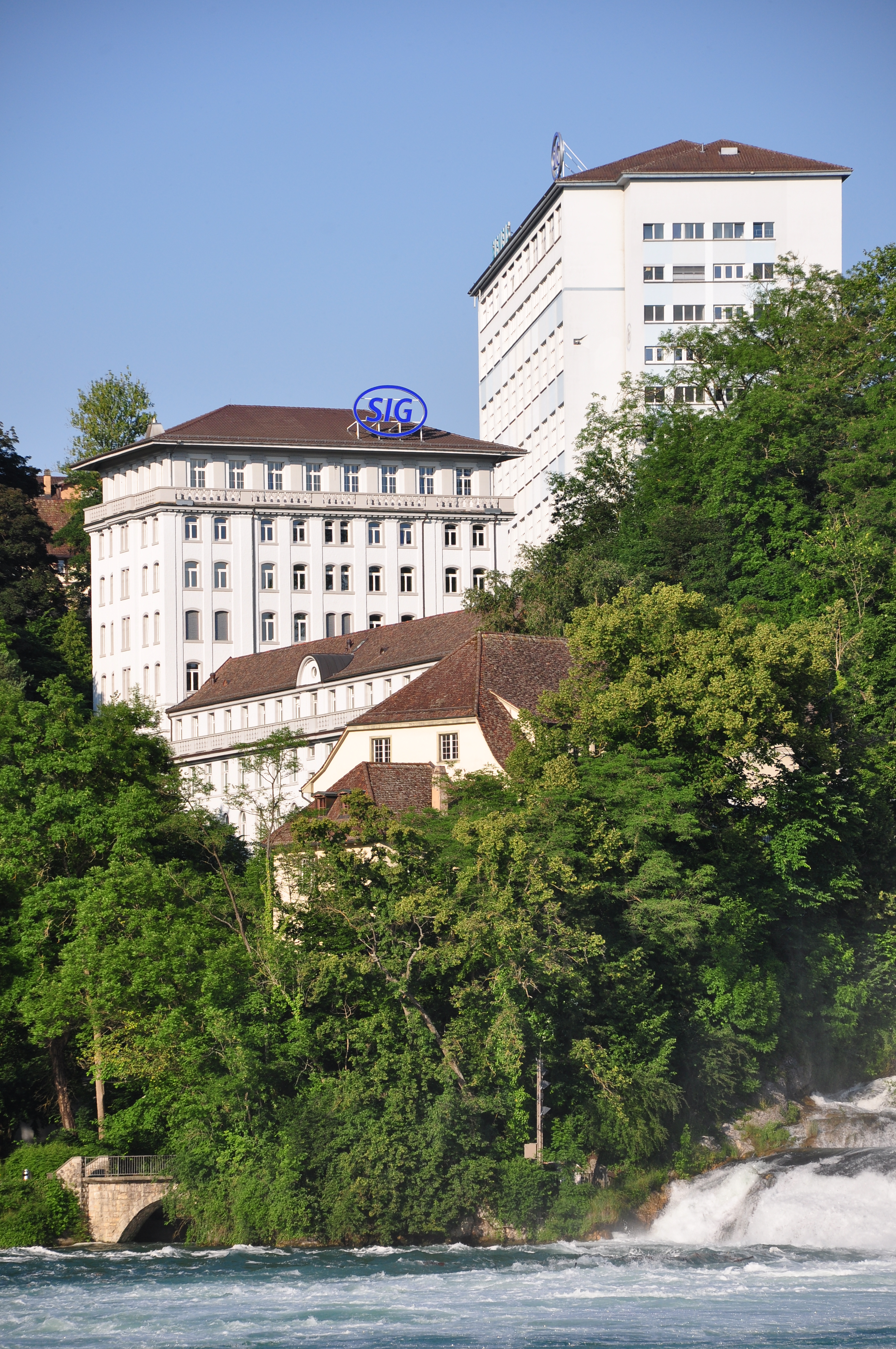
SIG headquarters in Neuhausen

Neuhausen am Rheinfall has an unemployment rate of 3.25%. As of 2005, there were 39 people employed in the primary economic sector and about 9 businesses involved in this sector. 1,664 people are employed in the secondary sector and there are 112 businesses in this sector. 3,082 people are employed in the tertiary sector, with 405 businesses in this sector.

As of 2008 the mid year average unemployment rate was 2.8%. There were 509 non-agrarian businesses in the municipality and 37.7% of the (non-agrarian) population was involved in the secondary sector of the economy while 62.3% were involved in the third. At the same time, 73.5% of the working population was employed full-time, and 26.5% was employed part-time. There were 5,313 residents of the municipality who were employed in some capacity, of which females made up 41.9% of the workforce. As of 2000 there were 1,428 residents who worked in the municipality, while 3,077 residents worked outside Neuhausen am Rheinfall and 2405 people commuted into the municipality for work.

As of 2008, there are 26 restaurants, and 3 hotels with 112 beds. The hospitality industry in Neuhausen am Rheinfall employs 185 people.

Neuhausen is home to a number of manufacturing firms. Some of the best-known are: The playing card company of AGM AGMüller, the cotton wool factory IVF Hartmann AG, the packaging company Schweizerische Industrie Gesellschaft (SIG) and the former Alusuisse factory, which is now part of the Alcan-Group.

== Transport ==
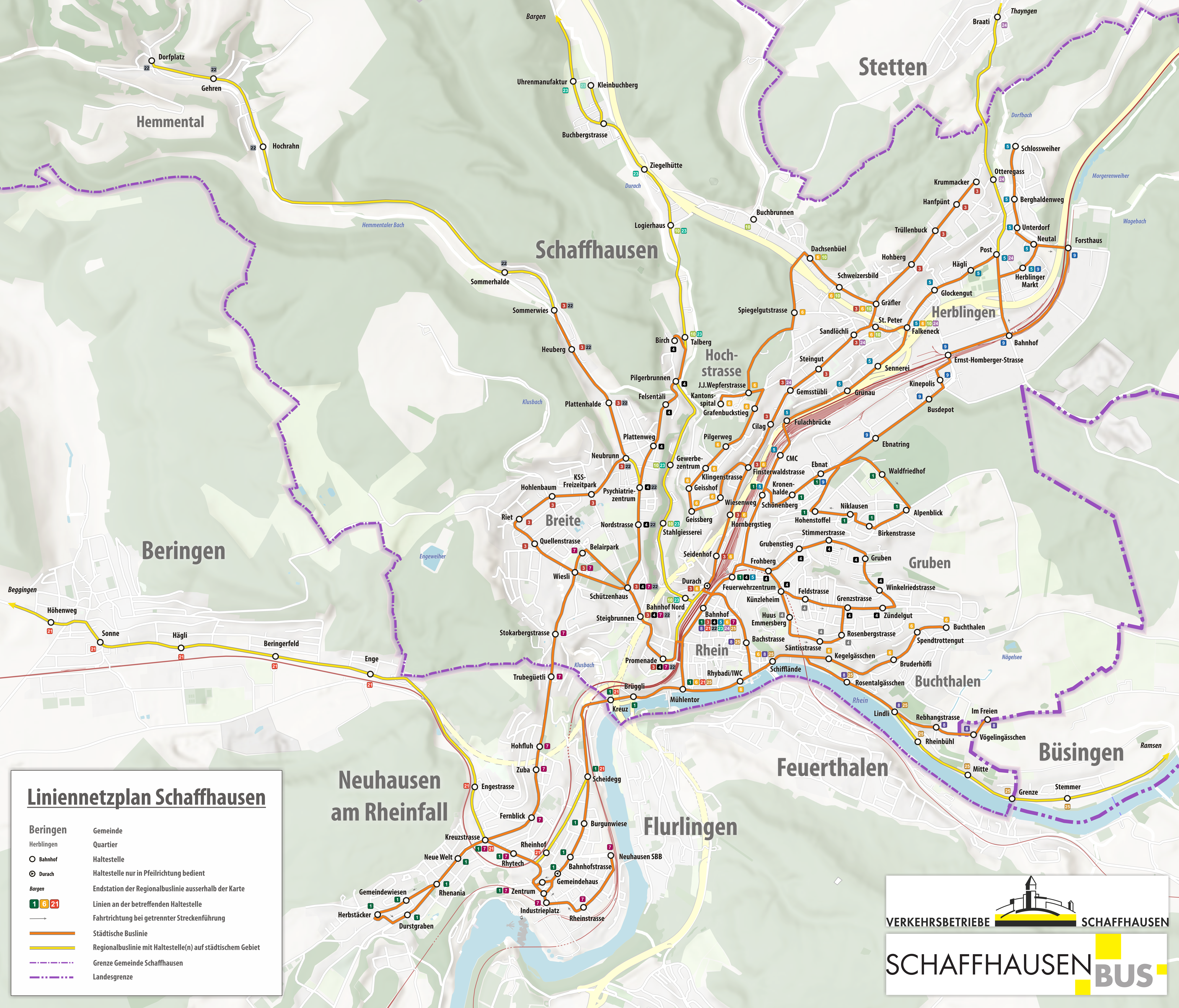
Urban bus routes of vbsh in the towns of Schaffhausen and Neuhausen am Rheinfall (as of December 2025)

=== Train ===
There are three railway stations within the municipality of Neuhausen am Rheinfall, all of which are only called at by S-Bahn-style services (long distance trains call only at Schaffhausen station). The three stations of Neuhausen are:

- Neuhausen located in the East of the town next to the Rhine, on the Rheinfall Line
  - S9 of Zurich S-Bahn: hourly service between Uster and Schaffhausen (via Bülach and Zürich HB)
  - S12 of Zurich S-Bahn: hourly service between Brugg AG and Schaffhausen (via Winterthur and Zürich HB)
  - S24 Zurich S-Bahn: hourly service between Thayngen and Zug (via Zürich Airport)
  - S33 Zurich S-Bahn: hourly service between Winterthur and Schaffhausen
  - S65 of Schaffhausen S-Bahn: hourly service between Jestetten and Schaffhausen
- Neuhausen Rheinfall situated on the northern bank of the Rhine Falls, on the Eglisau–Neuhausen Line
  - S9 of Zurich S-Bahn: hourly service between Uster and Schaffhausen (via Bülach and Zürich HB)
  - S65 of Schaffhausen S-Bahn: hourly service between Jestetten and Schaffhausen
- Neuhausen Badischer Bahnhof located in the upper part of the town, on the High Rhine Railway.
  - S64 of Schaffhausen S-Bahn: half-hourly service between Erzingen (Baden) and Schaffhausen

=== Bus ===
Neuhausen am Rheinfall shares a municipal bus network with the adjacent town of Schaffhausen. Buses run every 10 to 20 minutes and are operated by Verkehrsbetriebe Schaffhausen (vbsh). The following urban bus lines call at bus stops in the municipality of Neuhausen (in italics for emphasis):

Line	Route
1	Herbstäcker – Gemeindewiesen/Durstgraben – Rhenania – Neue Welt – Kreuzstrasse – Rhytech – Neuhausen Zentrum – Gemeindehaus – Bahnhofstrasse – Burgunwiese – Scheidegg – Kreuz – Bahnhof SH – Ebnat – Waldfriedhof
7	Neuhausen SBB – Rheinstrasse – Industrieplatz – Neuhausen Zentrum – Rhytech – Kreuzstrasse – Fernblick – Zuba – Hohfluh – Trubegüetli – Schützenhaus – Bahnhof SH

Line 1 (and previously also lines 2 and 9) was until December 2025 operated by trolleybuses, but since the closure of the Schaffhausen trolleybus system, line 1 and line 7 are both operated by diesel-powered buses or battery-powered buses. Neuhausen SBB, the southern terminus of line 7, is right next to Neuhausen railway station. Neuhausen, Zentrum and Neuhausen, Industrieplatz are both close to Neuhausen Rheinfall railway station. Neuhausen Badischer Bahnhof railway station is situated in between bus stations Neuhausen, Kreuzstrasse and Neuhausen, Neue Welt (within walking distance to both of these bus stops).

There is also a regional bus route (line 21, half-hourly service) passing through the municipality of Neuhausen am Rheinfall, which is also operated by vbsh. Route 21 is as follows (bus stops in Neuhausen in italics):

Line	Route
21	Bahnhof SH – Kreuz – Scheidegg – Rheinhof – Kreuzstrasse – Engestrasse – Beringen – Löhningen – Siblingen – Schleitheim – Beggingen

== Cultural Heritage ==
=== Wörth Castle ===
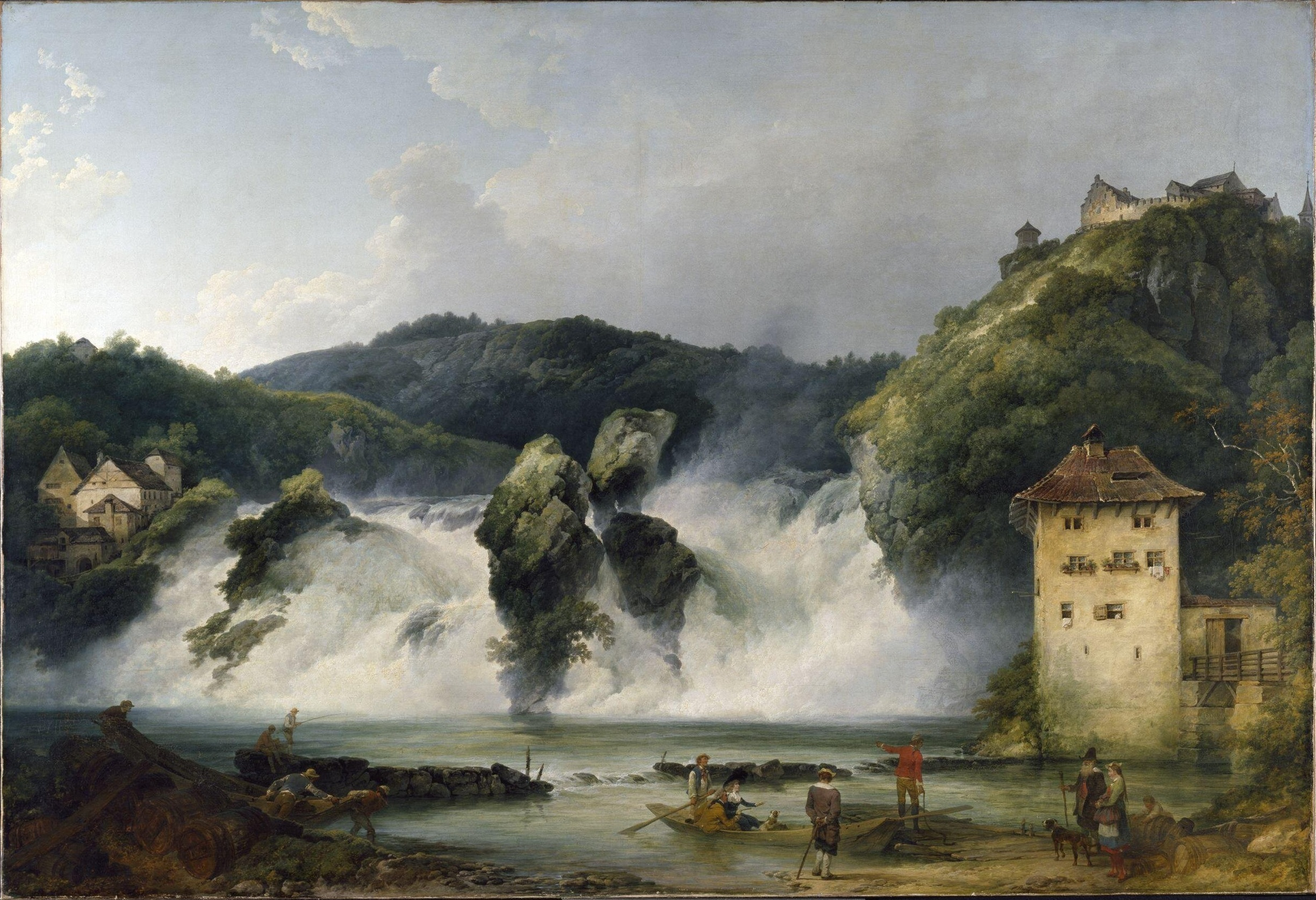
The Falls of the Rhine at Schaffhausen by Philip James de Loutherbourg, 1788.

The Wörth Castle owes its name to the location on a small island, washed by the water of the Rheinfall, which used to be known as Werd, meaning literally a river island. Wörth was first mentioned in the 13th century AD, serving up to the middle of the 19th century as a major transhipment point on the east–west trade route, that led from Lake Constance and Basel, and was interrupted by the Rheinfall waterfalls. When the railway was built, the water traffic route lost its importance, and the Canton of Schaffhausen rebuilt the building as a restaurant in 1835/36.

=== Heritage sites of national significance ===
The house Villa Charlottenfels at Charlottenweg 2 is listed as a Swiss heritage site of national significance. Villa Charlottenfels was built in 1850-54 as a Renaissance Revival castle-like building. Originally built to house a factory, it features wide terraces with covered arcades and pavilions. The southern pavilion contains a mural by Hans Bendel which has a Swiss history theme.

== Notable people ==
- Arthur Rich (1910-1992), theologian, social and business ethics
- Willy Bührer (1912 – 1990 in Neuhausen), a Swiss athlete, competed in the men's decathlon at the 1936 Summer Olympics
- Dölf Wild (born 1954 in Neuhausen), a Swiss historian, archaeologist, science writer and chief archaeologist of Zürich
- Thomas Minder (born 1960), a Swiss entrepreneur and politician, brought up and lives in Neuhausen
