= Jestetten =

- Municipality
- Coat of arms

- Location of Jestetten within Waldshut district
- Interactive map of Jestetten
- Location within Germany Location within Baden-Württemberg
- Coordinates: 47°39′08″N 08°34′15″E
- Country: Germany
- State: Baden-Württemberg
- Admin. region: Freiburg
- District: Waldshut

Government
  - Mayor (2021–29): Dominic Böhler

Area
  - Total: 20.63 km^{2} (7.97 sq mi)
- Elevation: 436 m (1,430 ft)

Population (2025-12-31)
  - Total: 5,340
  - Density: 259/km^{2} (670/sq mi)
- Time zone: UTC+01:00 (CET)
  - Summer (DST): UTC+02:00 (CEST)
- Postal codes: 79798
- Dialling codes: 07745
- Vehicle registration: WT
- Website: www.jestetten.de

Jestetten is a municipality in the district of Waldshut in the far south of Baden-Württemberg, Germany, on the border with Switzerland. It is situated between the Bülach District of the Canton of Zurich, Switzerland, and the Klettgau municipality of Baden-Württemberg. In 1973, it was united with the adjacent village of Altenburg.

The municipality is on the High Rhine stretch of the River Rhine, about 6 km downstream of the Rhine Falls. Here, the Rhine doubles back on itself, forming two interconnected peninsulas. Between them is the small, sheltered river island where Rheinau Abbey was founded in 778. The eastern peninsula is called the Schwaben and belongs to Jestetten; the western peninsula is called the Au or Rheinau.

Jestetten, together with the municipalities of Dettighofen and Lottstetten, forms the so-called "Jestettenzipfel." The area is surrounded by a 55-km-long stretch of the border with Switzerland and can be reached directly from Germany only by a single road.

== History ==
=== Bronze Age ===
The oldest traces of humans in the immediate vicinity date to the Bronze Age. Firewood from the Middle Bronze Age has been found at nearby Schnellgalge, and artifacts from the Linear Pottery culture found near Altenburg date from the Late Bronze Age. In the latter period, the Rhine floodplain was first enclosed by a rampart, and around the same time an Urnfield culture village stood in the Sinkelosebuck near Altenburg and was inhabited until the Middle La Tène period.

=== Iron Age ===
In the late second century BC during La Tène II, an 800-m rampart with a ditch, known as the “Schanz,” was built east of modern-day Altenburg. Then, 60 m to the immediate south, an oppidum was built on 233 ha. The settlement, now known as Altenburg-Rheinau [als], was a center of trade that not only minted coins but, based on the slag and semi-finished products found there, also processed bronze.

In the mid-1st century BC during La Tène III, a new rampart was built over the Bronze Age one near Rheinau, extending the protected area to 321 ha. This double oppidum likely belonged to the Helvetii tribe and was one of the largest late Celtic oppida. Because it controlled the Rhine crossing, it was a critical trading post.

About 100 m southeast of the Schanz is a gravel pit containing several dozen smaller pits, which have undergone excavation since the 1930s. These include pottery kilns. In the mid-20th century the pits yielded bronze and iron fibulae, including six variations on the Nauheim style in which the bow widens into a flat triangle or diamond. Archaeologists also found tools, harness gear, bronze vessels, a bronze balance likely used to weigh coins, Italian amphorae, and a variety of other ceramic vessels at the oppidum.

In 2022–2023, excavations by the Baden-Württemberg State Office for the Preservation of Monuments turned up backfilled cylindrical pits up to 2.5 m deep whose linings contained organic material, suggesting that these pits was used for food storage. Also found were a bone stylus for use with wax tablets, shards of amphorae that had contained imported wine, many Celtic coins, local pottery, and "ornately decorated" accessories such as fibulae and parts of belts.

In 2026, an analysis of soil from the food storage pits found numerous seeds, fruit remains, and charcoal fragments. Barley (H. vulgare) was present in 67% of samples, both spelt (T. spelta) and proso millet (P. miliaceum) in 50%. Also found were common and durum wheat as well as einkorn in lesser amounts. The oppidum's inhabitants largely lived on these crops, supplementing their diets with wild hazelnuts (C. avellana; found in 42% of samples) and sloe plums (P. cf. spinosa). They also ate plants that would be considered weeds today, like black bindweed (P. convolvulus) or spurrey (S. arvensis), seeds of which have previously been found in Iron Age bog bodies.

Weeds such as brome (B. secalinus) and cleavers (G. aparine) that were found mixed in with the grains in certain pits typically grow alongside winter crops (e.g., spelt), while other of the discovered weeds correlate with summer crops (e.g., barley, millet). This shows that Altenburg-Rheinau planted crops for different seasons. Also part of the archaeobotanical mix were fodder plants such as clovers (Trifolium sp.) and alfalfa (Medicago), suggesting that the local Helvetii practiced "fallow with grazing." In this crop rotation system, fields were left to rest for a few years while livestock fed on their plants and fertilized them with their manure.

The pits had been burned to rid them of pests and fungi, a common ancient practice. The charcoal used in this process was mainly made from oak (Quercus sp.; 55% of samples) and, to a lesser extent, beech (F. sylvatica; 27% of samples). Both types of wood burn slowly, produce great heat, and were plentiful in the vicinity. Charcoal fragments from other species (fir, alder, hazel, maple) were found in very small amounts. After burning, the pits were used as rubbish dumps.

=== Roman era ===
Altenburg-Rheinau was abandoned in 16–15 BC. No significant numbers of weapons have been found at the oppidum, nor any other evidence that it was destroyed in battle. However, its abandonment was concurrent with the Alpine campaign of Tiberius and his brother Nero Claudius Drusus, a war that brought modern-day Switzerland under Roman control and ultimately incorporated the Helvetii into the Roman Empire. This raises the possibility that Altenburg-Rheinau was evacuated either ahead of the Romans or by Roman order.

In the Roman era, the area around the two peninsulas was sparsely populated. A Roman military camp was established near modern-day Dangstetten about 25 km to the southwest shortly after the Alpine campaign, but it lasted for only a few years. The Alemanni did not settle in the area until later centuries.

=== Middle Ages ===
Rheinau Abbey is said to have been founded on the island in the Rhine about 778, and Jestetten and Altenburg were first mentioned in documents in 871 AD. In the 9th century the abbey housed a community of 43 people, about half of whom were ordained priests. St. Fintan of Rheinau, an Irish nobleman and warrior who escaped his Viking enslavers, later became a monk and spent his last 22 years at the abbey as an immured recluse. In 1049, Jestetten was a "heathland town." In 1126, Count Rudolf of Lenzburg founded the adjoining settlement of Rheinau. Jestetten Castle [de] first appeared in written documents in 1135.

In these centuries, like many other monasteries, Rheinau Abbey alternated between enjoying generous endowments and privileges from the Holy Roman Emperors and suffering oppression and fraud from theVögte (advocates). Against the increasingly aggressive territorial claims of the Counts of Sulz, the abbey made a treaty in 1455 with the Old Swiss Confederacy, which was intended to protect it against further attacks by the noble families of the Klettgau.

=== Early Modern era ===
Rheinau Abbey was abandoned in 1529–31 in the wake of the Reformation, but was re-established the following year and became a bastion of the Counter-Reformation. The master organ builder Daniel Hayl the elder built a pipe organ there in the years 1592–1594. In the 18th century Abbot Gerold II Zurlauben rebuilt the monastic complex in the Baroque style; Franz Beer worked on the abbey church, which was rededicated in 1710. The abbey was abandoned again during the French Revolution and France's 1798 invasion of Switzerland, but resumed operation in 1803. Its territory in Rheinau was added to the newly restored Canton of Zürich, which placed it under cantonal supervision in 1834. In 1862, the Cantonal Council decreed the abbey to be dissolved. From 1603 until its dissolution it belonged to the Swiss Congregation, now part of the Benedictine Confederation.

=== 19th and 20th centuries ===
In 1806, Jestetten became part of the Grand Duchy of Baden. Due to the complexity of the border with Switzerland, from 1840 until 1935 the Jestettenzipfel was a customs exclusion zone separate from the German customs area. This enabled inhabitants to offer their produce to the rest of Germany as well as to Switzerland, which raised their standard of living and prosperity relative to the rest of Germany. In 1897, the Jestetten station on the Eglisau-Schaffhausen railway line opened.

Jestetten in Waldshut district

== Geography ==
The border crossing into Switzerland is located to the east of town along Schaffhauserstraße leading to Neuhausen am Rheinfall. Another border crossing in the municipality is located south west of town along Osterfingerstraße, towards the villager of Osterfingen in Wilchingen, Schaffhausen Canton.

== Transport ==
Jestetten railway station is situated on the Swiss Federal Railway's cross-border Eglisau-Neuhausen railway line and is served by Zurich S-Bahn line S9. As a border station, it lies is in local transport tariff zones in both Germany and Switzerland.

Jestetten is one of only two Swiss-operated stations located entirely within Germany, the other being Lottstetten. Until December 2010 a third station was in operation, namely Altenburg-Rheinau in Altenburg, close to the border with Neuhausen am Rheinfall, Despite protests from the German authorities, however, Switzerland closed the station due to low passenger numbers.

None of the lines running to or through Jestetten have a direct rail connection to the German railway network.

Trains that pass through Jestetten without stopping at any of the stations on the line in Germany are not subject to any customs formalities or restrictions by either country, despite the train and its passengers technically leaving the Swiss Customs Area, entering the European Union customs area, and then entering Swiss customs territory again. An agreement in this respect was entered into by the two countries and became law in 1936.

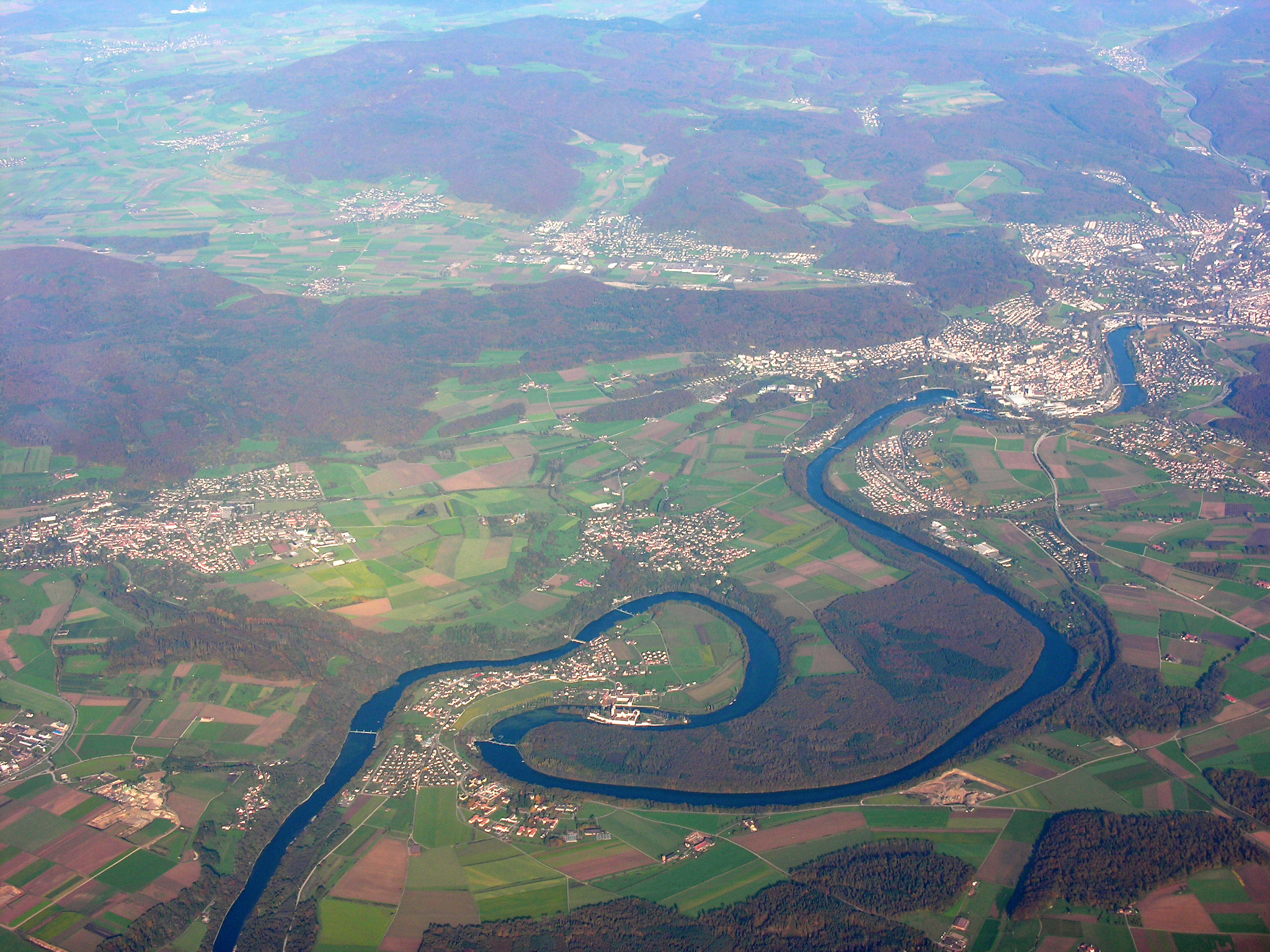
Aerial view with Rhine and Jestetten in the centre on the left
