= Eglisau–Neuhausen line =

Swiss railway line that crosses part of Germany

Eglisau–Neuhausen
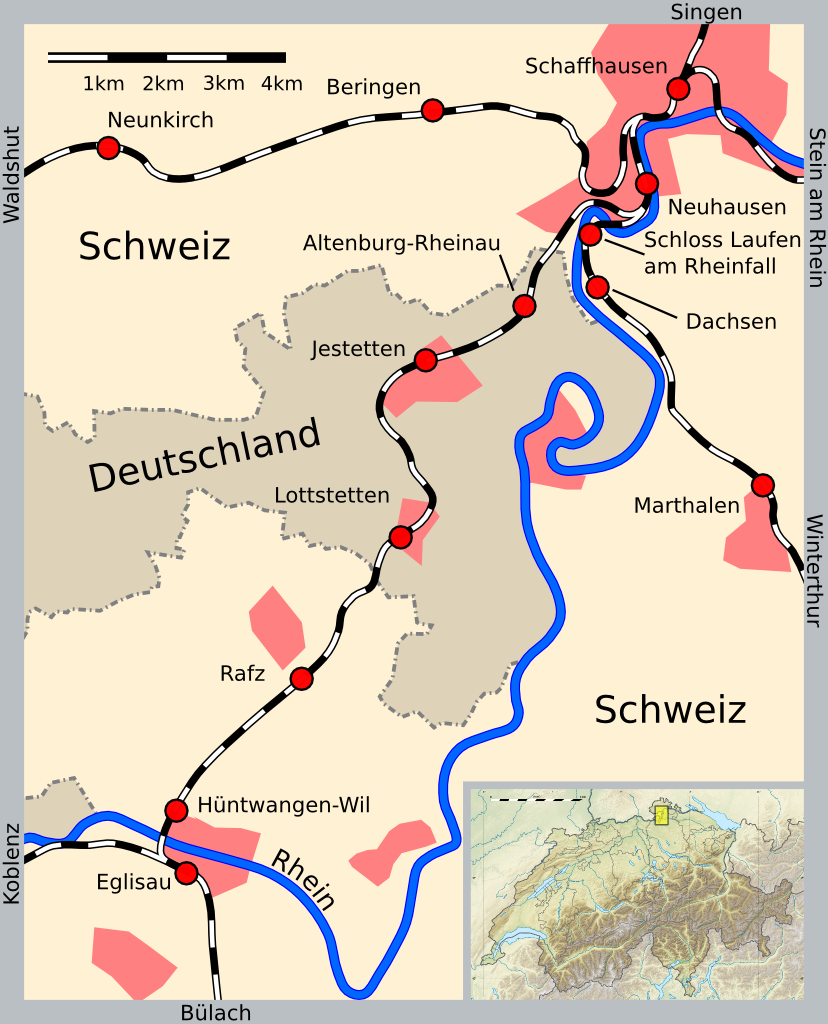

Service
- System: Swiss Federal Railways

History
- Opened: 1897

Technical
- Line length: 17.88 kilometres (11.11 mi)
- Track gauge: 1,435 mm (4 ft 8 1/2 in) standard gauge
- Electrification: Overhead line: 15 kV 16.7 Hz AC
- Maximum incline: 1.3 %

The Eglisau–Neuhausen line is a cross-border railway in Germany and Switzerland. It links Eglisau in the Swiss canton of Zurich with the city of Schaffhausen in the Swiss canton of Schaffhausen, crossing some 8 kilometres (5 mi) of the German state of Baden-Württemberg in between. It thus crosses the Germany–Switzerland border twice. The line is 17.88 kilometres (11.11 mi) long, standard gauge and electrified at 15 kV 16.7 Hz AC supplied by overhead line. It is formed of a mixture of single and double track sections.

== History ==
Schaffhausen was first connected to the Swiss railway system in 1857 with the opening of the Rheinfall Railway. Whilst this line was entirely on Swiss soil, and provided a direct link to the city of Winterthur, it only provided a rather indirect route to the rest of Switzerland and the Gotthard Railway. The Swiss Northeastern Railway therefore constructed the Eglisau to Neuhausen line, which opened in 1897. The construction of the line involved the building of several civil engineering structures, including the 439 metres (1,440 ft) Eglisau railway bridge across the Rhine at the southern end of the line. At the northern end of the line, two tunnels were necessary, with lengths of 112 metres (367 ft) and 144 metres (472 ft).

== Route ==
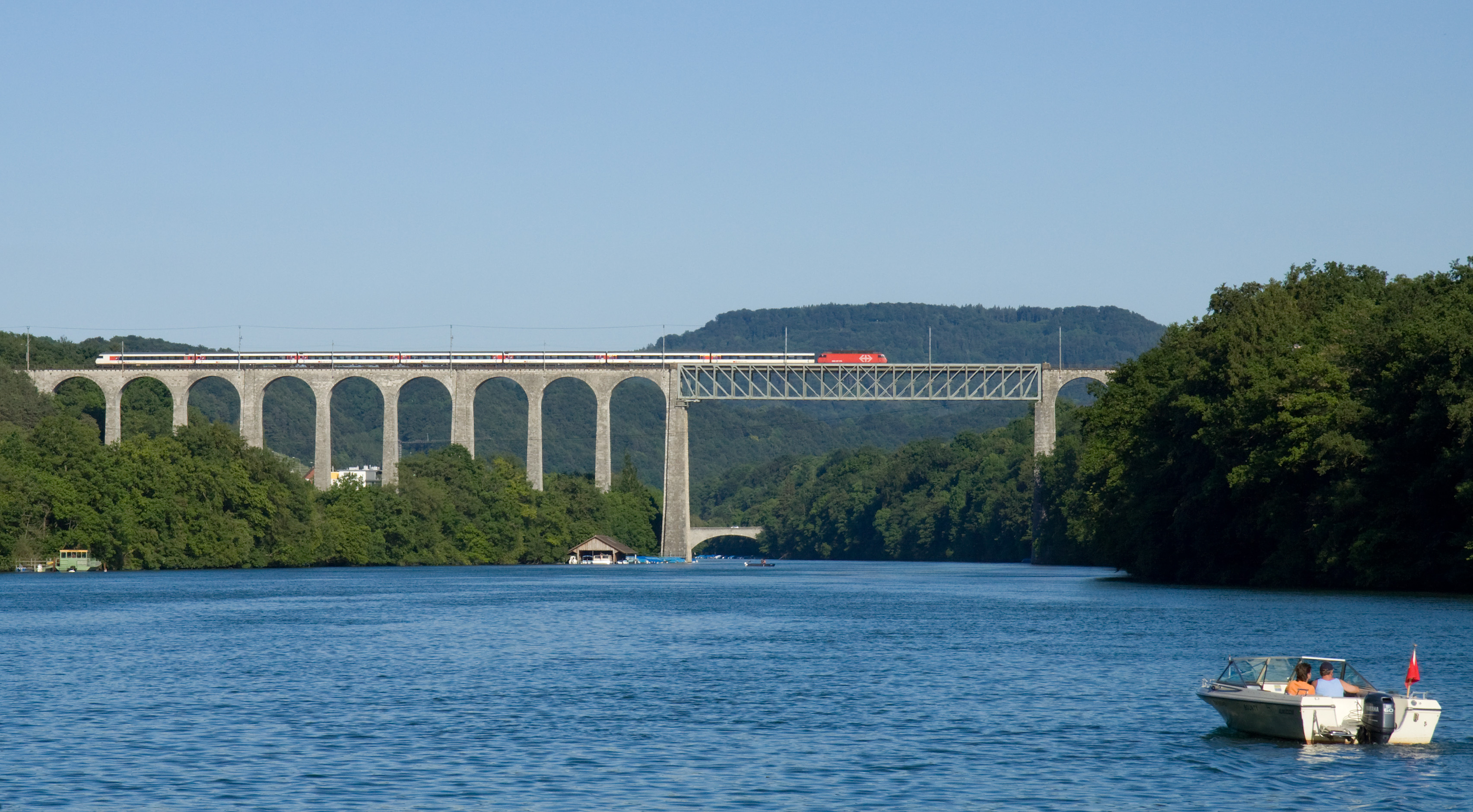
The Eglisau railway bridge carries the Eglisau–Neuhausen line across the Rhine

The line commences at a junction with the Winterthur to Koblenz line immediately to the west of Eglisau station. From the junction the single-track line turns north and crosses the Rhine on the Eglisau railway bridge before reaching Hüntwangen-Wil station. Although now north of the Rhine, the line at this stage is still in Switzerland and the canton of Zürich. Between Hüntwangen-Wil and the following Rafz station the line is double track, and also connects to freight only spurs serving quarries to the west of the line. After Rafz the line returns to single track before crossing the border into Germany.

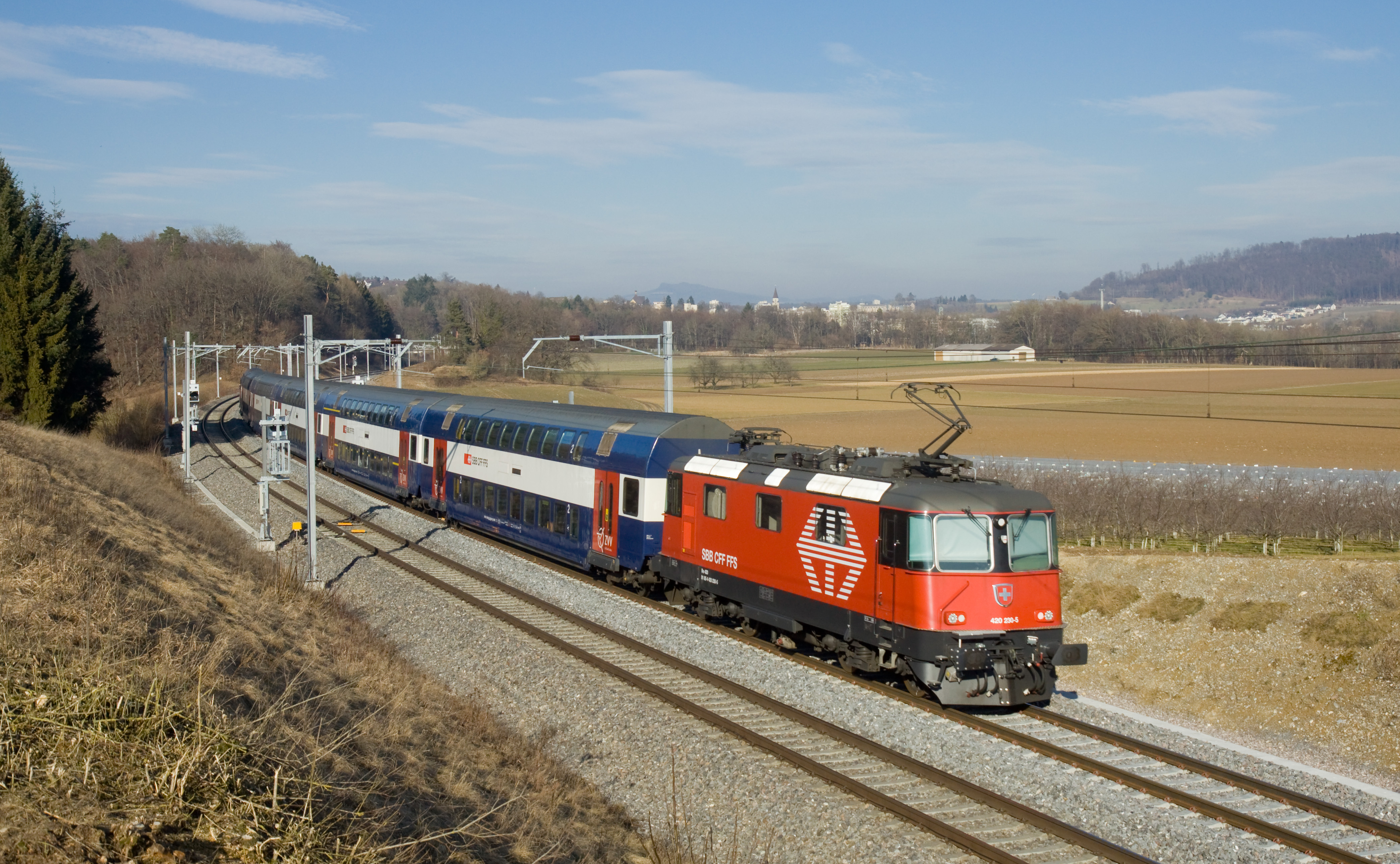
Peak hour train between Jestetten and Neuhausen

Lottstetten station is the first station in Germany, followed by Jestetten station. Roughly half-way between the two stations, the line again becomes double-track again. After leaving Jetstetten the line passes through the site of the former Altenburg-Rheinau station, which was closed in 2010 because of low passenger numbers and despite protests from the German authorities.

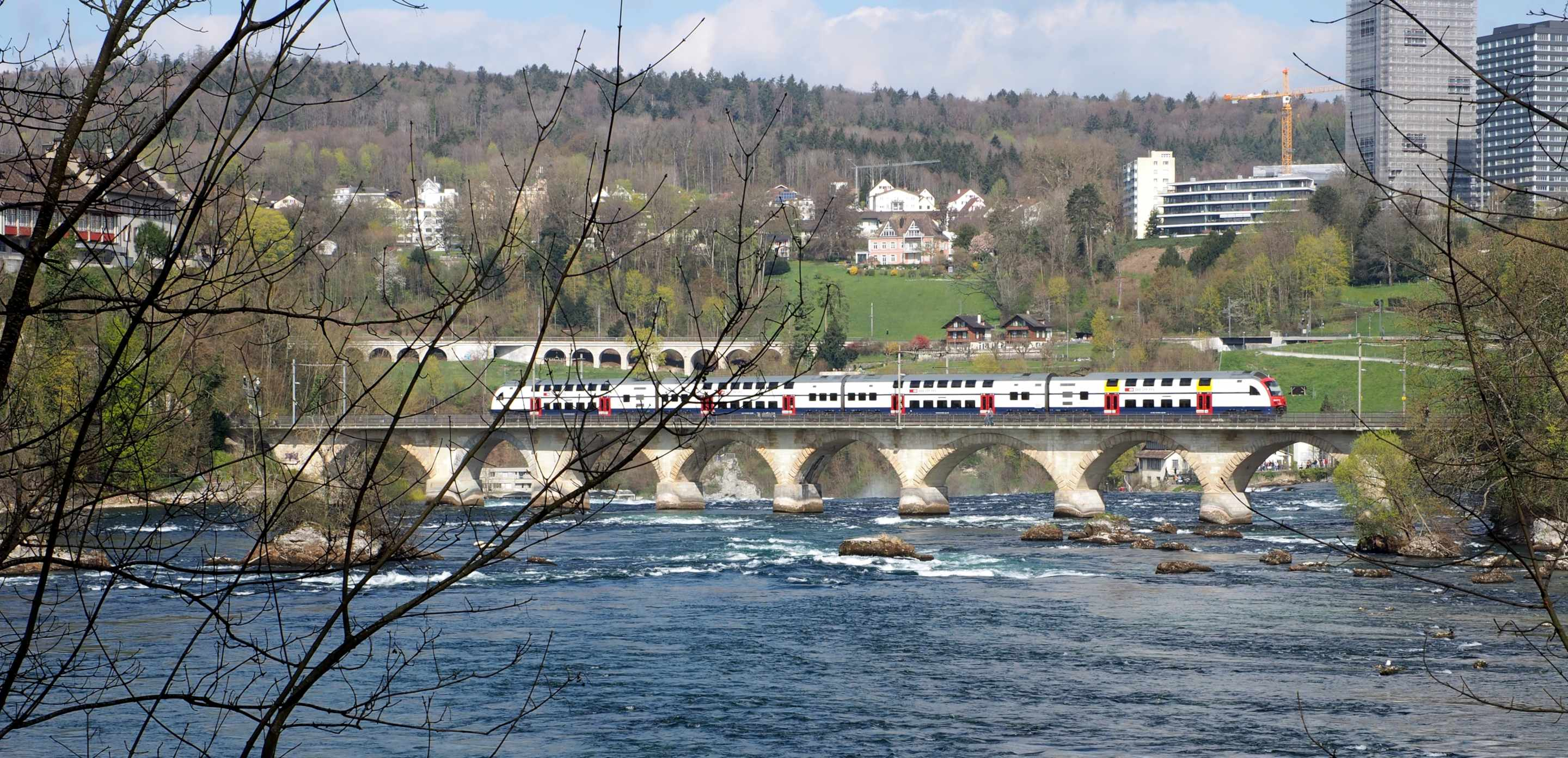
The Eglisau–Neuhausen line in background and the Rheinfall line with a train

Shortly after the site of Altenburg-Rheinau station, the line passes back into Switzerland, although this time in the canton of Schaffhausen, and reverts to single track again. After passing through the Fischerhölzli tunnel, the line emerges high on the hillside above the Rhine and the famous Rhine Falls. On this stretch of line lies the Neuhausen Rheinfall station, which was opened in 2015 and is linked to the area around the falls by a combination of bridges and lifts.

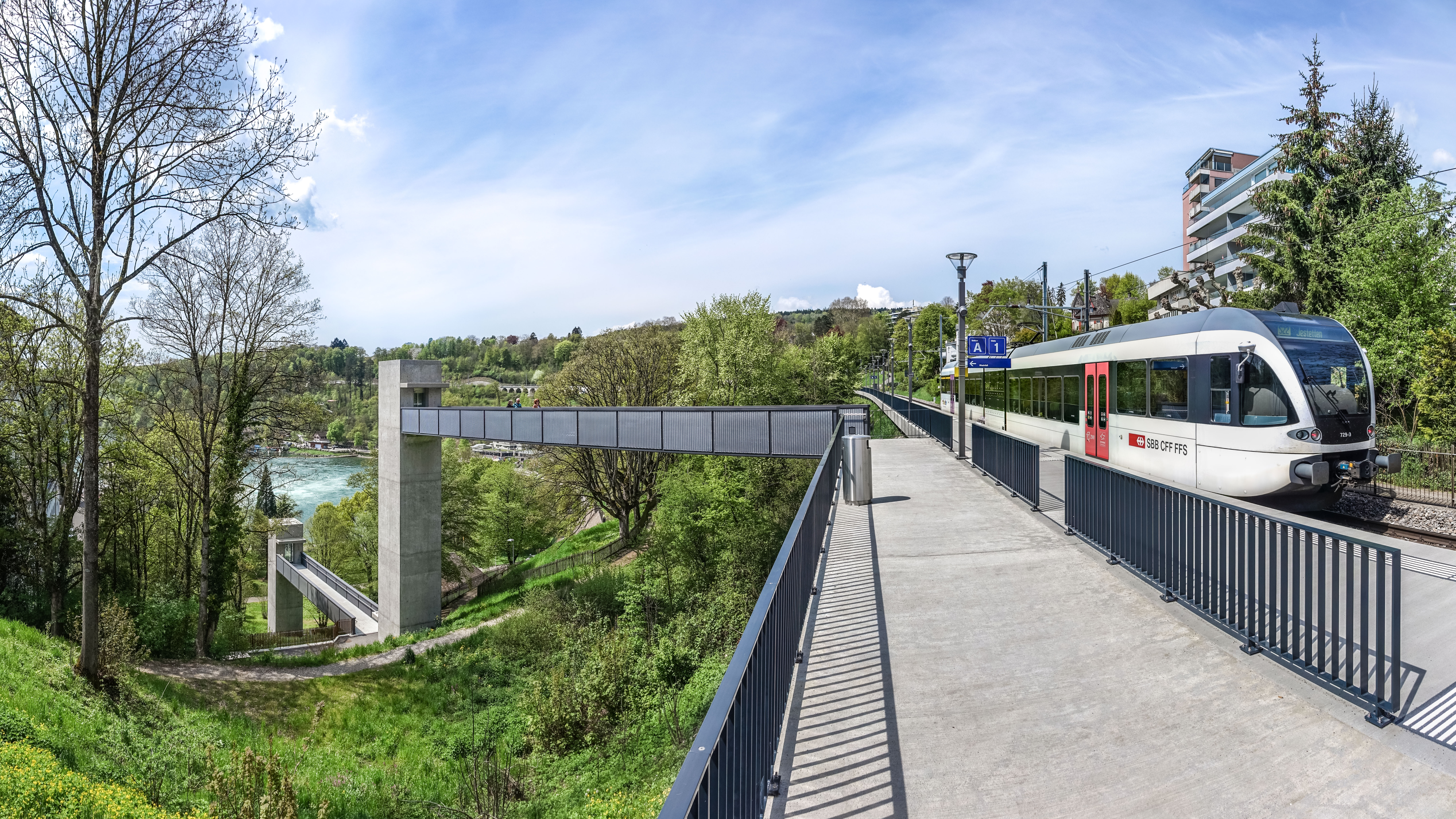
Neuhausen Rheinfall station, showing lift to the falls

After Neuhausen Rheinfall station, the line passes through the Neuhausen tunnel, running under the former railway rolling stock factory of Schweizerische Industrie Gesellschaft (SIG). It then joins the Rheinfall line, which links Winterthur with Schaffhausen, immediately before Neuhausen's main station.

== Train services ==
The line carries an hourly service of long-distance passenger trains between Zürich and Schaffhausen, with some trains operating as far as Frankfurt and Bern. Trains on the Zurich S-Bahn line S9 operate half-hourly from Zurich as far as Rafz (just before the German border), with alternate trains continuing to Schaffhausen. Schaffhausen S-Bahn line provides a local service from Jestetten to Schaffhausen. Freight trains also use the line between Germany and the Gotthard route.

== Cross-border operation ==
The whole line, including the section in Germany, now belongs to the Swiss Federal Railways, and is subject to Swiss rail regulations and Swiss domestic rail fares. The section of the line running through German territory has no rail connection to the German railway network other than by passing through the sections of the line that are in Switzerland. Jestetten and Lottstetten are border stations and as such are in local transport tariff zones in both Germany and Switzerland.

Trains which pass through German territory without stopping at a German station, are not subject to any customs inspection or restrictions of either country, despite the train and its passengers technically leaving the Swiss customs area, entering the European Union customs area and reentering Swiss territory again. An agreement in this respect was entered into by the two countries and became law in 1936. From 1840 until 1935, Lottstetten, Altenburg, Jestetten and what was then Dettighofen, was part of the region which formed a customs exclusion zone and was not part of the German customs area.

== Accidents and incidents ==
On 20 February 2015, at approximately 6.43 am, a collision occurred between an Interregio train and an S-Bahn train at Rafz. The collision occurred as the Interregio train, which was running late, was passing through Rafz without stopping. The S-Bahn train was departing for Jestetten and was involved in a sideswipe collision, with the Interregio train coming from behind the S-Bahn train. The express was partially derailed, but the couplings held and no carriages overturned. The S-Bahn train was operated by Class 514 electric multiple unit 514 046-2. The InterRegio train was hauled by Class 460 electric locomotive No. 460 087-0.

== Future ==
In 2021, the Swiss Federal Railways announced plans to double the track between Jestetten and Rafz, thus introducing a second track and platform in Lottstetten station. This will facilitate the planned introduction of a day-long half-hourly S-Bahn service between Zürich and Schaffhausen by 2029. The augmented capacity would also make it possible for an increased number of goods trains to utilise the route.
