= Dettighofen, Baden-Württemberg =

Dettighofen
- Municipality
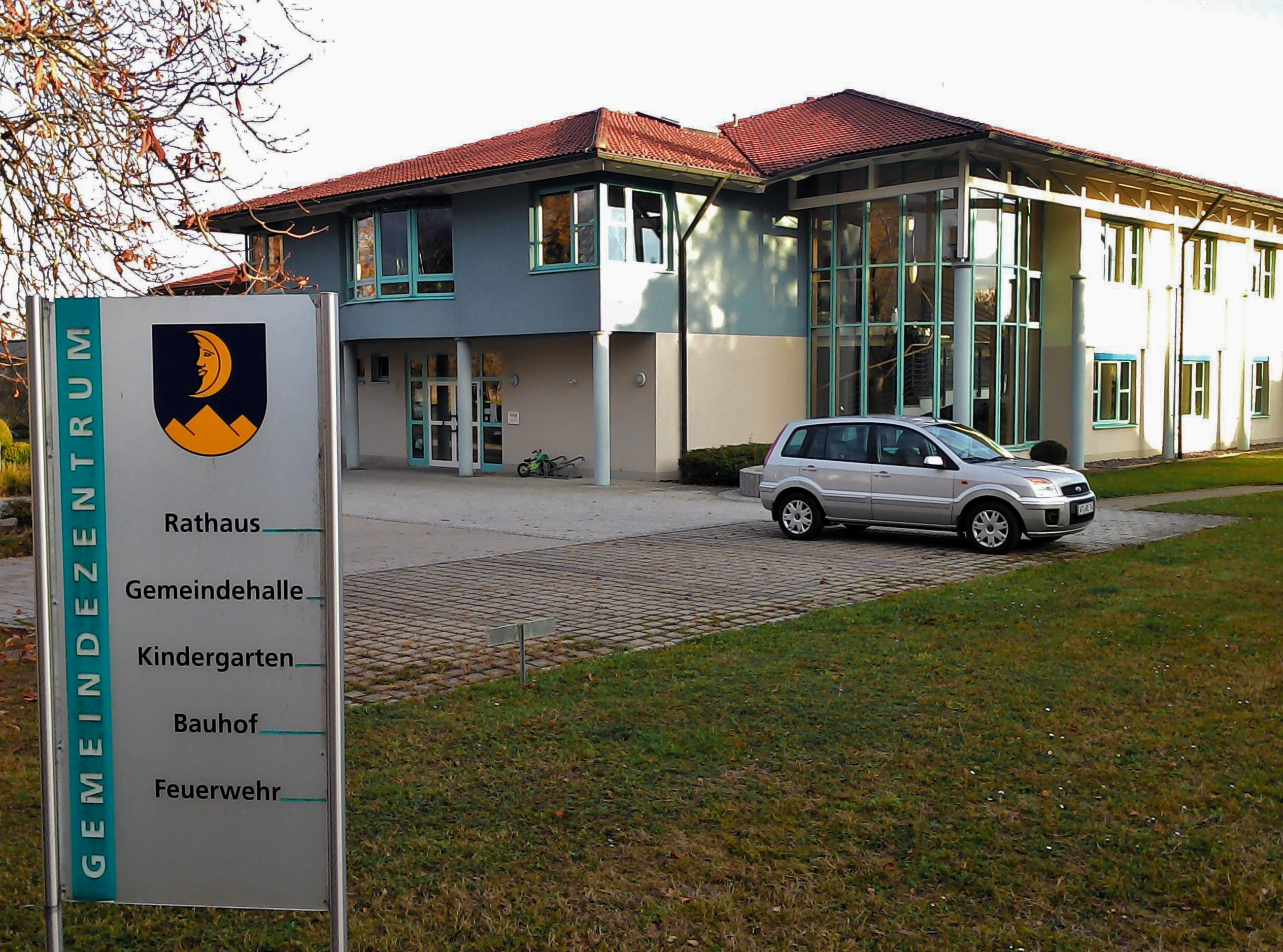
- Town hall

- Coat of arms

- Location of Dettighofen within Waldshut district
- Interactive map of Dettighofen
- Location within Germany Location within Baden-Württemberg
- Coordinates: 47°37′26″N 08°29′01″E
- Country: Germany
- State: Baden-Württemberg
- Admin. region: Freiburg
- District: Waldshut

Government
  - Mayor (2022–30): Marion Frei

Area
  - Total: 14.38 km^{2} (5.55 sq mi)
- Elevation: 488 m (1,601 ft)

Population (2025-12-31)
  - Total: 1,112
  - Density: 77.33/km^{2} (200.3/sq mi)
- Time zone: UTC+01:00 (CET)
  - Summer (DST): UTC+02:00 (CEST)
- Postal codes: 79802
- Dialling codes: 07742
- Vehicle registration: WT

Dettighofen (German pronunciation: [dɛtɪçˈhoːfn̩]) is a village and municipality in the district of Waldshut in Baden-Württemberg in Germany.

== History ==
From 1840 until 1935, the original territory of Dettighofen, along with Jestetten, Lottstetten and Altenburg, was part of the region which formed a customs exclusion zone and was not part of the German customs area. Inhabitants were able to offer their produce to the rest of Germany as well as to Switzerland. This situation brought about a higher standard of living and prosperity compared to the rest of Germany.

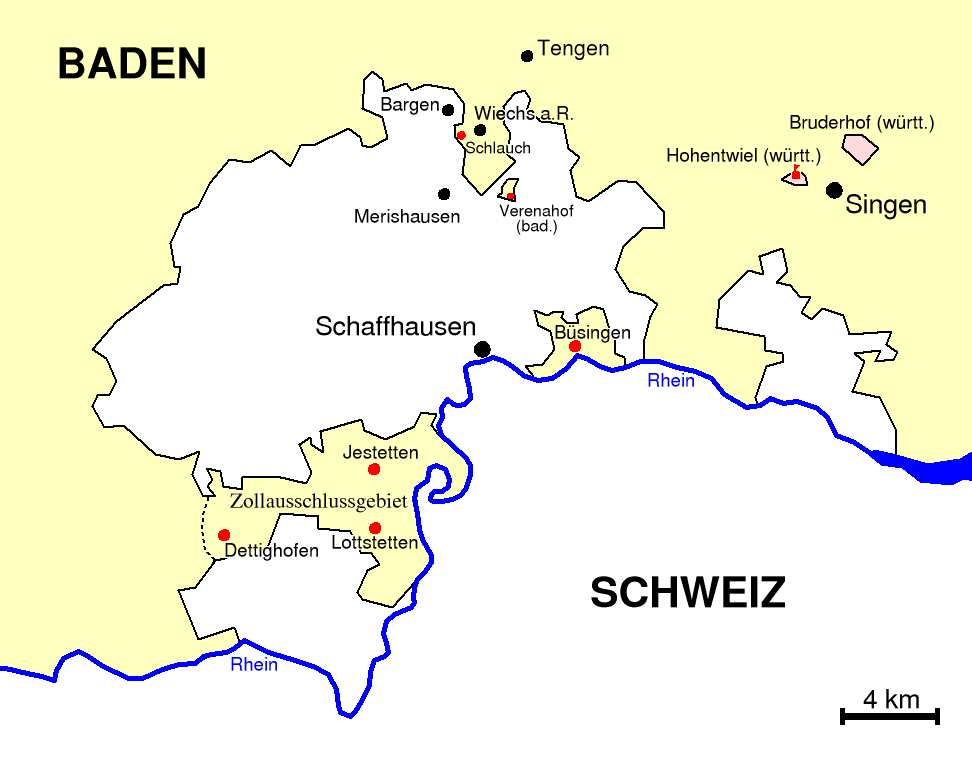
Customs exclusion zone (1840–1935)

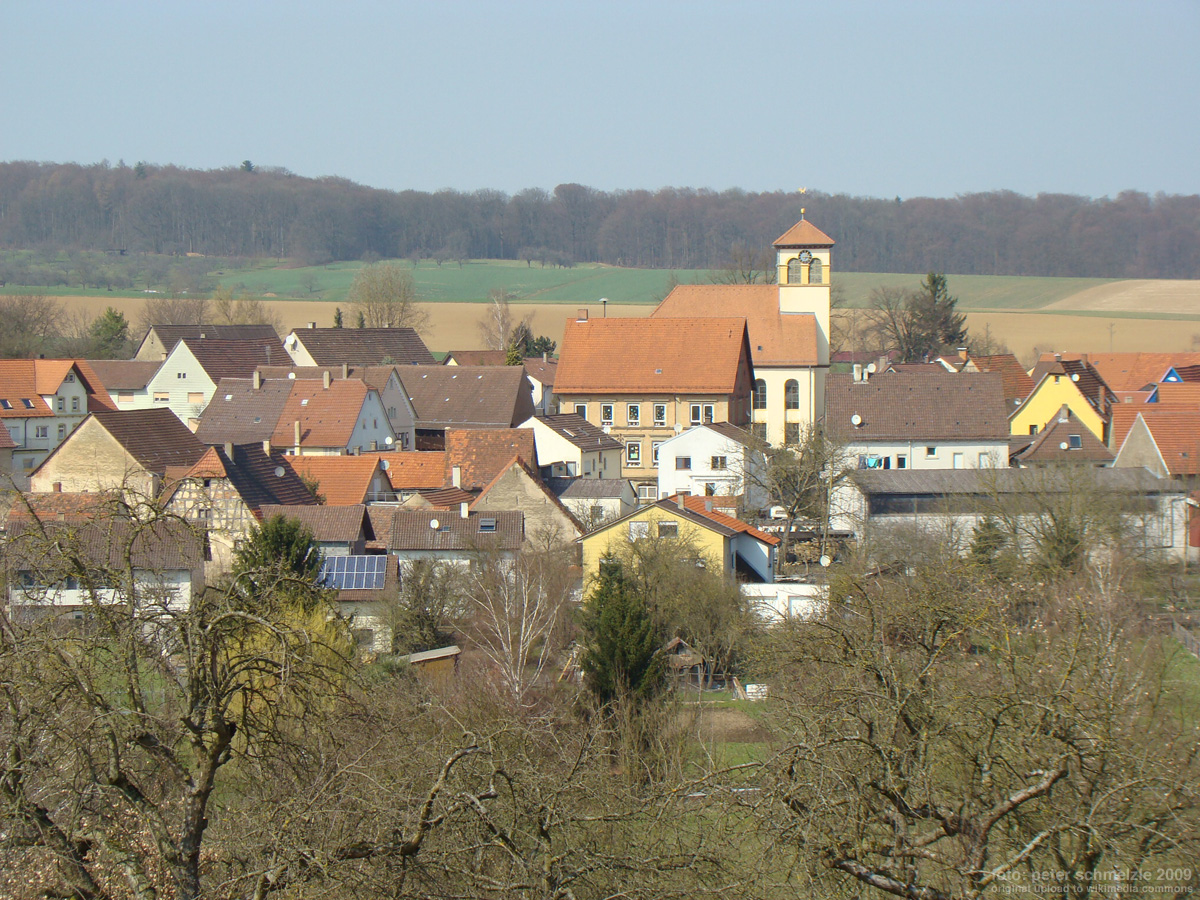
Berwangen

In 1927 the hamlet Häuserhof which had been part of neighbouring Weisweil, became part of Dettighofen as did the hamlet Eichberg which until that year had been part of Bühl.

On 1 April 1936 the hamlet Albführen became part of the municipality of Dettighofen.

On 1 January 1974 the municipalities of Berwangen and Baltersweil merged to become part of Dettighofen.

Dettighofen in Waldshut district

== Geography ==
Dettighofen is located close to the Swiss border. Switzerland lies both to the north, by way of the Canton of Schaffhausen whilst to the south lies Canton Zurich. To the east lies Jestetten.
