= Philippe Mottu =

Swiss diplomat, author and activist

Philippe Mottu was a Swiss diplomat, author and activist born on 9 October 1913 in Geneva; he died in Lonay (Vaud) on 23 August 2010. In 1946, inspired by the American Frank Buchman, he was instrumental in the acquisition of the former Caux Palace Hotel, a dilapidated hotel above Montreux, Switzerland, by a group of about 100 Swiss, in order to create an international conference centre at the service of European reconciliation and reconstruction. He wrote a dozen books of political and social philosophy.

== Biography ==
=== Background and youth ===
The scion of an old Geneva family whose ancestor Jacques Mottu had moved to Geneva towards 1597, Philippe Mottu is the son of the pastor Henri Mottu, moderator of the « vénérable Compagnie des Pasteurs de Genève », and of Marthe Mottu, née Reverdin. A graduate of the Political Science school of the Geneva University, he started his professional life in a bank. In 1933 he underwent a deep spiritual experience which led him to undertake theology studies in Lausanne. There, his Latin professor, Jules Rochat, put him in touch with the Oxford Group, soon to become Moral Rearmament (and currently Initiatives of Change). He was immediately won by the ideas and practice of the Oxford Group.

=== Moral Rearmament ===
In 1935, Philippe Mottu meets for the first time Frank Buchman, the Oxford Group's founder who visits Geneva with a team in order to talk to League of Nations delegates. It is the beginning of a lifelong friendship, with its ups and downs, through which the two men will exchange abundant correspondence.

In 1938, as European nations re-armed for war, Buchman called for 'moral and spiritual re-armament' as the way to build a 'hate-free, fear-free, greed-free world'. Enthusiastic, Philippe Mottu became one of the main activists of Moral Reamament (MRA) in Switzerland. In this capacity he participated in numerous MRA actions at home and abroad, particularly the massive meeting of Palais Baulieu in Lausanne in 1937 (10’000 participants) or the international meeting of Interlaken in 1938.

In 1939 Philippe Mottu was called into active service and joined the "Army and Home" section at the Swiss Army's headquarters, probably at General Guisan's request as the general partly relied on MRA to build up Swiss morale and resistance spirit. With Denis de Rougemont and Theophil Spoerri, he took an active part in the setting up of the Gotthard League, a civil society movement dedicated to countering "defeatism and deceptive propaganda" in the face of intense Nazi propaganda which Switzerland was subject to at the time. "We wanted to proclaim that our country would remain faithful to his multi-secular democratic tradition", he explained.

He then joined the Federal Department of Foreign Affairs in Bern.

=== The war years ===
In 1940, Philippe Mottu established contact with a German diplomat in Bern, Herbert Blankenhorn, and, through him, with Adam von Trott zu Solz, one of the leaders of German resistance to Nazism. Upon von Trott's invitation, Mottu travelled to Berlin in November 1942 where he meets with other members of the resistance. During a British bombardment, a top German Foreign Affairs official, Hans-Bernd von Haften, asked him: "As Christians, are we allowed to kill Hitler?"

Supported by the Swiss foreign minister, Marcel Pilet-Golaz, Philippe Mottu continued his contacts with von Trott and offered to act as a liaison person between the allied powers and the German Resistance by travelling himself to the United States, even though it was difficult to travel outside Switzerland. In April 1944, von Trott visited Switzerland where he was promised assistance to reach Lisbon, while Allen Dulles, chief of the OSS in Switzerland, promised his assistance for a transatlantic trip. A few days after the joint US-British Normandy landings on 6 June 1944, Mottu was in Stuttgart with von Trott and his group of friends : their coup was imminent. Mottu left for Washington having memorised all the names of the new German government.

To his despair, President Roosevelt and his advisors didn't believe in the German resistance. Additionally on 20 July 1944, Operation Walkyrie failed. His worst fears became reality when, in the course of the following weeks and months, he got confirmation of the arrest and execution of all the main conspirators : von Trott, von Haften and hundreds of others...

=== Caux ===
Philippe Mottu had been deeply affected by his experience during WWII. In 1943 already, a recurring thought had come to him: "If Switzerland escapes the ravages of this war, its mission will be to create a venue where French and Germans will be able to reconcile and build peace. Caux is the place."

With the financial support of around 100 Swiss families, Philippe Mottu and one of his friends Robert Hahnloser bought the derelict Caux Palace Hotel in 1946. It was repaired and refurbished thanks to the efforts of the Swiss and international teams, and, between 1946 and 1950, it welcomed thousands of French and German participants, among whom Konrad Adenauer and Robert Schuman, who will later rely on their exceptional mutual trust to launch the first steps of the European construction. The Caux summer conferences dedicated to peace and reconciliation are still taking place today.

Philippe Mottu contributed to the governance of the Caux conference centre from 1946 to 1961 and from 1967 to 1973 as a member of the Caux Foundation council. He was the Foundation's first president, from 1946 to 1958. Later on, he increasingly turned to the writing of numerous political philosophy books.

== Family ==
On 1 September 1939, Philippe Mottu married Hélène de Trey. They will have four children, and, on the date of Philippe Mottu's death, nine grandchildren and one great-granddaughter.

His younger brother Daniel Mottu will be the Caux Foundation's president from 1977 to 1987.

== Publications ==
Philippe Mottu wrote several books on international, political and social issues. Building on a vast culture and on a rigorous analysis of his time's trends, he for instance exposed the rise of intolerance and extremism in Judaism, Christianity and Islam; he was searching in which way humanity would adapt to the momentous transformations of the 20th century, and develop a harmonious society in the future, expressing the hope is that humanity will find spiritual resources allowing it to envisage its future with « a measure of serenity".

List of Philippe Mottu's publications:

- Fondement spirituel d’un renouveau national (Spiritual Foundation For a National Renewal ), dans Pierres d’angle de la Reconstruction nationale (Corner Stones of the National Reconstruction), Neuchâtel & Paris, Delachaux & Niestlé SA, 1940.
- La Suisse forge son destin (Switzerland Forges its Destiny), with several other Gotthard League's members, Neuchâtel, La Baconnière, 1942.
- L’Occident au défi (The West Challenged), Neuchâtel, La Baconnière, 1963.
- Démocratie et totalitarisme, (Democracy and Totalitarianism) publié par la section Armée et Foyer de l’État-major de l’Armée, 1964.
- The Secret of Civilization (in English only), in Modernizing America, Los Angeles, Pace Publications, 1965.
- Le destin de l’homme face au monde moderne (Human Destiny Confronted to the Modern World), published in Les conférences du cénacle, Beyrouth, Lebanon, 1967.
- Révolution politique et révolution de l’homme (Political Revolution and Human Revolution), Neuchâtel, La Baconnière, 1967.
- Caux - de la belle époque au réarmement moral (Caux – from Belle Époque to Moral Rearmament), Neuchâtel, La Baconnière, 1969 (translated into English and German).
- Le serpent dans l’ordinateur, essai sur le comportement de l’homme mis au défi par la modernité (The Snake in the Computer, Essay on Human Behaviour Challenged by Modern Times), Neuchâtel, La Baconnière, 1976.
- La dynamique des prix (Prices’ Dynamics), essai sur le phénomène ondulatoire des marchés boursiers, Genève, Georg & Cie, 1983.
- Les de Trey, bourgeois de Payerne (The De Trey, Citizens of Payerne), Morges, Cabédita, 1988.
- Regards sur le Siècle (A Look At The Century), Lausanne, L’Âge d’Homme Publishers, 1996, 319 pages, ISBN 2825107867, preface by Edouard Balladur.

== Legacy ==
As a thinker and as an activist, Philippe Mottu played a role in Swiss and European history, contributing to reinforce the spirit of resistance to fascism in Switzerland through the Gotthard League, to support German resistance to Hitler and on the European scene in triggering the setting up of the Caux conference Centre.

He was an early proponent of Moral Rearmament in Switzerland and played a leading role in the establishment and administration of the Caux Palace Hotel as the Caux conference centre. In 1946, he and Robert Hahnloser signed the purchase agreement for the property before all of the required funds had been secured, assuming responsibility for completing the acquisition by the payment deadline..
