= Spoerri =

Spoerri is a surname. Notable people with the surname include:

- Bruno Spoerri (born 1935), Swiss jazz and electronics musician
- Daniel Spoerri (1930–2024), Swiss artist and writer
- Otto Spoerri (1933–2008), Swiss accountant
- Theophil Spoerri (1890–1974), Swiss writer and academic
