= Denis de Rougemont =

Swiss writer and cultural theorist (1906-1985)

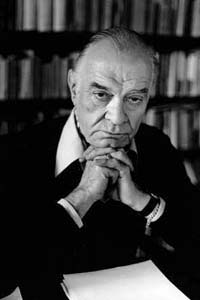
- Born: 8 September 1906; Couvet, Canton of Neuchâtel, Switzerland
- Died: 6 December 1985 (aged 79); Geneva, Canton of Geneva, Switzerland
- Spouse(s): Simone Vion (m. 1933–1951); Anaïte "Nanik" Repond (m. 1952–1985)

Education
- Education: University of Neuchâtel (B.A.)

Philosophical work
- Era: 20th-century philosophy
- Region: Western Philosophy
- School: Continental philosophy Personalism; Non-conformists of the 1930s
- Institutions: École libre des hautes études Graduate Institute of European Studies, University of Geneva

Denys Louis de Rougemont (French: [dəni də ʁuʒmɔ̃]; September 8, 1906 – December 6, 1985), known as Denis de Rougemont (French: [dəni də ʁuʒmɔ̃]), was a Swiss writer and cultural theorist who wrote in French. One of the non-conformists of the 1930s, he addressed the perils of totalitarianism from a Christian point of view. After the Second World War, he promoted European federalism.

== Life ==
He studied at the University of Neuchâtel and in Vienna, and then moved to Paris in 1930. There he wrote for and edited various publications, associating with the personalist groupings and the non-conformists of the 1930s: with Emmanuel Mounier and Arnaud Dandieu, he founded the magazines Esprit and L'Ordre Nouveau, and he also co-founded a magazine, with Roland de Pury, on existential theology, Hic et Nunc.

In June 1940, fearing that defeatism and the pressure of Nazi propaganda (and armies) would lead the federal government to submit to the Germans and give up the traditional democratic values of Switzerland, he led with Zurich University Professor Theophil Spoerri a group of young people which created a civil society organisation called the Gotthard League in order to defend both Christian values and the independence of Switzerland. De Rougemont wrote the movement's manifesto and on 22 July an "Appeal to the Swiss People" which was widely published in the Swiss press to rally support for the movement.

Later in 1940, after having authored a sharp column in a Swiss newspaper which infuriated the German government, he was sent to the United States and administered French broadcasting for the Voice of America. He likewise taught at the École Libre des Hautes Études in New York before returning to Europe in 1946.

He founded in Geneva the "Centre Européen de la Culture" in 1950 and in 1963 the "Institut Universitaire d'Etudes Européennes" (IUEE, "Graduate Institute of European Studies", attached to the University of Geneva). He was president of the Paris-based Congrès pour la Liberté de la Culture. Probably his most influential work is Love in the Western World (1939, 1956, 1972; English translations 1940, 1956, 1982).

The 1989–1990 academic year at the College of Europe was named in his honour.

He is buried at the Cimetière des Rois in the Plainpalais district of Geneva.

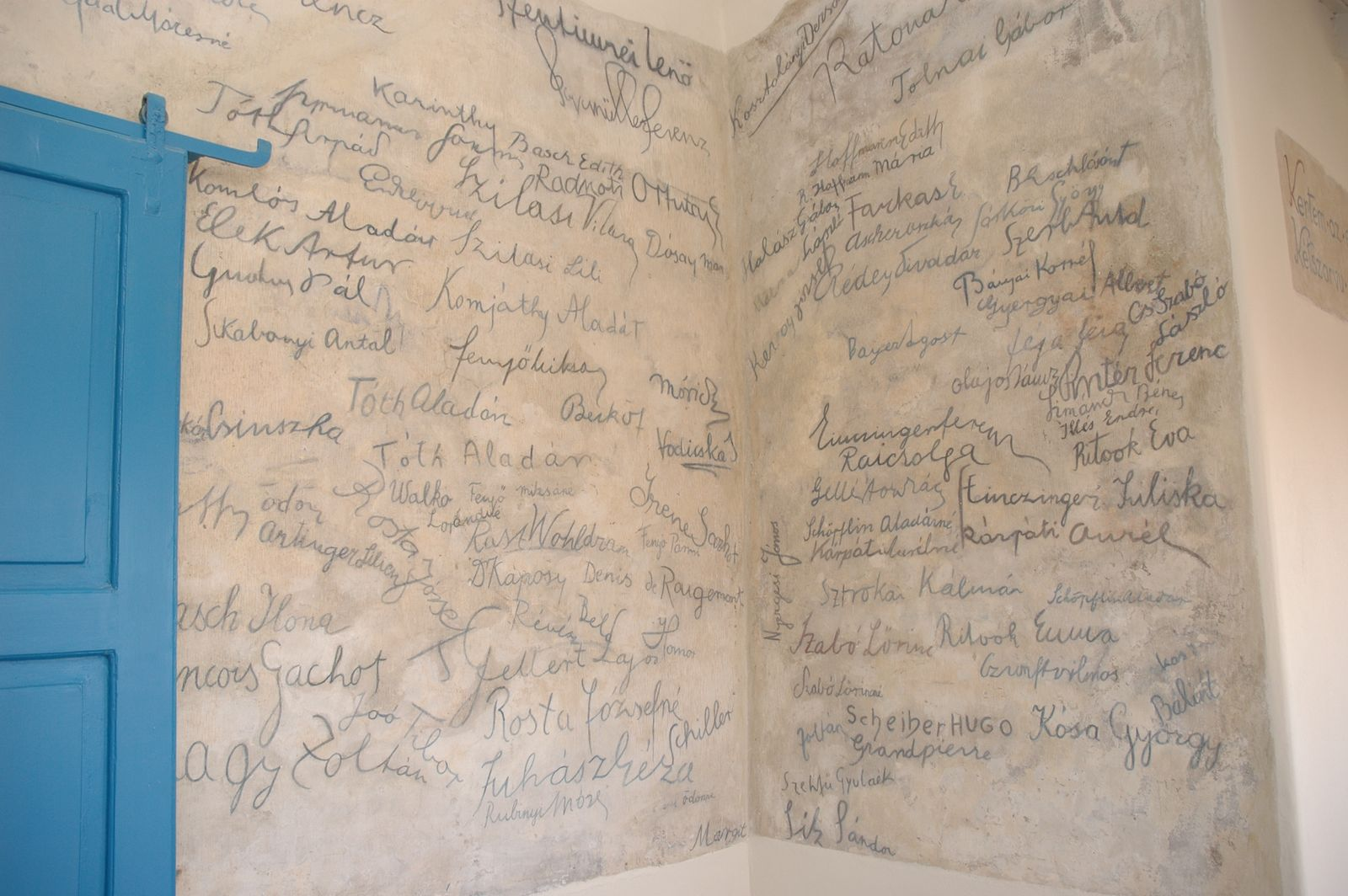
His signature among other authors and poets on the Mihály Babits Memorial House's autograph wall in Esztergom, Hungary

== Works ==
- Les Méfaits de l'Instruction publique (1929)
- Le Paysan du Danube (1932)
- Politique de la Personne (1934)
- Penser avec les Mains (1936)
- Journal d'un Intellectuel en chômage (1937)
- Journal d'Allemagne (1938)
- L'Amour et l'Occident (1939, revised 1956 and 1972), translated as Love in the Western World (US) and Passion and Society (UK)
- Nicolas de Flue (1939)
- Mission ou Démission de la Suisse (1940)
- Qu'est-ce que la Ligue du Gothard? (1940)
- La Part du Diable (1942/1944) translated as Talk of the Devil by Kathleen Raine
- Les Personnes du Drame (1944)
- Journal des deux Mondes (1946)
- Doctrine Fabuleuse (1946)
- Vivre en Amérique (1947)
- L'Europe en jeu (1948)
- Lettres aux députés européens (1950)
- L'Aventure occidentale de l'Homme (1957)
- Comme Toi-Même (1961), translated as Myths of Love (1963)
- The Christian Opportunity (1963)
- Fédéralisme culturel (1965)
- La Suisse ou l'Histoire d'un Peuple heureux (1965)
- Journal d'une époque (1926-1946) (1968)
- Les Mythes de l'Amour (1972)
- L'Avenir est notre Affaire (1977)
- L'Ecrivain et la politique: les problèmes de l'engagement (1978)
- Vers la relance du débat européen? Le déclin de l'Europe, mythe et histoire (1978)
- De l'Europe des Etats coalisés à l'Europe des peuples fédérés (1978)
- Rapport au peuple européen sur l'état de l'union de l'Europe 1979 (1979)
- Formule d’une Europe parallèle ou rêverie d’un fédéraliste libertaire (1979)
- Inédits, ed by Jean Mantzouranis and François Saint-Ouen (1988)
- Dictionnaire international du fédéralisme (Dir.), ed by François Saint-Ouen (1994)

== See also ==
- Robert Aron
- The Little Prince
