= Gotthard League =

1940 Swiss civil society movement countering Nazi propaganda

The Gotthard League (de. Gotthardbund, fr. Ligue du Gothard, it. Lega del Gottardo) was a Swiss civil society movement formed in 1940 with the aim to combat defeatism and Nazi propaganda at a time when the Swiss were surrounded by triumphant and obviously aggressive Axis powers armies.

== Context ==
In 1940, confronted with the successful Blitzkrieg of Nazi Germany against Poland and France, and the German Panzer divisions lined up along their border, the Swiss government found itself in an awkward position. The Germans even demanded apologies for the destruction of German planes which had been shot down by the Swiss after violating the Swiss airspace and the Armistice of 22 June 1940 between France and Germany made it likely that German invasion plans of Switzerland would be implemented. There were strong trends within Switzerland which advocated submission to the Germans. Sustained Nazi propaganda emanated from the 30,000-strong German community in Switzerland, the German embassy and consulates and from the extreme right Frontenbewegung ("Fronts Movement" or "Frontismus") which became amalgamated into the Swiss National Movement in June 1940.

The then President of the Swiss Confederation and Foreign Minister, Marcel Pilet-Golaz delivered on 25 June 1940 an ambiguous speech where he made allusions to an "adaptation to the new conditions", a "partial demobilization of the Army", a "national turnaround", a more authoritarian regime for Switzerland and to a "new order" in Europe, in short a lot of Petainist vocabulary mixed with consensual, religious-ringing rhetoric (which earned the speech the nickname of “sermon”). The German version of this originally French text was slightly adapted and contained quite a few words reminiscent of National Socialist speech. His calculated but ambiguous attitude was confirmed and raise even more doubts within Switzerland when he received on the federal premises a delegation of the Swiss extreme right "frontists", on 10 and 14 September 1940.

== History ==
=== The launching of the Gotthard League ===
Fearing that defeatism and the effects of the Nazi propaganda would lead the federal government to submit to the Germans and give up the traditional democratic values of Switzerland, a group of young people led by Denis de Rougemont and Professor Theophil Spoerri founded the Gotthard League on 30 June 1940 in order to defend both these values and the independence of Switzerland. On 22 July an “Appeal to the Swiss People” written by de Rougemont was published in the Swiss press to rally support for the movement.
Signatories were, besides de Rougemont and Spoerri, Walther Allgöwer, who was at the time a military instructor and later became a politician within the Radical-Democratic Party (PRD); Robert Eibel, from the conservative-liberal movement Redressement national; Christian Gasser, from the liberal “Ligue des Non-Subventionnés”; René Leyvraz, a social-democrat Christian trade-unionist; Philippe Mottu, from Moral Rearmament; Paul Schäfer, also from Moral Rearmament; Heinrich Schnyder, a manager from the Migros groceries firm.
Charles-F. Ducommun, a trade-unionist, and Julien Lescaze, communication officer at the ICRC soon joined the signatories and worked efficiently to spread the League's message.
Among the most notable supporters of the Gotthard League are Gottlieb Duttweiler, founder of the Migros chain of grocery stores, Protestant theologian Emil Brunner, conservative historian Gonzague de Reynold and socialist philosopher and psychologist Philippe Müller.
It must be added that the opinion differences between Denis de Rougemont and Gonzague de Reynold did create serious difficulties which prevented the Gotthard League to communicate consistently and that the hurried departure of de Rougemont for a 5-year exile in the USA under pressure of the Germans probably helped tilt the balance towards the more conservative side of the Gotthard League.
However the launching of the Gotthard League, facilitated by a personal gift of 50’000 Swiss francs, was a major event. The League’s manifesto was carried by no less than 74 Swiss newspapers and was followed by more publications in the following ten days, including one appeal signed by the respected Zurich professor Theo Spoerri, regarded as the leader of Moral Rearmament in Switzerland, who had been elected to lead the governing body of the Gotthard League.

=== Ideology ===
Denis de Rougemont wrote a 10-page manifesto entitled What Is the Gotthard League? ("Qu'est-ce que la Ligue du Gothard ?") explaining its principles: on one hand active neutrality and on the other hand faithfulness to the fundamental values of Switzerland such as federalism, in order to resist "at all costs" to totalitarianisms. It went on to add that the immediate means of action of the League rested entirely on its members' public expression. It appealed strongly in favour of the military defense of the réduit national around the Saint-Gotthard Massif – as advocated by General Guisan, of intelligence gathering, of a series of economic and political reforms and of a "struggle against defeatism and deceitful propaganda".
The plea in favour of the country’s military defense was totally in line with General Guisan’s strategy. (On 25 July 1940, General Guisan had delivered a historic address to the entire Swiss Officer Corps assembled on the Rütli, a location identified as the site of the founding act of the Swiss confederation in 1291. He had taken every disposition so that Switzerland could resist Nazi invasion and had made it very clear there would never be any surrender; Swiss citizens had been instructed to disregard any surrender broadcast, as it would either be done under threat or be enemy propaganda.) This is hardly surprising since both Denis de Rougemont and Philippe Mottu worked for the "Army and Home" section at the Swiss Army's headquarters, an internal propaganda department which General Guisan strongly developed during the war years.
However, the Gotthard League slowly shifted towards structures inspired by past regimes. The federal assembly representing the cantons was for instance named "Diète" (Diet) as in the Ancien Régime of Switzerland (prior to the 1798 French invasion).
In the same spirit the Gotthard League decided in November 1940 to base its principles exclusively on Christianity; therefore, somewhat surprisingly albeit with chosen words, it kept Jews and Freemasons at bay: "The Gotthard League holds that emotional campaigns against Jews or Freemasons are not desirable. It believes that this country’s Christian traditions will remain the basis of our political life and that, in the future, the greatest clarity and candour will need to be applied. Given these principles, people to whom Christian traditions are foreign or belonging to organisations subject to secret or foreign influence are not eligible as Gotthard League members."

=== Early development ===
Working through press conferences, « patriotic evenings », meetings, courses, advertisements, posters and pamphlets, the circa 8000 members of the League campaigned for collective social responsibility on matters such as agricultural development (to achieve food self-sufficiency, see fr:Plan Wahlen), family protection, elderly care, and job creations. Their programme also included a revision of the political system introducing more authority in democracy and a corporatist organisation of the economy.
The League adopted a federal structure, local teams being part of a federation, which itself was headed by a governing body (directoire) in charge of coordination the initiatives of the local groups.

=== Post-War Life ===
In 1951, activities were focalised on the national level. The main post-war issues were dealt with through over 300 « open letters » advocating solutions to the Swiss society’s new challenges. The Gotthard League was dissolved in 1969. Professor Spoerri remained its president until the end.

== Evaluation ==
=== Influence ===
The Gotthard League’s influence in Switzerland during the war years was sizeable. Denis de Rougemont wrote that the Gotthard League’s influence on the Swiss morale was distinctly felt after only one month of campaigning: it created “a salutary shock on Swiss public opinion, restoring confidence in many a citizen and it gave birth to a great hope, dissipating some of the defeatist mists.”.
The Gotthard League also helped military officers who had been deeply unsettled by the Swiss President Pilet-Golaz’ public address on 25 June and who were considering a coup, to stay within the limits of the law; one of them, captain Alfred Ernst, even donated 50’000 Swiss Francs (an inheritance) to the Gotthard League, so that the resistance message could be brought to the country by the Gotthard League rather than by the young revolted army officers, provided quick action was undertaken.

=== Criticism ===
The Gotthard League’s attempt to unite people from highly diverse backgrounds into a kind of union of opposites (Catholics and Protestants, French-speaking and German-speaking, political right and left, ...) raised questions in many quarters of Swiss society and criticism was both sharp and immediate; in a letter dated 6 August 1940, Denis de Rougemont mentions « the 200 articles written against us » and he goes on to add « we are being accused with utmost assurance to be Nazis, Marxists, Catholics, Oxfordians, a daughter company of Duttweiler, utopians, fixers, etc. etc. »
In 2001, Swiss historian Michel Perdrizat declared that the Gotthard League had led an ambiguous policy by trying to combine resistance spirit with a political renovation of Switzerland, going into the direction of a conservative, antidemocratic state; he regards the leaders of the Gotthard League as naïve.
In 2009 however, historian Daniel Bourgeois warned that it is difficult to judge with hindsight. Whereas sympathy for French Maréchal Philippe Pétain was widespread in the French-speaking part of Switzerland and could explain the resurgence of the French Révolution nationale ideas or words in statements issued by movements such as the Gotthard League, there were other confusing words elsewhere in these tense and troubled times, like de Gaulle substituting "Honneur et Patrie" to "Liberté, Égalité, Fraternité" as the French national motto, or the "tragic Petainist illusion" harboured by Resistance hero Henri Frenay in the early moments of the French Resistance movement.

== Connected articles ==
- Denis de Rougemont
