= Rhine Falls =

Largest waterfall of Europe located in Switzerland

- German: Rheinfall
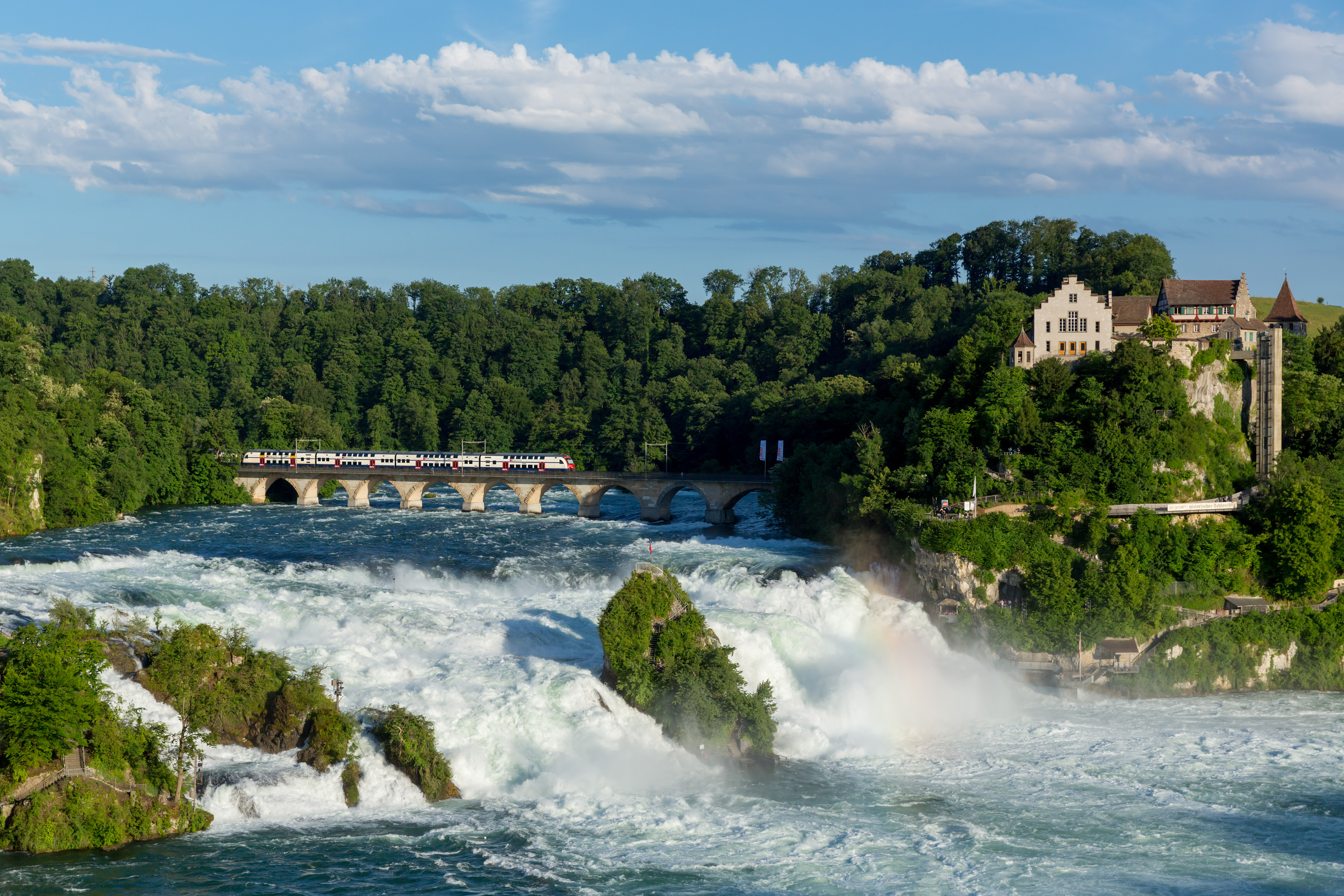
- Rhine Falls with Rheinfall Bridge and Laufen Castle

- Location within Switzerland Location within Canton of Schaffhausen Location within Canton of Zurich
- Interactive map of Rhine Falls
- Location: On the border between the cantons of Schaffhausen and Zurich, near the town of Schaffhausen, in northern Switzerland
- Coordinates: 47°40′38″N 8°36′57″E
- Type: Segmented Block
- Elevation: 364 m (1,194 ft)
- Total height: 23 metres (75 ft)
- Number of drops: 1
- Total width: 150 metres (490 ft)
- Watercourse: Rhine
- Average flow rate: 250 m^{3}/s (8,800 cu ft/s) during winter, 600 m^{3}/s (21,000 cu ft/s) during summer

The Rhine Falls (German: Rheinfall [ˈraɪnfal] / Swiss German: Rhyfall [ˈriːfal], a singular noun) is a waterfall on the High Rhine in Switzerland. It is the most powerful waterfall in Europe and a popular tourist attraction.

The falls are located on the border between the cantons of Schaffhausen (SH) and Zurich (ZH), between the municipalities of Neuhausen am Rheinfall (SH) and Laufen-Uhwiesen/Dachsen (ZH), ca. 3 km (1.9 mi) south of the town of Schaffhausen and close to the border with Germany.

The falls are 150 m (490 ft) wide and 23 m (75 ft) high. In the winter months, the average water flow is 250 m^{3}/s (8,800 cu ft/s), while in the summer, the average water flow is 600 m^{3}/s (21,000 cu ft/s). The highest flow ever measured was 1,250 cubic metres per second (44,000 cu ft/s) in 1965, and the lowest, 95 cubic metres per second (3,400 cu ft/s) in 1921. The highest waterfall in Switzerland are the Mürrenbach Falls (417 m (1,368 ft)).

== Geology ==
The Rhine Falls are located between the Swiss Plateau and Table Jura. The waterfall was formed during the last ice age, approximately 14,000 to 17,000 years ago, by erosion-resistant rocks narrowing the riverbed. The first glacial advances created today's landforms approximately 500,000 years ago. Up to the end of the Wolstonian Stage, approximately 132,000 years ago, the Rhine flowed westwards from Schaffhausen through the Klettgau valley. This earlier riverbed later filled up with gravel.

About 132,000 years ago the course of the river changed southwards at Schaffhausen and formed a new channel, which also filled up with gravel. Part of the Rhine today includes this ancient riverbed.

During the Würm glaciation, the Rhine was pushed far to the south to its present course, over a hard Late Jurassic limestone bed. As the river flowed over both the hard limestone and the easily eroded gravel from previous glaciations, formed the waterfall. The Rheinfallfelsen, a large rock in the middle of the falls, is the remnant of the original limestone cliff flanking the former channel. The rock has eroded very little over the years because relatively little sediment comes down the Rhine from Lake Constance. The rock of the Rheinfallfelsen is ca. 150 million years old. On the Zurich side of the waterfall there is a 4–6 metres (13–20 ft) deep and 6 metres wide karst cave, which was the last time visible in April 1921 when the Rhine had low water levels. The cave is about 50 million years old.

The formation of the Rhine Falls is shown in a permanent exhibition at the Museum zu Allerheiligen in Schaffhausen.

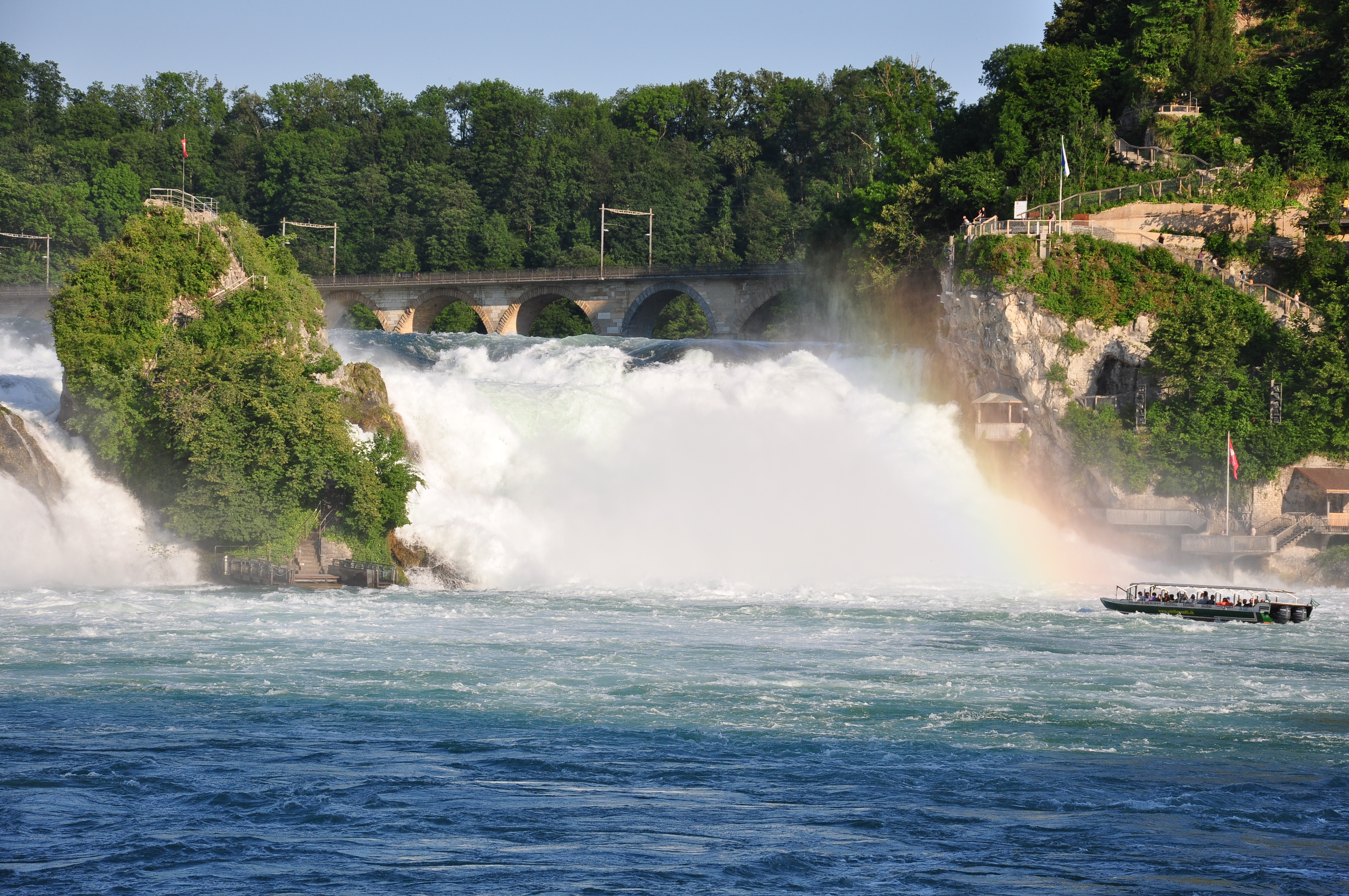
The Rhine Falls and Rheinfallfelsen seen from the Rhine

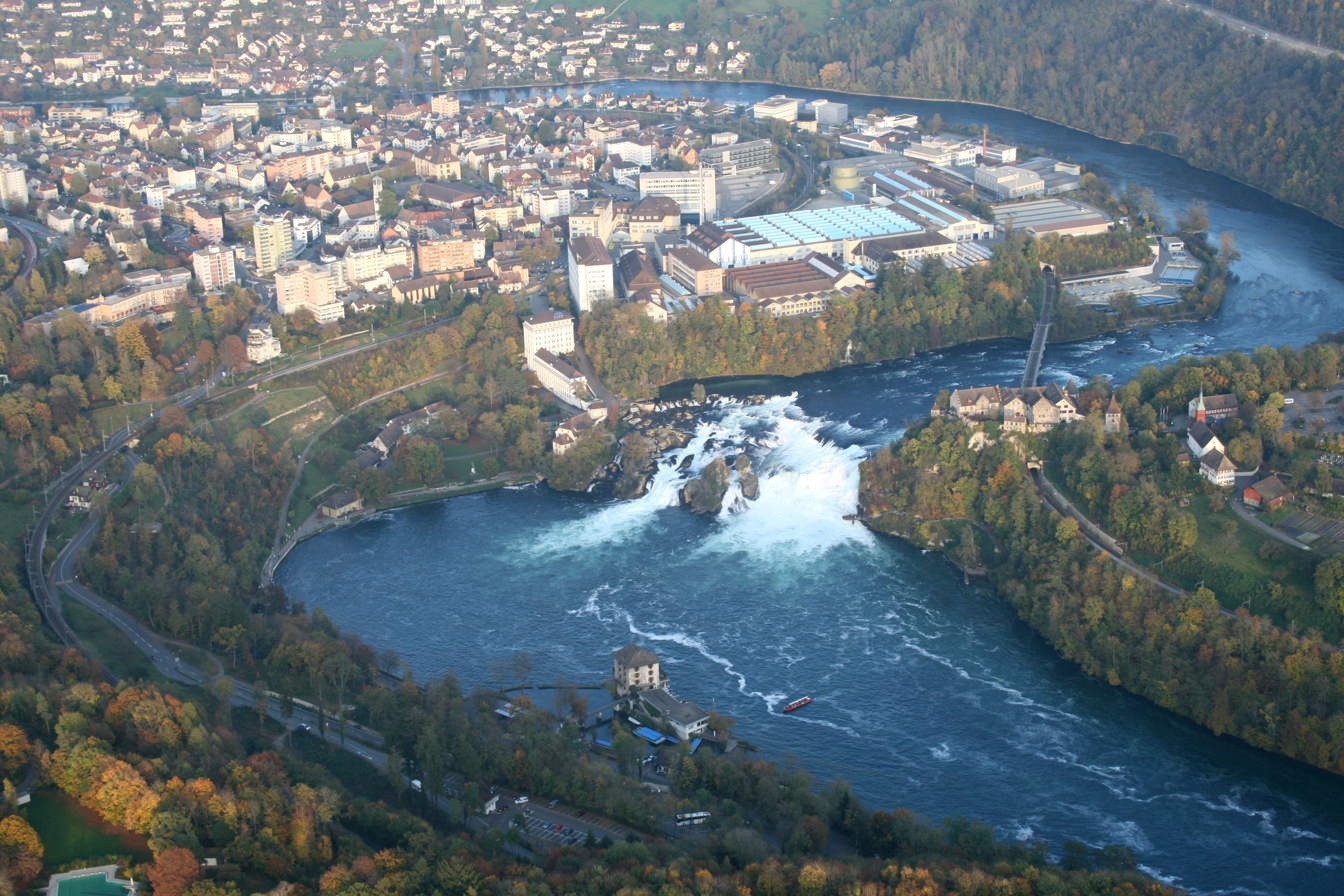
Aerial view of the Rhine Falls in 2008

== Economics ==
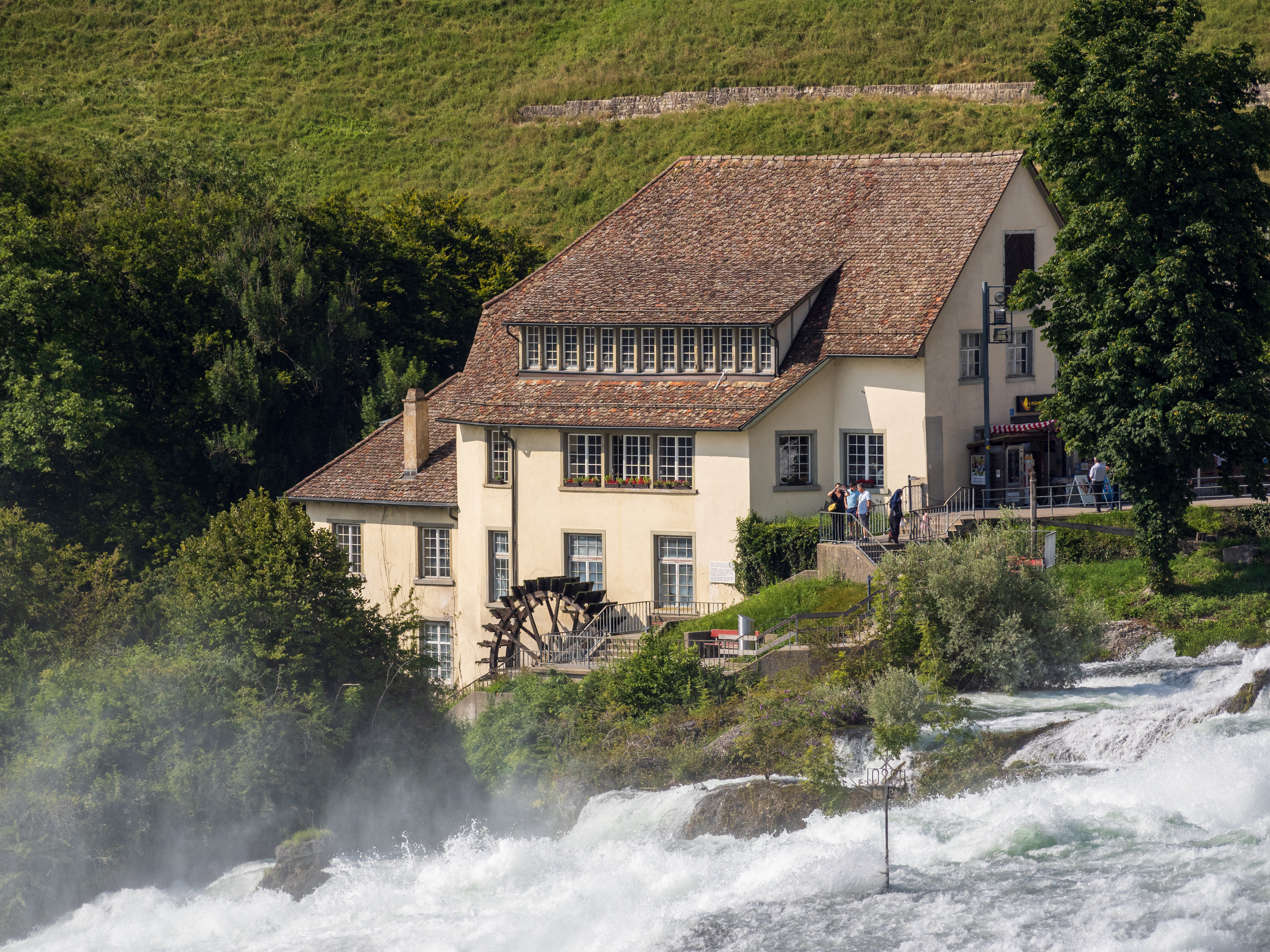
Watermill at the Rhine falls

The north side of the falls is a millsite. In the 17th century, a blast furnace for smelting iron ore found in the limestone was built. It was in operation until the first half of the 19th century.

In 1887, the ironworks applied for permission to divert between one fifth to one half of the river's flow for electricity generation. The Swiss Alpine Club, the Schweizerische Naturforschende Gesellschaft (a nature group) and several scientific societies opposed the plan.

In 1913, an international competition was held for the best plan for a shipping route between the city of Basel and Lake Constance (Bodensee).

In 1919, a company wanting to build power stations in northern Switzerland were told that any such station at the Rhine Falls "must serve the economic interest of the public".

In 1944, the Swiss Council of States granted permission to build the proposed power station. The permission was to become effective on 1 February 1948, with construction to begin in 1952. But in 1951, the Neue Helvetische Gesellschaft (lit. 'New Helvetic Society'), under the leadership of Emil Egli, got 150,000 Swiss citizens to sign a petition protesting the project; among the signatories were 49 famous citizens, including Hermann Hesse and Carl Jacob Burckhardt. The petition not only scuttled the power station project, but effectively prevented all future hydropower and navigation engineering projects on the upper Rhine to the present day.

Today, the falls are still under consideration for hydropower projects. If the full water flow were used, the power generated would average approximately 50 MW. The economic value of the falls as a tourist attraction may be greater.

== Tourism ==
People have visited the Rhine Falls since the Middle Ages, with an increase in frequency during the Age of Enlightenment, often as part of a person's educational journey. From the mid-19th century until World War I, the waterfall became a popular holiday destination, which led to the building of hotels nearby (of which none survived to the present). Following a time of mass tourism after World War II, with up to 3 million visitors annually, the number of tourists declined subsequently, with 1.3 million tourists counted in 2014. Most visits are day trips, while longer stays are rare.

The nearest communities are Neuhausen am Rheinfall just north of the Rhine Falls, where tourists can also view the Wörth Castle (Swiss German: Schlössli Wörth), and Laufen-Uhwiesen, with the Laufen Castle (German: Schloss Laufen) overlooking the waterfall. Access to the other side of the river is possible through boat services or via a sidewalk on the railway bridge (Rheinfallbrücke) upstream of the waterfall. The nearby town of Schaffhausen is known for its medieval town centre, the All Saints monastery and the Munot fortress.

Aside from boat tours to the Rhine Falls' rock (Rheinfallfelsen), there are also viewing platforms with views on the waterfall built on both sides of the Rhine. These are reached via steep and narrow stairs (access by fee on the Schloss Laufen side). Elevators exist in some places. Guided tours of various lengths start from Laufen Castle on the Zurich side of the falls – a youth hostel is also located in Schloss Laufen. Various restaurants are located in Schloss Laufen, Schlössli Wörth and the Rheinfall park next to the basin.

View of the Rhinefall basin with Wörth Castle (right) and Laufen Castle (center), seen from the west

== Transport ==
Public transport in Switzerland is famous for its density and its coordination between services (trains, buses and boats) due to the clock-face schedule.

There are several train stations near the Rhine Falls. The closest ones, within walking distance, are Neuhausen Rheinfall on the northern side of the waterfall and Schloss Laufen am Rheinfall on the southern banks of the river. Both stations are serviced by S-Bahn trains only. The town of Neuhausen has two additional S-Bahn railway stations, Neuhausen and Neuhausen Bad Bf, which are both further away from the Rhine Falls.

Schaffhausen, the largest railway station in the area, is even farther away (ca. 3.5 kilometres / 2.2 miles), but can be reached by frequent bus services operated by Verkehrsbetriebe Schaffhausen (VBSH) and PostAuto, respectively. The closest bus stops in walking distance to the waterfall are Neuhausen, Industrieplatz, Neuhausen, Zentrum (Neuhausen town centre), and Schloss Laufen, Rheinfall (near Laufen Castle).

Trains and buses operate within the fare zone 116 of ZVV in the canton of Zurich, and fare zones 810 and 821 of the Tarifverbund Ostwind in the cantons of Schaffhausen and Zurich. As of December 2025, the following services exist from/to railway stations near the Rhine Falls:

=== Train ===
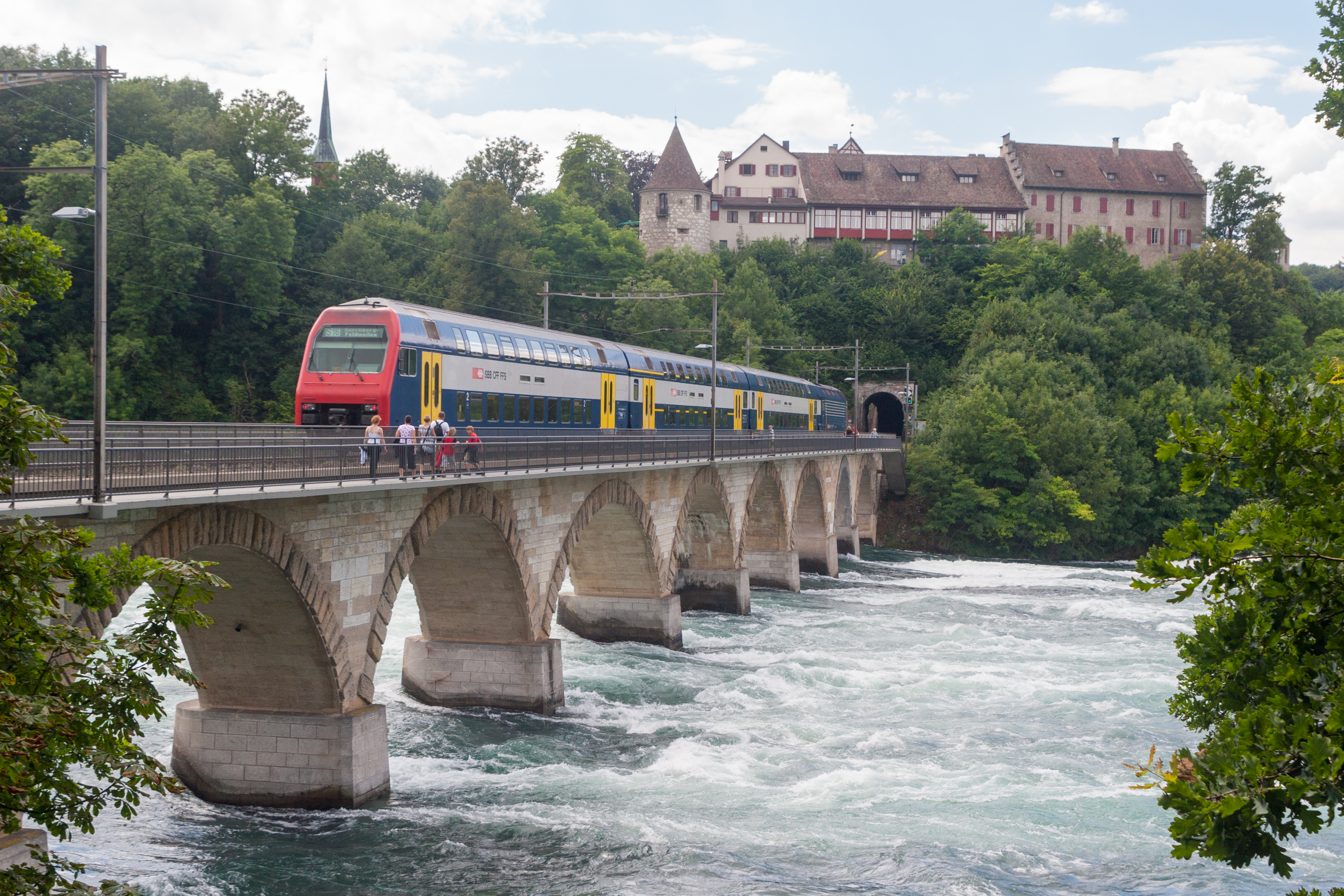
Zurich S-Bahn train arriving at Schloss Laufen am Rheinfall station

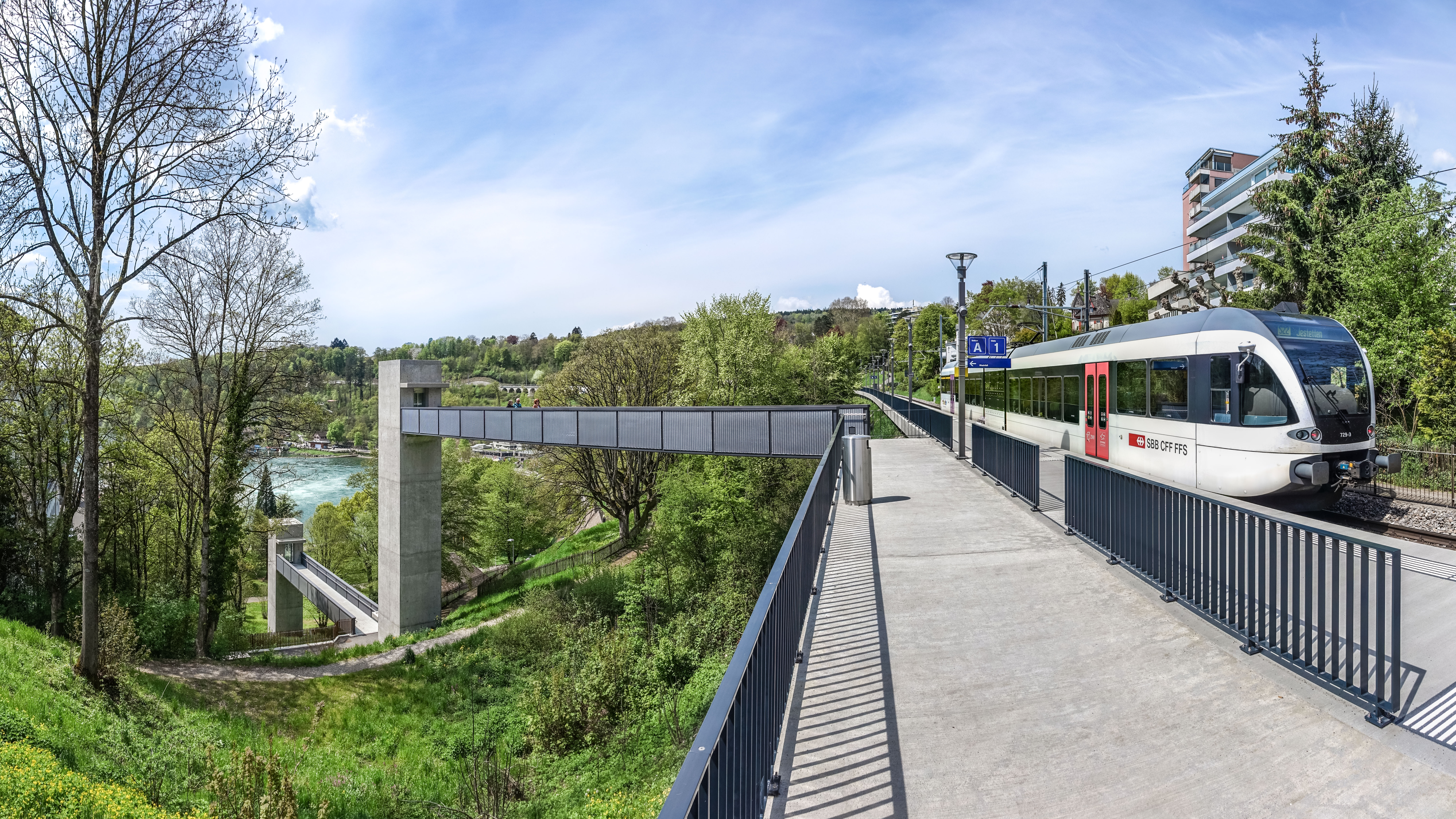
Neuhausen Rheinfall railway station with elevators to the Rhine Falls

InterCity (IC), combined hourly service

- From/to Schaffhausen: / **IC 87**: two-hourly service between Zürich HB and Singen (Hohentwiel) / Stuttgart Hbf

RegioExpress / Regional-Express (RE)

- From/to Schaffhausen: RE48: hourly service between Zürich HB and Schaffhausen (calling also at Zürich Oerlikon and Bülach)
- From/to Schaffhausen: RE 3: hourly service between Basel Bad Bf and Friedrichshafen-Hafen

Zurich S-Bahn

- From/to Neuhausen Rheinfall: S9: hourly service between Uster and Schaffhausen via Zürich HB
- From/to Schloss Laufen am Rheinfall: S12 / S33: combined half-hourly service between Winterthur and Schaffhausen. The S12 continues from Winterthur to Zürich HB and Brugg AG
- From/to Neuhausen/Schaffhausen: S24: hourly service between Winterthur and Thayngen. This service continues from Winterthur to Zurich Airport, Zürich HB and Zug

Schaffhausen S-Bahn

- From/to Schaffhausen: S62: half-hourly service between Singen (Hohentwiel) and Schaffhausen
- From/to Neuhausen Badischer Bahnhof: S64: half-hourly service between Erzingen and Schaffhausen
- From/to Neuhausen Rheinfall: S65: hourly service between Jestetten and Schaffhausen (half-hourly service combined with S9 of Zurich S-Bahn)

St. Gallen S-Bahn

- From/to Schaffhausen: S1: half-hourly service between Wil SG and Schaffhausen (via St. Gallen, Kreuzlingen and Stein am Rhein)

=== Bus ===
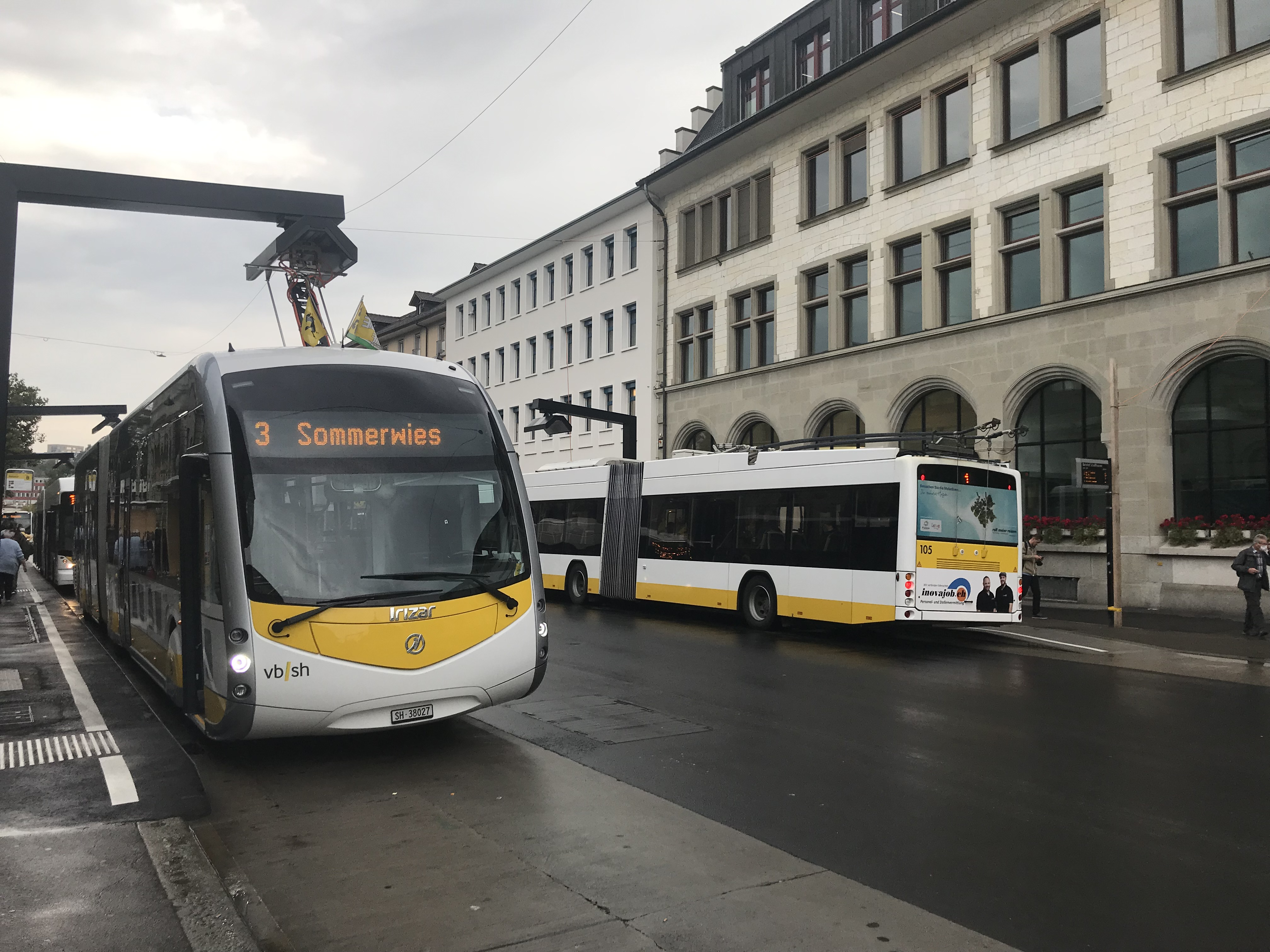
VBSH buses at Schaffhausen railway station

Verkehrsbetriebe Schaffhausen (VBSH)

Line 1 (until December 2025 operated by trolleybuses) is the most direct bus service between Schaffhausen railway station and the Rhine Falls (direction: Herbstäcker).

- 1: every 10 minutes between Waldfriedhof and Herbstäcker (via Schaffhausen), calling at bus stops Neuhausen Zentrum and Neuhausen, Kreuzstrasse (near Badischer Bahnhof)
- 7: every 10–20 minutes between Schaffhausen and Neuhausen SBB, calling at bus stops Neuhausen, Kreuzstrasse, Neuhausen Zentrum and Neuhausen, Industrieplatz
- 21: half-hourly to hourly service between Schaffhausen and Beggingen, calling at Neuhausen, Kreuzstrasse bus stop

PostAuto

- 634: hourly service between Schaffhausen and Schloss Laufen, Rheinfall

=== Boat ===
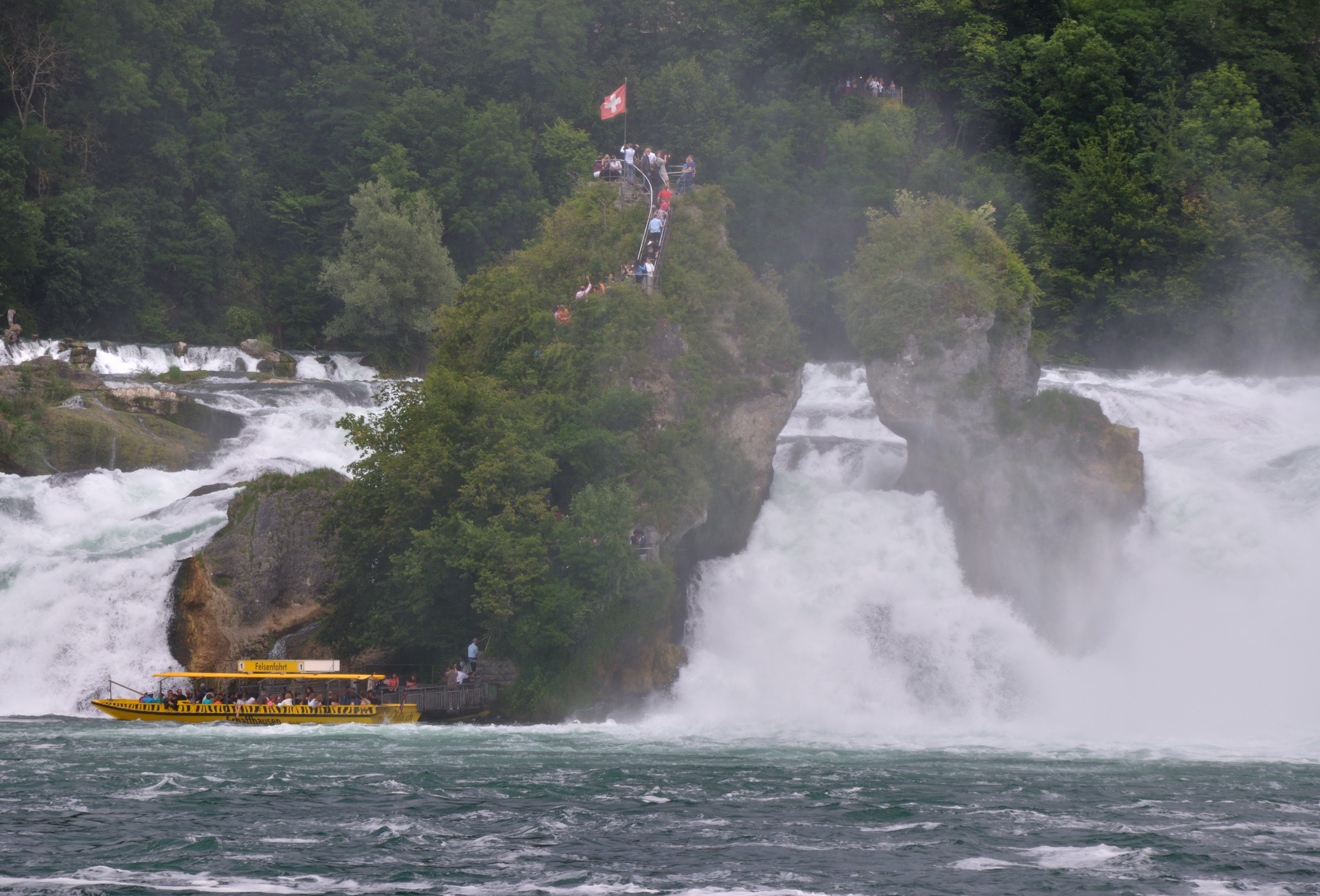
Boat to Rheinfallfelsen

During warmer seasons, frequent boat trips are offered from the Rhine Falls basin to one of the rocks in the middle of the waterfall (Rheinfallfelsen).

There are no boat lines between the Rhine Falls and Schaffhausen (or any other town south of the Rhine Falls), but from April to October there are regular boat services along the scenic High Rhine (Hochrhein) between Schaffhausen Schifflände and Kreuzlingen (Lake Constance), via Konstanz,operated by the Schweizerische Schifffahrtsgesellschaft Untersee und Rhein (URh). Frequent bus services (vbsh lines 6, 8, 25) operate between Schifflände (bus stop has the same name) and Schaffhausen railway station. There is also a trackless train (Rhyfall-Express) running directly between the Rhine Falls and Schifflände during the warmer season.

=== Private transport ===
The Rhine Falls are easily accessible by car, coach, or bicycle. Large pay-parking lots are located on both sides of the falls. The nearest exits on the A4 motorway are Uhwiesen/Rheinfall or Schaffhausen Süd. The Rhine Falls are located on Swiss National Bike Route 2 (Rhine Route).

== History ==
Tourists have been awed by the Rhine Falls for centuries. In the 19th century, the painter J. M. W. Turner made several studies and larger paintings of the falls, and the lyrical poet Eduard Mörike wrote of the falls:

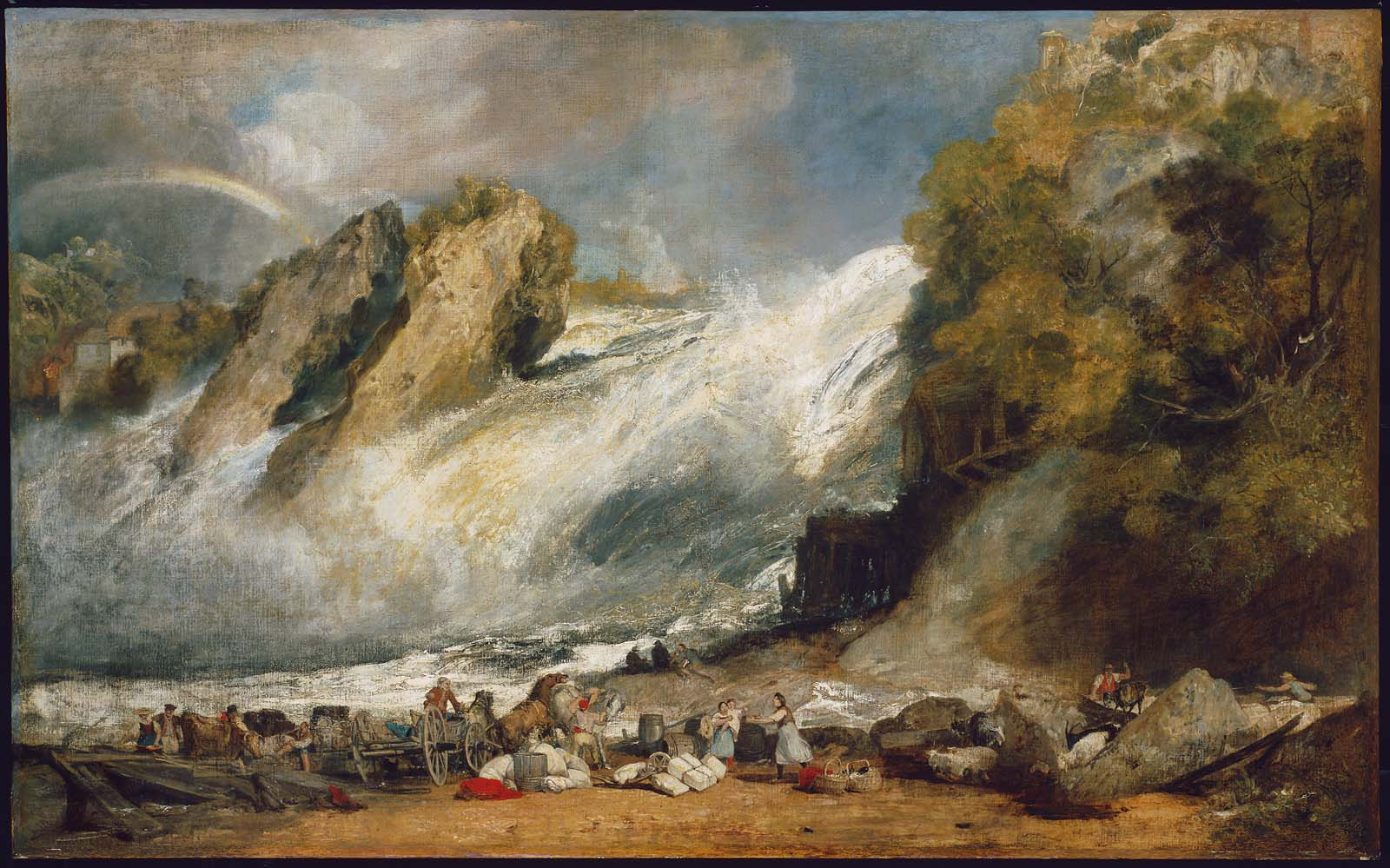
J. M. W. Turner: Fall of the Rhine at Schaffhausen (Museum of Fine Arts, Boston)

Halte dein Herz, o Wanderer, fest in gewaltigen Händen!
Mir entstürzte vor Lust zitternd das meinige fast.
Rastlos donnernde Massen auf donnernde Massen geworfen,
Ohr und Auge, wohin retten sie sich im Tumult?

(Hold your heart, oh traveller, tightly in mighty hands!
Mine nearly collapsed, shivering with pleasure.
Restlessly thundering masses thrown upon thundering masses,
Ear and eye, whither can they save themselves in such an uproar?)

In 1840, author Mary Shelley visited the Falls while on a tour of Europe with her son. She described her visit in a travel narrative that she published in 1844, Rambles in Germany and Italy. She says: "A portion of the cataract arches over the lowest platform, and the spray fell thickly on us, as standing on it and looking up, we saw wave, and rock, and cloud, and the clear heavens through its glittering ever-moving veil. This was a new sight, exceeding anything I had ever before seen; however, not to be wet through, I was obliged quickly to tear myself away."

== Gallery ==
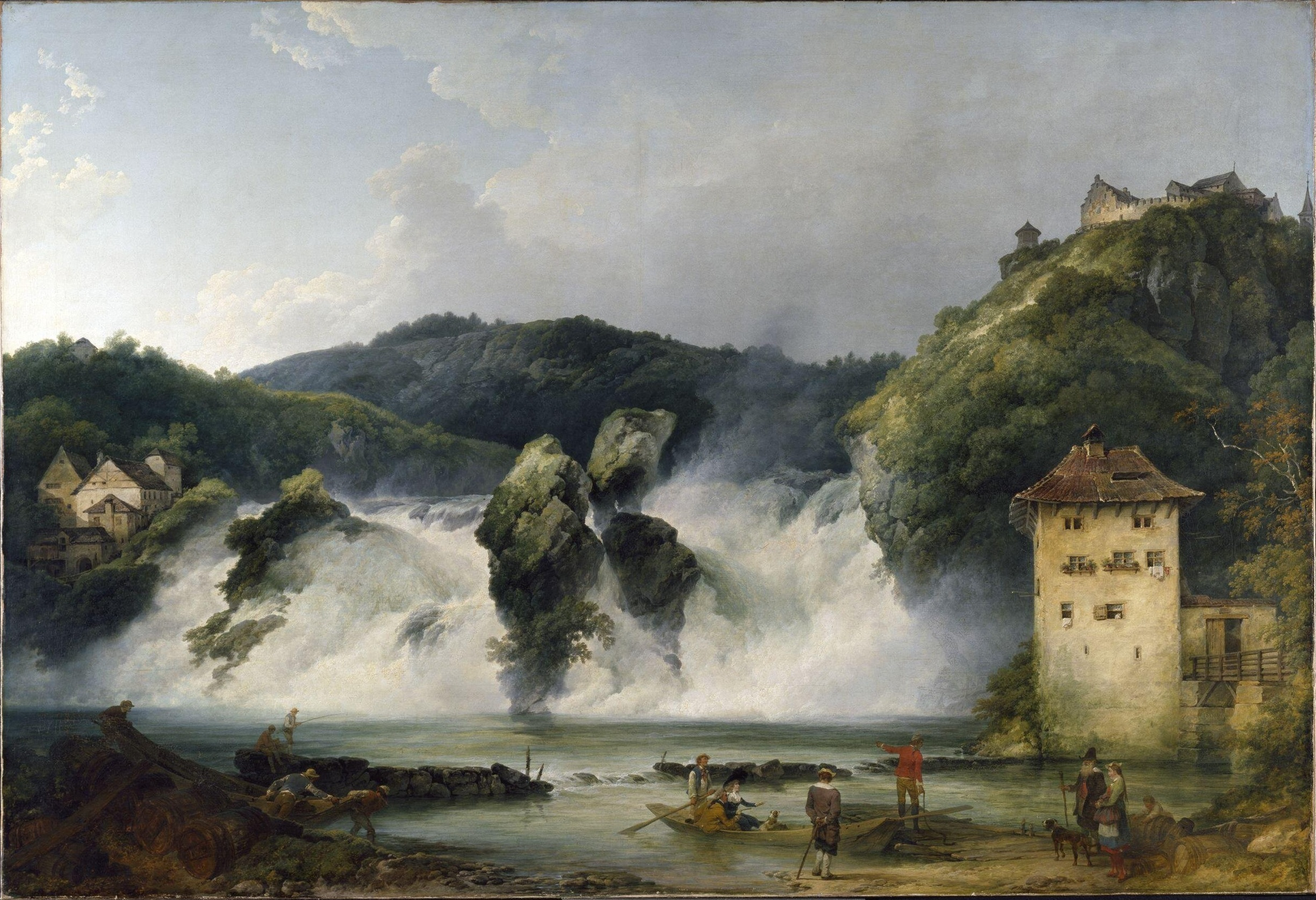
The Falls of the Rhine at Schaffhausen by Philip James de Loutherbourg, 1788

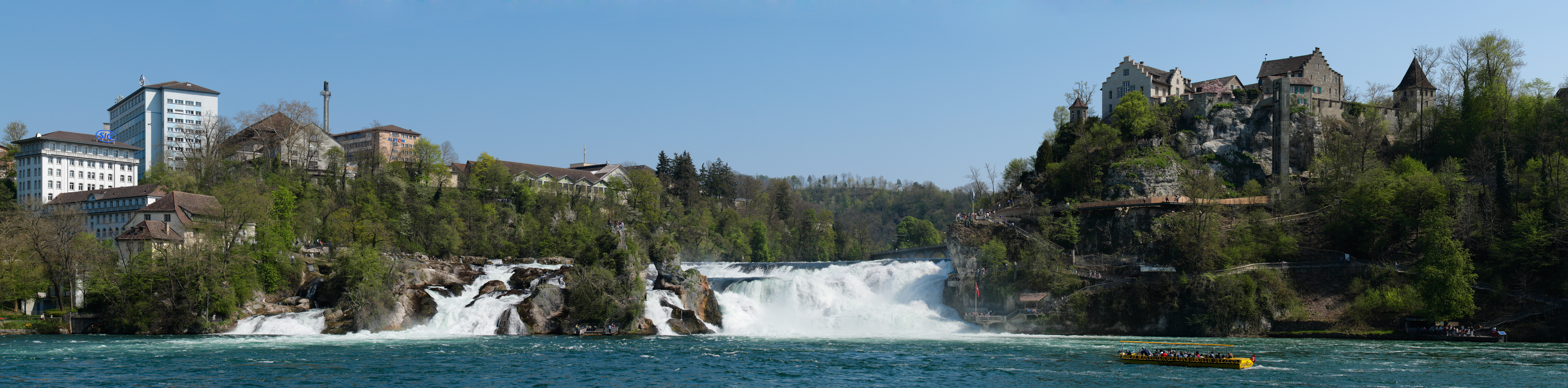
Panorama of the Rhine Falls, April 2010

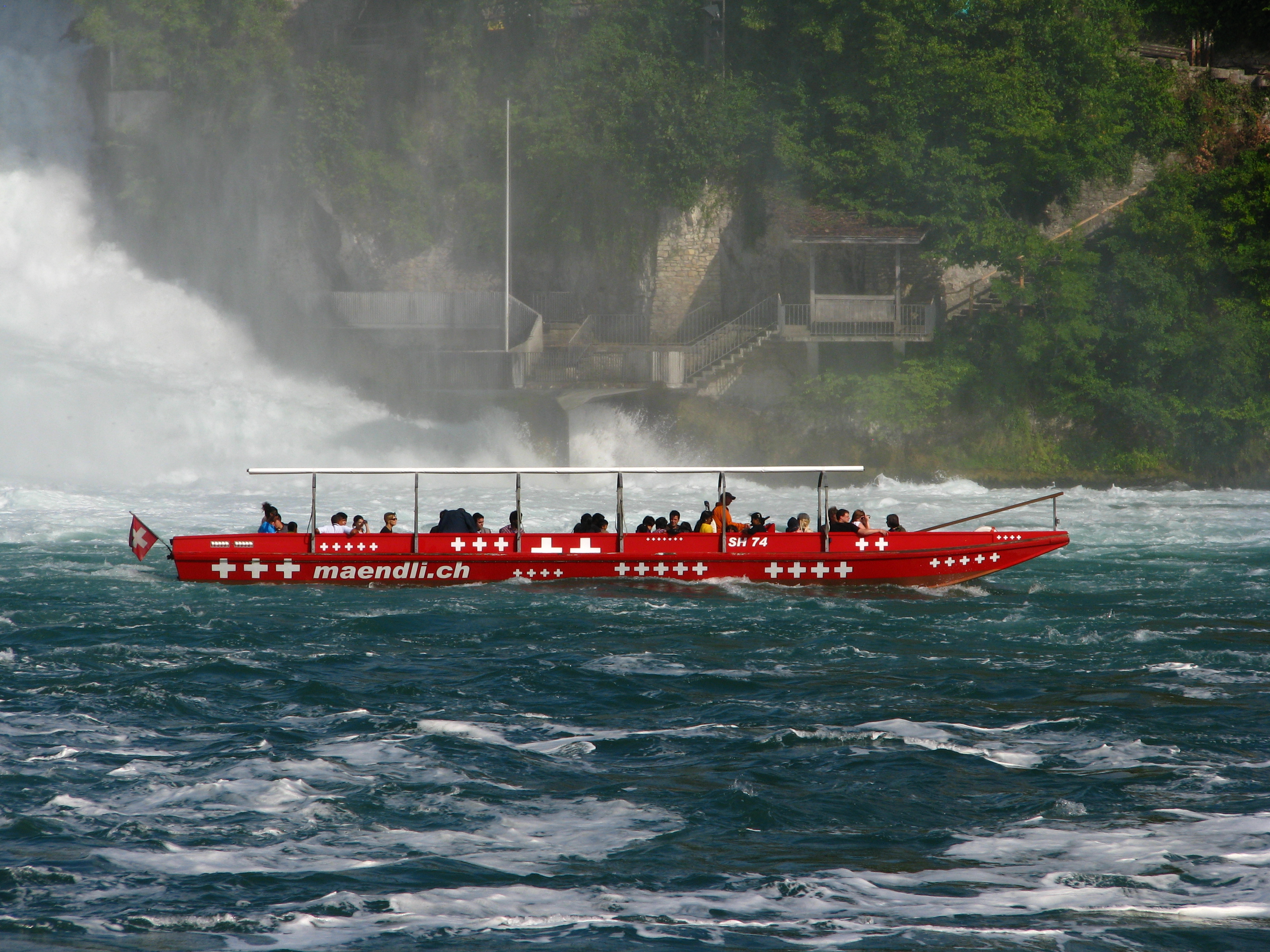
A tourist boat near the falls

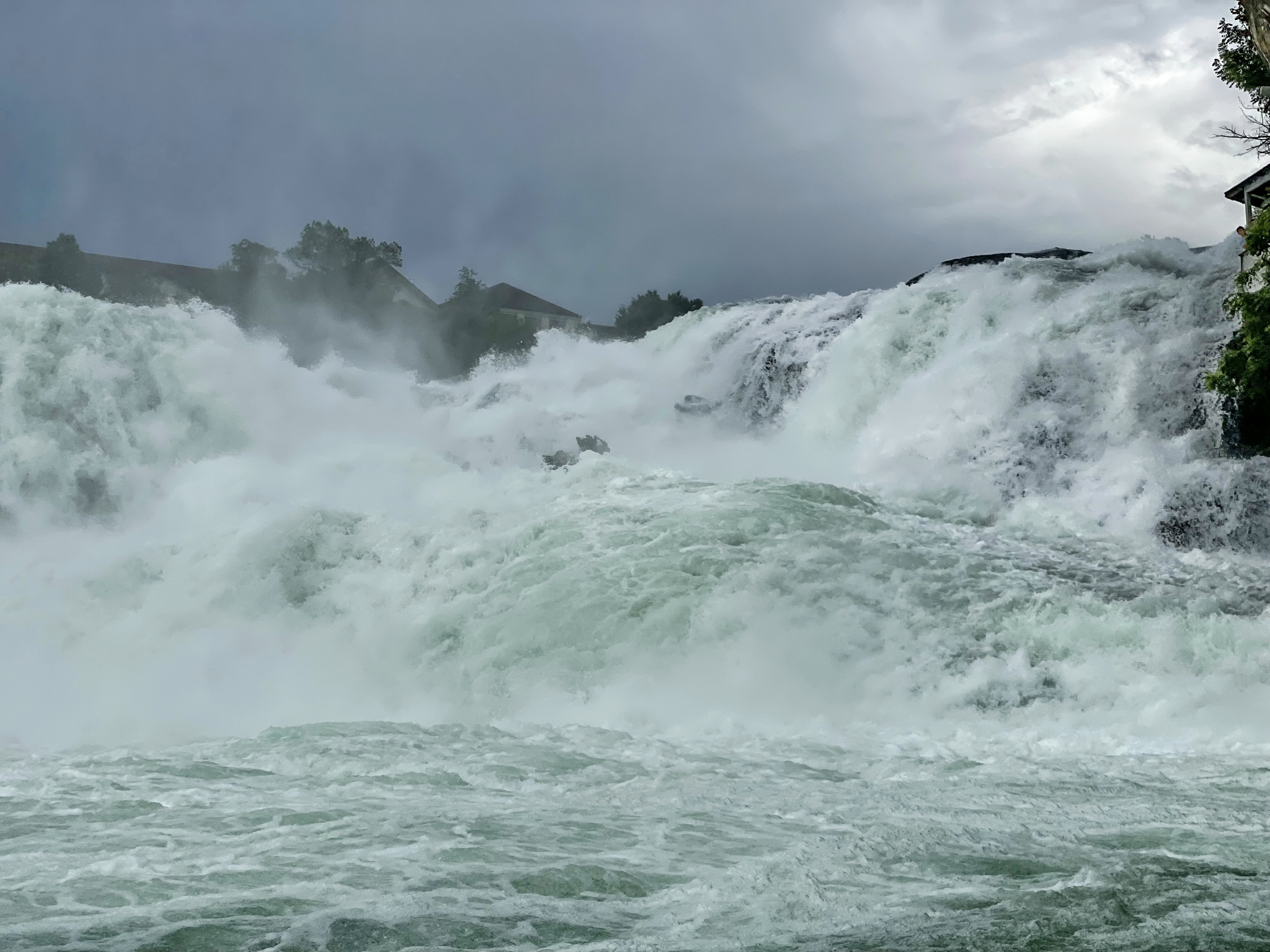
Close-up of the falls.

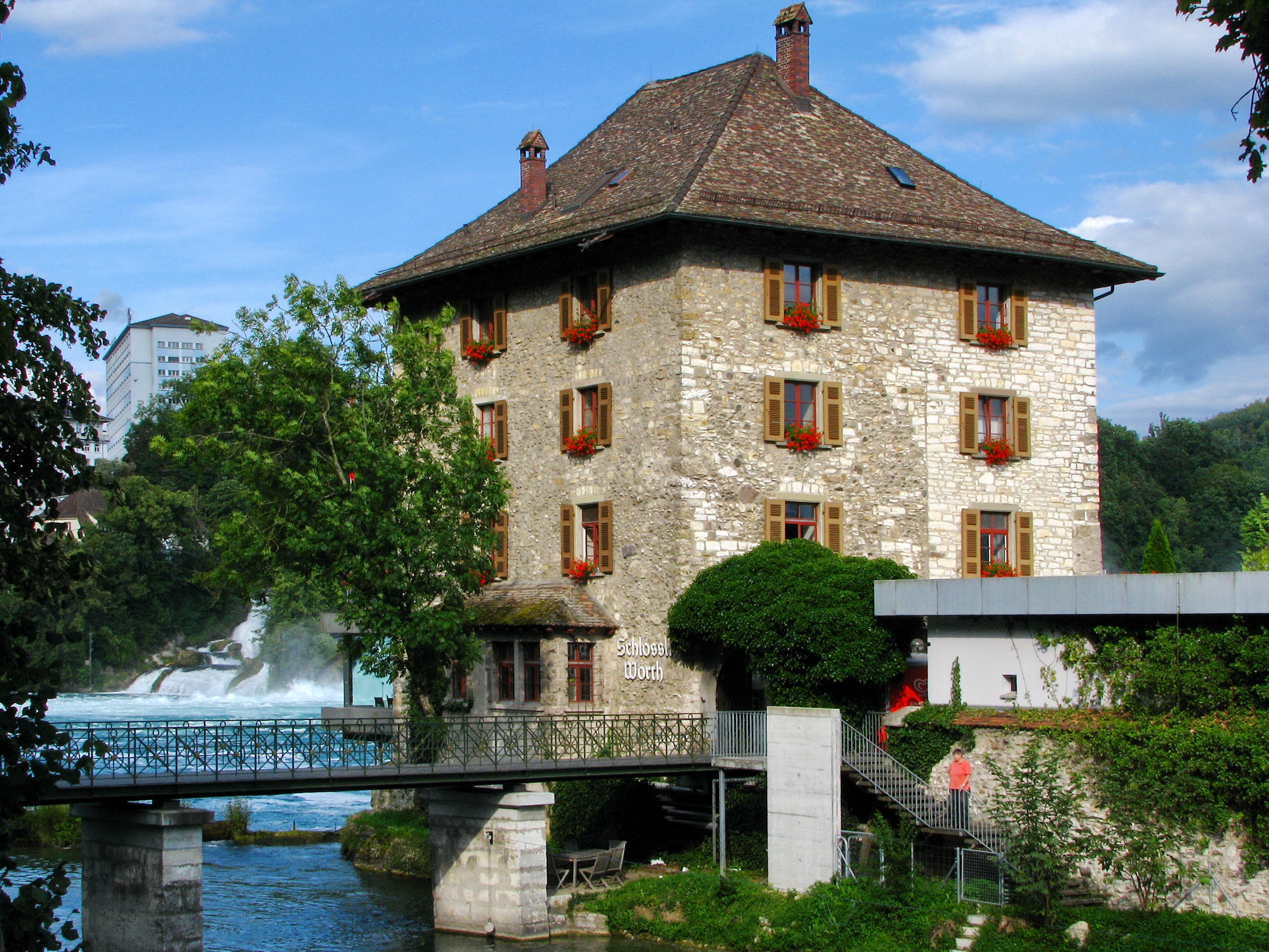
Wörth Castle

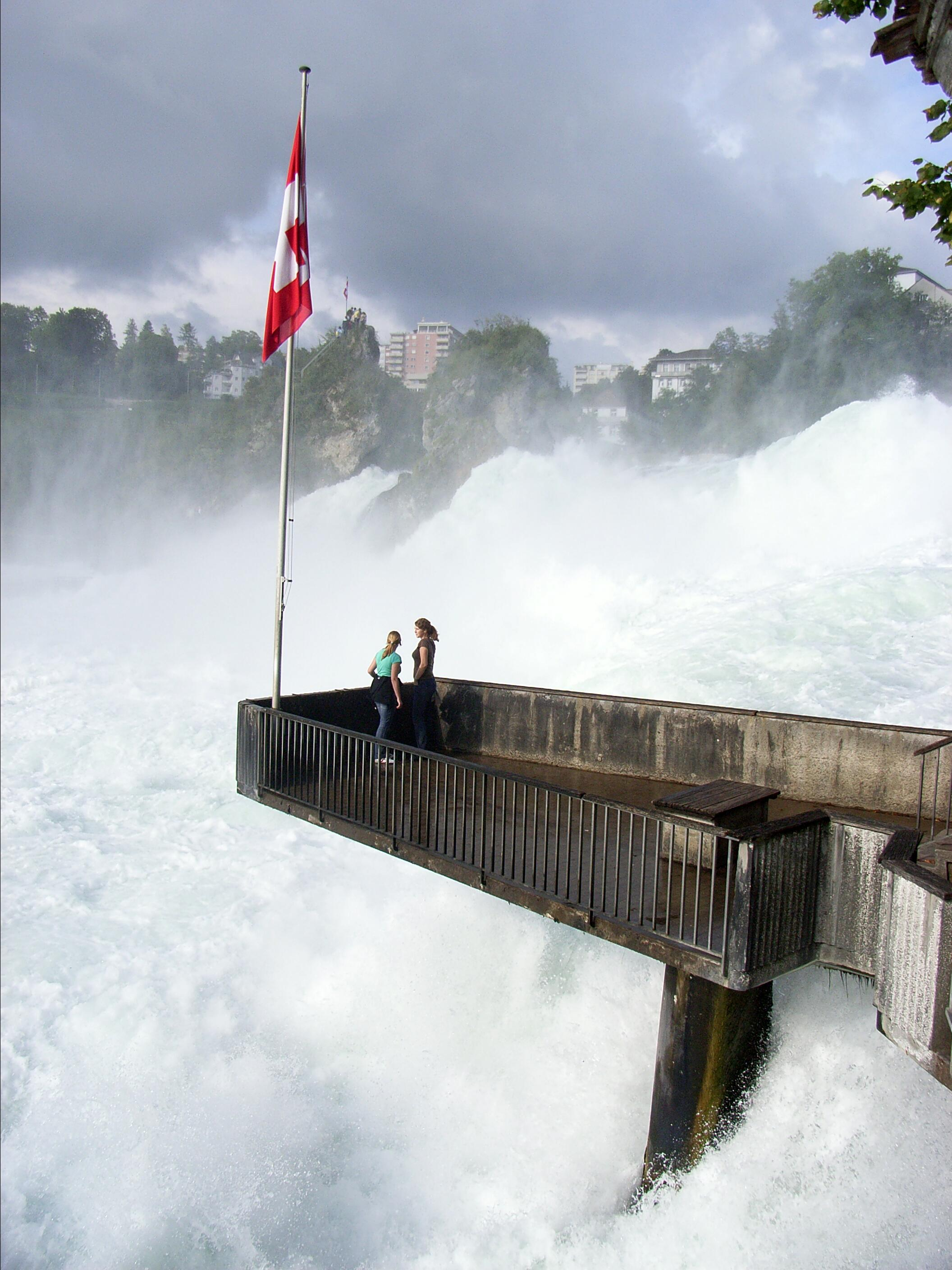
Observation deck on the Zürich side

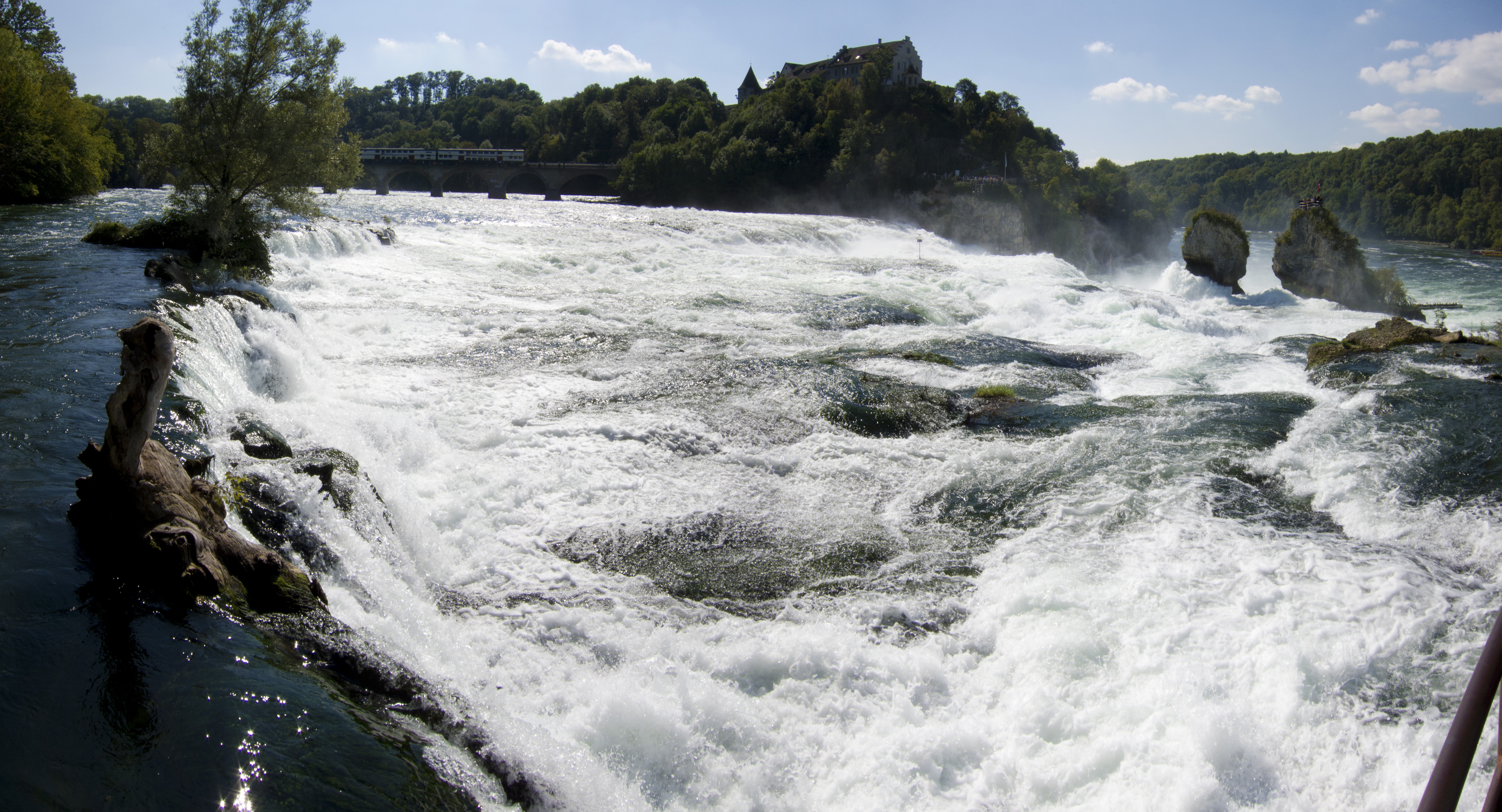
Rheinfall Panorama

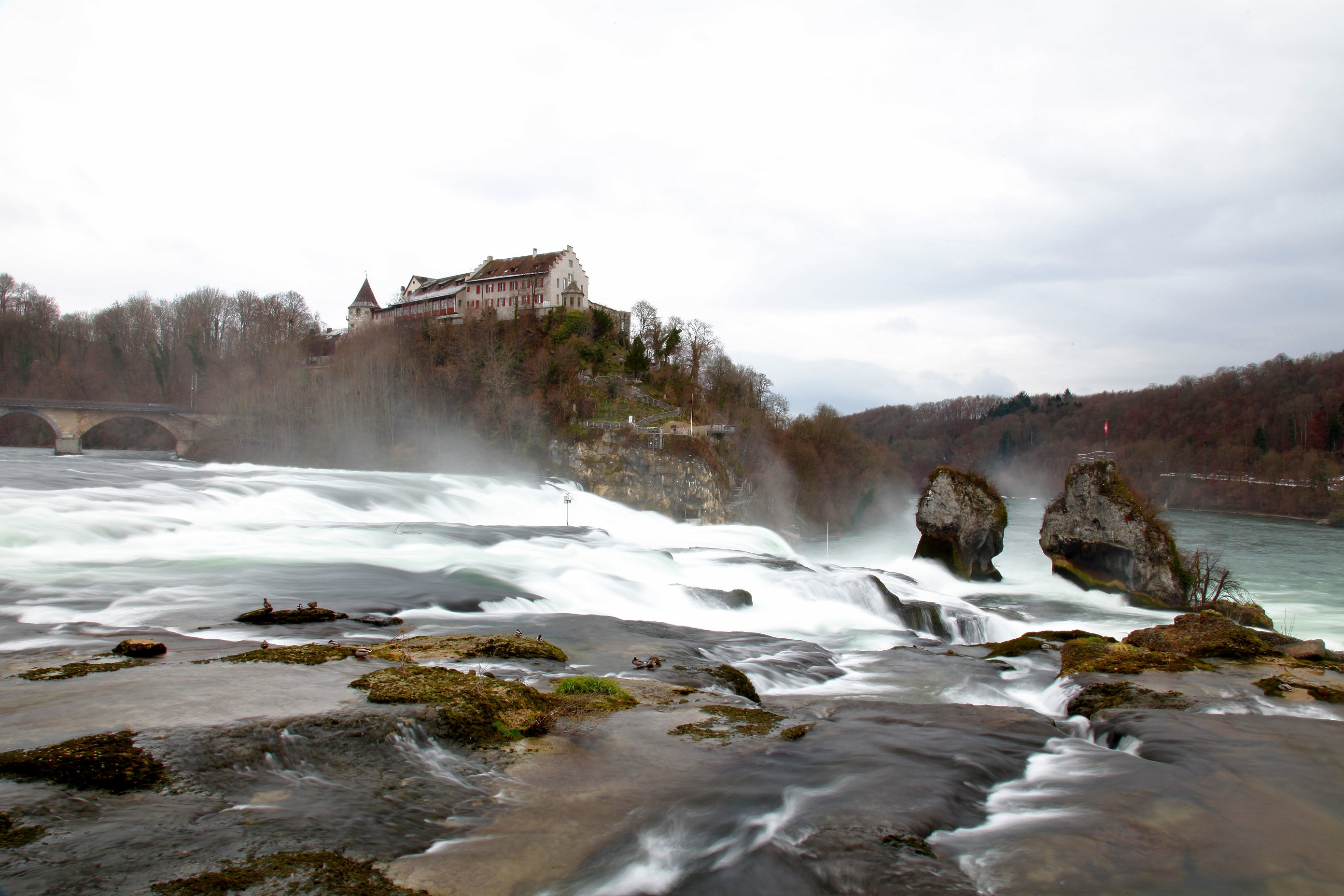
Long exposure photograph of the Rhine Falls with Laufen Castle in the background

== See also ==
- List of rivers of Switzerland
- List of waterfalls
- List of waterfalls by flow rate
- List of waterfalls in Switzerland
- Lists of tourist attractions in Switzerland
