= Wörth Castle =

Schlösschen Wörth
- Schlössli Wörth
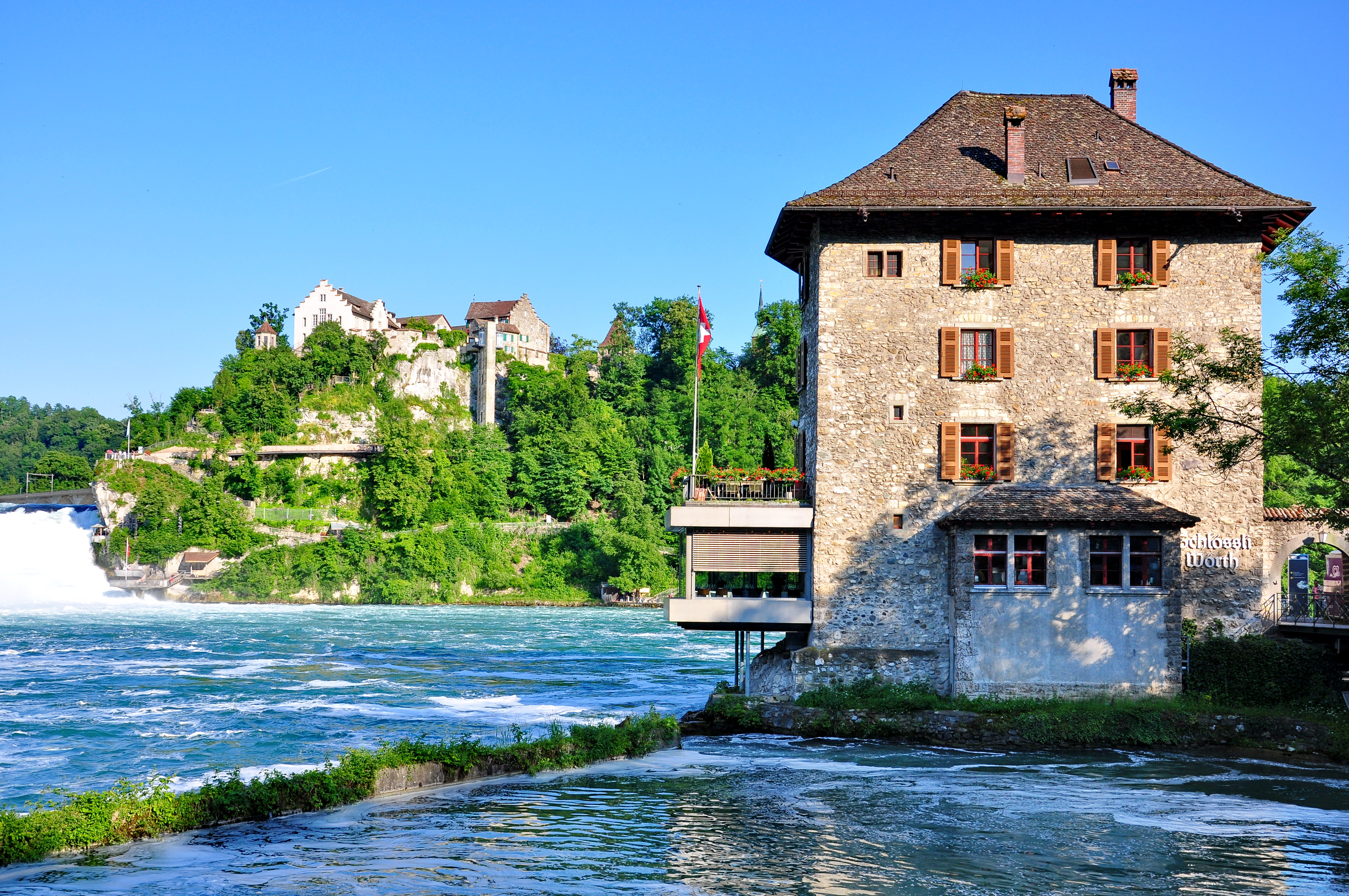
- The Rhine Falls' basin and Laufen Castle as seen from Wörth Castle

- Location within Switzerland Location within Canton of Schaffhausen
- Interactive map of the Schlösschen Wörth area
- Former names: Burg im Fischerhölzli

General information
- Status: Restaurant, shop, fast food point, Rhine boat terminal
- Architectural style: Water castle
- Classification: Historic monument
- Location: Neuhausen am Rheinfall, Switzerland
- Coordinates: 47.676838°N 8.61363°E
- Construction started: 11th century
- Completed: 1348
- Renovated: 1836
- Owner: Canton of Schaffhausen

Design and construction
- Known for: Rhine Falls, former customs station of Kloster Allerheiligen Schaffhausen

The Wörth Castle (German: Schlösschen Wörth, Swiss German: Schlössli Wörth) is a fortification in the municipality of Neuhausen am Rheinfall in the canton of Schaffhausen, Switzerland, located on a small island in the Rhine Falls' basin.

== Geography and name ==
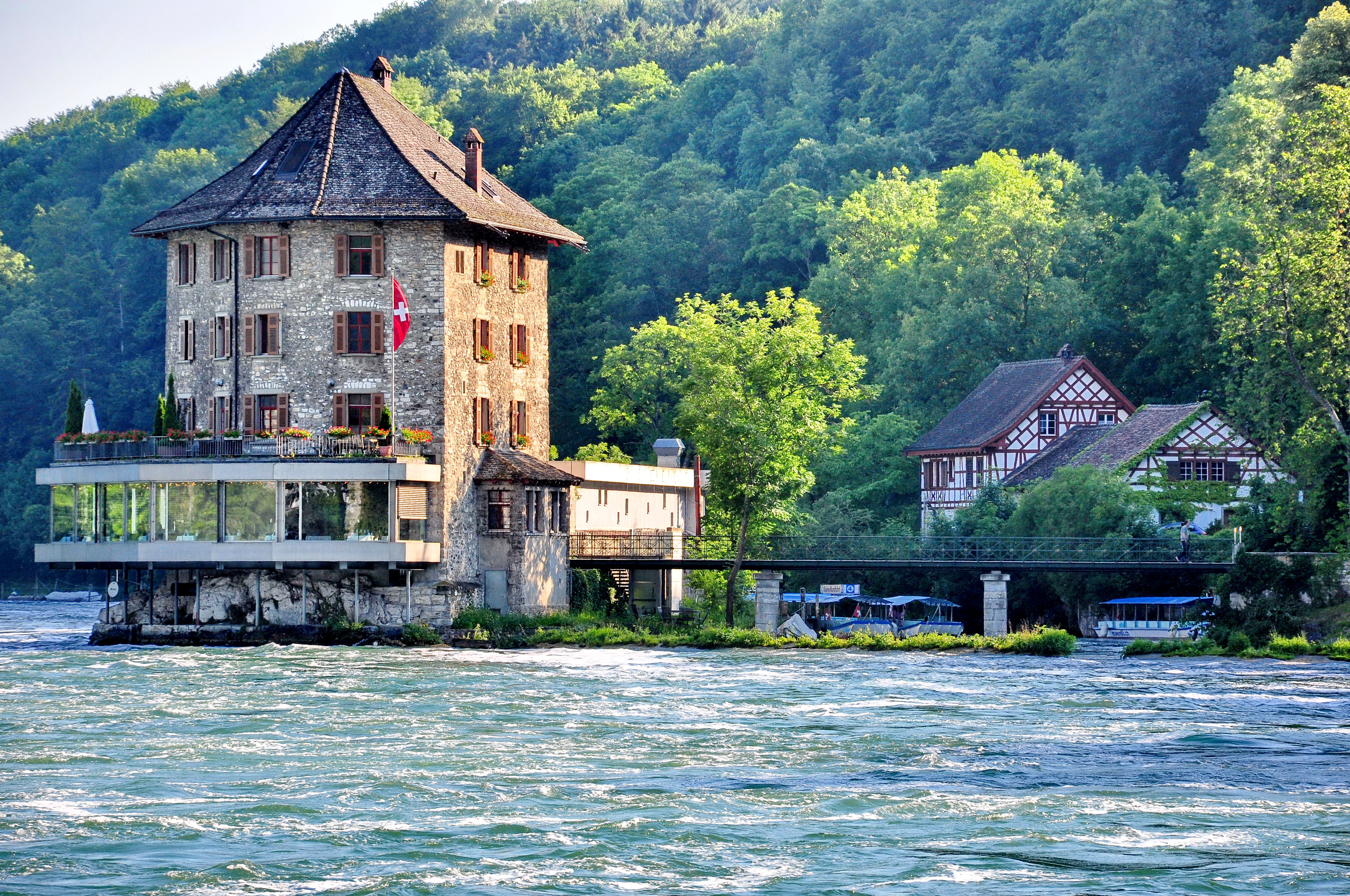
View from the Rhine river

The water castle is located in the plunge pool of the Rhine Falls (Rheinfall), built on a small island in the Rhine river in the municipality of Neuhausen am Rheinfall in the canton of Schaffhausen, opposite of the Laufen Castle in the canton of Zurich. The Schlössli (twee for German Schloss, meaning 'castle') owes its name to the location on a small island, washed by the water of the Rhine Falls, which used to be known as Werd, meaning literally a river island.

== History ==
Wörth was first mentioned in the 13th century AD, serving up to the middle of the 19th century as a major transhipment point on the east-west trade route, that led from Lake Constance (Bodensee) and the city of Basel, and was interrupted by the waterfall.

The present castle was built in 1348 AD, according to the excavations by the archaeological team of the canton of Schaffhausen in 2004. Like the predecessor building, which was built in the mid-11th century as Burg im Fischerhölzli, it served as a customs house and to secure the area, where the goods were transferred to evade the waterfall. Earliest owner of the Habsburg fief were the Herren von Jestetten (lit. 'Lords of Jestetten'), followed by the Schultheiss of Randenburg (1291) and the Herren von Fulach (1422), and in 1429 by the Kloster Allerheiligen Schaffhausen. After the monastery's abolition in 1524, Wörth was a department (Amt) of the city of Schaffhausen.

In the late 1790s, a so-called Gertzler was the custodian of the then Schlösschen Wörth. It was given as a so-called Schupf-Lehn (fief) by the Kloster Allerheiligen in Schaffhausen along with the salmon fisheries, customs, vineyard, forest etc. The Gertzler moved the customs for the monastery and had to deliver 2/3 of the salmon catch. For subsistence, he was allowed to fell timber out of the forest, and had to pay a lease of 30 Thaler per year for the use of the vineyard and the fields. The term Schlupf-Lehn derives from the Swiss German word for "slide out", as the feudal hereditary could be revoked if the administrator did not meet its obligations to the monastery.

When the railways was built, the water traffic route lost its importance, and the canton of Schaffhausen rebuilt the building as a restaurant in 1835/36. The former customs station and salmon farming was converted to the tourism promotional restaurant «Caffé- und Speisewirtschaft Schlösschen Wörth», that was opened on 2 February 1837 (Candlemas). The construction costs for the renovation had to be paid by the former owner, the Kloster Allerheiligen in Schaffhausen.

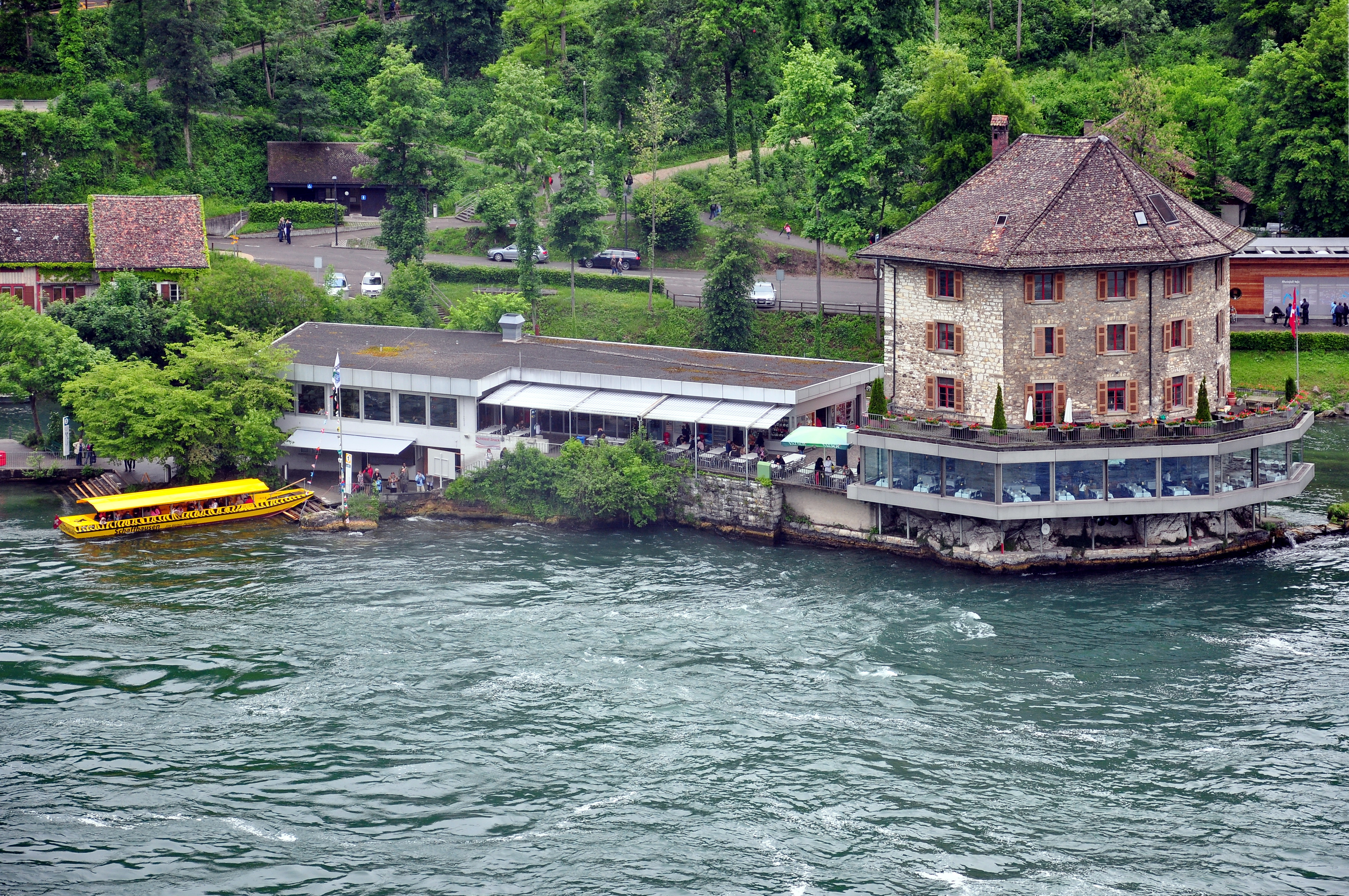
Wörth as seen from nearby the Laufen Castle

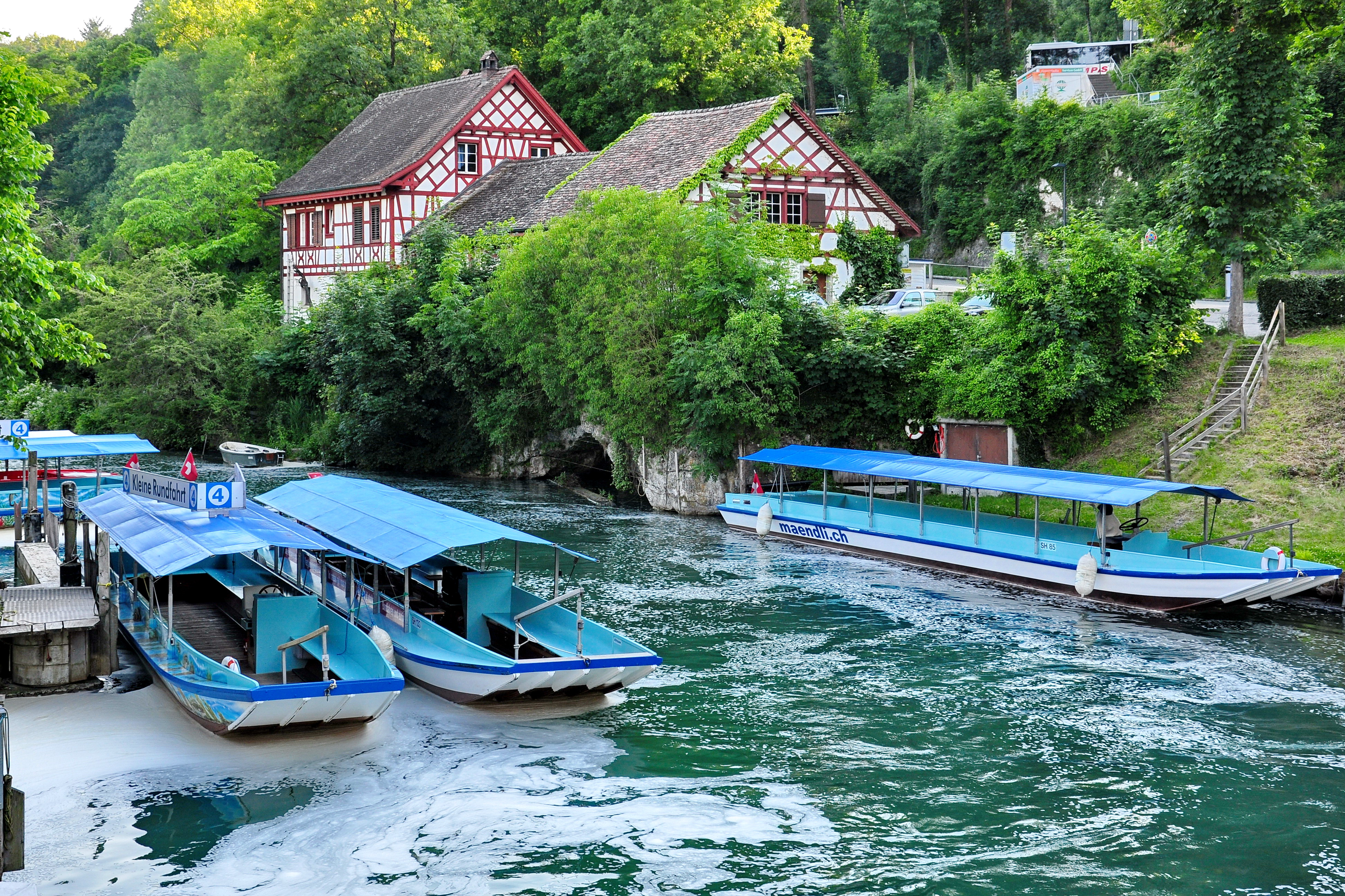

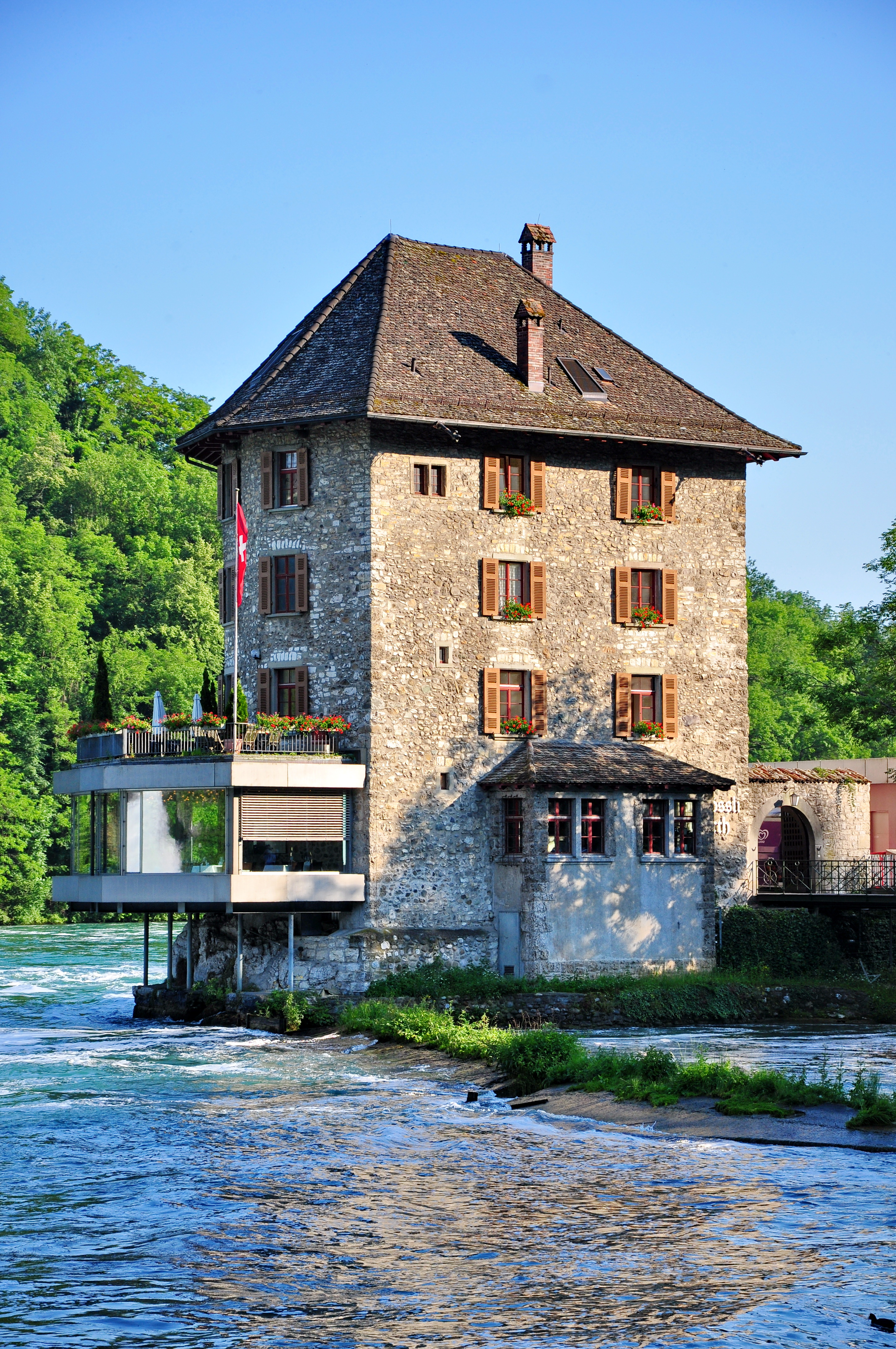

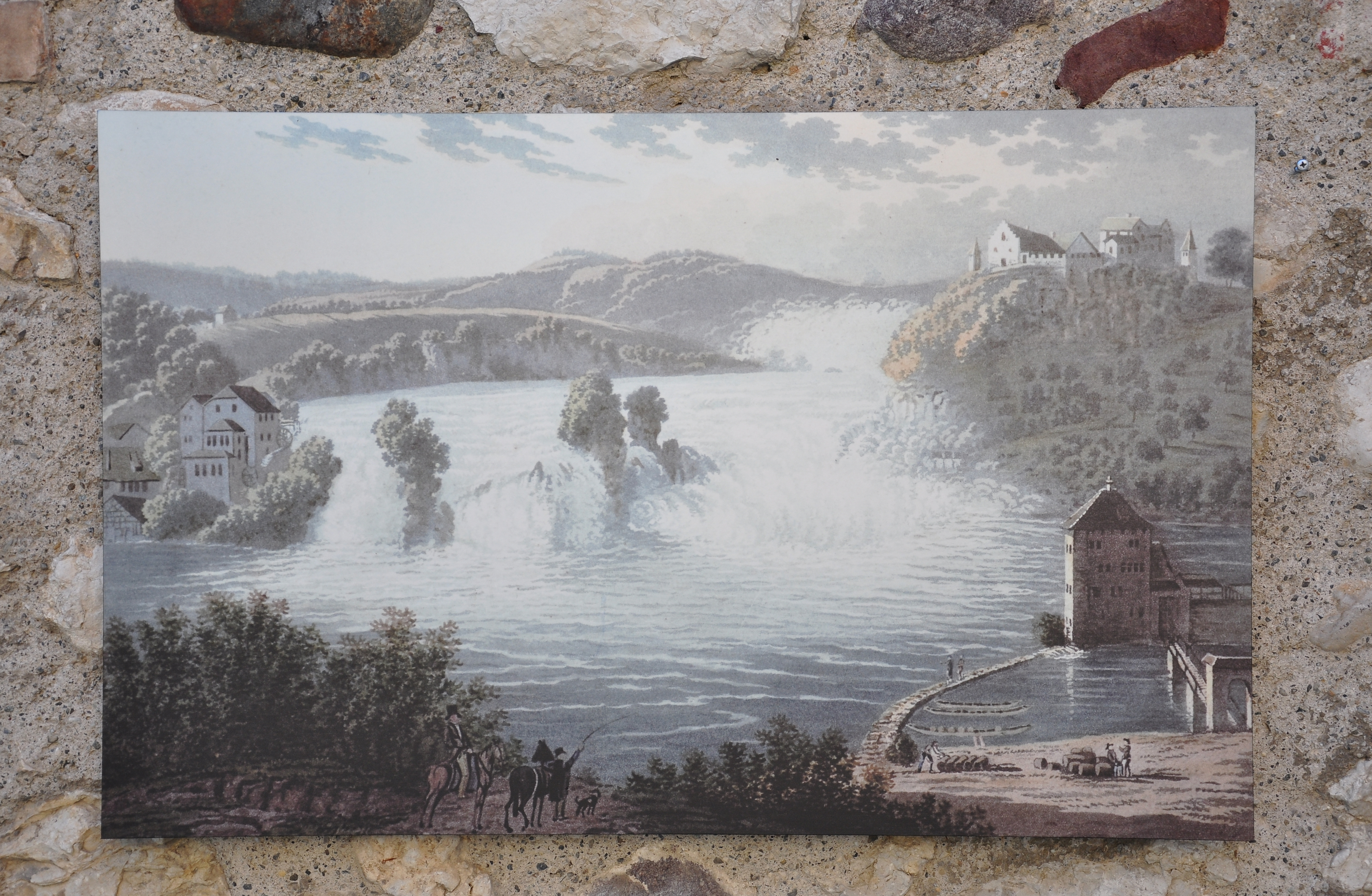
historic view

== Architecture ==
A bridge was leading from the righthand shore of the Rhine river into the ring the walled courtyard. On the north side a palace-like building was built, whose third floor consisted of a cantilevered clerestory timber. In 1621, a stone floor replaced the clerestory. New floors were added, new windows broken, and the ring wall and gate was broken. As of today it houses the restaurant Schlössli Wörth that claims to be a gourmet restaurant, and also a gift shop and a fast food joint, connected with a terrace and a brilliant view of the Rhine Falls. Wörth is also the starting point of the tour boats.

== Trivia ==
The castle was mentioned in the diary of Goethe on 18 September 1797, Schlösschen Wörth: Ich ging hinein, um ein Glas Wein zu trinken. Alter Eindruck bey Erblickung des Mannes ... Goethe asked the custodian (Gertzler) about his work and documented the then conditions.

== Cultural heritage ==
The building is listed in the Swiss inventory of cultural property of national and regional significance as a Class B object of regional importance.

== See also ==
- List of castles and fortresses in Switzerland
- List of restaurants in Switzerland
