= Neue Helvetische Gesellschaft =

Swiss political movement

The Neue Helvetische Gesellschaft (NHG) / "New Helvetic Society") was a non-party political movement in Switzerland, founded in 1914 and subsumed into a successor organisation in 2007. Its originating objectives were to overcome the country’s national differences, preserve national independence and to resist materialism. In the 1930s, it became more focused on “national renewal”.

In 1912 the three (by origin francophone) writers Robert de Traz, Alexis François and Gonzague de Reynold produced a manifesto entitled "Pro helvetica dignitate ac securitate" ("For Swiss dignity and Security”) in which they called for the creation of such a society. It was founded in the capital, Bern, in 1914. Groups sprang up quickly in other Swiss cities, including Lausanne, Neuchâtel and Zürich. There were also foreign societies set up by expatriate Swiss communities in Berlin, Paris and London. The name “Neue Helvetische Gesellschaft” was a conscious reference to the "Helvetische Gesellschaft (“Helvetic Society”) which had played an important role promoting reform in Switzerland during the eighteenth century.

From the beginning, the club had more than one objective. It promoted multi-lingualism, heritage preservation and the diversity of the countryside. It was in the first instance an association of writers, journalists and academics. It was initially centred on the French-speaking western cantons of the country which had always been perceived as more socially progressive than the conservative German-speaking cantons, but it also gained support from German-speakers including entrepreneurs and politicians. In 1914 it acquired nationwide exposure as a result of a speech given by the high-profile poet Carl Spitteler and entitled "Unser Schweizer Standpunkt" (literally "Our Swiss Standpoint"). By 1915 membership had risen to 1,460. A move to admit women was rejected in 1916, but the decision was reversed two years later, and from 1918 The Society even admitted female members. NHG Membership peaked in 1920 at 2,540.

Following the First World War (from which Switzerland abstained) the NHG launched a successful campaign for the country to enter the League of Nations. In the early 1930s it supported the Neue Front. Later, in 1952, it campaigned energetically and effectively to block the creation of a massive hydro-electric power station at the Rhine Falls near Schaffhausen.

In 2007, the society merged with "Rencontres Suisses"/"Treffpunkt Schweiz" ("Swiss Meeting point"): since then the resulting entity has borne the name "Neue Helvetische Gesellschaft-Treffpunkt Schweiz (NHG-TS)".
