= Otto Spoerri =

Otto Spoerri (1933–2008) was a Swiss accountant who happened upon one of the most powerful positions in Hollywood.

Spoerri, who started as a temporary accountant at The Academy of Motion Picture Arts and Sciences inherited the two sensitive roles of distributing tickets to The Oscars and making the seating arrangements. Spoerri, who retired in 2002, died at his home in Switzerland after suffering a stroke.
