= Theophil Spoerri =

Swiss writer and academic (1890–1974)

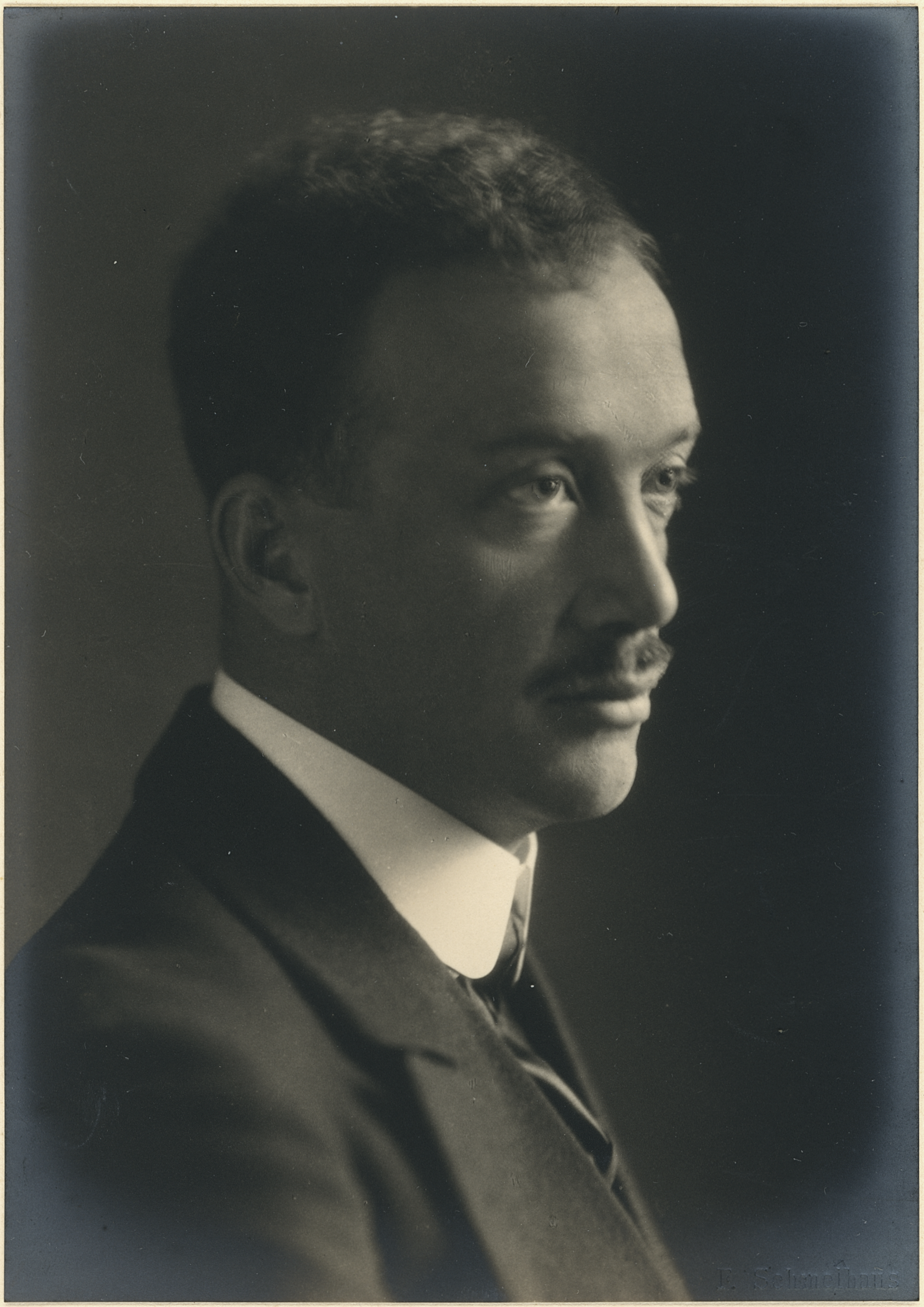
- Born: 10 June 1890 La Chaux-de-Fonds, Neuchâtel, Switzerland
- Died: 24 December 1974 (aged 84) Caux, Vaud, Switzerland
- Occupation: Writer and academic

Theophil Spoerri (10 June 1890, in La Chaux-de-Fonds – 24 December 1974, in Caux), was a Swiss writer and academic.

== Family ==
Theophil Spoerri was the son of a Methodist Preacher called Jakob Gottlieb Spoerri and of his wife Maria Eugenie Thiele/Spoerri.

He had a cousin, also named Theophil Spörri (1887 – 1955) who was a prominent Swiss Methodist theologian and with whom he is sometimes confused.

He had a nephew, from his mother's side of the family, called Daniel Isaac Feinstein. When the boy was 11 his father was arrested and killed. Daniel was then adopted by his uncle Theophil Spoerri and changed his name to Daniel Spoerri. Daniel Spoerri subsequently gained prominence as an artist.

== Professional biography ==
Spoerri studied at Zürich, Siena and Paris. He obtained his doctorate at Bern in 1916. His dissertation was published in Milan in 1918 under the Italian-language title “Il dialetto della Valsesia” (”The dialect of Valsesia”). Between 1912 and 1922 he worked as a high school teacher in Bern.

Between 1922 and 1956 he was an Associate Professor of Romance Philology at the University of Zurich where his students included the future novelist Max Frisch. In respect of university administration he was made Dean in 1932, and university Rector between 1948 and 1950. Between 1942 and 1951, together with his colleague Professor Emil Staiger, he produced a quarterly publication entitled “Trivium. Schweizerische Vierteljahresschrift für Literaturwissenschaft und Stilkritik” (”Trivium: Swiss quarterly journal for literary knowledge and criticism“)

Spoerri held an honorary doctorate from the University of Geneva (1950). He published several essays on Dante Alighieri, and was a holder of the Golden Dante-Medal (Florence 1962).

Spoerri's religious upbringing gave him a powerful religious, social and political commitment. In 1940 he joined with others to form an anti-Nazi organisation called the Gotthard League, becoming its first president. He was also a member of the Neue Helvetische Gesellschaft (New Helvetic Society) and of the Oxford Group along with the Moral Re-Armament movement that grew out of it.

The strong religious element in his make-up was also apparent in his academic research work which covered writers such as Blaise Pascal, Jean Racine, Dante Alighieri, Ludovico Ariosto und Torquato Tasso.

== Works ==
- Renaissance und Barock bei Ariost und Tasso. Versuch einer Anwendung Wölfflin'scher Kunstbetrachtung, Bern 1922
- Von der dreifachen Wurzel der Poesie, Zürich/Leipzig 1925
- Die drei Wege des Erkennens in Wissenschaft, Dichtung und Offenbarung, Berlin 1926
- Französische Metrik, München 1929
- Die Götter des Abendlandes : Eine Auseinandersetzung mit dem Heidentum in der Kultur unserer Zeit, Berlin 1930
- Einführung in die Göttliche Komödie, Zürich 1946
- Grundkräfte der europäischen Geschichte : Wie die Welt von Grund auf anders werden könnte, Hamburg 1951
- Die Struktur der Existenz : Einführung in die Kunst der Interpretation, Zürich 1951
- Der Weg zur Form : Dasein und Verwirklichung des Menschen im Spiegel der europäischen Dichtung, Hamburg 1954
- Der verborgene Pascal. Eine Einführung in das Denken Pascals als Philosophie für den Menschen von morgen, Hamburg 1955
- Kleines Präludium zur Poesie : vom Geheimnis des Schönen und von den Grenzen der Poesie, Hamburg 1957
- Dante und die europäische Literatur : Das Bild des Menschen in der Struktur der Sprache, Stuttgart 1963
- Dynamik aus der Stille. Die Aktualität Frank Buchmans, Luzern/Wuppertal 1971

== Reading list (mostly in German) ==
- Überlieferung und Gestaltung : Festgabe für Theophil Spoerri zum 60. Geburtstag am 10. Juni 1950, Zürich 1950
- Das Trecento : Italien im 14. Jahrhundert. [Von] Hans Conrad Peyer, Konrad Huber, Reto R. Bezzola, Peter Meyer, Walter Rüegg, Kurt von Fischer (Ringvorlesung, gehalten an der Philosophischen Fakultät I der Universität Zürich im Wintersemester 1959/60. Theophil Spoerri zum 70. Geburtstag), Zürich 1961
- Theophil Spoerri persönlich. Lettres à sa famille et ses amis, hrsg. von Pierre Spoerri, 1975
- Pierre Spoerri [*1926], Mein Vater und sein Jüngster. Theophil Spoerri in seiner Zeit, Stäfa 2002 - ISBN 3857171448
- Christian Baertschi in: Historisches Lexikon der Schweiz s.v.
