= Defeatism =

Acceptance of defeat without a struggle

Defeatism is the acceptance of defeat without struggle, often with negative connotations. It can be linked to pessimism in psychology, and may sometimes be used synonymously with fatalism or determinism.

In politics, defeatism is used for one's perceived cooperation with the opposition party. In wartime and on the front lines of war, defeatism is synonymous with treason. The term covers soldiers who refuse to fight or voice doubt about the national policy of their own faction.

== History ==
The term defeatism is commonly used in politics as a descriptor for an ideological stance that considers cooperation with the opposition party. In the military context, in wartime, and especially on the front lines, defeatism is viewed as synonymous with treason. Under military law, a soldier can be accused of being defeatist if the soldier refuses to fight by voicing doubt of the ideological validity of national policy; thus, existential questions such as "Is the war already lost?" and "Is the fight worth the effort?" are defeatism that connote advocacy of an alternative end to the war other than military victory.

== In Nazi Germany ==
Defeatism became a buzzword in Germany following its capitulation in 1918, particularly among the Nazi Party led by Adolf Hitler, who routinely blamed this loss on a "defeatist mentality". After seizing power, his obsession with denouncing opponents for "defeatism" grew more acute as time went on, and was widely noted. During World War II, Hitler unexpectedly dismissed many generals for defeatism. More prudent military commanders such as Field Marshal Albert Kesselring felt constrained to present the Führer a rosier account of the battlefront situation than was realistic, to avoid being labeled "defeatist".

During the last year of war, the German Volksgerichtshof ("people's court") executed many people accused of defeatist talks or acts, and their names were announced weekly in a pink colored poster pasted on billboards around the country. In March 1945, as Red Army tanks were closing in on Berlin, Nazi officials worked feverishly to suppress "cowardice and defeatism" in their own ranks with summary death sentences.

== Revolutionary defeatism ==
Revolutionary defeatism is a related idea, made most prominent by Vladimir Lenin, that establishes that the proletariat cannot win or gain in a capitalist war. According to Lenin, the true enemy of the proletariat is the imperialist leaders who send their lower classes into battle. Workers would gain more from their own nations' defeats, he argued, if the war could be turned into civil war and then international revolution.

According to political scientist Baruch Knei-Paz, Leon Trotsky's theory of "permanent revolution" was misrepresented by Stalin as defeatist and adventurist during the succession struggle; Knei-Paz writes that in fact Trotsky encouraged revolutions in Europe but did not propose "reckless confrontations" with the capitalist world.

== See also ==
- Acquiescence
- Learned helplessness
