= Verkehrsbetriebe Schaffhausen =

Swiss public transport company

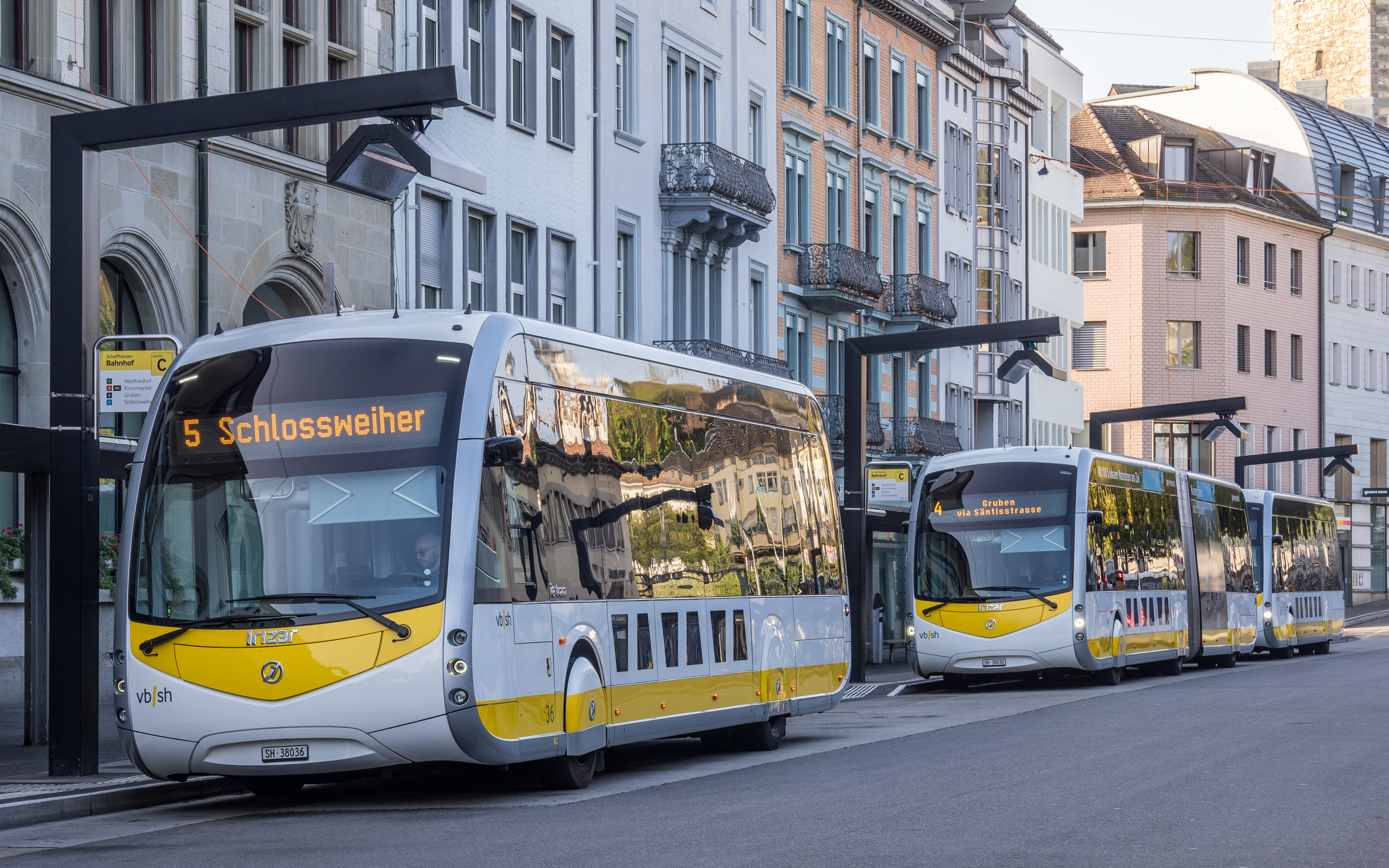
- Irizar battery-electric buses in Schaffhausen in 2023
- Founded: 1 January 2019
- Locale: Canton of Schaffhausen
- Service type: Battery electric bus
- Routes: 16
- Fleet: Irizar IE Tram; Hess Niederflur; Mercedes-Benz Citaro 2
- Annual ridership: 11.7 million (2022)
- Website: www.vbsh.ch

Verkehrsbetriebe Schaffhausen (lit. 'Schaffhausen transport company') (VBSH, stylised as vbsh) is a public transport company in the Swiss canton of Schaffhausen. It operates bus lines covering the city of Schaffhausen and the surrounding canton, with one regional bus line passing through German territory. It also operated the Schaffhausen trolleybus system until its closure in December 2025.

== Lines ==
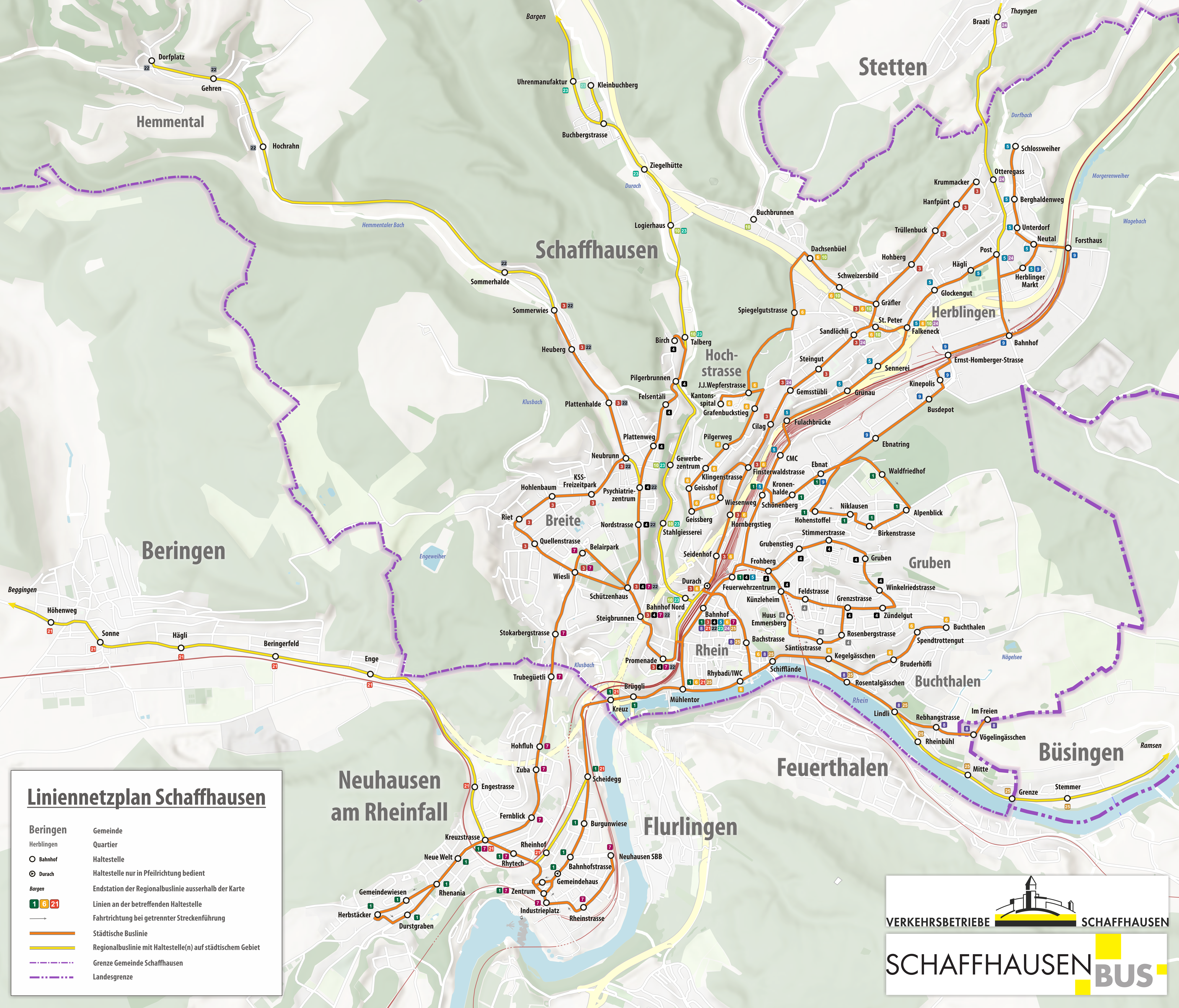
Urban bus routes (1, 3–10) of VBSH in Schaffhausen and Neuhausen am Rheinfall as of December 2025

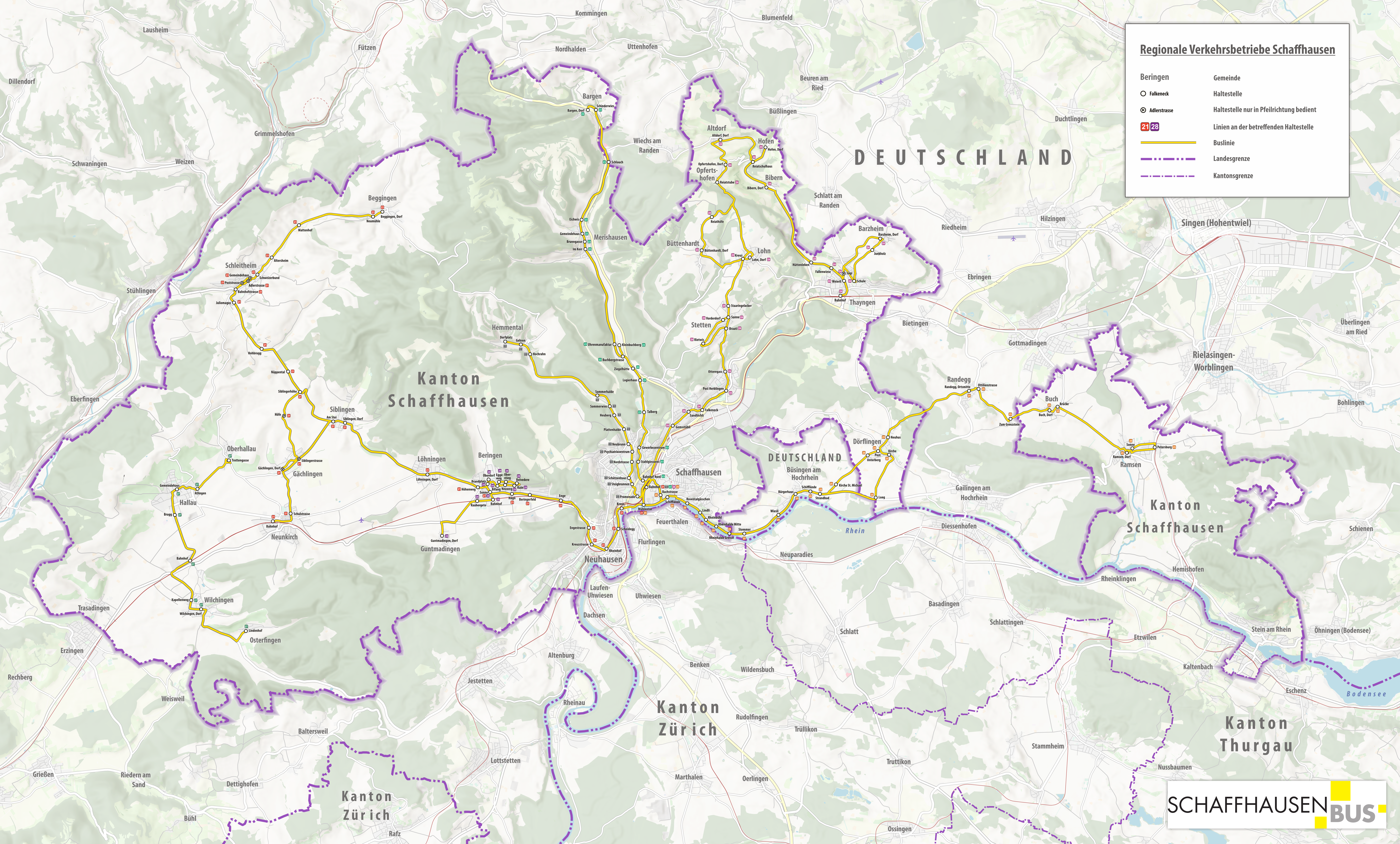
Regional bus routes (21–25, 27, 28) of VBSH as of December 2023

With the exception of bus routes 9, 27 and 28, all services stop in the forecourt of Schaffhausen railway station. Line 9 stops next to Herblingen railway station, line 27 next to Wilchingen-Hallau railway station and line 28 next to Beringen Badischer Bahnhof. The urban bus routes call at stations in the municipalities of Schaffhausen and Neuhausen am Rheinfall. Route 25 crosses the Swiss–German border four times in one journey.

At Schaffhausen railway station, there are connections to long-distance and regional trains. Other railway stations in the canton with nearby bus stops are only served by regional trains. Schifflände bus stop is adjacent to the landing stage of URh boat lines.

As of the December 2024 timetable change, Verkehrsbetriebe Schaffhausen operates sixteen routes:

=== Urban ===
- 1: Neuhausen Herbstäcker – Schaffhausen (station) – Ebnat – Waldfriedhof
- 3: Sommerwies – Schützenhaus – Schaffhausen (station) – Krummacker
- 4: Birch – Schützenhaus – Schaffhausen (station) – Künzleheim (Munot) – Gruben
- 5: Schaffhausen station – Schlossweiher (Herblingen)
- 6: Buchthalen – Schifflände – Schaffhausen (station) – Spital – Falkeneck
- 7: Schaffhausen (station) – Schützenhaus – Neuhausen (station)
- 8: Schaffhausen (station) – Schifflände – Im Freien
- 9: Ebnat– Herblingen (station) – Einkaufszentren
- 10: Schaffhausen Bhf. Nord (station) – Logierhaus – Falkeneck

=== Regional ===
- 21: Schaffhausen – Neuhausen am Rheinfall – Beringerfeld – Löhningen – Siblingen ( – Gächlingen – Neunkirch – Gächlingen) – Schleitheim – Beggingen
- 22: Schaffhausen – Hemmental
- 23: Schaffhausen – Merishausen – Bargen
- 24: Schaffhausen – Stetten – Lohn – Büttenhardt – Opfertshofen – Altdorf – Hofen – Bibern – Barzheim – Thayngen
- 25: Schaffhausen – Schifflände – Stemmer – Büsingen am Hochrhein – Dörflingen – Randegg – Murbach – Buch – Ramsen
- 27: Oberhallau – Hallau – Wilchingen-Hallau – Wilchingen – Osterfingen
- 28: Beringen – Beringen Bad Bf – Guntmadingen

== Fleet ==
As of 2022, Verkehrsbetriebe Schaffhausen owned a fleet of 69 vehicles, comprising 15 battery-electric buses built by Irizar, 7 trolleybuses built by Hess and 47 diesel-powered buses built by Mercedes-Benz (of which 25 operate as regional buses).

=== Electrification ===
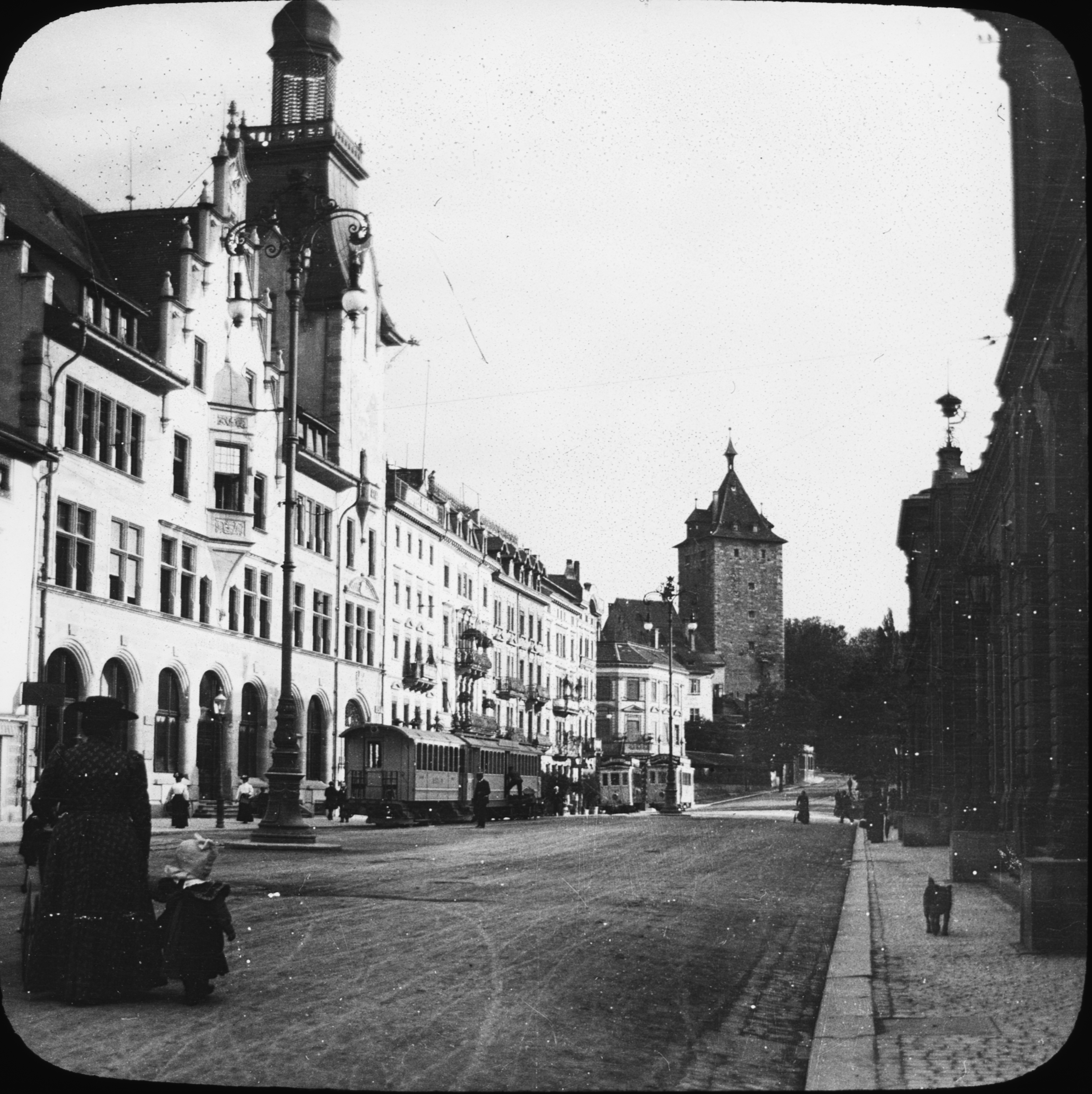
Forecourt of Schaffhausen station with trams in 1906

It is intended to replace all diesel-powered buses currently operating within the city with battery-electric buses in the near future. The preconditions in Schaffhausen are useful for the operation of an electric bus fleet. The advantages are twofold:

- The twelve charging stations are located in the forecourt of Schaffhausen railway station, which is at or near the lowest point of altitude on most routes, while the terminal bus stops are situated higher up on the surrounding hills. Buses can therefore charge their batteries before continuing their journey uphill and partially recharge their batteries through regenerative braking on their way back to Schaffhausen station.
- The Rhine hydro-electric power plant (Rheinkraftwerk), located near the charging stations, provides enough electricity to power the buses throughout the year.

Line 1 (and former lines 2 and 9) was until 2025 part of the Schaffhausen trolleybus system, since the closure of the Schaffhausen tramway network in 1966. With effect from the start of the 2025–2026 timetable, on 14 December 2025, line 1 is also operated by battery-electric buses like the other lines and the last trolleybus service was discontinued. However, two trolleybuses were briefly operated in service on that date, for one last time, as a farewell to the mode.

== History ==
The Verkehrsbetriebe Schaffhausen was created on 1 January 2019, from the merger of two existing companies: the Verkehrsbetriebe Schaffhausen, which served the city of Schaffhausen, and the Regionale Verkehrsbetriebe Schaffhausen, which served the canton. The two companies had coordinated operations for many years prior to the merger.

== See also ==
- Transport in Switzerland
- List of bus operating companies in Switzerland
