= FCS Arena Schaffhausen =

Stadium in Schaffhausen, Switzerland

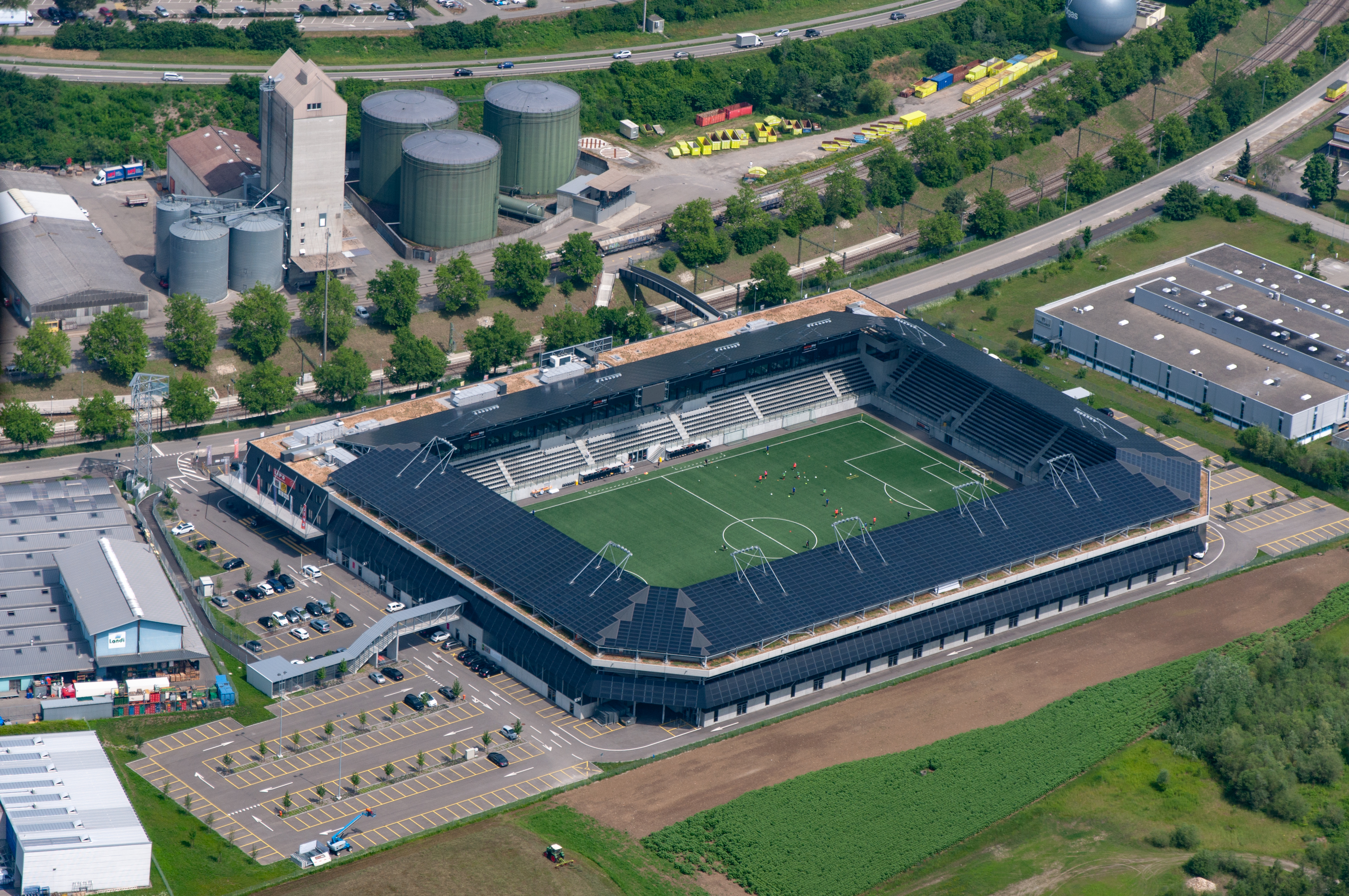
- Interactive map of FCS Arena Schaffhausen
- Location: Herblingertal, Schaffhausen, Switzerland
- Coordinates: 47°43′1.9″N 8°39′59″E
- Owner: Fontana Invest
- Capacity: 8,200
- Surface: Heatable artificial turf

Construction
- Groundbreaking: 28 August 2015
- Built: 2015–2017
- Opened: 28 February 2017
- Cost: CHF 60 million
- Architect: METHABAU Plan AG
- General contractor: METHABAU Bau AG

Tenant
- FC Schaffhausen (2017–present)

FCS Arena Schaffhausen (stylized as BERFORMANCE Arena) is a combined multi-purpose stadium and shopping complex in Schaffhausen, Switzerland. It is the home ground of the football team FC Schaffhausen. Originally named LIPO Park, it was later renamed to wefox Arena, later on Berformance Arena, before its current name.

== Overview ==
The stadium was originally named LIPO Park after its anchor tenant, Swiss furniture retailer LIPO. It replaced at the beginning of 2017 FC Schaffhausen's previous home ground Stadion Breite. The stadium has a seated capacity of 8,200 spectators for football matches capable of accommodating 20,000 people for large events like concerts. The main stand of the stadium is a three-storey building of which two lower storeys consist of sales, office and catering areas. The top floor houses lounges and VIP boxes.

The stadium is equipped with a heatable artificial turf and meets FIFA requirements. The construction of the football stadium was cross-financed by integrated commercial uses (retail and service areas). The stadium is multi-purpose with an area of 8,100 m2. It features the largest in-roof photovoltaic system in Switzerland, and can be used for non-football events. The city of Schaffhausen has approved twelve major events with over 20,000 visitors per year.

FC Schaffhausen played their first Challenge League match at the new stadium on 25 February 2017 against FC Winterthur.

In the summer of 2021, German insurance company wefox acquired the naming rights and the stadium was renamed wefox Arena.

In July 2023, digital service provider Berformance became FC Schaffhausen's main sponsor and acquired the naming rights to the stadium for three years, thus renaming the stadium BERFORMANCE Arena. In January 2024, Berformance were being investigated for fraud by the German authorities and by March the club severed ties, thus renaming their stadium FCS Arena.

== Public transport ==
Herblingen railway station is situated adjacent to the stadium. It is serviced by the S24 service of Zürich S-Bahn and the S62 service of Schaffhausen S-Bahn. The train station is also serviced by bus line 9 of Verkehrsbetriebe Schaffhausen (vbsh).
