= Ruedi Külling =

Swiss graphic designer (1935–2025)

- Born: 4 February 1935; Zurich, Switzerland
- Died: 1 August 2025 (aged 90)
- Occupations: Graphic designer, art director, creative director
- Spouse: Beatrice Stadelmann
- Parent(s): Eugen Külling (father); Emilie Haas (mother)

Ruedi Külling (4 February 1935 – 1 August 2025) was a Swiss graphic designer and art director known for his work in advertising and communication design. He was a Protestant from Wilchingen.

== Early life and education ==
Ruedi Külling was born on 4 February 1935 in Zurich to Eugen Külling, a cabinetmaker, and Emilie Haas. From 1951 to 1956, he studied graphic design at the School of Decorative Arts in Zurich (Kunstgewerbeschule Zürich).

== Career ==
Between 1956 and 1962, Külling worked as a designer and art director in Milan, London, and Chicago. In 1963, he returned to Switzerland and joined the advertising agency Advico in Gockhausen as creative director. He became a member of the management in 1965 and a partner in 1976.

In 1989, Külling founded Külling Partner Identity, a communication design firm. In 1996, he co-founded Xemex Swiss Watch with Hanspeter Hanschick, a company focused on developing design watches. Throughout his career, he was a member of various professional associations.

== Recognition and legacy ==
Külling received numerous national and international awards throughout his career. He was honored 17 times by the Federal Department of Home Affairs for creating one of the 20 best posters of the year in Switzerland. He also received gold and bronze medals at the International Poster Biennial in Warsaw and won the Premio Europeo Rizzoli Pubblicità.

Some of his works are held in the collections of the Museum of Modern Art in New York City.

== Personal life ==
Külling married Beatrice Stadelmann. He died on 1 August 2025.

== Bibliography ==
- Schindler, H. Monografie des Plakats, 1972
- Müller-Brockmann, J., Wobmann, K., ed. Fotoplakate, 1989
- Hollis, R. Swiss Graphic Design, 2006
