= Bad Osterfingen =

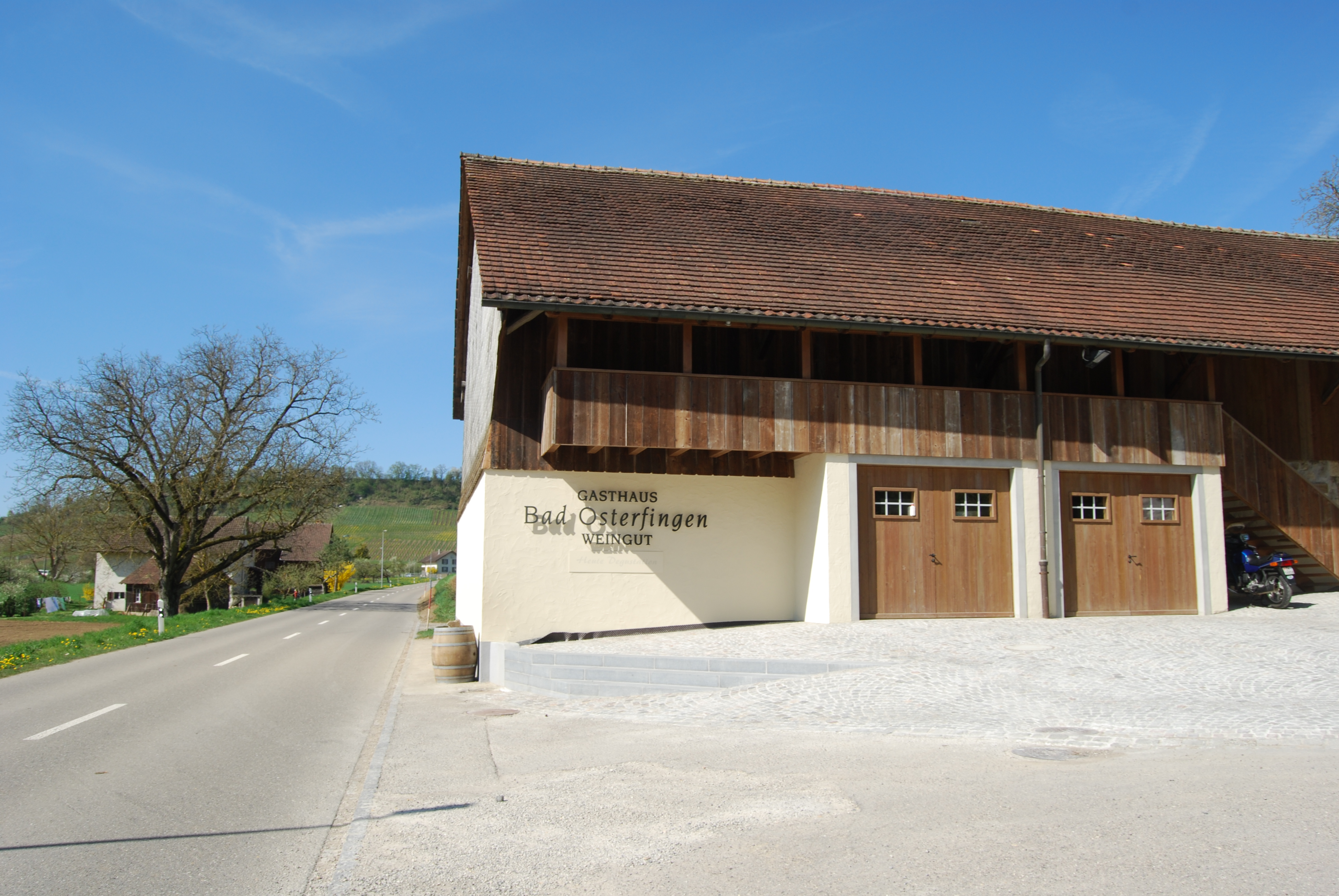
- Native name: Gasthaus & Weingut Bad Osterfingen
- Industry: Restaurant
- Founded: 1472
- Headquarters: Zollstrasse 17 8218, Osterfingen, Switzerland
- Website: www.badosterfingen.ch

Bad Osterfingen is a traditional inn and winery in Osterfingen, Switzerland founded in 1472.

Today domestic wines from the own vineyard are served for visitors in the candlelit ballroom, cosy parlour or in the guest lounge.

== See also ==
- List of oldest companies
