= Herblingen railway station =

Railway station in Switzerland

Herblingen
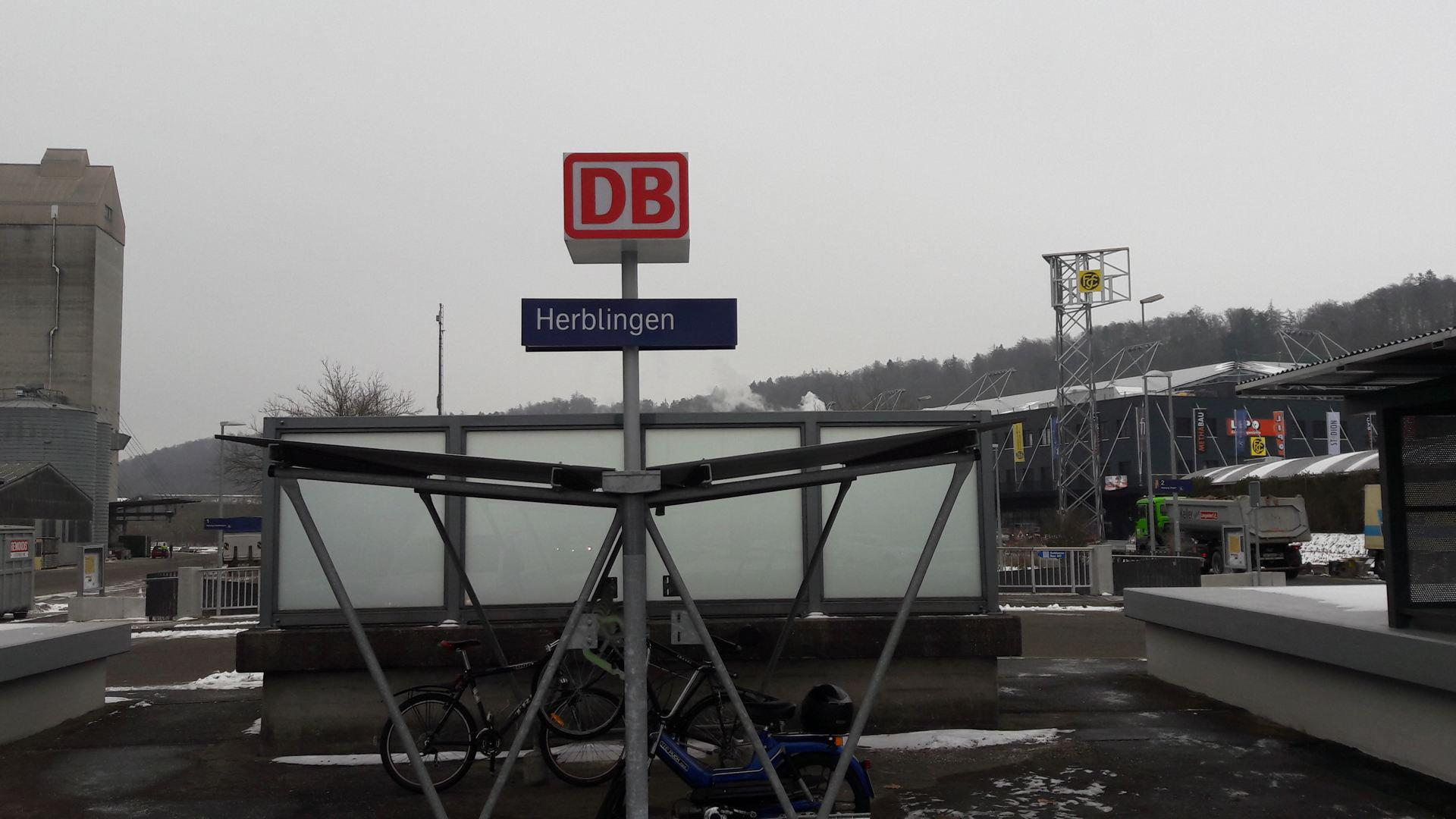
- The station entrance in 2017

General information
- Location: Schaffhausen; Switzerland
- Coordinates: 47°43′02″N 8°39′51″E
- Elevation: 455 m (1,493 ft)
- Owner: Bundeseisenbahnvermögen (since 1994)
- Lines: High Rhine Railway (KBS 730)
- Distance: 367.9 km (228.6 mi) from Mannheim Hauptbahnhof
- Platforms: 2 side platforms
- Tracks: 2
- Train operators: SBB GmbH; Swiss Federal Railways
- Connections
- Bus: vbsh 9
- Airport: Direct line to/from Zürich Flughafen with S24 in 0:54h

Other information
- Fare zone: 810 (Tarifverbund Ostwind)

History
- Opened: 1968

Services
Preceding station	Schaffhausen S-Bahn	Following station
Schaffhausen Terminus	S62	Thayngen towards Singen (Hohentwiel)
Preceding station	Zurich S-Bahn	Following station
Schaffhausen towards Zug	S24	Thayngen Terminus
Location
- Location within Switzerland Location within Canton of Schaffhausen

Herblingen railway station is a railway station in the Swiss canton of Schaffhausen and in the former village of Herblingen, which is today part of the city of Schaffhausen. Although the station is in Switzerland, it is located on the Deutsche Bahn's High Rhine railway line that links Basel to Singen.

The first Herblingen railway station, which was located further north (near Neutal), opened in 1863. With the construction of the Herblingen Tunnel in 1968, the station was moved to its current location and the old station was dismantled. The station infrastructure has been improved for the opening of FCS Arena Schaffhausen right next to it in 2017.

== Services ==
As of the December 2022 timetable change, the following S-Bahn services stop at Herblingen:

- Schaffhausen S-Bahn S62: half-hourly service between Schaffhausen and Singen (Hohentwiel), some trains continue to Radolfzell.
- Zurich S-Bahn S24: hourly service between Thayngen and Zug.

== Bus ==
Line 9 of Verkehrsbetriebe Schaffhausen (vbsh) serves Herblingen railway station.

== See also ==
- Bodensee S-Bahn
- Rail transport in Switzerland
