= Canton of Schaffhausen =

Canton of Switzerland

Canton of Schaffhausen Kanton Schaffhausen (German) Canton of Schaffhouse
- Canton
- Flag Coat of arms Logo
- Interactive map of Canton of Schaffhausen
- Coordinates: 47°43′N 8°34′E
- Capital: Schaffhausen
- Subdivisions: 26 municipalities

Government
  - President: Martin Kessler
  - Executive: Regierungsrat (5)
  - Legislative: Kantonsrat (60)

Area
  - Total: 298.43 km^{2} (115.22 sq mi)

Population (December 2020)
  - Total: 83,107
  - Density: 278.48/km^{2} (721.26/sq mi)

GDP
  - Total: CHF 7.244 billion (2020)
  - Per capita: CHF 87,569 (2020)
- ISO 3166 code: CH-SH
- Highest point: 912 m (2,992 ft): Hoher Randen
- Lowest point: 344 m (1,129 ft): Rhine at Buchberg
- Joined: 1501
- Languages: German
- Website: www.sh.ch

The canton of Schaffhausen, also canton of Schaffhouse (German: Kanton Schaffhausen; Romansh: Chantun Schaffusa; French: Canton de Schaffhouse; Italian: Canton Sciaffusa), is the northernmost canton of Switzerland. The principal city and capital of the canton is Schaffhausen. The canton's territory is divided into three non-contiguous segments, where German territory reaches the Rhine. The large central part, which includes the capital, in turn separates the German exclave of Büsingen am Hochrhein from the rest of Germany.

== History ==
Two Paleolithic sites testify the presence of humans in the canton of Schaffhausen between 15,000 and 11,000 BC. The first one, Schweizersbild in the municipality of Schaffhausen, is a rock shelter and the site of a habitation, where several prehistoric artifacts were found. The second one, Kesslerloch, is a cave in the municipality of Thayngen, where artifacts and animal bones were unearthed. Several finds are on display at the Museum zu Allerheiligen in Schaffhausen.

During the Roman era, there used to be a city near present-day Schleitheim, whose name, Iuliomagus, is indicated in the Tabula Peutingeriana. The remains of a bath were discovered there based on the map, and are shown in a local museum.

Schaffhausen was a city-state in the Middle Ages; it is documented that it struck its own coins starting in 1045. It was then documented as Villa Scafhusun. Around 1049, Count Eberhard von Nellenburg founded a Benedictine monastery which led to the development of a community. This community achieved independence in 1190. In 1330, the town lost not only all its lands but also its independence to the Habsburgs. In 1415, the Habsburg Duke Frederick IV of Austria sided with the Antipope John XXIII at the Council of Constance, and was banned by the Emperor Sigismund.

As a result of the ban and Frederick's need of money, Schaffhausen was able to buy its independence from the Habsburgs in 1418. The city allied with six of the Swiss confederates in 1454 and allied with a further two (Uri and Unterwalden) in 1479. Schaffhausen became a full member of the Old Swiss Confederation in 1501.

The first railroad came to Schaffhausen in 1857. In 1944, Schaffhausen suffered from a bombing raid by United States Army Air Forces planes that accidentally strayed from Germany into neutral Switzerland.

The cantonal constitution was written in 1876 and revised in 1895. The distinctive coat of arms bears the Schaffhauser Bock (Billy Goat of Schaffhausen).

== Geography ==
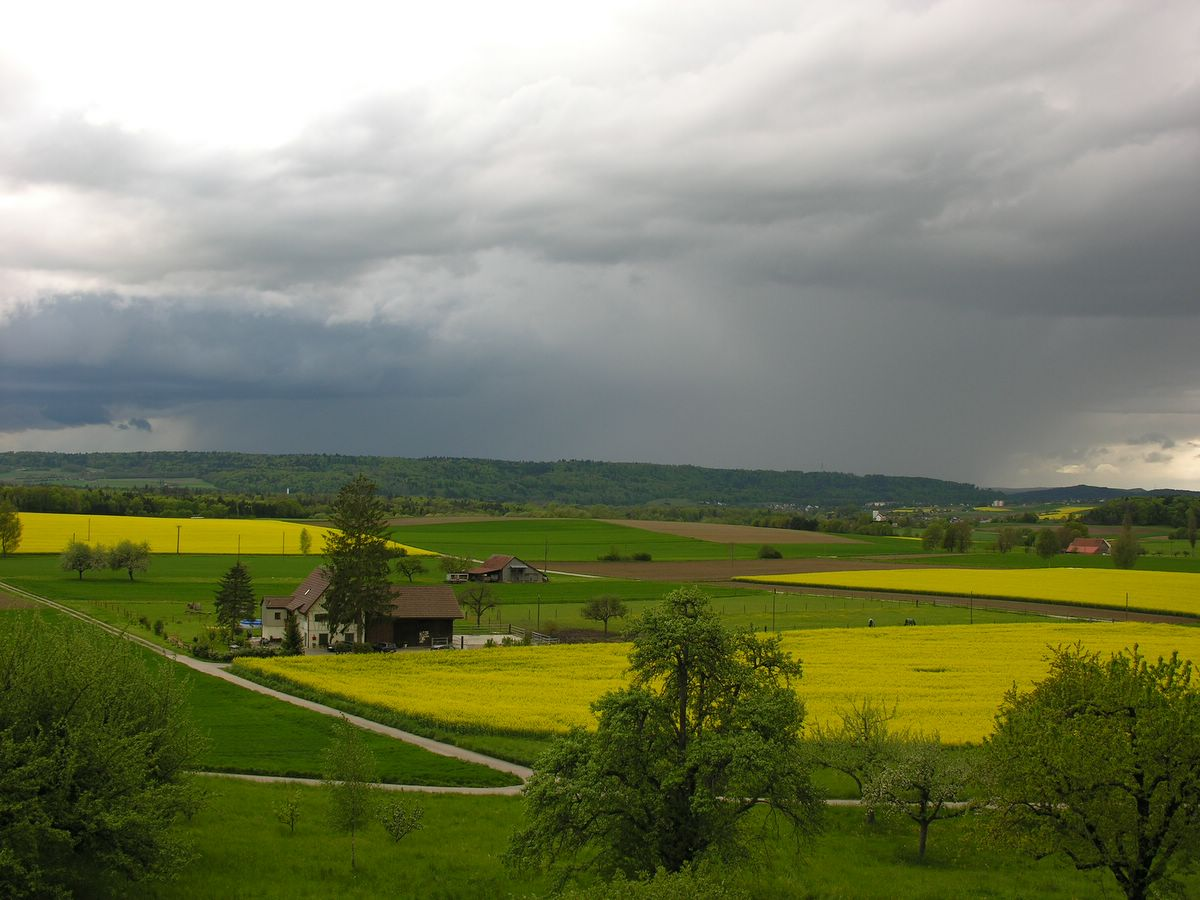
Countryside near Dörflingen

Schaffhausen is the northernmost canton of Switzerland and lies almost entirely on the right bank of the High Rhine, with only part of Stein am Rhein (Vor der Brugg) on the left bank. The northernmost village is Bargen. It lies west of Lake Constance and has a total area of 298 km^{2} (115 sq mi). Much of the canton is productive agricultural land, with 134.4 km^{2} (51.9 sq mi) (about 45%) of the canton used for agriculture while an additional 128.7 km^{2} (49.7 sq mi) (about 43%) is wooded. Most of the rest of the canton, 31.8 km^{2} (12.3 sq mi) (about 10%), is developed, while only 3.8 km^{2} (1.5 sq mi) (1.3%) of the canton is unproductive (rivers, lakes or mountains).

The canton's territory is divided into three non-contiguous segments where German territory reaches the High Rhine. The large central part, which includes the capital Schaffhausen, in turn partially (along with territory of two neighbouring cantons) separates the German exclave of Büsingen am Hochrhein from the rest of Germany. The small exclave of Rüdlingen-Buchberg lies to the southwest, and the third part contains Ramsen and Stein am Rhein to the east. With the exception of Vor der Brugg, part of Stein am Rhein, all three segments are separated from the rest of Switzerland by the Rhine. The two smaller islands of the Werd islands near Stein am Rhein are in the canton of Schaffhausen.

The canton of Schaffhausen is bordered by the Swiss cantons of Zurich and Thurgau, as well as the German districts of Waldshut, Schwarzwald-Baar-Kreis and Konstanz in Baden-Württemberg. Schaffhausen shares a longer border with Germany than with the neighbouring Swiss cantons.

Most of the canton lies on a plateau dominated by the Randen. This range includes the Lange Rande and the Hage, the canton's highest point at 912 m (2,992 ft). The slopes of the mountain range are gentle towards the south where it reaches the Rhine valley. Short and narrow valleys intersect these gentle slopes. The Klettgau is one such valley. The northeastern region of the canton's central part is also known as the Reiat.

The Rhine Falls are the largest waterfalls in Europe and lie on the border of the cantons of Schaffhausen and Zurich. Besides the Rhine, other rivers in the canton include the Biber, Durach and Klingengraben. The Wutach forms a small section of the cantonal border.

== Municipalities ==
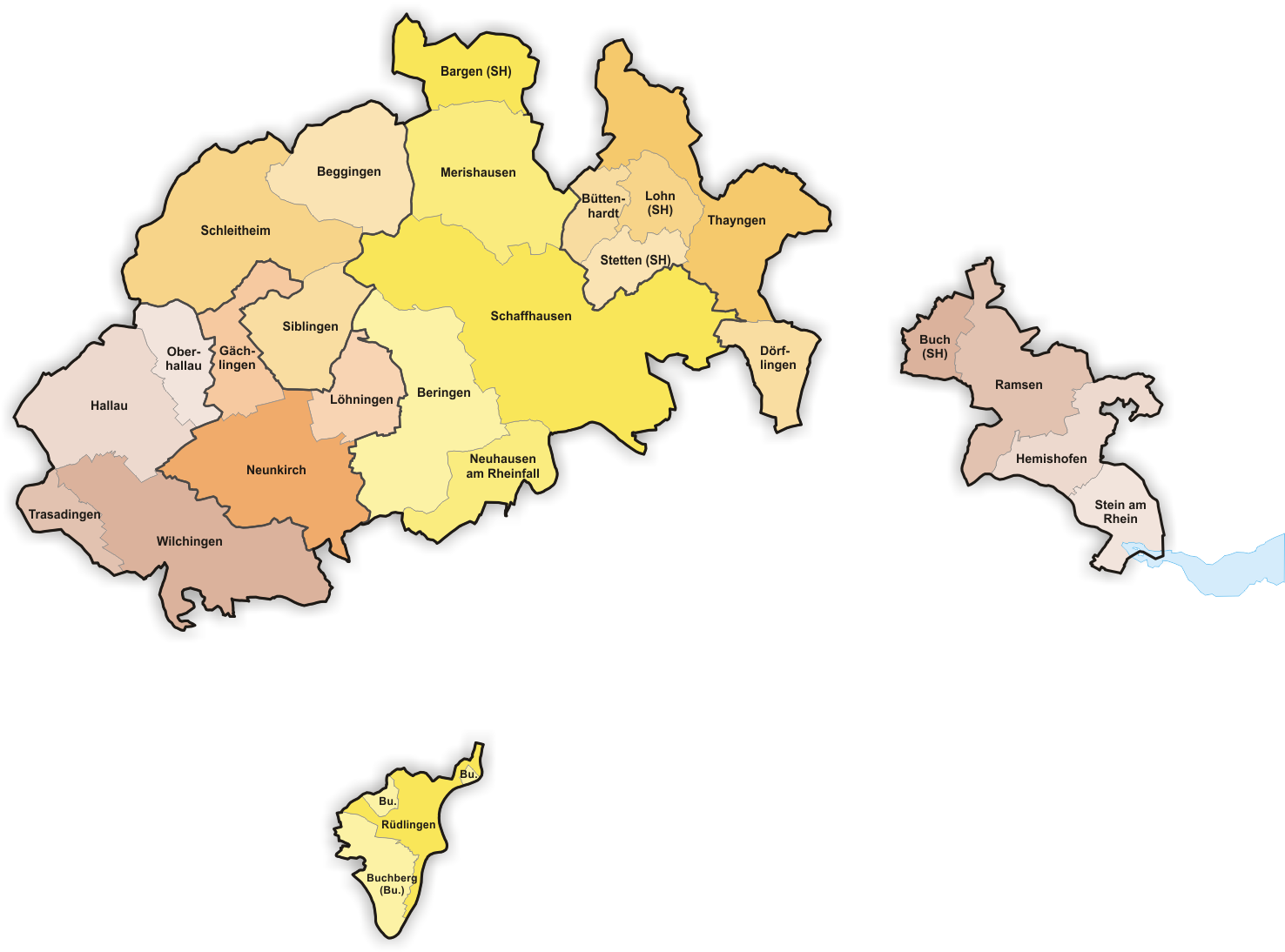
Municipalities in the Canton

There are 26 municipalities in the canton as of March 2017.

- Bargen
- Beggingen
- Beringen
- Buch
- Buchberg
- Büttenhardt
- Dörflingen
- Gächlingen
- Hallau
- Hemishofen
- Lohn
- Löhningen
- Merishausen
- Neuhausen am Rheinfall
- Neunkirch
- Oberhallau
- Ramsen
- Rüdlingen
- Schaffhausen
- Schleitheim
- Siblingen
- Stein am Rhein
- Stetten
- Thayngen
- Trasadingen
- Wilchingen

=== Merger ===
- In 1947, the municipality Buchthalen merged into Schaffhausen.
- In 1964, the municipality Herblingen merged into Schaffhausen.
- In 2004, the municipality Barzheim merged into Thayngen.
- In 2005, the municipality Osterfingen merged into Wilchingen.
- On 1 January 2009, the municipalities Altdorf, Bibern, Hofen, and Opfertshofen merged into Thayngen.
- In 2009, the municipality Hemmental merged into Schaffhausen.
- In 2013, the municipality Guntmadingen merged into Beringen.

== Demographics ==
The population of the canton (as of 31 December 2020) is 83,107. As of 2007, the population included 16,323 foreigners, or about 21.9% of the total population. The German language and Protestant faith predominate. The majority of the population (as of 2000) is Protestant (50%) while a large minority is Roman Catholic (24%).

Year	1850	1880	1900	1950	1970	2000
Population	35 300	38 241	41 514	57 515	72 854	73 392
Language
German		38 117	40 290	55 257	61 518	64 323
Italian		39	886	1 490	6 682	1 897
French		149	264	529	553	370
Romansch		4	16	101	139	80
Other		39	58	138	3 962	6 722
Religion
Protestant	33 880	33 897	34 046	44 408	46 772	37 025
Catholic	1 411	4 154	7 403	12 431	23 277	17 790
Chr. Catholic				275	192	83
Other	9	297	65	401	2 613	18 494
Nationality
Swiss	33 938	33 963	33 860	53 950	58 907	58 290
Other	1 362	4 278	7 654	3 565	13 947	15 102

== Politics ==
=== Cantonal government ===
The legislature is the Cantonal Council (Kantonsrat) of Schaffhausen, which consists of 60 members elected proportionally every four years. Until 2008, it consisted of 80 members.

The executive branch is the Government Council (Regierungsrat), which consists of 5 members elected every four years.

=== Federal election results ===
Percentage of the total vote per party in the canton in the Federal Elections 1971–2023
Party	Ideology	1971	1975	1979	1983	1987	1991	1995	1999	2003	2007	2011	2015	2019	2023
FDP.The Liberals^{a}	Classical liberalism	33.1	40.1	32.3	26.2	34.3	28.6	31.9	40.1	29.1	26.7	12.3	12.9	11.0	12.2
The Centre (former CVP/PDC/PPD/PCD)	Christian democracy	8.0	* ^{b}	*	6.3	*	*	*	*	2.7	*	5.2	*	2.1	2.6
SP/PS	Social democracy	40.2	37.2	35.3	35.4	39.2	34.2	37.8	33.6	39.7	34.2	34.6	28.8	26.2	27.4
SVP/UDC	Swiss nationalism	*	*	21.1	22.6	23.5	19.2	20.4	26.0	28.5	39.1	39.9	45.3	39.5	39.1
Ring of Independents	Social liberalism	12.2	16.6	*	5.6	*	*	*	*	*	*	*	*	*	*
EVP/PEV	Christian democracy	*	*	6.3	*	*	*	*	*	*	*	*	*	1.9	2.5
POCH	Progressivism	*	6.1	4.1	2.7	*	*	*	*	*	*	*	*	*	*
GPS/PES	Green politics	*	*	*	*	*	*	*	*	*	*	*	3.4	6.8	4.8
GPL/PVL	Green liberalism	*	*	*	*	*	*	*	*	*	*	*	*	5.9	6.8
FGA	Feminist	*	*	*	*	*	3.9	*	*	*	*	*	*	*	*
SD/DS	National conservatism	6.4	*	*	*	*	*	*	*	*	*	*	*	*	*
EDU/UDF	Christian right	*	*	*	*	3.0	2.7	*	*	*	*	3.8	5.1		
FPS/PSL	Right-wing populism	*	*	*	*	*	11.4	8.6	*	*	*	*	*		
Other		*	*	0.9	1.2	*	*	1.4	*	*	*	4.3	4.4		
Voter participation %		78.7	74.1	75.1	73.7	69.6	69.0	64.4	61.9	63.2	65.3	60.8	62.6	59.6	61.6

^a FDP before 2009, FDP.The Liberals after 2009
^b "*" indicates that the party was not on the ballot in this canton.

National Councillors (Nationalrat/ -rätin) of Schaffhausen 2023–2027
Councillor	Party	part of the National Council since	no. of votes
Linda De Ventura	SP	2024	
Thomas Hurter	SP	2007	

=== Compulsory voting ===
Swiss citizens who live in the canton of Schaffhausen are required to vote in elections. Compulsory voting never existed on the national level in Switzerland. It was introduced in several cantons starting in the late 19th century. In 1974, it was abolished everywhere except in Schaffhausen. Citizens who do not vote have to pay a small fine.

== Economy ==
Schaffhausen is a part of the Zurich metropolitan area (Greater Zurich area) and the canton's economy is well integrated with that of the wider region.

Well-regarded white Riesling wine is grown here as well as several other varieties. The main industries, however, are the production of machinery and metal goods. There is also watch making and jewellery. Minor industrial branches are textiles, leather goods, glass, cement, paper and chemicals. There is also the Falken AG brewery, founded in 1799.

At Rheinau there is a hydro electrical power plant generating electricity for the canton and for export. Major electricity customers are the chemical industry in Rheinfelden and the aluminium plant at Neuhausen am Rheinfall. The city of Schaffhausen also uses much of the electricity produced at Rheinau.

Schaffhausen lies on the busy Milan-Zürich-Stuttgart rail line which is serviced by trains from both the Swiss Federal Railways and German Railways.

The largest companies are ABB Schweiz AG (which acquired the local electrical engineering firm Carl Maier & Cie in 1992), Johnson Controls, TE Connectivity, SIG, Georg Fischer AG, IWC Schaffhausen, Unilever, Syntegon and Cilag AG (Johnson & Johnson).

== Transportation ==
Rail and bus services operate within the Ostwind Tariff Network.

=== Bus ===
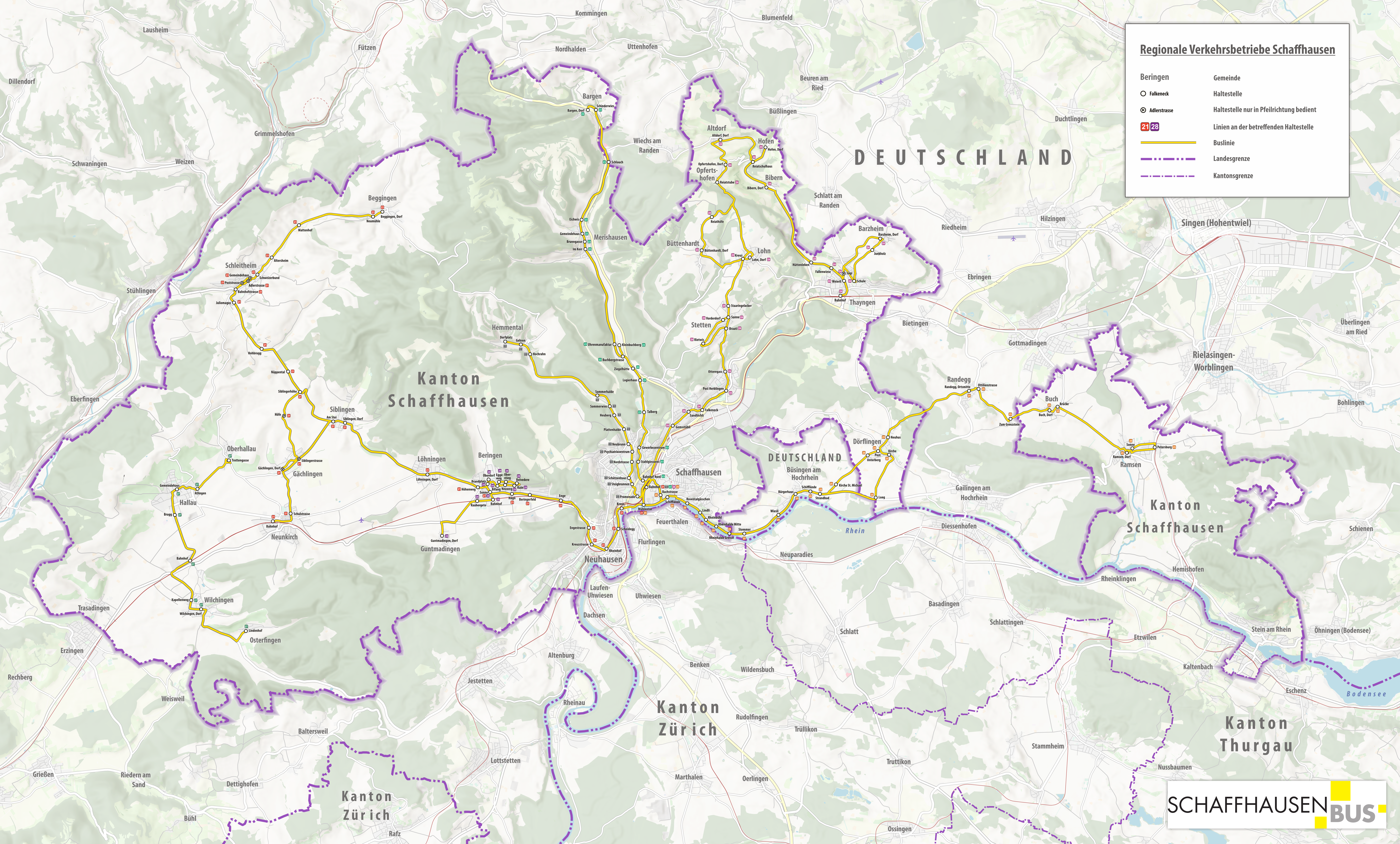
Regional bus routes of vbsh in the canton of Schaffhausen and neighboring German territory (as of December 2023)

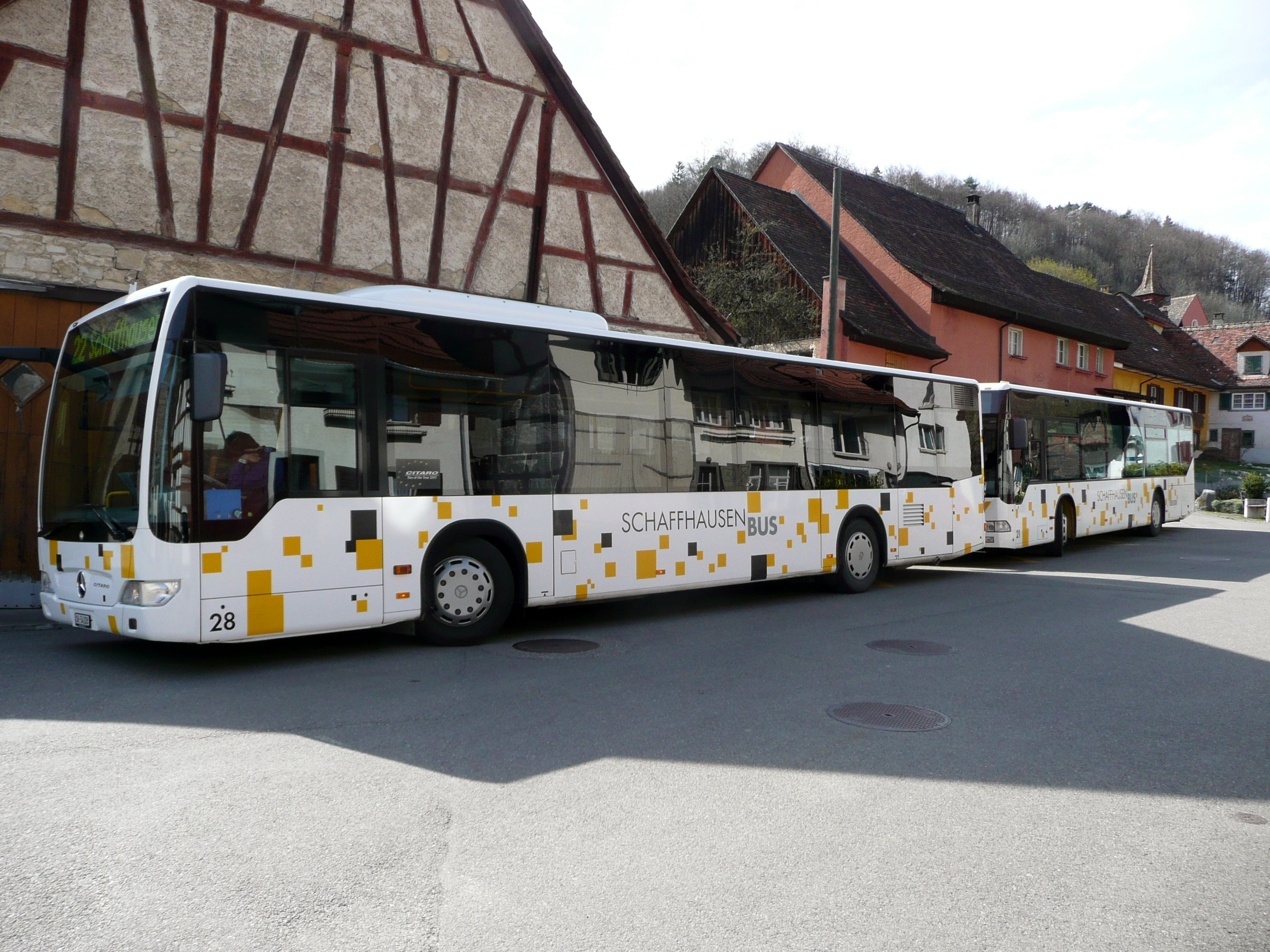
Regional buses in Hemmental

The neighboring towns of Schaffhausen and Neuhausen am Rheinfall share a municipal bus network with frequent services (see: urban buses in Schaffhausen and Neuhausen).

There are several regional bus services that link towns and villages in the canton of Schaffhausen with each other or with towns in the adjacent canton of Zürich and nearby German territory, respectively. Bus services 21, 22, 23, 24, 25 and lines 630 and 634 (the latter two to villages in the northern part of canton of Zürich) all depart from the forecourt of Schaffhausen railway station in Schaffhausen. In addition, bus line 33 ( 7349 ) connects villages in the eastern part of the canton of Schaffhausen with Singen (Hohentwiel) (some courses continue to Konstanz) in Germany. Line 675 connects the villages of Rüdlingen and Buchberg in the southern part of the canton of Schaffhausen with Rafz and Henggart (both are in the canton of Zürich), respectively. Route 825 links Stein am Rhein in the eastern part of the canton of Schaffhausen with Frauenfeld, the capital of the canton of Thurgau. Lines 21, 22, 23, 24, 25, 27 and 28 are operated by Verkehrsbetriebe Schaffhausen (vbsh), while routes 630 , 634 , 675 , and 825 are operated by Postauto, and line 33 ( 7349 ) is run by Südbadenbus.

The regional bus lines are as follows (railway stations in bold letters):

Line	Route	Operator
21	Schaffhausen railway station – Neuhausen – Beringen – Löhningen – Siblingen – Schleitheim – Beggingen	vbsh
22	Schaffhausen railway station – Hemmental	vbsh
23	Schaffhausen railway station – Merishausen – Bargen	vbsh
24	Schaffhausen railway station – Stetten – Lohn – Büttenhardt – Opfertshofen – Altdorf – Hofen – Bibern – Thayngen railway station (– Barzheim)	vbsh
25	Schaffhausen railway station – Büsingen – Dörflingen – Randegg – Murbach – Buch – Ramsen	vbsh
27	Oberhallau – Hallau – Wilchingen-Hallau railway station – Wilchingen – Osterfingen	vbsh
28	Guntmadingen – Beringen Badischer Bahnhof – Beringen, Belvedere	vbsh
33	Stein am Rhein railway station – Hemishofen – Ramsen (– Rielasingen – Singen (Hohentwiel) railway station – Konstanz station)	Südbadenbus
630	Schaffhausen railway station – Feuerthalen – Flurlingen – Uhwiesen – Benken – Marthalen	Postauto
634	Schaffhausen railway station – Feuerthalen – Flurlingen – Uhwiesen – Dachsen – Schloss Laufen am Rheinfall	Postauto
675	Rafz railway station – Rüdlingen – Buchberg – Flaach – Volken – Dorf – Humlikon – Henggart railway station	Postauto
825	Stein am Rhein railway station – Eschenz – Herdern TG – Warth-Weiningen – Frauenfeld railway station	Postauto

==== Nighttime Bus ====
On weekends, there are night bus services operating on regional bus routes after midnight.

Line	Route	Operator
N76	Schaffhausen railway station – Schaffhausen, Falkeneck – Schaffhausen, Schlossweiher – Thayngen, Hüttenleben – Thayngen railway station – Schaffhausen, Falkeneck – Schaffhausen railway station	vbsh
N77	Schaffhausen railway station – Neuhausen am Rheinfall – Beringen – Guntmadingen – Neunkirch – Oberhallau – Hallau – Wilchingen – Osterfingen – Trasadingen	vbsh

=== Rail ===
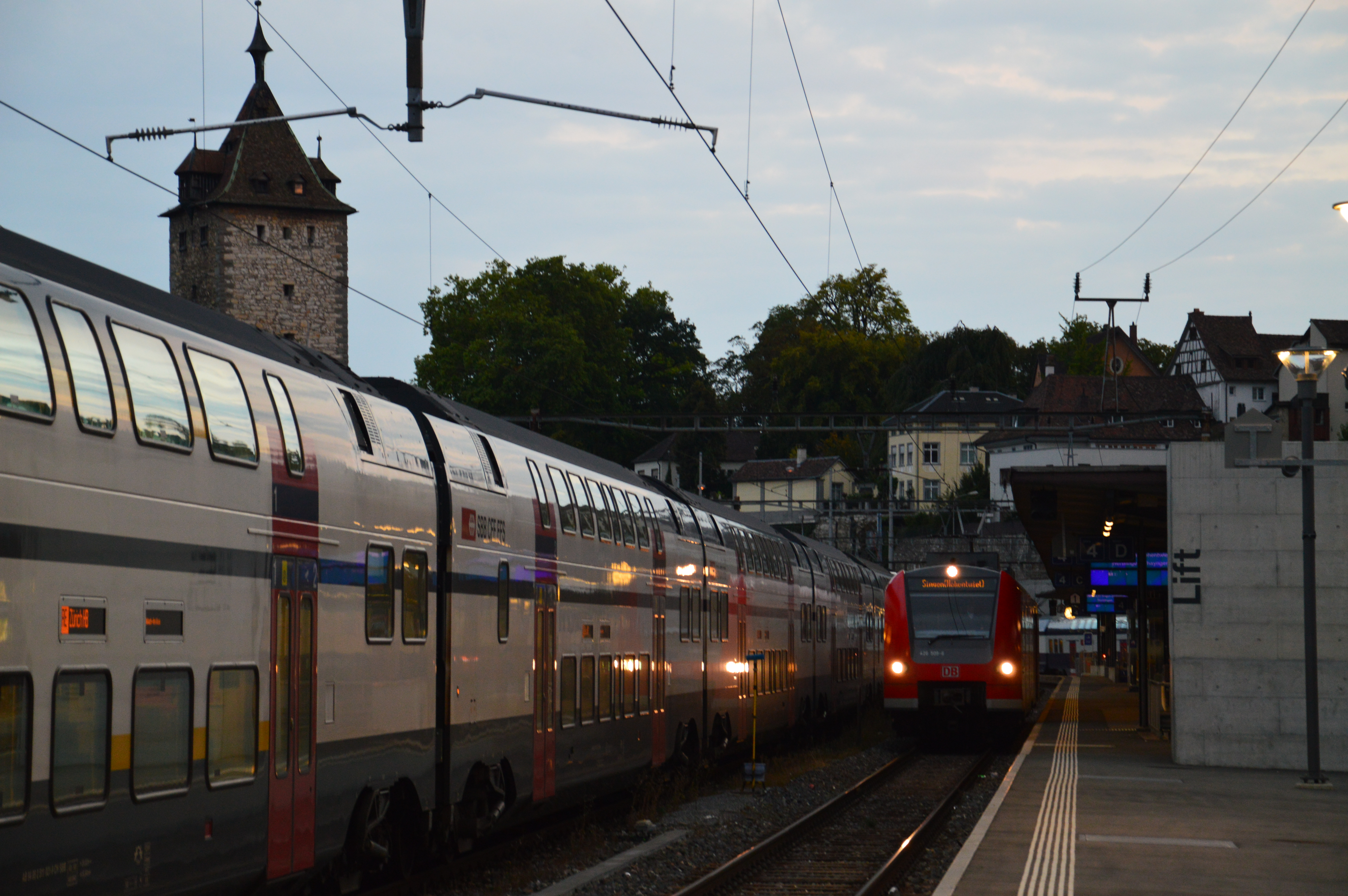
Trains at Schaffhausen railway station

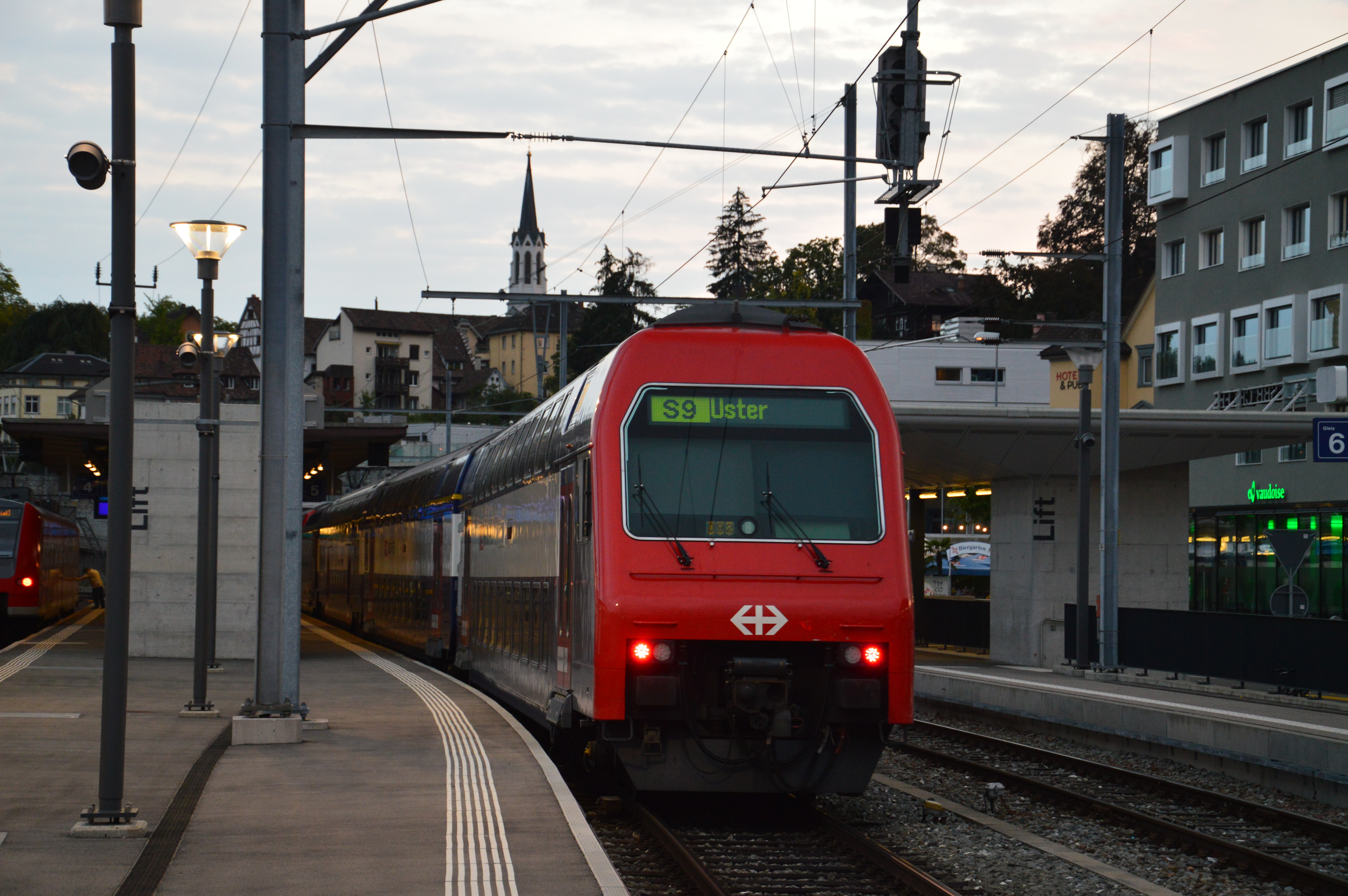
S9 service of Zürich S-Bahn at Schaffhausen railway station

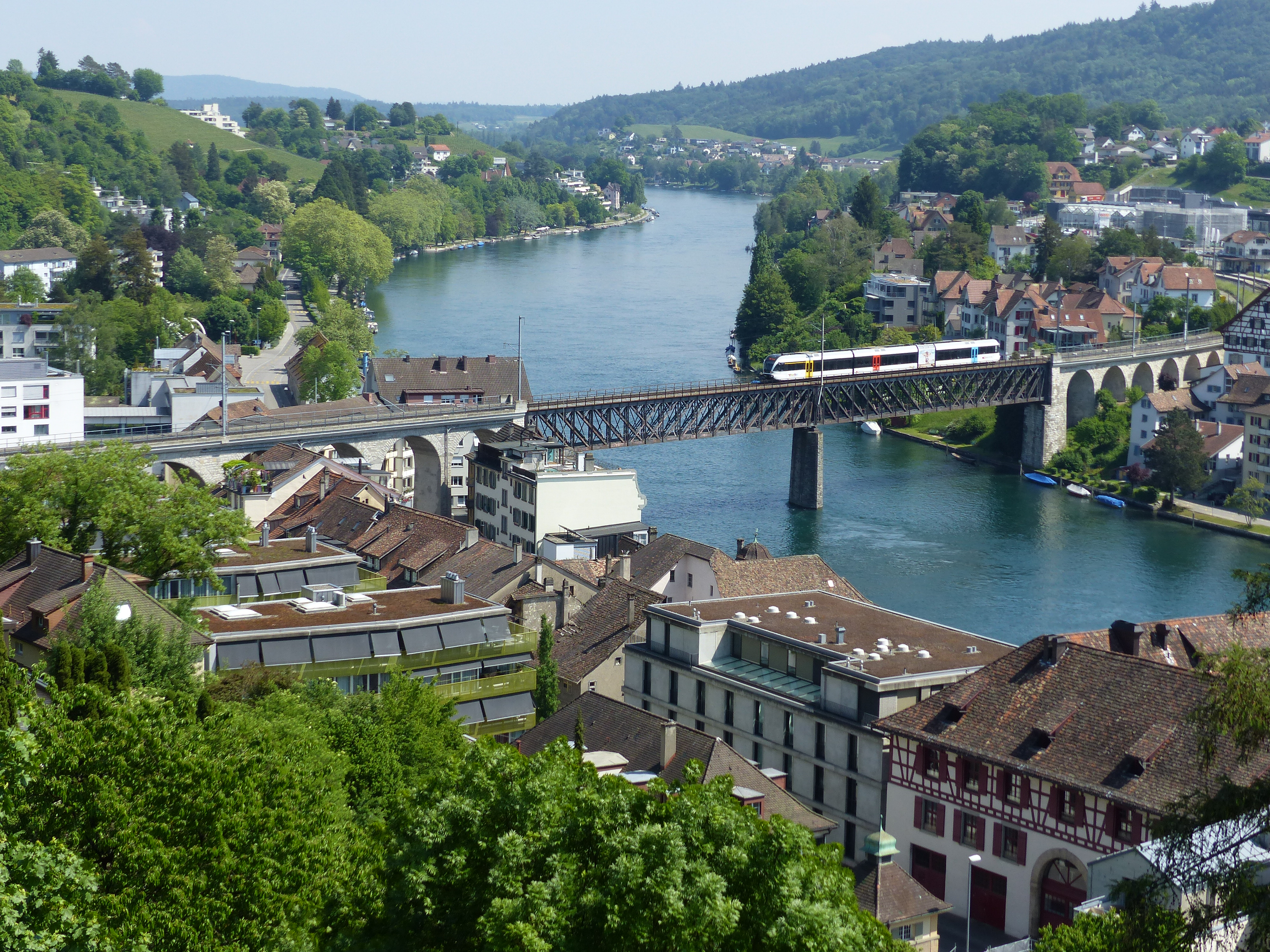
Thurbo on the Rheinbrücke (Lake Line) between Schaffhausen and Feuerthalen

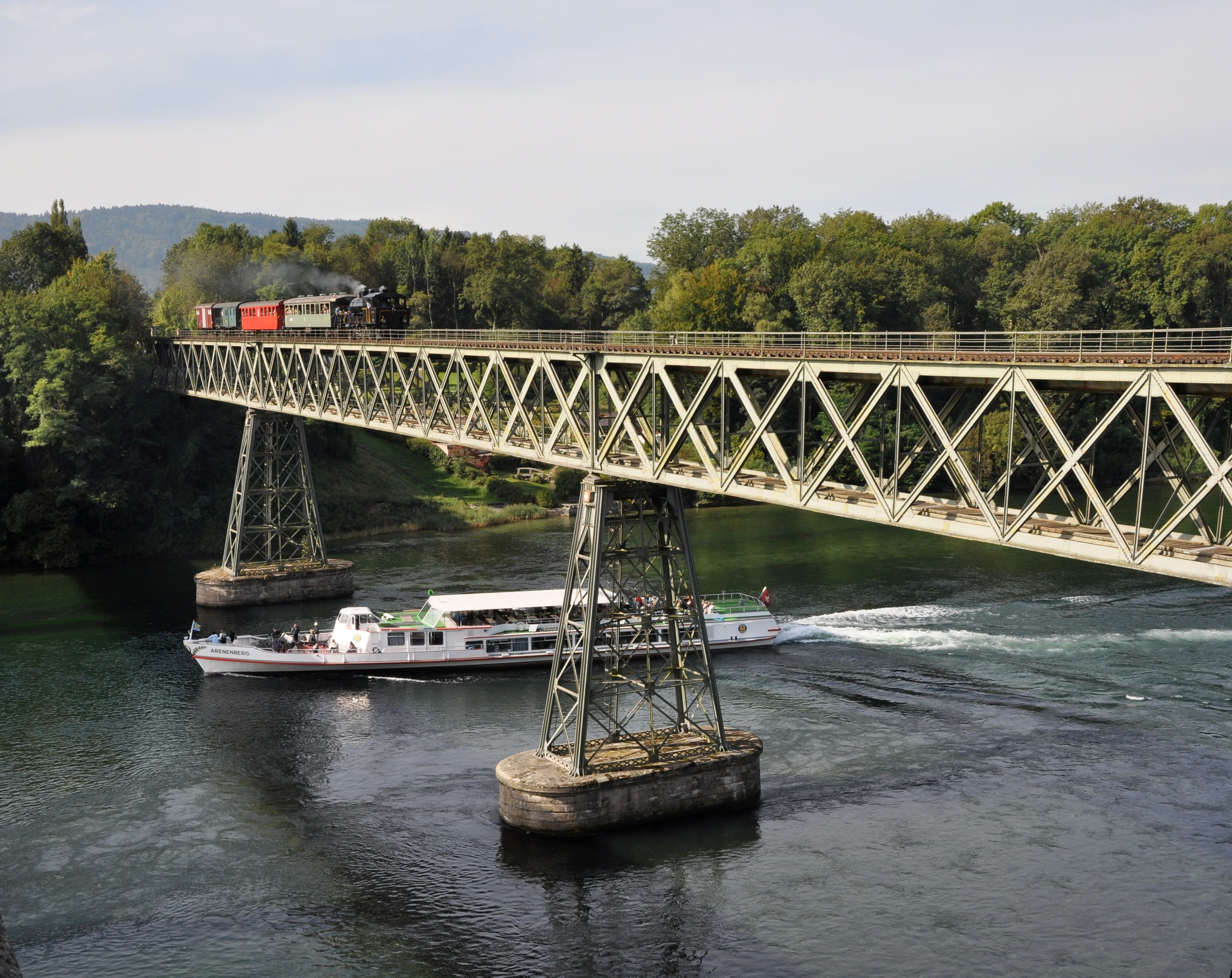
The Hemishofen railway bridge (near Stein am Rhein) over the River Rhine on the Etzwilen–Singen railway line (via Hemishofen and Ramsen) is nowadays only used by a museum railway line (a boat of URh is seen below)

Several train stations in the canton of Schaffhausen provide S-Bahn-style services (lines designated with an "S" followed by the route number). Some lines also operate for Bodensee S-Bahn. Schaffhausen railway station is also served by InterCity (IC) and RegioExpress (RE) trains of Swiss Federal Railways (SBB CFF FFS) and Deutsche Bahn (DB), and Regional-Express (RE) and IC trains of DB. Two railway stations in the eastern part of the canton, Hemishofen and Ramsen on the Etzwilen–Singen railway, are closed to regular passenger service,

Train services are as follows (as of December 2024):

Schaffhausen station

- DB Fernverkehr IC 87 / SBB CFF FFS: Zürich HB – Schaffhausen – Stuttgart Hbf (hourly service)
- RE48 (SBB CFF FFS): Schaffhausen – Bülach – Zürich Oerlikon – Zürich HB (hourly service)
- RE 3 (DB Regio Baden-Württemberg): Basel Bad Bf – Schaffhausen – Friedrichshafen-Hafen (hourly service)
- S1 (St. Gallen S-Bahn): Schaffhausen – Stein am Rhein – Kreuzlingen – Romanshorn – St. Gallen – Wil SG (half-hourly service)
- S9 (Zurich S-Bahn): Schaffhausen – Bülach – Zürich HB – Uster (hourly/half-hourly service)
- S12 (Zurich S-Bahn): Schaffhausen – Winterthur – Zürich HB – Brugg AG (hourly service)
- S24 (Zurich S-Bahn): Thayngen – Schaffhausen – Winterthur – Zurich Airport – Zürich HB – Zug (hourly service)
- S33 (Zurich S-Bahn): Schaffhausen – Winterthur (hourly service)
- S62 (Schaffhausen S-Bahn): Schaffhausen – Singen (Hohentwiel) (half-hourly service)
- S64 (Schaffhausen S-Bahn): Schaffhausen – Erzingen (Baden) (half-hourly service)
- S65 (Schaffhausen S-Bahn): Schaffhausen – Jestetten (hourly service)

Herblingen and Thayngen stations

- S24 (Zurich S-Bahn): Thayngen – Herblingen – Schaffhausen – Winterthur – Zurich Airport – Zürich HB – Zug (hourly service)
- S62 (Schaffhausen S-Bahn): Singen (Hohentwiel) – Thayngen – Herblingen – Schaffhausen – (half-hourly service)

Neuhausen station

- S9 (Zurich S-Bahn): Schaffhausen – Neuhausen – Bülach – Zürich HB – Uster (hourly/half-hourly service)
- S12 (Zurich S-Bahn): Schaffhausen – Neuhausen – Winterthur – Zürich HB – Brugg AG (hourly service)
- S24 (Zurich S-Bahn): Thayngen – Schaffhausen – Neuhausen – Winterthur – Zürich Airport – Zürich HB – Zug (hourly service)
- S33 (Zurich S-Bahn): Schaffhausen – Neuhausen – Winterthur (hourly service)
- S65 (Schaffhausen S-Bahn): Schaffhausen – Neuhausen – Jestetten (hourly service)

Neuhausen Rheinfall station

- S9 (Zurich S-Bahn): Schaffhausen – Neuhausen Rheinfall – Bülach – Zürich HB – Uster (hourly/half-hourly service)
- S65 (Schaffhausen S-Bahn): Schaffhausen – Neuhausen Rheinfall – Jestetten (half-hourly service)

Neuhausen Badischer Bahnhof, Beringerfeld, Beringen, Neunkirch, Wilchingen-Hallau and Trasadingen stations

- S64 (Schaffhausen S-Bahn): Schaffhausen – Neuhausen Badischer Bahnhof – Beringerfeld – Beringen Badischer Bahnhof – Neunkirch – Wilchingen-Hallau – Trasadingen – Erzingen (Baden) (half-hourly service)

Stein am Rhein station

- S1 (St. Gallen S-Bahn): Schaffhausen – Stein am Rhein – Kreuzlingen – Romanshorn – St. Gallen – Wil SG (half-hourly service)
- S29 (Zurich S-Bahn): Stein am Rhein – Winterthur (half-hourly service)

=== Boat ===
During warmer seasons (April to October), there are regular boat trips by the Schweizerische Schifffahrtsgesellschaft Untersee und Rhein (URh) on the River Rhine (High Rhine) between Schifflände in Schaffhausen and Kreuzlingen (Lake Constance) via Stein am Rhein.

=== Air ===
The nearest airports to the canton are Zurich Airport and EuroAirport Basel Mulhouse Freiburg.
