= Neunkirch railway station =

German owned railway station in Switzerland

Neunkirch
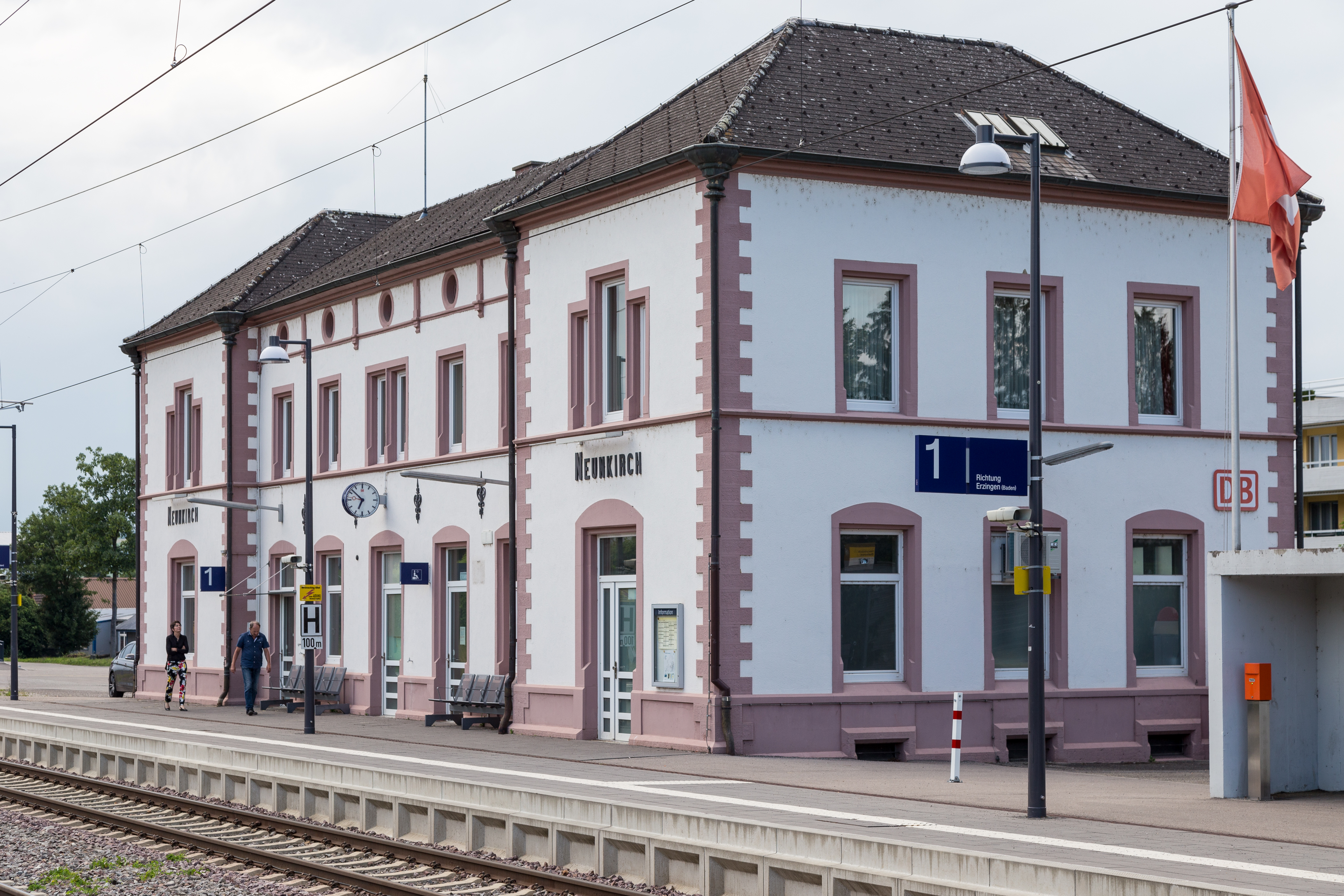
- The station in 2018

General information
- Location: Neunkirch, Schaffhausen; Switzerland
- Coordinates: 47°41′21″N 8°29′41″E
- Elevation: 426 m (1,398 ft)
- Owner: Bundeseisenbahnvermögen (since 1994)
- Lines: High Rhine Railway (KBS 730)
- Distance: 351.5 km (218.4 mi) from Mannheim Hauptbahnhof
- Platforms: 2 side platforms
- Tracks: 2
- Train operators: SBB GmbH
- Connections: vbsh 21

Other information
- Fare zone: 830 (Tarifverbund Ostwind)

Services
Preceding station	Schaffhausen S-Bahn	Following station
Wilchingen-Hallau towards Erzingen (Baden)	S64	Beringen Bad Bf towards Schaffhausen
Location
- Location within Switzerland Location within Canton of Schaffhausen

Neunkirch railway station (German: Bahnhof Neunkirch) is a railway station in the municipality of Neunkirch, in the Swiss canton of Schaffhausen. It is located on the standard gauge High Rhine Railway of Deutsche Bahn.

== Services ==
As of the December 2023 timetable change, the following services stop at Neunkirch:

- Schaffhausen S-Bahn S64: half-hourly service between Erzingen (Baden) and Schaffhausen.
