= Wilchingen-Hallau railway station =

German owned railway station in Switzerland

Wilchingen-Hallau
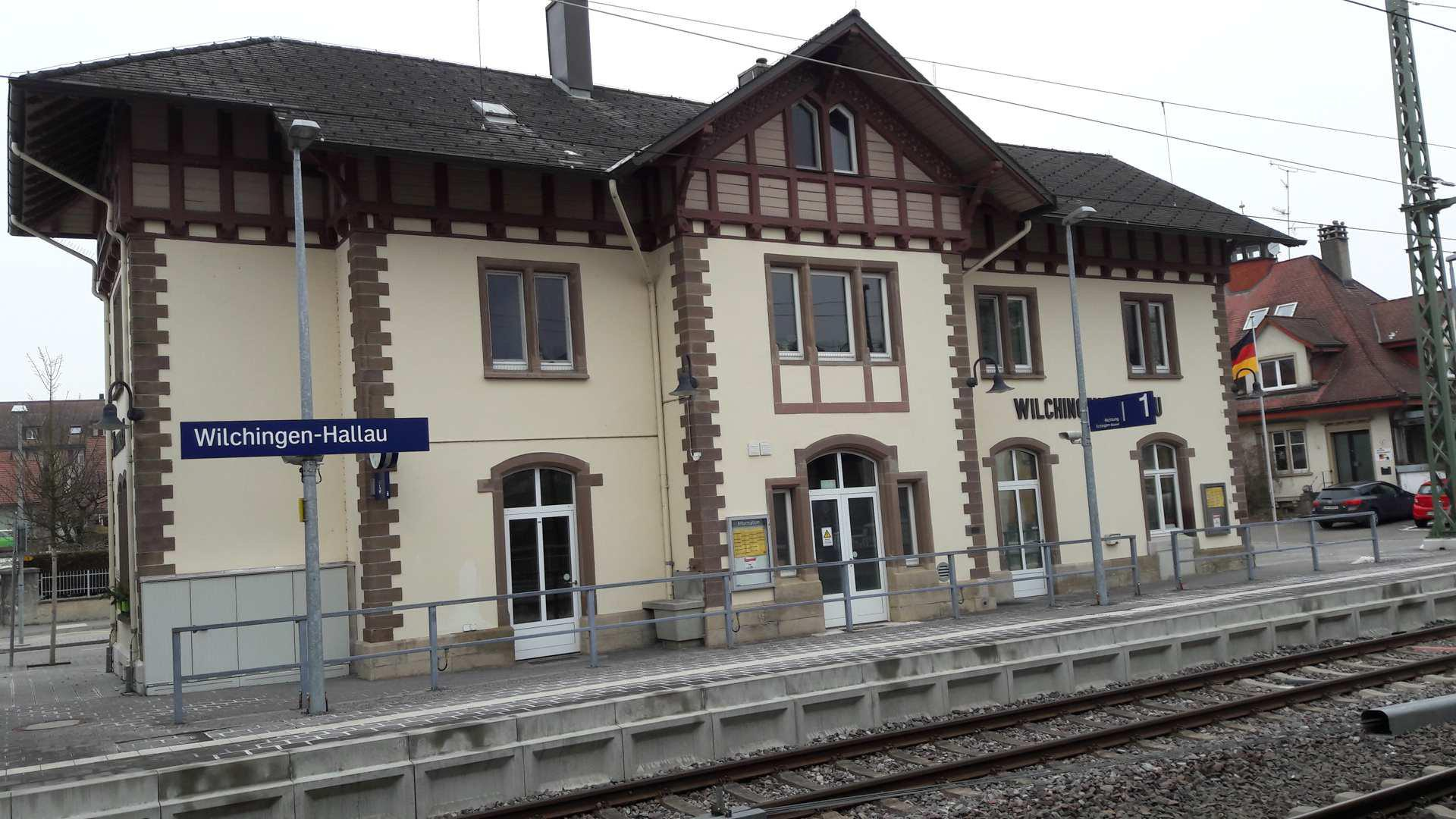
- The station in 2017

General information
- Location: Wilchingen, Schaffhausen; Switzerland
- Coordinates: 47°40′46″N 8°27′50″E
- Elevation: 413 m (1,355 ft)
- Owner: Bundeseisenbahnvermögen (since 1994)
- Lines: High Rhine Railway (KBS 730)
- Distance: 348.9 km (216.8 mi) from Mannheim Hauptbahnhof
- Platforms: 2 side platforms
- Tracks: 2
- Train operators: SBB GmbH
- Connections: vbsh 27

Other information
- Fare zone: 840 (Tarifverbund Ostwind)

Services
| Preceding station | Schaffhausen S-Bahn | Following station |
|---|---|---|
| Trasadingen towards Erzingen (Baden) | S64 | Neunkirch towards Schaffhausen |
Location
- Location within Switzerland Location within Canton of Schaffhausen

Wilchingen-Hallau railway station (German: Bahnhof Wilchingen-Hallau) is a railway station in the municipality of Wilchingen, in the Swiss canton of Schaffhausen. The station is situated between Wilchingen and Hallau, on the standard gauge High Rhine Railway of Deutsche Bahn.

== Services ==
=== Train services ===
As of the December 2023 timetable change, the following services stop at Wilchingen-Hallau:

- Schaffhausen S-Bahn S64: half-hourly service between Erzingen (Baden) and Schaffhausen.

=== Bus services ===
Local bus routes offer services to passengers travelling between the station and Hallau, Osterfingen as well as Oberhallau.
