= Bargen, Schaffhausen =

Bargen
- Municipality
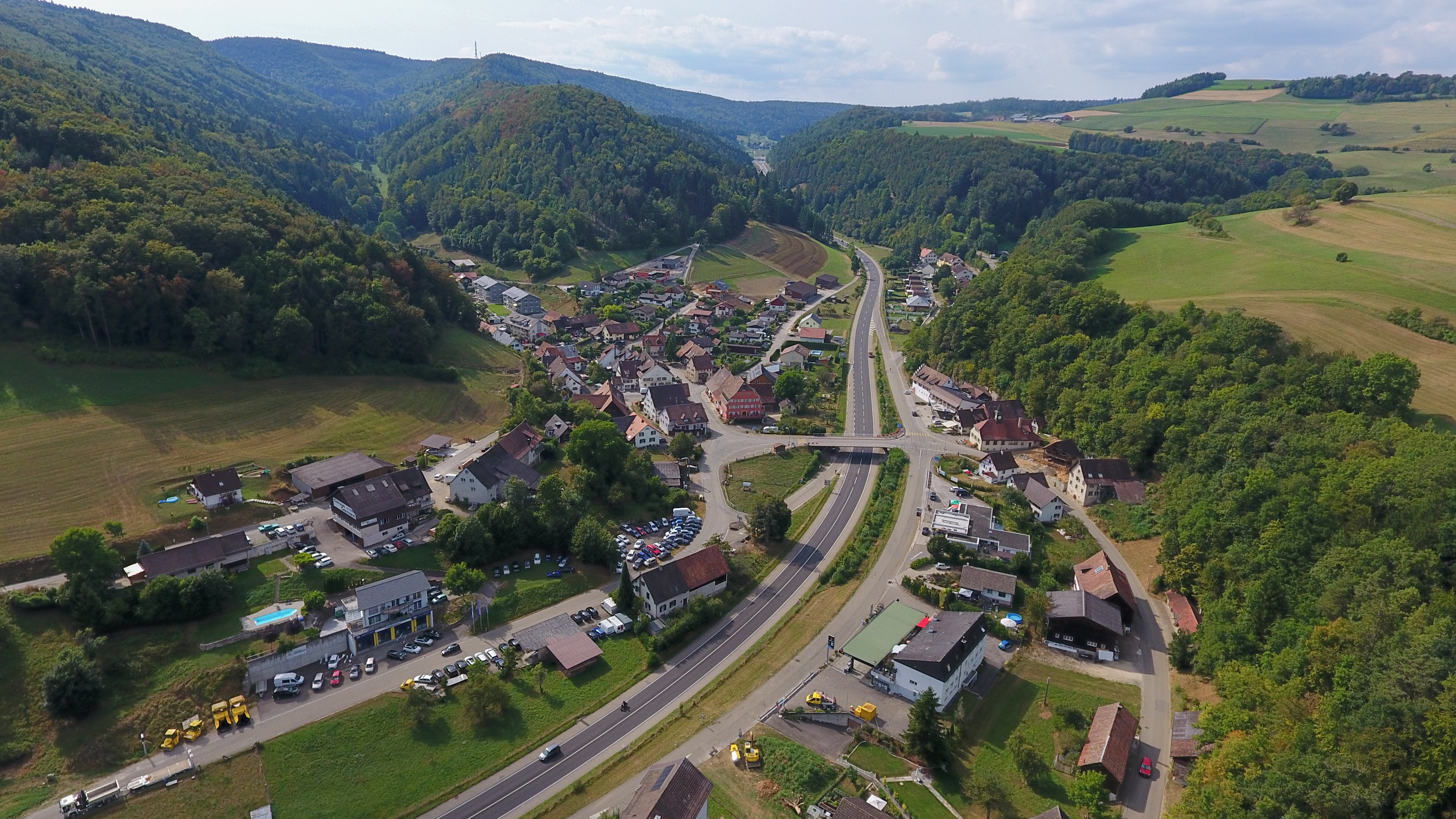

- Flag Coat of arms
- Location of Bargen
- Location within Switzerland Location within Canton of Schaffhausen
- Coordinates: 47°47′N 8°36′E
- Country: Switzerland
- Canton: Schaffhausen
- District: n.a.

Government
  - Mayor: Erich Graf (as of 2012)

Area
  - Total: 8.27 km^{2} (3.19 sq mi)
- Elevation: 605 m (1,985 ft)

Population (December 2008)
  - Total: 249
  - Density: 30.1/km^{2} (78.0/sq mi)
- Time zone: UTC+01:00 (CET)
  - Summer (DST): UTC+02:00 (CEST)
- Postal code: 8233
- SFOS number: 2931
- ISO 3166 code: CH-SH
- Localities: Oberbargen
- Surrounded by: Blumberg (DE-BW), Merishausen, Tengen (DE-BW)
- Website: bargen.ch

Bargen (Swiss Standard German pronunciation: [ˈbarɡn̩]) is a municipality in the canton of Schaffhausen in Switzerland. The northernmost point of the country is situated in the municipality, at Oberbargen.

== History ==
Bargen is first mentioned in 884 as Paragen.

== Geography ==
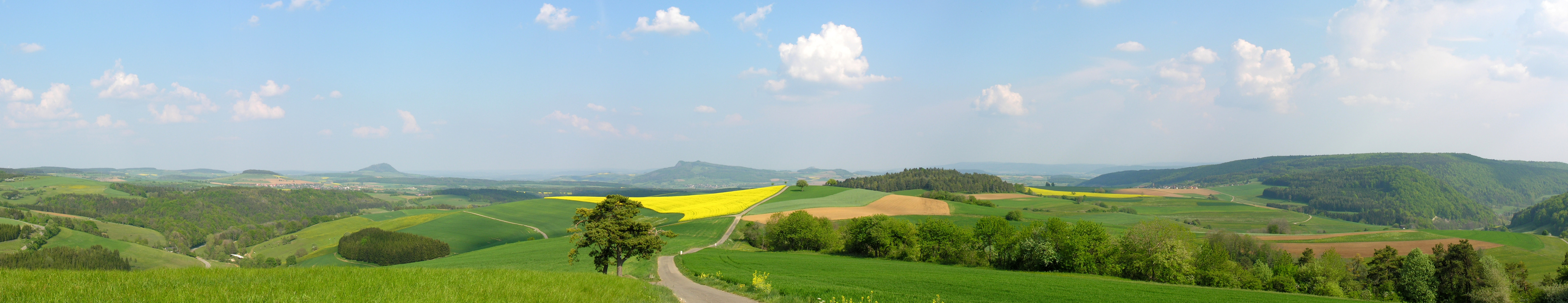
View of the countryside around Bargen

Aerial view (1964)

Bargen has an area, as of 2006, of 8.3 km^{2} (3.2 sq mi). Of this area, 29.2% is used for agricultural purposes, while 65.8% is forested. Of the rest of the land, 4.8% is settled (buildings or roads) and the remainder (0.2%) is non-productive (rivers, glaciers or mountains).

The municipality is located in the Schaffhausen district. It is a farming village on the northernmost point of Switzerland. The municipality includes a notable protected natural area, Tannbüehl, which is known for its over 20 varieties of orchids.

== Demographics ==
Bargen has a population (as of 2008) of 249, of which 12.4% are foreign nationals. Of the foreign population, (as of 2008), 60% are from Germany, 22.9% are from Italy, 11.4% are from Croatia, and 5.7% are from another country. Over the last 10 years the population has decreased at a rate of -2.1%. Most of the population (as of 2000) speaks German (96.0%), with Italian being second most common ( 1.6%) and Serbo-Croatian being third ( 1.2%). There is also a small but significant population of Poles. (0.23)

The age distribution of the population (as of 2008) is children and teenagers (0–19 years old) make up 18.9% of the population, while adults (20–64 years old) make up 59.8% and seniors (over 64 years old) make up 21.3%.

In the 2007 federal election the most popular party was the SVP which received 65.2% of the vote. The next two most popular parties were the SP (23.7%), and the FDP (11.2%).

The entire Swiss population is generally well educated. In Bargen about 73.6% of the population (between age 25–64) have completed either non-mandatory upper secondary education or additional higher education (either university or a Fachhochschule). In Bargen, as of 2007, 3.86% of the population is attending kindergarten or another pre-school, 8.58% are attending a Primary School, 3.86% attend a lower level Secondary School, and 2.58% attend a higher level Secondary School.

As of 2000, 20.6% of the population belonged to the Roman Catholic Church and 61.7% belonged to the Swiss Reformed Church in Bargen.

The historical population is given in the following table:

| year | population |
|---|---|
| 1850 | 327 |
| 1900 | 226 |
| 1950 | 203 |
| 2000 | 248 |

== Coat of arms ==
The blazon of the municipal coat of arms is Or a Plumb Sable topped with a Hat of the same trimmed Argent feathered Vert, Gules and of the first.

== Industry ==
Bargen has an unemployment rate of 1.15%. As of 2005, there were 22 people employed in the primary economic sector and about 9 businesses involved in this sector. 5 people are employed in the secondary sector and there are 2 businesses in this sector. 68 people are employed in the tertiary sector, with 11 businesses in this sector.

As of 2008 the mid year average unemployment rate was 1.8%. There were 12 non-agrarian businesses in the municipality and 5.1% of the (non-agrarian) population was involved in the secondary sector of the economy while 94.9% were involved in the third. At the same time, 71.2% of the working population was employed full-time, and 28.8% was employed part-time. There were 59 residents of the municipality were employed in some capacity, of which females made up 54.2% of the workforce. As of 2000 there were 42 residents who worked in the municipality, while 83 residents worked outside Bargen and 26 people commuted into the municipality for work.

As of 2008, there are 2 restaurants, and 1 hotel with 10 beds. The hospitality industry in Bargen employs 6 people.

== Transportation ==
The A4 expressway passes through Bargen and enters into Germany after a customs facility.

== Places of interest ==
The "Tannbuel" is a well-known conservation area in the Randen forest, with at least 20 different orchid varieties present. Hundreds of visitors to go the area every year, in order to experience the "Frauenschueli"-orchid flush in May and June.
