= Buch, Schaffhausen =

Buch
- Municipality
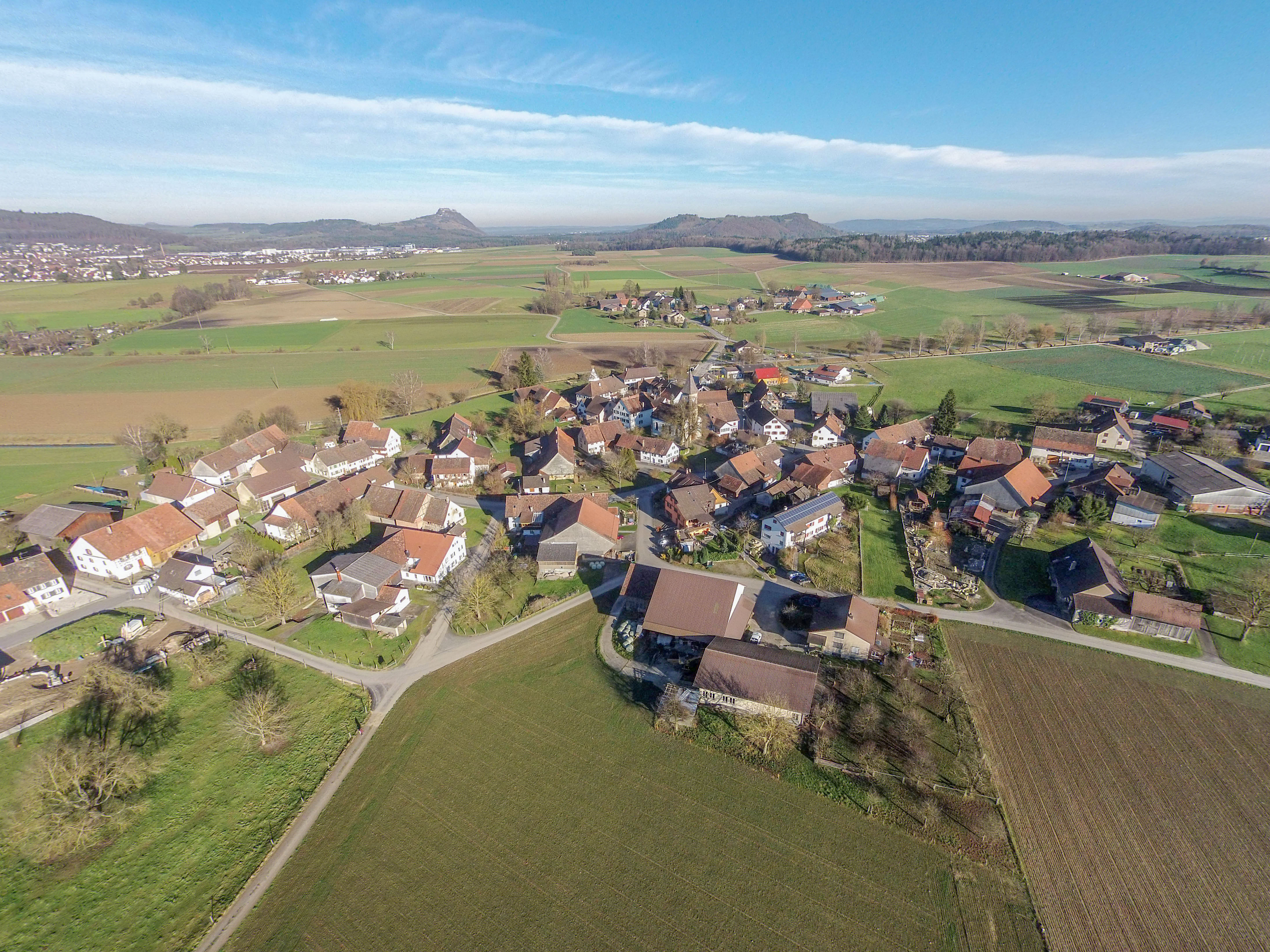

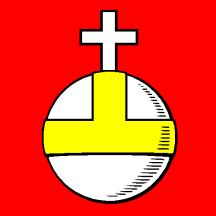
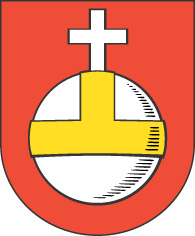
- Flag Coat of arms
- Location of Buch
- Location within Switzerland Location within Canton of Schaffhausen
- Coordinates: 47°43′N 8°47′E
- Country: Switzerland
- Canton: Schaffhausen
- District: n.a.

Area
  - Total: 3.80 km^{2} (1.47 sq mi)
- Elevation: 416 m (1,365 ft)

Population (December 2008)
  - Total: 296
  - Density: 77.9/km^{2} (202/sq mi)
- Time zone: UTC+01:00 (CET)
  - Summer (DST): UTC+02:00 (CEST)
- Postal code: 8263
- SFOS number: 2961
- ISO 3166 code: CH-SH
- Surrounded by: Gailingen am Hochrhein (DE-BW), Gottmadingen (DE-BW), Ramsen
- Website: buch-sh.ch

Buch (German pronunciation: [buːx]) is a municipality in the canton of Schaffhausen in Switzerland.

== History ==
Buch is first mentioned in 1080 when Gerolt von Buch appears as a witness in a document.

== Coat of arms ==
The blazon of the municipal coat of arms is Gules an Orb Argent banded Or and crossed of the second.

== Geography ==
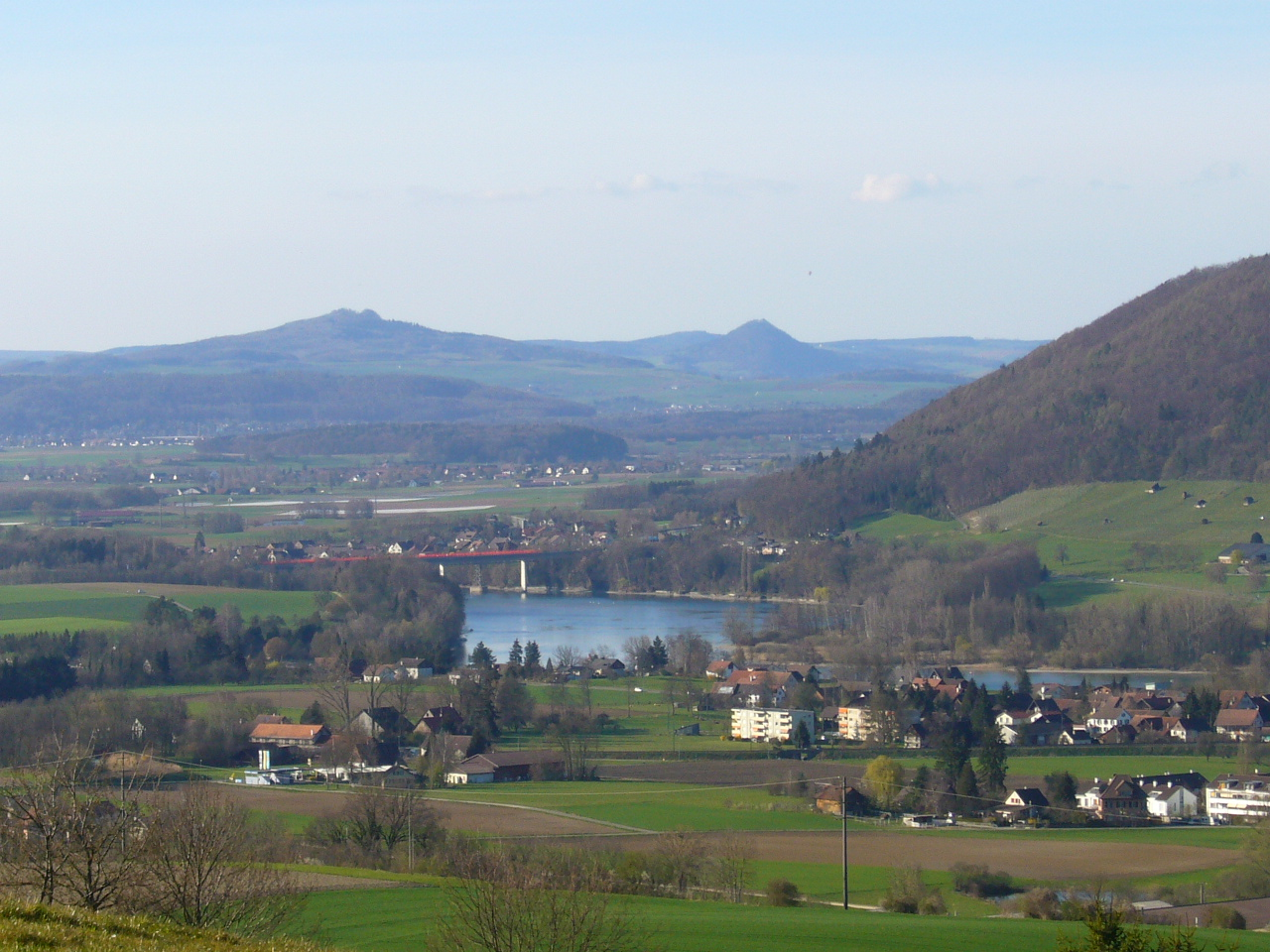
The Rhine river and Hemishofen (with Ramsen and Buch in the background) below the town of Stein.

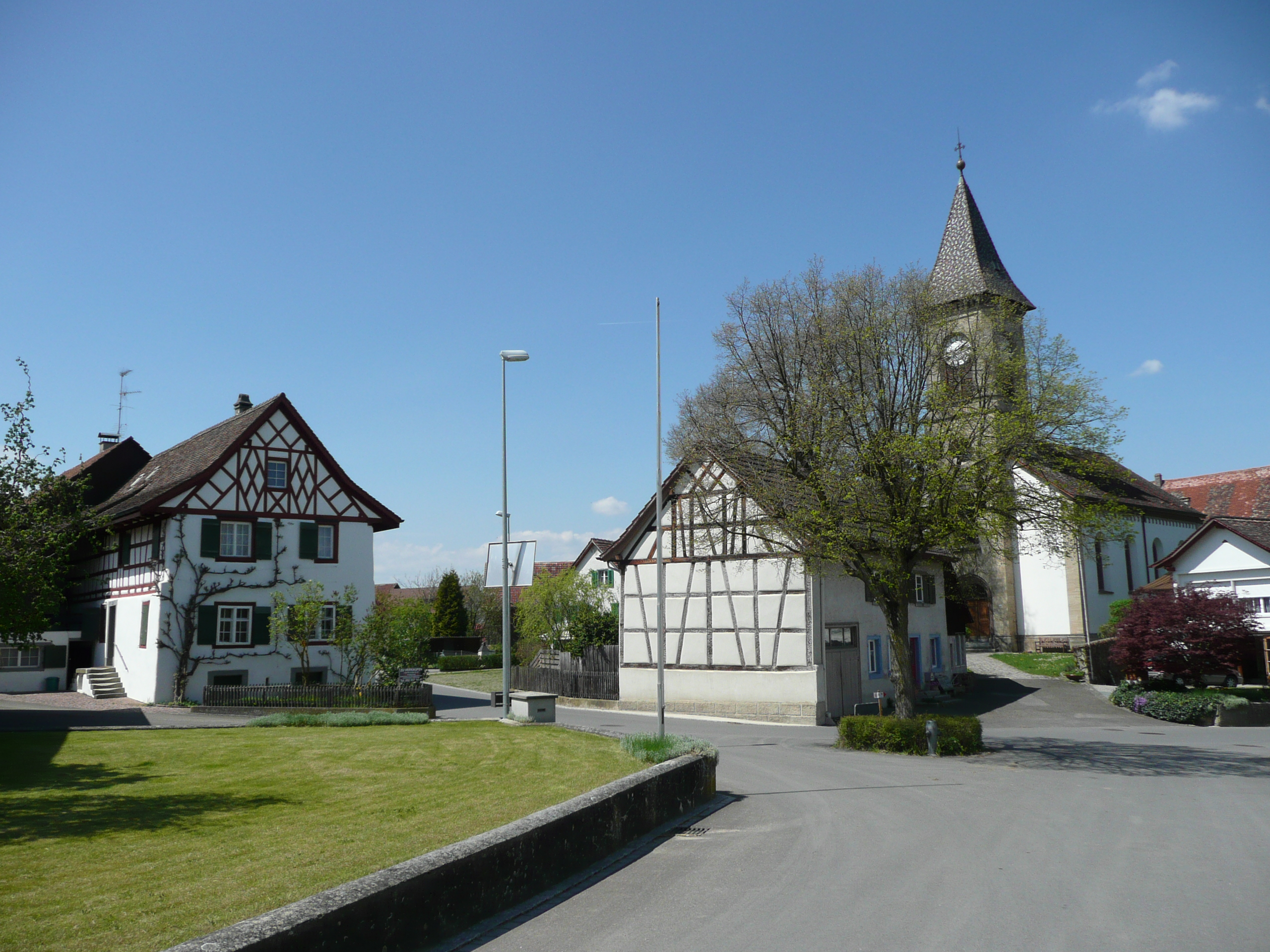
Village center

Aerial view (1958)

Buch has an area, as of 2006, of 3.8 km^{2} (1.5 sq mi). Of this area, 74.7% is used for agricultural purposes, while 19.6% is forested. Of the rest of the land, 5.5% is settled (buildings or roads) and the remainder (0.3%) is non-productive (rivers, glaciers or mountains).

The municipality is located in the Stein district. It is a farm village on the Biber river which empties into the Rhine.

== Demographics ==
Buch has a population (as of 2008) of 296, of which 20.3% are foreign nationals. Of the foreign population, (as of 2008), 83.3% are from Germany, and 16.7% are from another country. Over the last 10 years the population has grown at a rate of 6.8%. Most of the population (as of 2000) speaks German (74.8%), with Turkish being second most common ( 5.3%) and Arabic being third ( 2.3%).

The age distribution of the population (as of 2008) is children and teenagers (0–19 years old) make up 22% of the population, while adults (20–64 years old) make up 62.8% and seniors (over 64 years old) make up 15.2%.

In the 2007 federal election the most popular party was the SVP which received 65.4% of the vote. The next two most popular parties were the SP (27.6%), and the FDP (7%) .

The entire Swiss population is generally well educated. In Buch about 64% of the population (between age 25–64) have completed either non-mandatory upper secondary education or additional higher education (either university or a Fachhochschule). In Buch, as of 2007, 0.66% of the population is attending kindergarten or another pre-school, 4.32% are attending a Primary School, 4.65% attend a lower level Secondary School, and 4.98% attend a higher level Secondary School.

As of 2000, 15% of the population belonged to the Roman Catholic Church and 51.9% belonged to the Swiss Reformed Church.

The historical population is given in the following table:

year	population
1836	288
1850	399
1900	389
1910	348
1950	329
1980	259
2000	341

== Economy and Infrastructure ==
Buch has an unemployment rate of 0.71%. As of 2005, there were 28 people employed in the primary economic sector and about 11 businesses involved in this sector. 6 people are employed in the secondary sector and there are 4 businesses in this sector. 60 people are employed in the tertiary sector, with 7 businesses in this sector.

As of 2008 the mid year average unemployment rate was 0.9%. There were 9 non-agrarian businesses in the municipality and 21.1% of the (non-agrarian) population was involved in the secondary sector of the economy while 78.9% were involved in the third. At the same time, 78.9% of the working population was employed full-time, and 21.1% was employed part-time. There were 19 residents of the municipality were employed in some capacity, of which females made up 26.3% of the workforce. As of 2000 there were 43 residents who worked in the municipality, while 85 residents worked outside Buch and 9 people commuted into the municipality for work.

As of 2008, there is 1 restaurant in Buch and the hospitality industry employs 2 people.
