= Dörflingen =

- Municipality
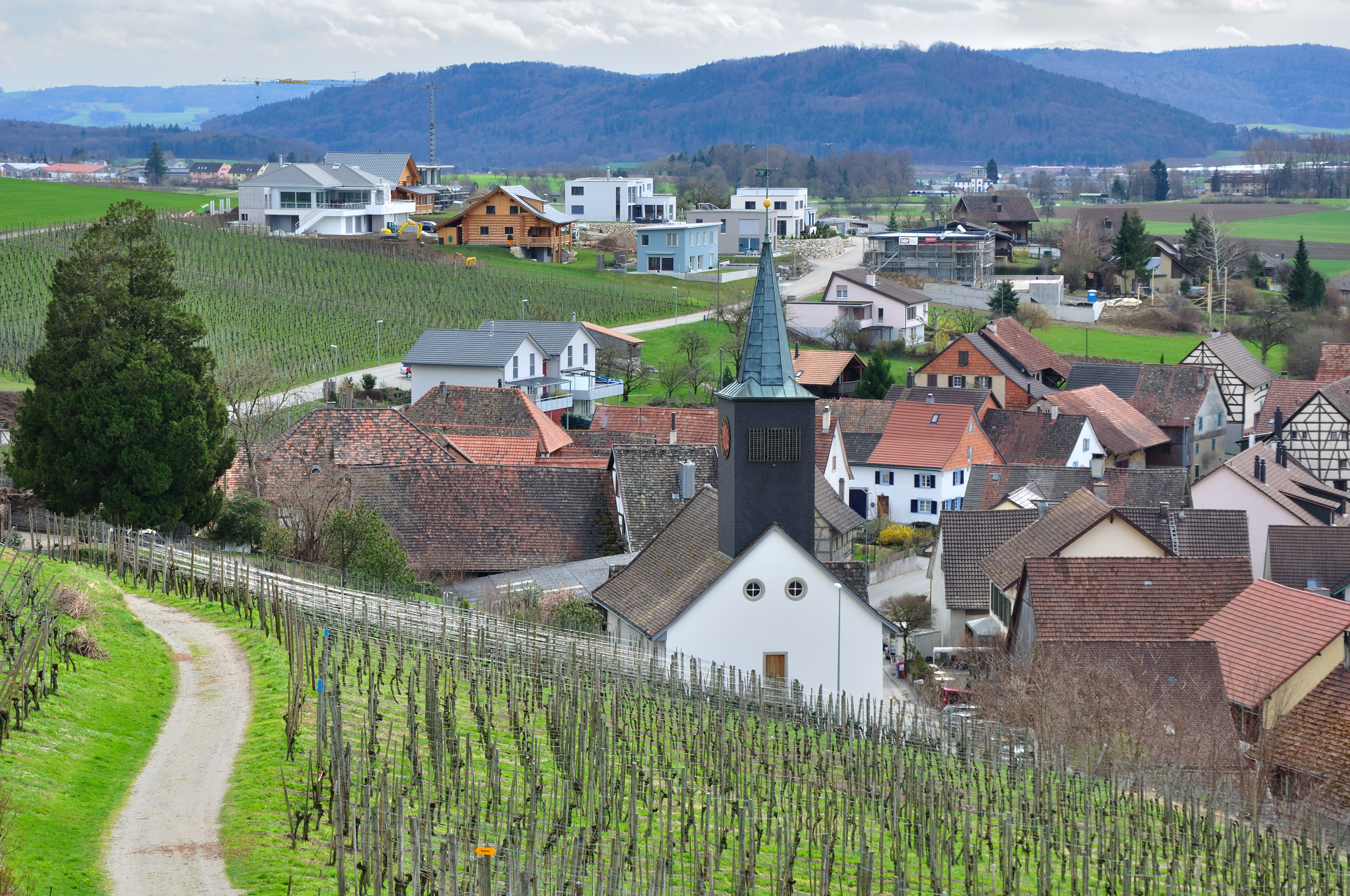

- Flag Coat of arms
- Location of Dörflingen
- Location within Switzerland Location within Canton of Schaffhausen
- Coordinates: 47°42′N 8°43′E
- Country: Switzerland
- Canton: Schaffhausen
- District: n.a.

Area
  - Total: 5.82 km^{2} (2.25 sq mi)
- Elevation: 451 m (1,480 ft)

Population (December 2008)
  - Total: 776
  - Density: 133/km^{2} (345/sq mi)
- Time zone: UTC+01:00 (CET)
  - Summer (DST): UTC+02:00 (CEST)
- Postal code: 8239
- SFOS number: 2915
- ISO 3166 code: CH-SH
- Surrounded by: Büsingen am Hochrhein (DE-BW), Diessenhofen (TG), Gailingen am Hochrhein (DE-BW), Gottmadingen (DE-BW), Schaffhausen, Thayngen
- Website: doerflingen.ch

Dörflingen is a village and a municipality in the canton of Schaffhausen in Switzerland. It borders a short strip of the north shore of the Rhine.

== History ==
Dörflingen is first mentioned in 1264 as Dorfelingen.

== Geography ==
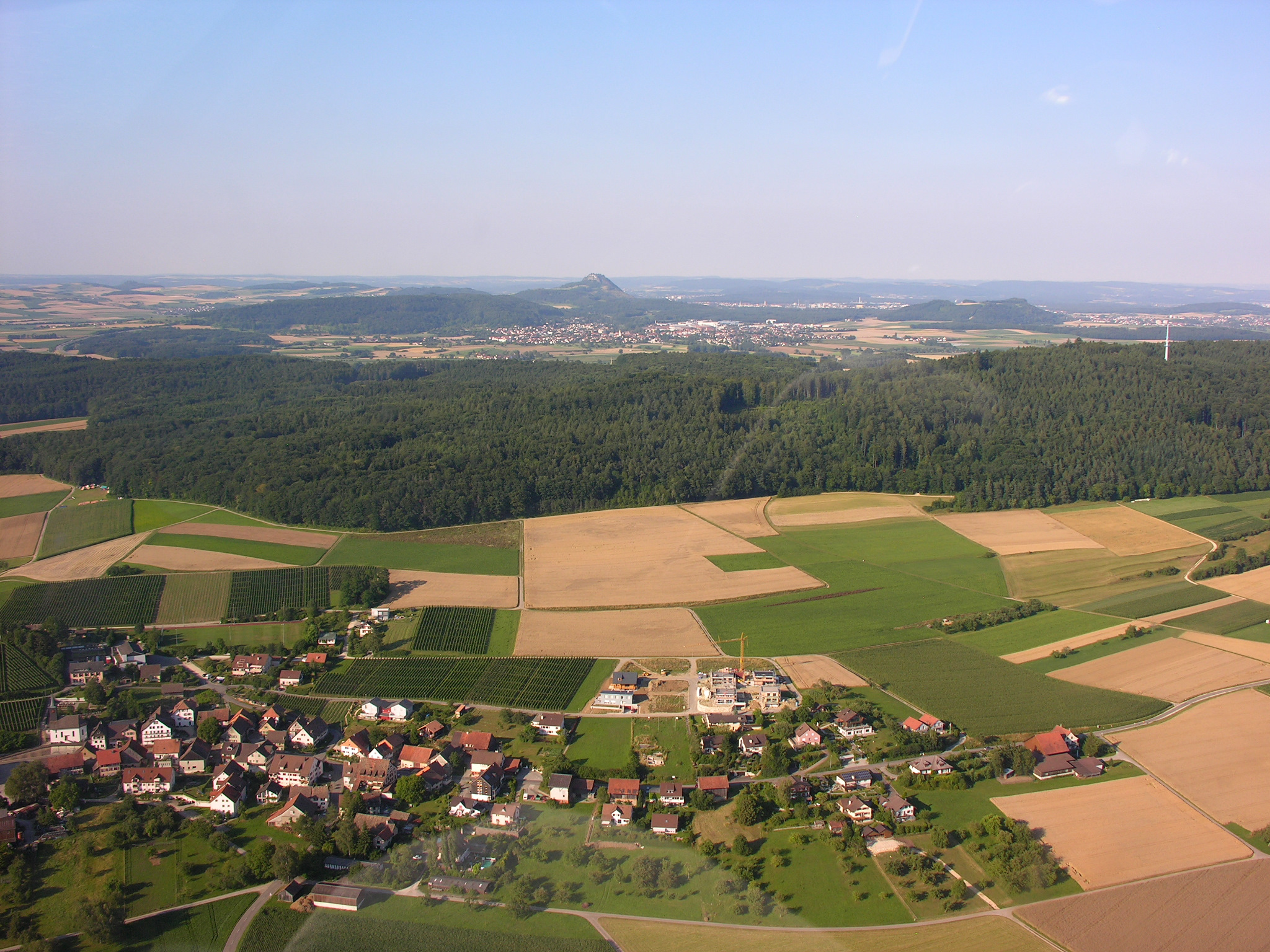
Dörflingen from the air

Aerial view (1953)

Dörflingen has an area, as of 2006, of 5.8 km^{2} (2.2 sq mi). Of this area, 64.3% is used for agricultural purposes, while 26.9% is forested. Of the rest of the land, 7.5% is settled (buildings or roads) and the remainder (1.4%) is non-productive (rivers or lakes).

Dörflingen is located in the Reiat district, about 6 km (3.7 mi) east of Schaffhausen and has two separate international borders with Germany, one of which being with the German exclave of Büsingen am Hochrhein.

== Economy ==
Dörflingen has an unemployment rate of 1.02%. As of 2005, there were 60 people employed in the primary economic sector and about 26 businesses involved in this sector. 68 people are employed in the secondary sector and there are 9 businesses in this sector. 56 people are employed in the tertiary sector, with 14 businesses in this sector.

As of 2008 the mid year average unemployment rate was 1.3%. There were 22 non-agrarian businesses in the municipality and 64.2% of the (non-agrarian) population was involved in the secondary sector of the economy while 35.8% were involved in the third. At the same time, 72.4% of the working population was employed full-time, and 27.6% was employed part-time. There were 123 residents of the municipality who were employed in some capacity, of which females made up 26% of the workforce. As of 2000 there were 81 residents who worked in the municipality, while 319 residents worked outside Dörflingen and 41 people commuted into the municipality for work.

As of 2008, there is 1 restaurant and the hospitality industry in Dörflingen employs 7 people.

== Demographics ==
Dörflingen has a population (as of 31 December 2020) of 1,010. In 2008 a total of 11.6% of the population were foreign nationals. Of the foreign population, (as of 2008), 53.2% are from Germany, 13.8% are from Italy, 1.1% are from Croatia, 1.1% are from Serbia, and 30.9% are from another country. Over the last 10 years the population has grown at a rate of 3.9%. Most of the population (as of 2000) speaks German (96.6%), with Italian being second most common (1.4%) and Serbo-Croatian being third (0.8%).

The age distribution of the population (as of 2008) is children and teenagers (0–19 years old) make up 22.7% of the population, while adults (20–64 years old) make up 62.9% and seniors (over 64 years old) make up 14.4%.

In the 2007 federal election the most popular party was the SVP which received 42.9% of the vote. The next two most popular parties were the SP (28.7%), and the FDP (28.3%) .

The entire Swiss population is generally well educated. In Dörflingen about 86.2% of the population (between age 25–64) have completed either non-mandatory upper secondary education or additional higher education (either university or a Fachhochschule). In Dörflingen, as of 2007, 1.4% of the population attend kindergarten or another pre-school, 7.11% attend a Primary School, 4.82% attend a lower level Secondary School, and 3.17% attend a higher level Secondary School.

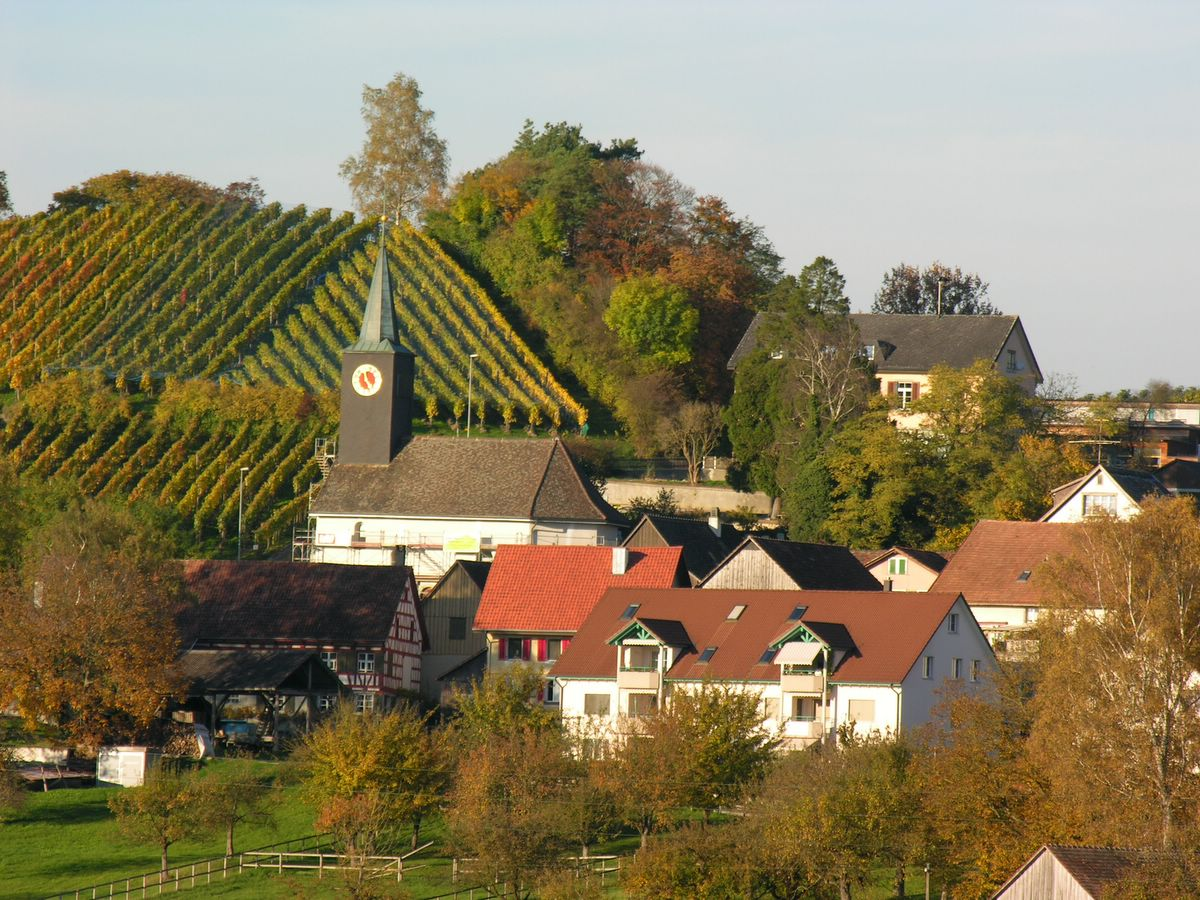
Dörflingen village church

As of 2000, 18.9% of the population belonged to the Roman Catholic Church and 61.7% belonged to the Swiss Reformed Church.

The historical population is given in the following table:

year	population
1689	396
1704	340
1850	560
1900	426
1930	418
1950	458
1990	582
2000	785

== Sights ==
The village of Dörflingen is designated as part of the Inventory of Swiss Heritage Sites.

== Images ==
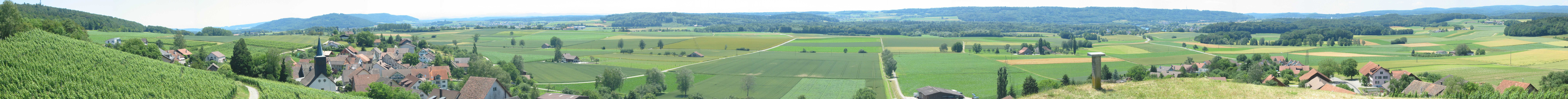
Dörflingen seen from Buck
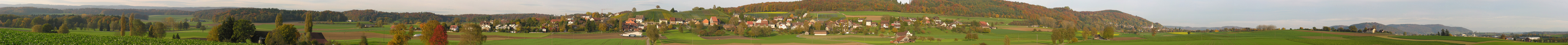
Dörflingen

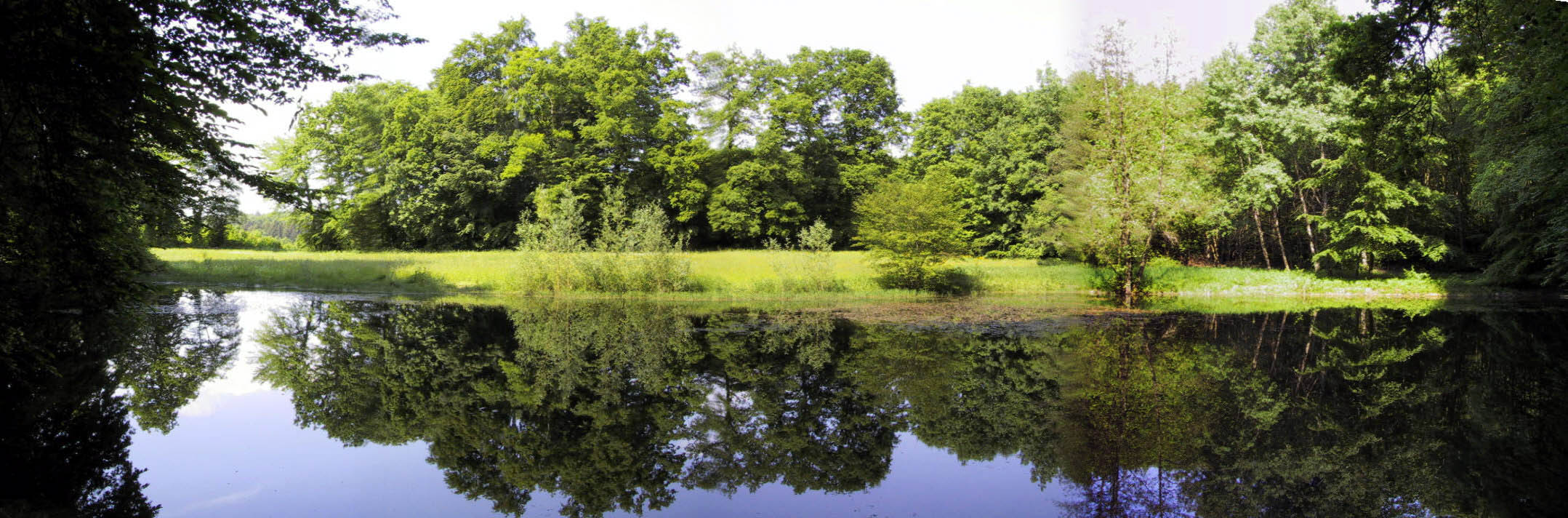
The "Seeli", a pond between Dörflingen and Randegg
