= Wilchingen =

- Municipality
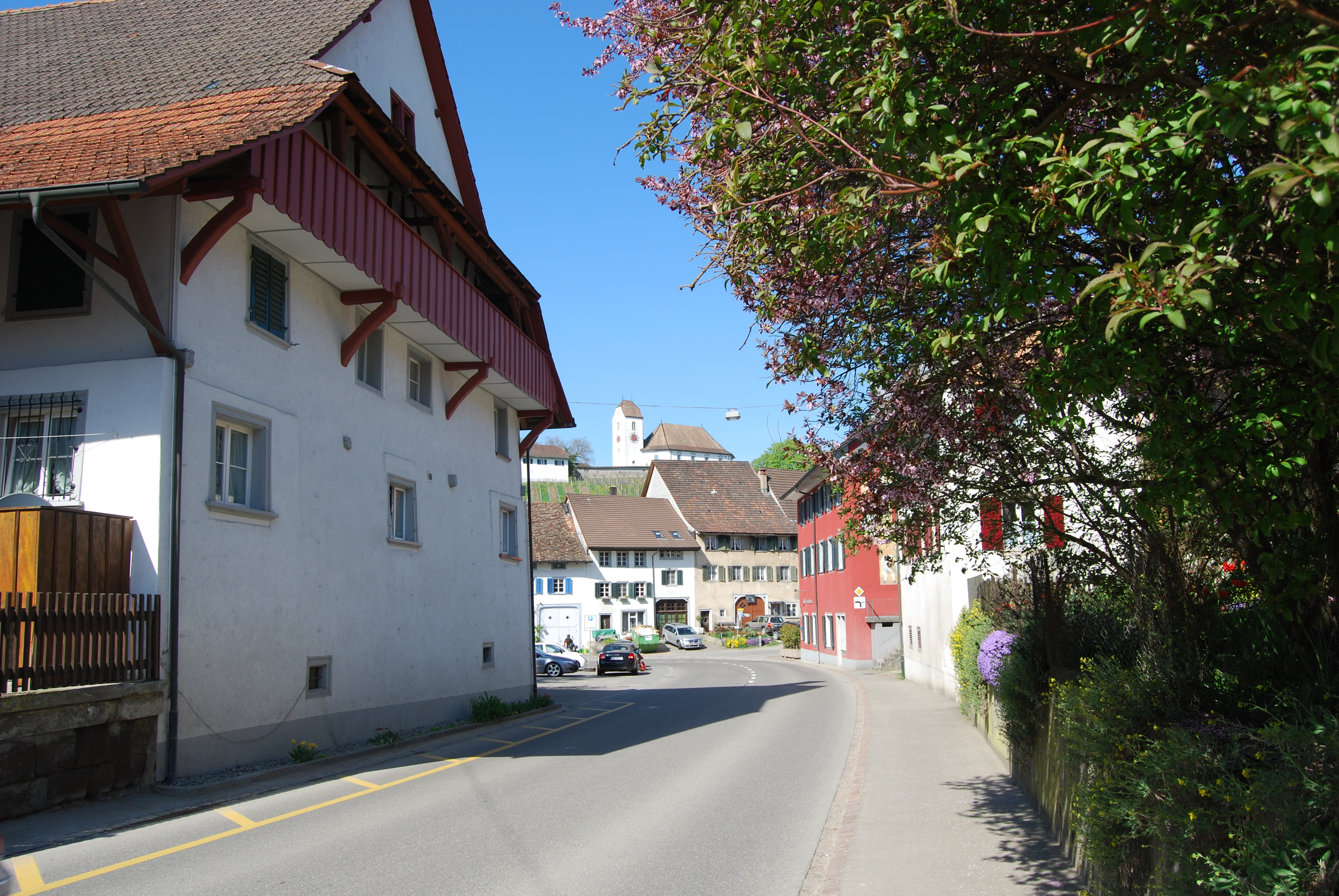

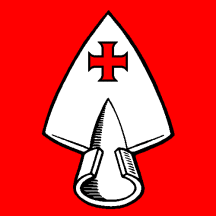
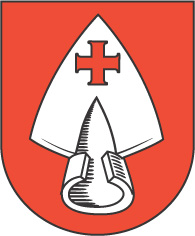
- Flag Coat of arms
- Location of Wilchingen
- Location within Switzerland Location within Canton of Schaffhausen
- Coordinates: 47°40′N 8°28′E
- Country: Switzerland
- Canton: Schaffhausen
- District: n.a.

Area
  - Total: 21.10 km^{2} (8.15 sq mi)
- Elevation: 419 m (1,375 ft)

Population (December 2008)
  - Total: 1,692
  - Density: 80.19/km^{2} (207.7/sq mi)
- Time zone: UTC+01:00 (CET)
  - Summer (DST): UTC+02:00 (CEST)
- Postal code: 8217
- SFOS number: 2974
- ISO 3166 code: CH-SH
- Surrounded by: Dettighofen (DE-BW), Eggingen (DE-BW), Hallau, Jestetten (DE-BW), Klettgau (DE-BW), Neunkirch, Trasadingen
- Website: www.wilchingen.ch

Wilchingen is a municipality in the canton of Schaffhausen in Switzerland. The former municipality of Osterfingen was incorporated into Wilchingen in 2005.

== Geography ==
Aerial view by Walter Mittelholzer (1919)

Wilchingen has an area, as of 2006, of 21.2 km^{2} (8.2 sq mi). Of this area, 50.6% is used for agricultural purposes, while 42.1% is forested. Of the rest of the land, 6.9% is settled (buildings or roads) and the remainder (0.4%) is non-productive (rivers or lakes). In 2005 the village of Osterfingen merged into Wilchingen.

== Coat of arms ==
The blazon of the municipal coat of arms is Gules a Ploughshare Argent voided in Cross pattee.

== Demographics ==
Wilchingen has a population (as of 2008) of 1,692, of which 11.2% are foreign nationals. Of the foreign population, (as of 2008), 38.5% are from Germany, 15.5% are from Italy, 1.6% are from Croatia, 18.7% are from Serbia, 4.8% are from Macedonia, and 20.9% are from another country. Over the last 10 years the population has decreased at a rate of -1.2%. Most of the population (as of 2000) speaks German (93.8%), with Albanian being second most common (1.6%) and Italian being third ( 1.1%).

The age distribution of the population (as of 2008) is children and teenagers (0–19 years old) make up 15.7% of the population, while adults (20–64 years old) make up 58.5% and seniors (over 64 years old) make up 25.8%.

In the 2007 federal election the most popular party was the SVP which received 43.8% of the vote. The next two most popular parties were the FDP (28.6%), and the SP (27.5%) .

| year | population |
|---|---|
| 1990 | 1,571 |
| 2000 | 1,646 |

In Wilchingen about 79.7% of the population (between age 25–64) have completed either non-mandatory upper secondary education or additional higher education (either university or a Fachhochschule). In Wilchingen, as of 2007, 2.37% of the population attend kindergarten or another pre-school, 8.64% attend a Primary School, 4.8% attend a lower level Secondary School, and 3.43% attend a higher level Secondary School.

As of 2000, 11.9% of the population belonged to the Roman Catholic Church and 74.3% belonged to the Swiss Reformed Church.

== Economy ==
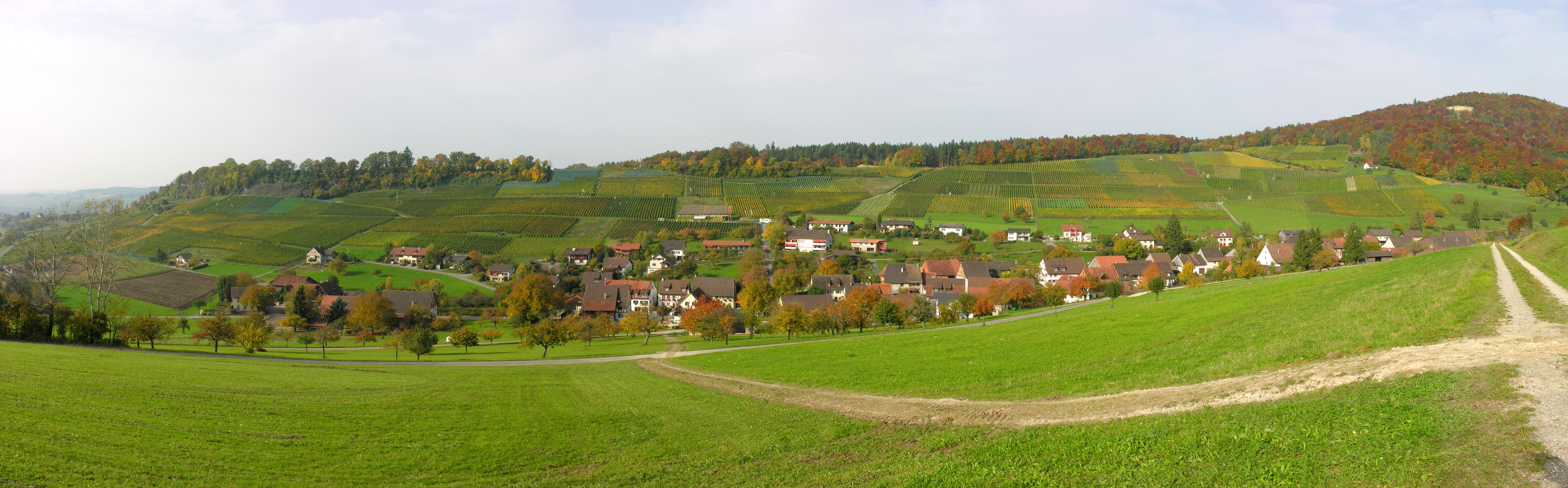
Osterfingen village near Wilchingen

Wilchingen has an unemployment rate of 0.7%. As of 2005, there were 211 people employed in the primary economic sector and about 70 businesses involved in this sector. 203 people are employed in the secondary sector and there are 22 businesses in this sector. 336 people are employed in the tertiary sector, with 50 businesses in this sector.

As of 2008 the mid year average unemployment rate was 1.6%. There were 69 non-agrarian businesses in the municipality and 38.3% of the (non-agrarian) population was involved in the secondary sector of the economy while 61.7% were involved in the third. At the same time, 62.5% of the working population was employed full-time, and 37.5% was employed part-time. There were 554 residents of the municipality who were employed in some capacity, of which females made up 44.4% of the workforce. As of 2000 there were 347 residents who worked in the municipality, while 450 residents worked outside Wilchingen and 181 people commuted into the municipality for work.

As of 2008, there are 3 restaurants, and 1 hotel with 8 beds. The hospitality industry in Wilchingen employs 40 people.

== Transport ==
There are two official border crossings into Germany in the municipality - one in Zollstrasse, Osterfingen with Jestetten in Waldshut district, Baden-Württemberg and one in Löchlistrasse, Wilchingen, with Weisweil.

Wilchingen also has a railway station, Wilchingen-Hallau. It is located on the standard gauge High Rhine Railway run by Deutsche Bahn.

== Heritage sites of national significance ==
The early Neolithic settlement at Underflüe and the Neolithic hilltop settlement at Flühhalde as well as the Trottenhaus and another house in the village of Osterfingen are listed as Swiss heritage sites of national significance.

== Weather ==
Wilchingen has an average of 123.6 days of rain or snow per year and on average receives 938 mm (36.9 in) of precipitation. The wettest month is August during which time Wilchingen receives an average of 101 mm (4.0 in) of rain or snow. During this month there is precipitation for an average of 11 days. The month with the most days of precipitation is May, with an average of 12.2, but with only 76 mm (3.0 in) of rain or snow. The driest month of the year is September with an average of 65 mm (2.6 in) of precipitation over 11 days.
