= Laufen Castle (Switzerland) =

Castle in Zurich, Switzerland

- Schloss Laufen
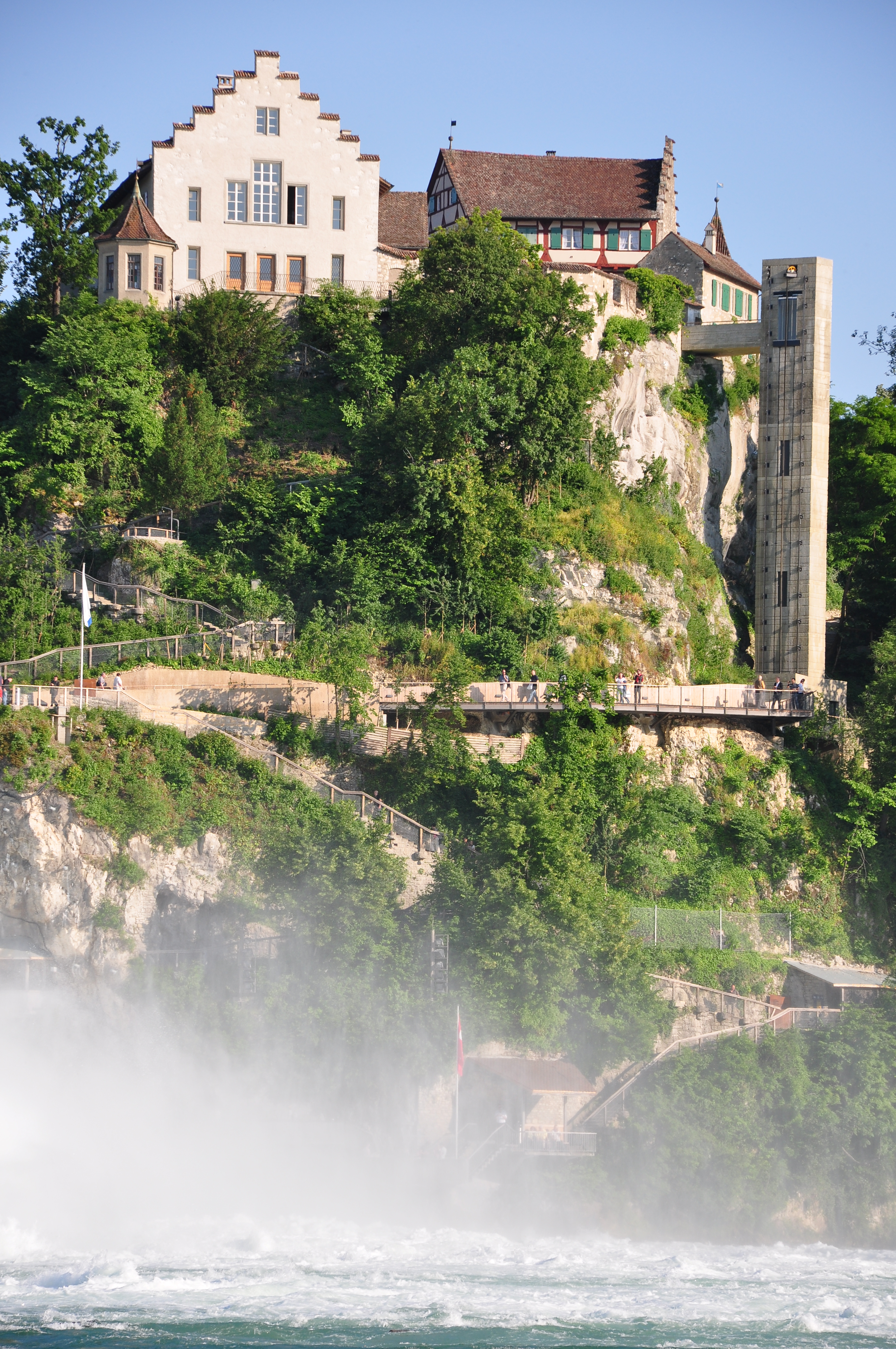
- Laufen Castle with walkways and lift tower, 2010

- Location in Switzerland Location in the canton of Zurich
- Interactive map of the Laufen Castle area

General information
- Location: Rheinfallweg, Laufen-Uhwiesen, Switzerland
- Coordinates: 47°40′35.66″N 8°36′54.14″E
- Construction started: c. 850s

Website
- http://www.schlosslaufen.ch/en.html

Laufen Castle (German: Schloss Laufen) is a castle in the municipality of Laufen-Uhwiesen in the Swiss canton of Zurich. It is a Swiss heritage site of national significance overlooking the Rhine Falls.

The first documented reference to the castle dates to the year 858 when it was the home of the Barons of Laufen. It passed through several owners until the Old Zurich War (1439–1450) when the castle was acquired by the Fulach family, from whom the city of Zurich bought the castle in 1544. Following the Helvetic Republic (1798–1803), the castle was once again in private ownership, with the city of Zurich reacquiring the castle by buying it again in 1941.

The castle now serves as a tourist attraction, and contains a restaurant and a youth hostel. Between 2009 and 2010, a project was undertaken to restore and expand the facilities, including a visitors’ centre situated in the former staff quarters, an exhibition in the northern part of the castle, and a wheelchair-accessible circular walkway with glass lift between castle and river levels. Laufen is overlooking Wörth Castle, on the opposite side of the High Rhine, located in the canton of Schaffhausen.

== Transport ==
The Rheinfall railway line passes through a tunnel under the castle, halting at the Schloss Laufen am Rheinfall station to the south of the tunnel and beneath the castle walls. The station is linked to the castle by a walkway and an elevator. The station is served by the S12 and S33 services of Zurich S-Bahn to Schaffhausen and Winterthur/Zürich HB.

In addition, PostAuto bus line 634 operates between Schaffhausen railway station and Schloss Laufen am Rheinfall.

== Gallery ==
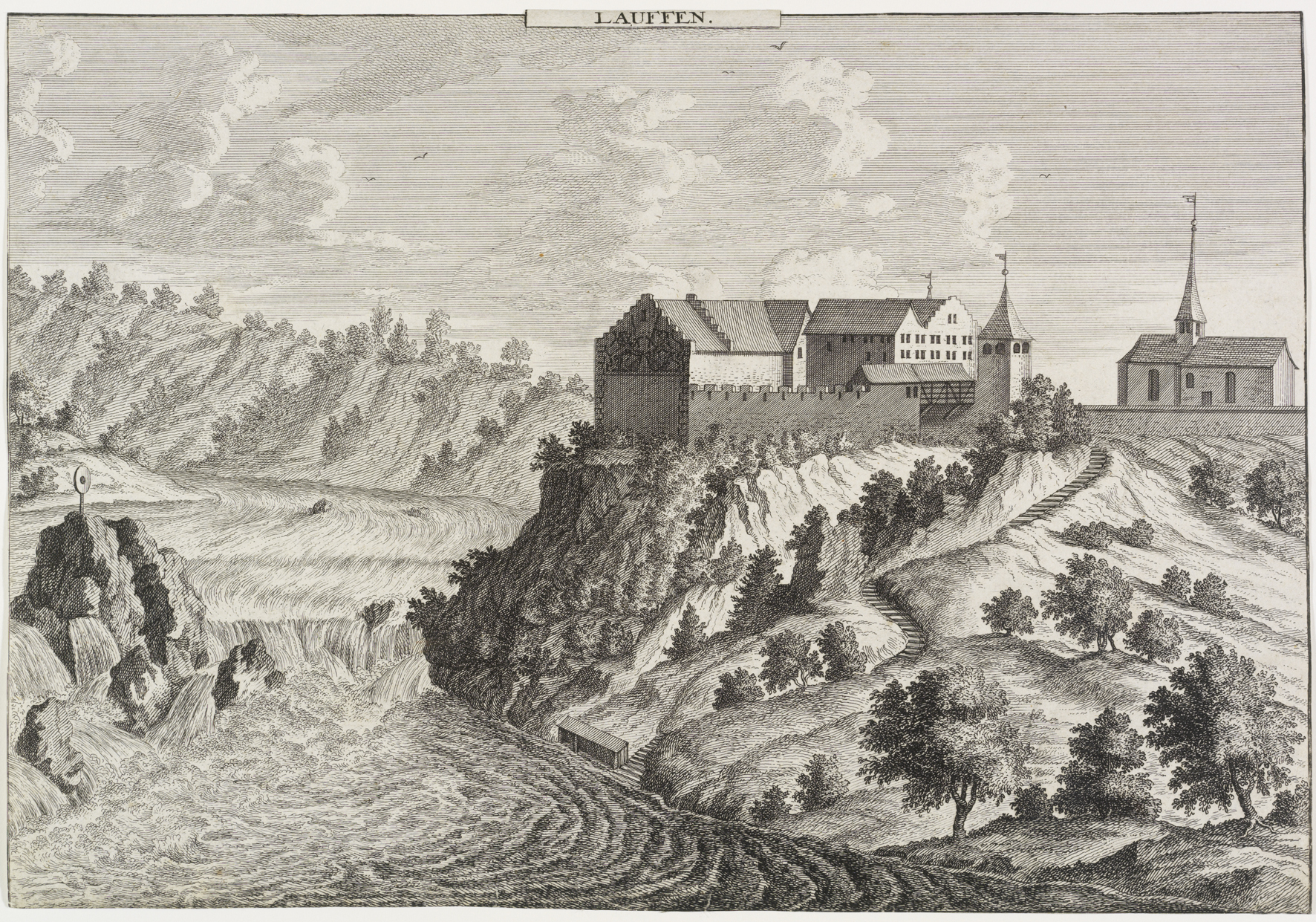
Engraving of Laufen Castle and the Rhine Falls, 1750

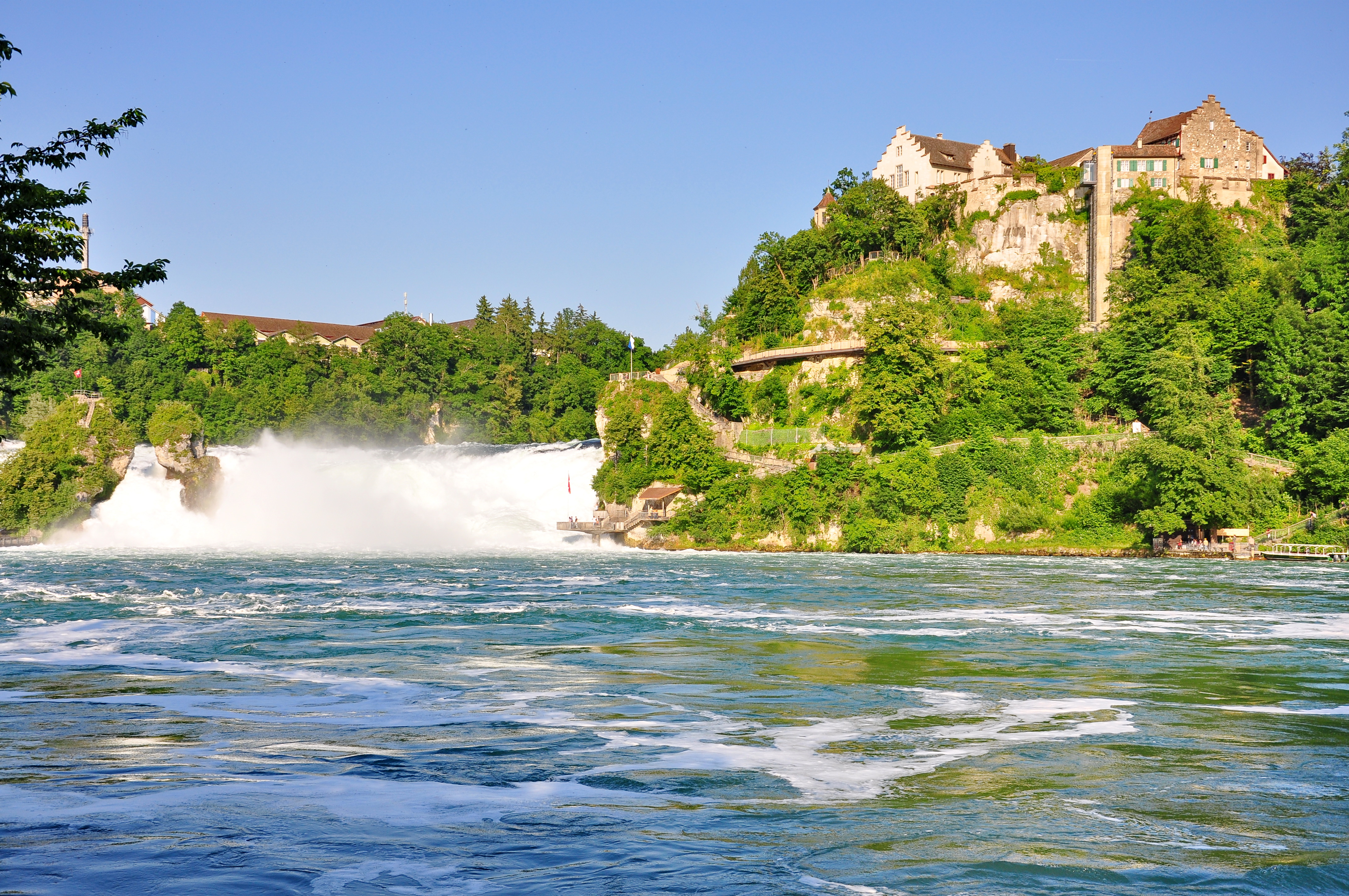
View of Laufen Castle with the Rhine Falls, 2010

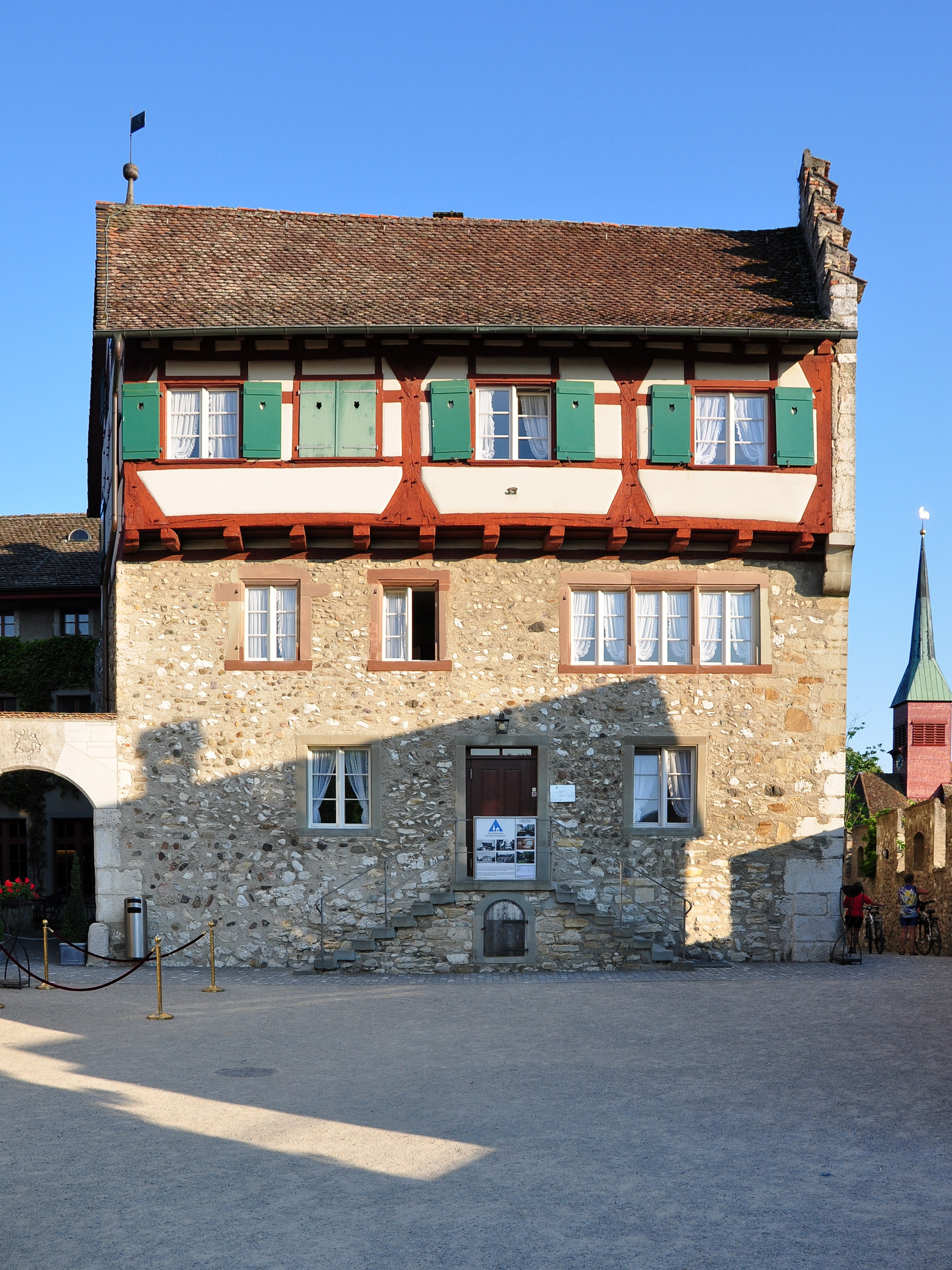
Castle courtyard, 2010

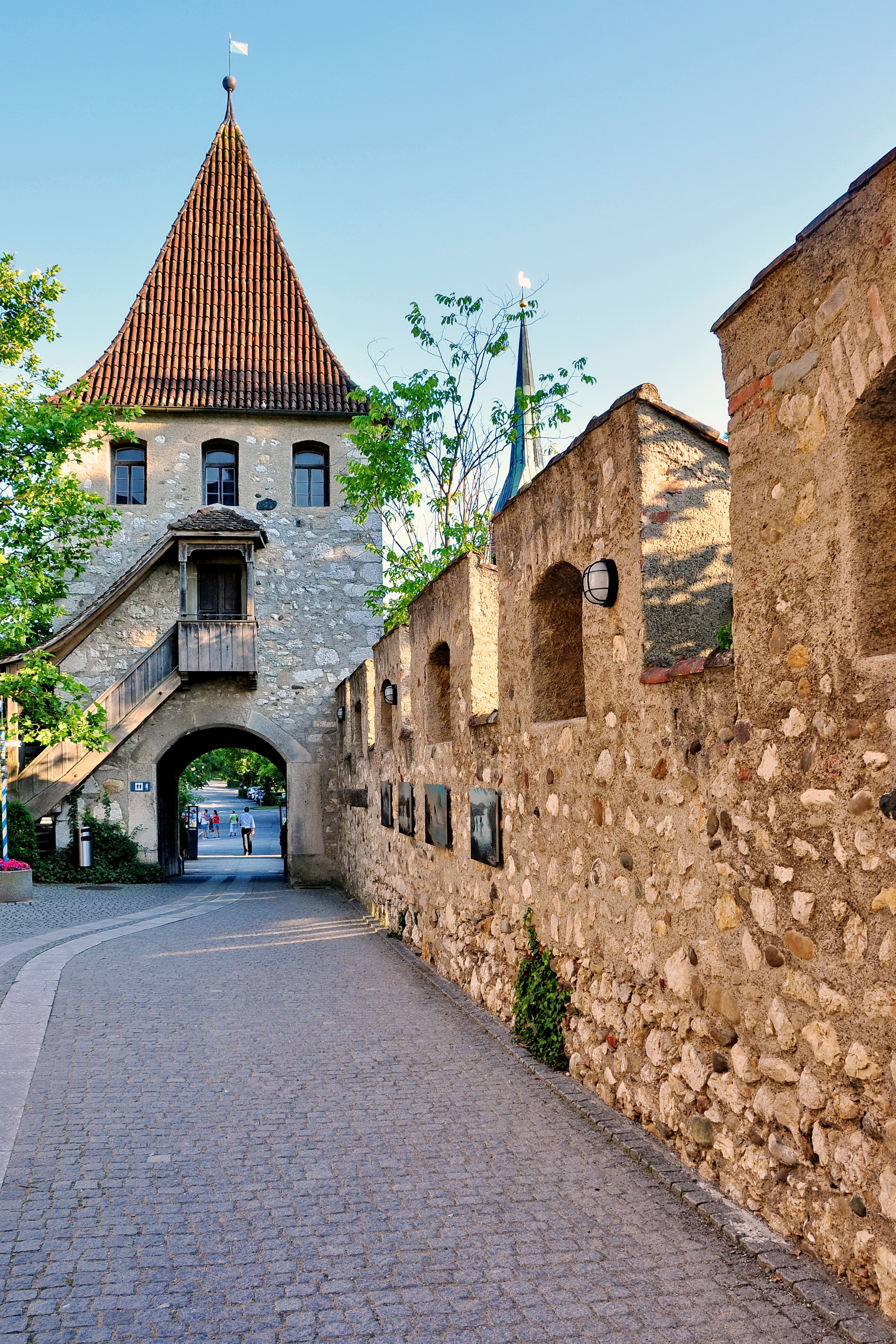
Castle wall and gateway, 2011

== See also ==
- List of castles in Switzerland
- List of cultural property of national significance in Switzerland: Zürich
- Tourism in Switzerland
