= Henggart railway station =

Railway station in Canton of Zürich, Switzerland

Henggart
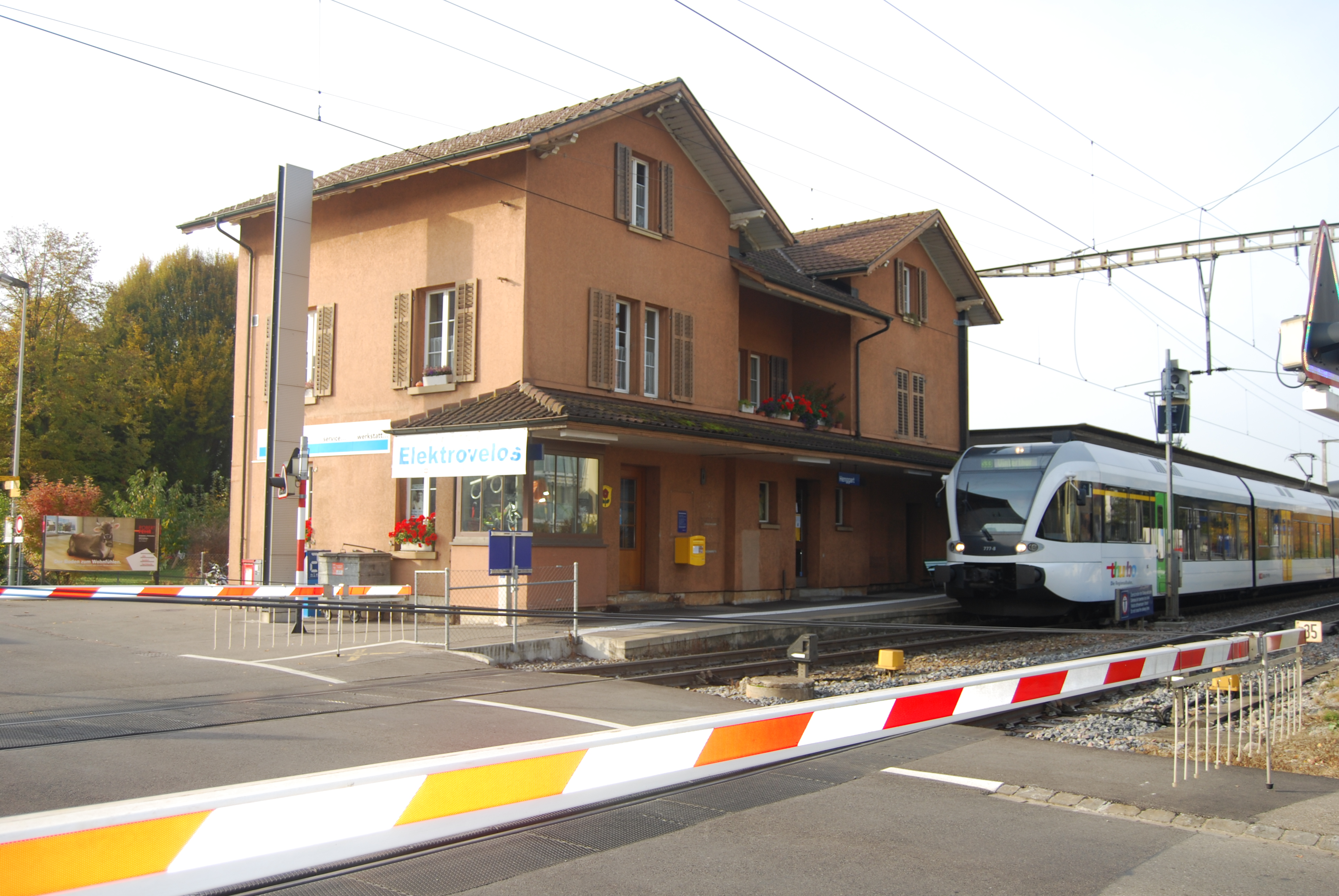

General information
- Location: Oberwilerstrasse; Henggart, Zurich; Switzerland
- Coordinates: 47.564542°N 8.685068°E
- Elevation: 434 m (1,424 ft)
- Owner: Swiss Federal Railways
- Operator: Swiss Federal Railways
- Line: Rheinfall line
- Platforms: 2 side platforms
- Tracks: 2
- Connections: Zurich Transport Network (ZVV)
- Bus: PostAuto lines 675 676

Other information
- Fare zone: 160 (ZVV)

Services
Preceding station	Zurich S-Bahn	Following station
Hettlingen towards Brugg AG	S12	Andelfingen towards Schaffhausen
Hettlingen towards Winterthur	S33	Andelfingen towards Schaffhausen
Hettlingen towards Winterthur	SN3 Limited service	Andelfingen towards Stein am Rhein
Location
- Location within Switzerland Location within Canton of Zurich

Henggart is a railway station in the municipality of Henggart in the canton of Zurich, Switzerland. It is located on the Rheinfall line, within fare zone 160 of the Zürcher Verkehrsverbund (ZVV).

== Services ==
The railway station is served by Zurich S-Bahn lines S12 and S33, which operate hourly (combined half-hourly service in each direction). The S24 service does not call at the station.

- Zurich S-Bahn lines S12 / S33: combined half-hourly service to Schaffhausen and Winterthur, hourly service to/from Brugg AG (via Zürich HB).

During weekends, there is also a Nighttime S-Bahn service (SN3) offered by ZVV.

- SN3: hourly service to Winterthur and Stein am Rhein via Schaffhausen.

The station is additionally served by PostAuto buses.

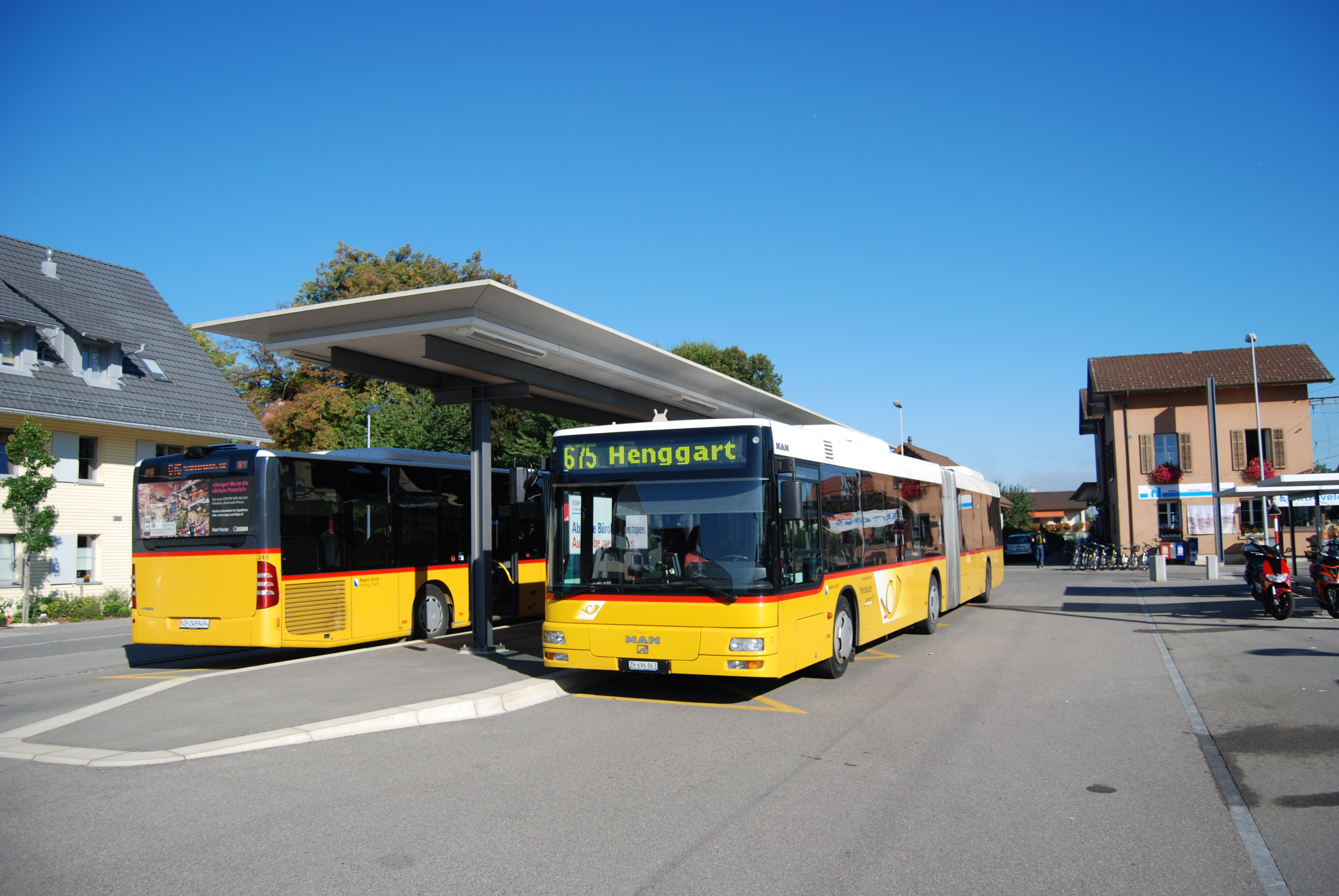
Bus interchange at the station

== See also ==
- Rail transport in Switzerland
