= Holzbach (Soppenbach) =

River in Germany

Location
- Country: Germany
- States: Baden-Württemberg

Physical characteristics
- Mouth
  - location: Soppenbach
  - coordinates: 48.1456°N 9.4049°E

Basin features
- Progression: Soppenbach→ Biberbach→ Danube→ Black Sea

Holzbach (German pronunciation: [ˈhɔlt͡sˌbax]) is a river of Baden-Württemberg, Germany. The river is a left tributary of the Soppenbach (a tributary of the Biberbach) in Andelfingen.

== See also ==
- List of rivers of Baden-Württemberg
