= Dachsen railway station =

Railway station in Dachsen, Switzerland

Dachsen
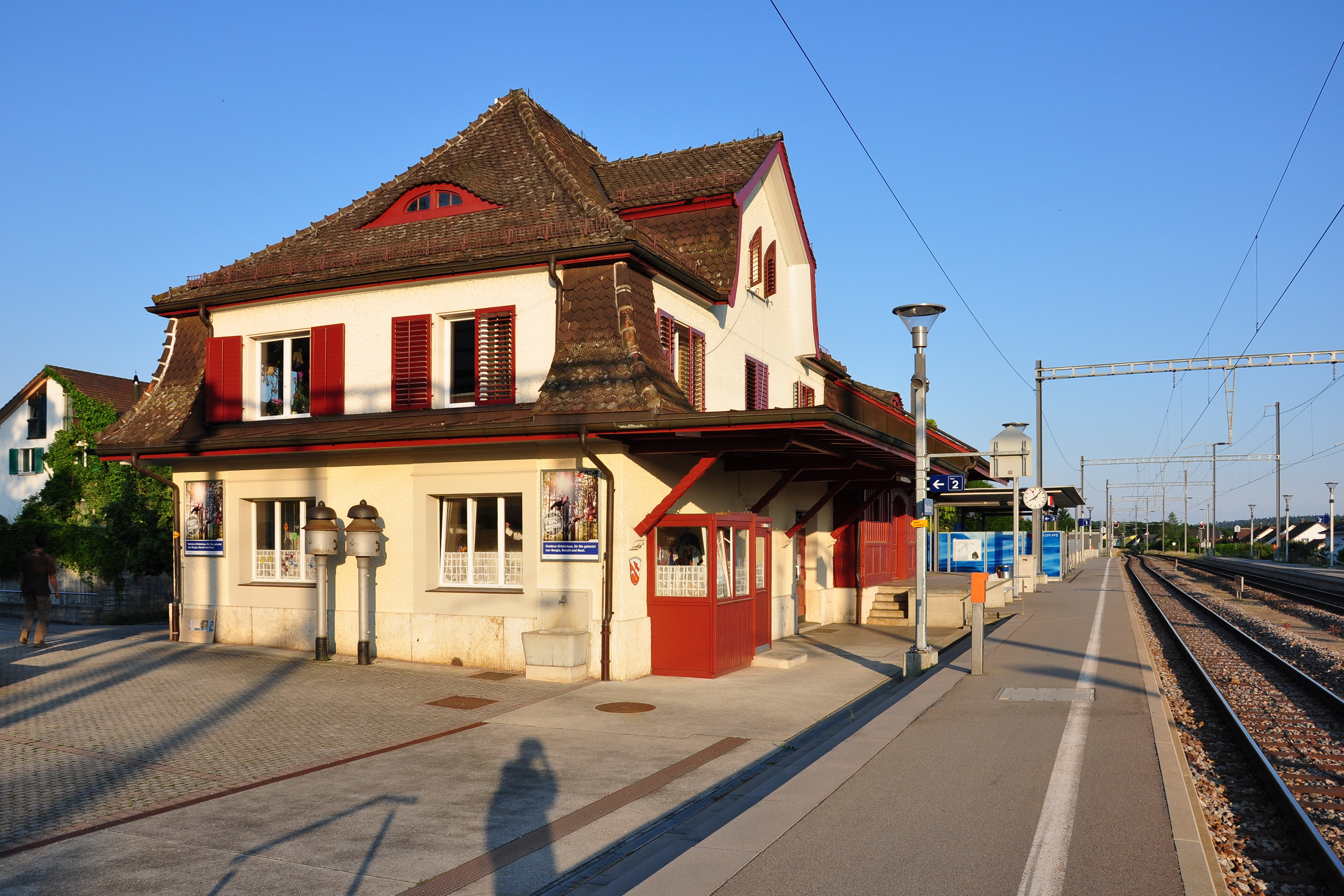
- The station in 2010

General information
- Location: Bahnhofstrasse; Dachsen, Canton of Zurich; Switzerland
- Coordinates: 47.666341°N 8.614333°E
- Elevation: 394 m (1,293 ft)
- Owner: Swiss Federal Railways
- Line: Rheinfall line
- Platforms: 2 side platforms
- Tracks: 2
- Connections: PostAuto line 634

Other information
- Fare zone: 116 (ZVV); 821 (Ostwind Fare Network)

Services
Preceding station	Zurich S-Bahn	Following station
Marthalen towards Brugg AG	S12	Schloss Laufen am Rheinfall towards Schaffhausen
Marthalen towards Winterthur	S33	Schloss Laufen am Rheinfall towards Schaffhausen
Marthalen towards Winterthur	SN3 Limited service	Schloss Laufen am Rheinfall towards Stein am Rhein
Location
- Location within Switzerland Location within Canton of Zurich

Dachsen is a railway station in the municipality of Dachsen in the canton of Zurich, Switzerland. It is located on the Rheinfall line, within both fare zone 116 of the Zürcher Verkehrsverbund (ZVV) and fare zone 821 of the Ostwind Fare Network.

== Services ==
The railway station is served by Zurich S-Bahn lines S12 and S33, which operate hourly (combined half-hourly service in each direction). The S24 service does not call at the station.

- Zurich S-Bahn lines S12 / S33: half-hourly service to Schaffhausen and Winterthur, hourly service to/from Brugg AG (via Zürich HB).

During weekends, there is also a Nighttime S-Bahn service (SN3) offered by ZVV.

- SN3: hourly service to Winterthur and Stein am Rhein via Schaffhausen.

== See also ==
- Rail transport in Switzerland
