= Marthalen railway station =

Railway station in Canton of Zürich, Switzerland

Marthalen
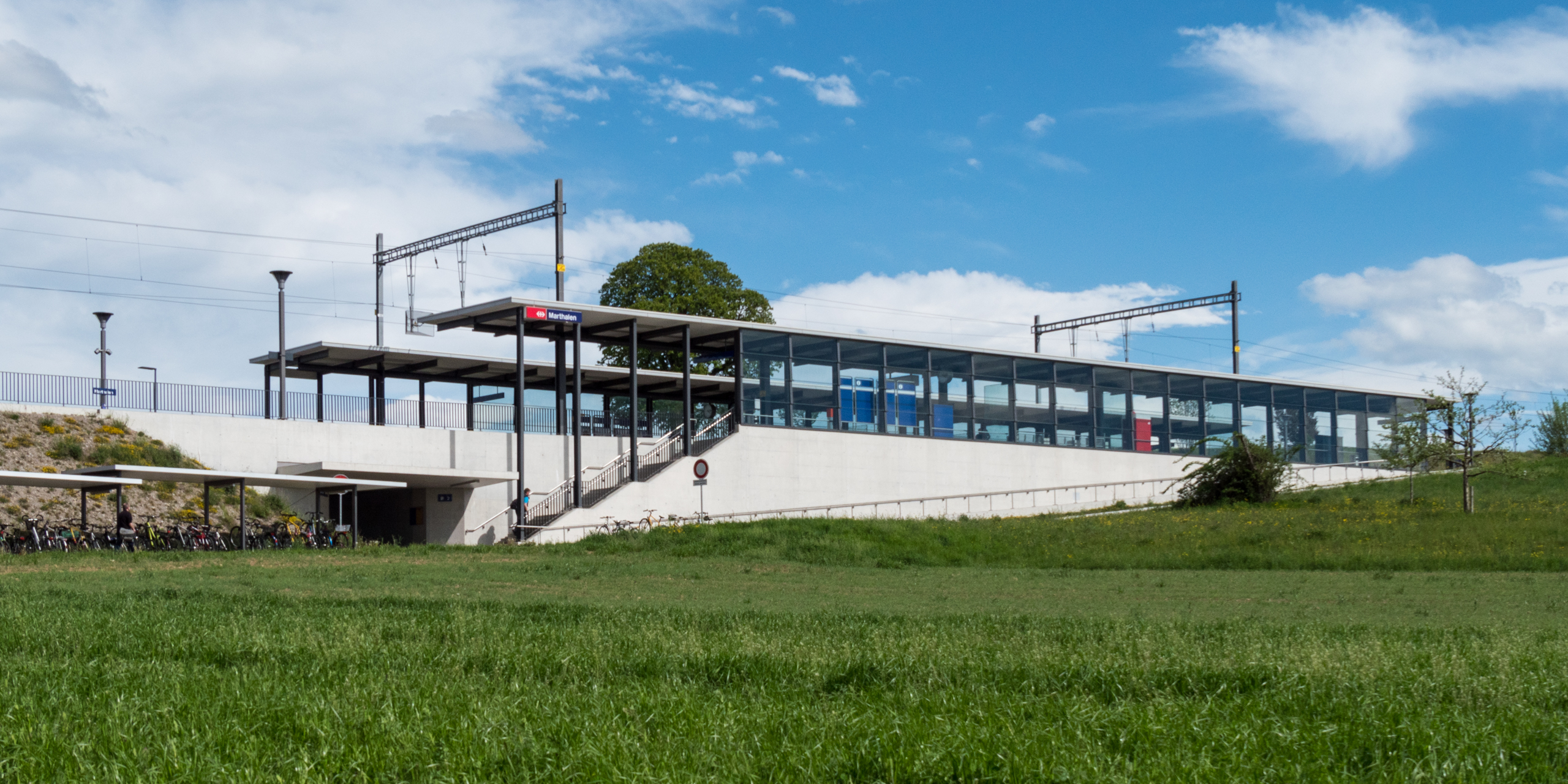
- The station in 2019

General information
- Location: Ruedelfingerstrass; Marthalen, Canton of Zurich; Switzerland
- Coordinates: 47.634735°N 8.652838°E
- Elevation: 412 m (1,352 ft)
- Owner: Swiss Federal Railways
- Line: Rheinfall line
- Platforms: 2 side platforms
- Tracks: 2
- Connections: Zurich Transport Network (ZVV)
- Bus: PostAuto lines 620 621 623

Other information
- Fare zone: 115 (ZVV)

Services
Preceding station	Zurich S-Bahn	Following station
Andelfingen towards Brugg AG	S12	Dachsen towards Schaffhausen
Andelfingen towards Winterthur	S33	Dachsen towards Schaffhausen
Andelfingen towards Winterthur	SN3 Limited service	Dachsen towards Stein am Rhein
Location
- Location within Switzerland Location within Canton of Zurich

Marthalen is a railway station in the municipality of Marthalen in the canton of Zurich, Switzerland. It is located on the Rheinfall line, within fare zone 115 of the Zürcher Verkehrsverbund (ZVV). The station was moved to its current location in 2014.

== Services ==
The railway station is served by Zurich S-Bahn lines S12 and S33, which operate hourly (combined half-hourly service in each direction). The S24 service does not call at the station.

- Zurich S-Bahn lines S12 / S33: half-hourly service to Schaffhausen and Winterthur, hourly service to/from Brugg AG (via Zürich HB).

During weekends, there is also a Nighttime S-Bahn service (SN3) offered by ZVV.

- SN3: hourly service to Winterthur and Stein am Rhein via Schaffhausen.

The station is additionally served by PostAuto buses.

== History ==
The current station opened in 2014 and replaced the former railway station, which was located ca 350 m (1,150 ft) further north.

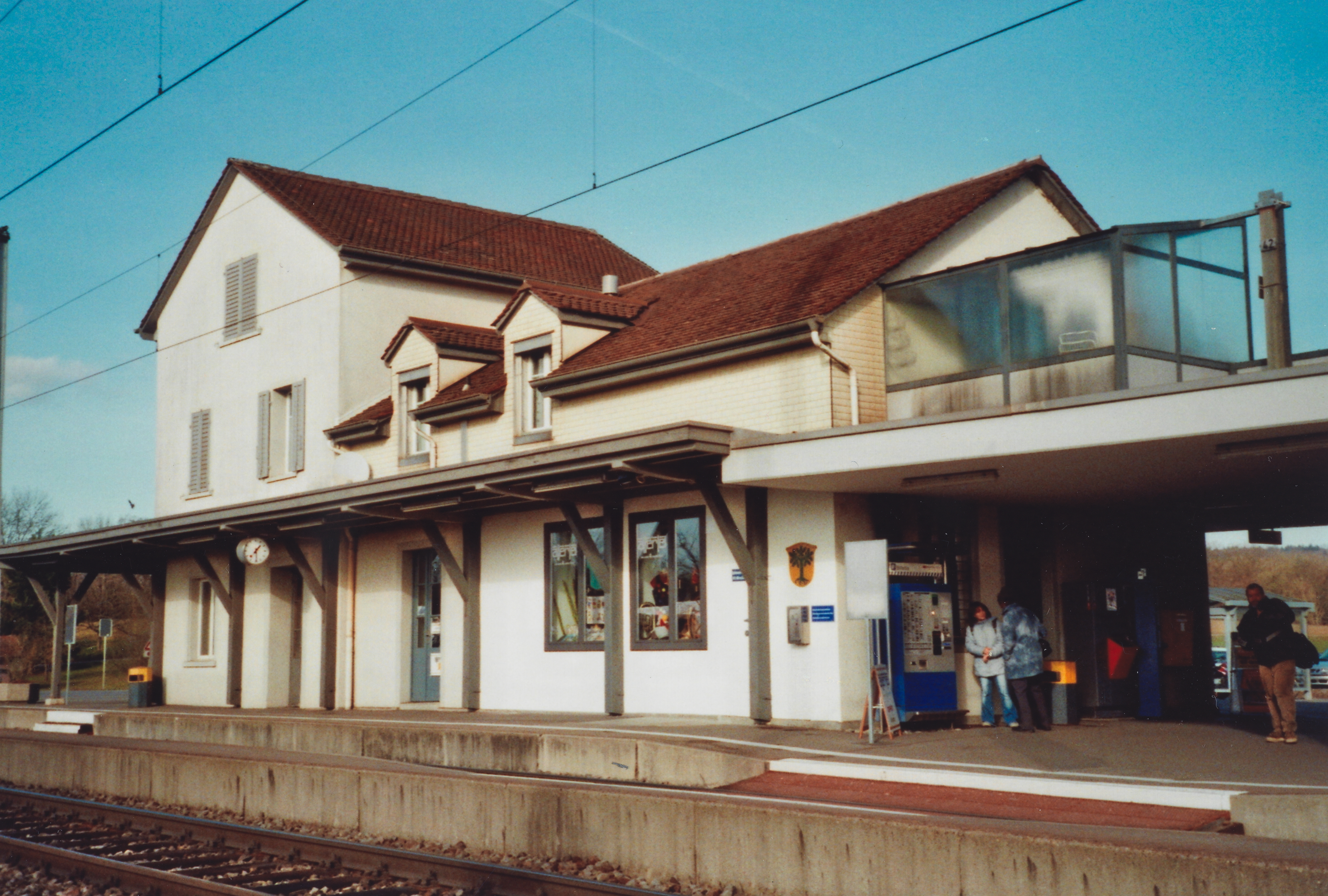
The former railway station in 2008

== See also ==
- Rail transport in Switzerland
