= Andelfingen =

Andelfingen may refer to:

- Andelfingen, Germany, a village in Biberach district
- Andelfingen District, Canton of Zürich, Switzerland
  - Andelfingen, Switzerland, a municipality in the district
    - Andelfingen railway station
