= Hettlingen railway station =

Railway station in Hettlingen, Switzerland

Hettlingen
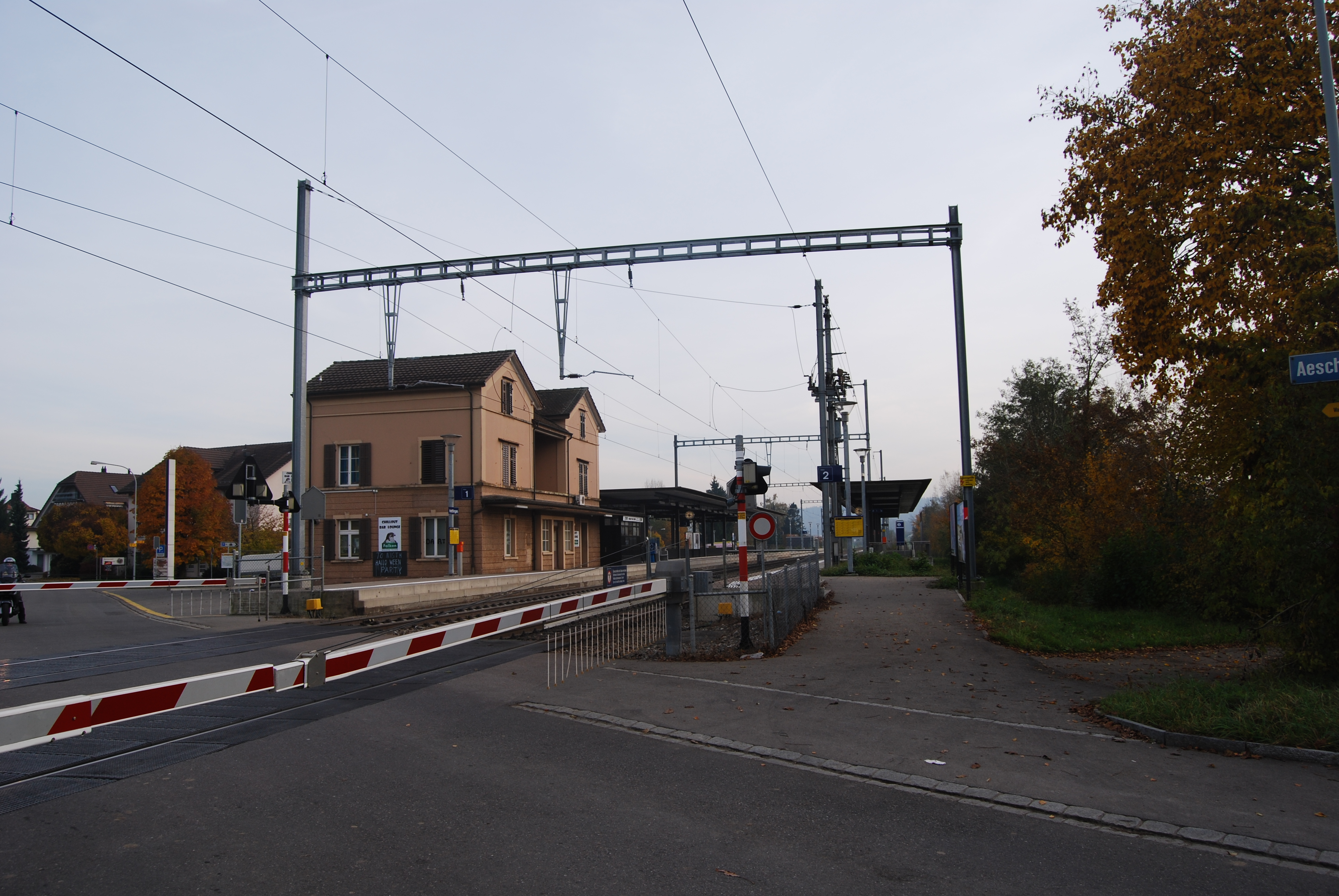

General information
- Location: Stationstrasse, Hettlingen, Canton of Zurich, Switzerland
- Coordinates: 47.545189°N 8.694783°E
- Elevation: 425 m (1,394 ft)
- Owner: Swiss Federal Railways
- Operator: Swiss Federal Railways
- Line: Rheinfall line
- Platforms: 2 side platforms
- Tracks: 2
- Connections: Zurich Transport Network (ZVV)
- Bus: PostAuto lines 671 677

Other information
- Fare zone: 160 (ZVV)

Services
Preceding station	Zurich S-Bahn	Following station
Winterthur towards Brugg AG	S12	Henggart towards Schaffhausen
Winterthur Terminus	S33	Henggart towards Schaffhausen
Winterthur Terminus	SN3 Limited service	Henggart towards Stein am Rhein
Location
- Location within Switzerland Location within Canton of Zurich

Hettlingen is a railway station in the municipality of Hettlingen in the canton of Zurich, Switzerland. It is located on the Rheinfall line, within fare zone 160 of the Zürcher Verkehrsverbund (ZVV).

== Services ==
The railway station is served by Zurich S-Bahn lines S12 and S33, which operate hourly (combined half-hourly service in each direction). The S24 service does not call at the station. In summary:

- Zurich S-Bahn lines S12 / S33: combined half-hourly service to Schaffhausen and Winterthur, hourly service to/from Brugg AG (via Zürich HB).

During weekends, there is also a Nighttime S-Bahn service (SN3) offered by ZVV.

- SN3: hourly service to Winterthur and Stein am Rhein via Schaffhausen.

The station is additionally served by PostAuto buses.

== See also ==
- Rail transport in Switzerland
