= Andelfingen railway station =

Railway station in Andelfingen, Switzerland

Andelfingen
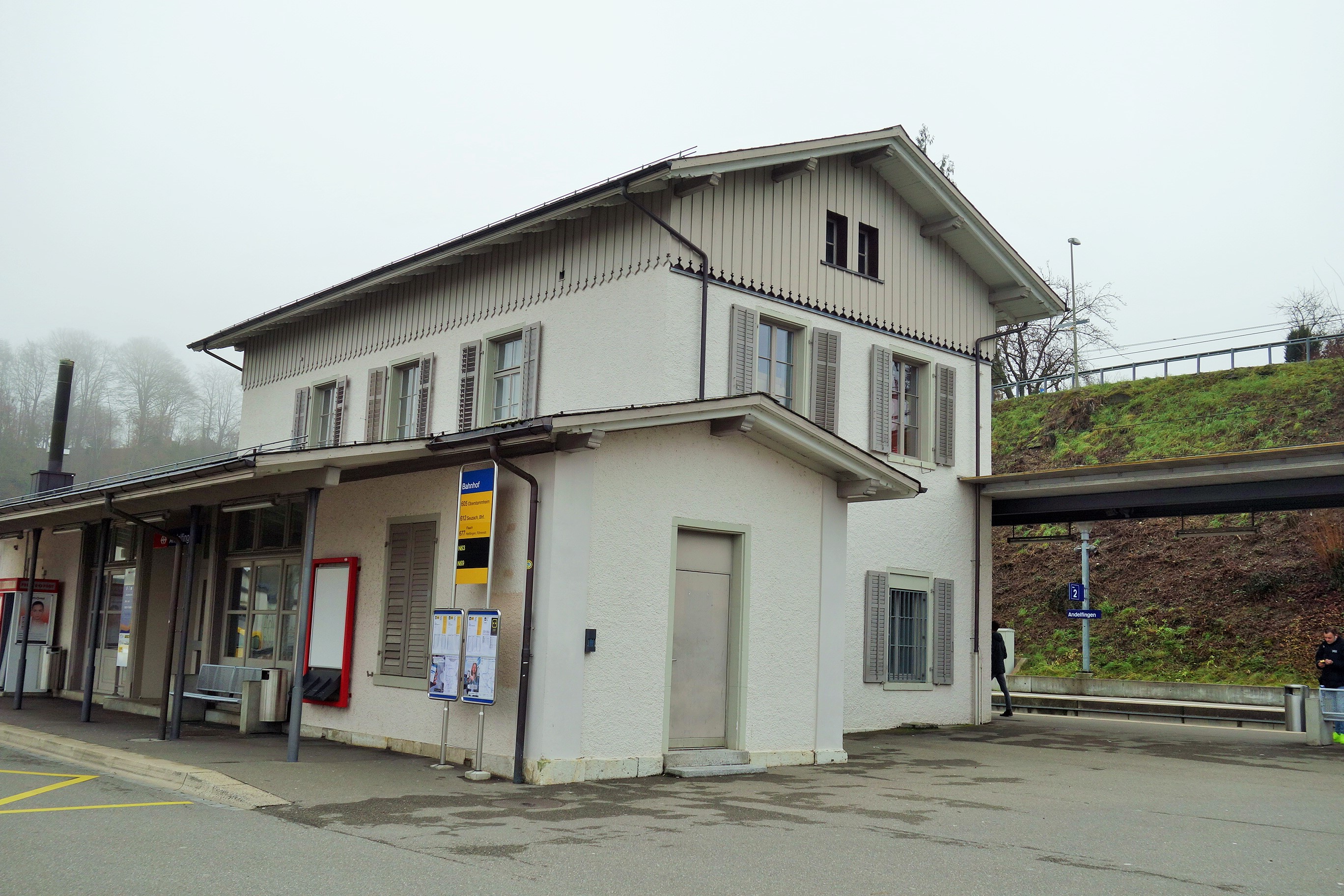
- Station building of 1870

General information
- Location: Humlikonerstrasse; Andelfingen, Canton of Zurich; Switzerland
- Coordinates: 47.593723°N 8.67789°E
- Elevation: 402 m (1,319 ft)
- Owner: Swiss Federal Railways
- Operator: Swiss Federal Railways
- Line: Rheinfall line
- Connections: Zurich Transport Network (ZVV)
- Bus: PostAuto lines 605 612 677

Other information
- Fare zone: 161 (ZVV)

Services
Preceding station	Zurich S-Bahn	Following station
Henggart towards Brugg AG	S12	Marthalen towards Schaffhausen
Winterthur towards Zug	S24	Neuhausen towards Thayngen
Henggart towards Winterthur	S33	Marthalen towards Schaffhausen
Henggart towards Winterthur	SN3 Limited service	Marthalen towards Stein am Rhein
Location
- Location within Switzerland Location within Canton of Zurich

Andelfingen is a railway station in the municipality of Andelfingen in the canton of Zurich, Switzerland. It is located on the Rheinfall line, within fare zone 161 of the Zürcher Verkehrsverbund (ZVV).

== Services ==
The railway station is served by Zurich S-Bahn lines S12, S24, and S33. In summary:

- Zurich S-Bahn:
  - S12 / S33: combined half-hour service to Schaffhausen and Winterthur, hourly service to/from Brugg AG (via Zürich HB).
  - S24: hourly service to Thayngen and Zug via Zürich HB.

During weekends, there is also a Nighttime S-Bahn service (SN3) offered by ZVV.

- SN3: hourly service to Winterthur and Stein am Rhein via Schaffhausen.

The station is additionally served by PostAuto buses.

== See also ==
- Rail transport in Switzerland
