= Schloss Laufen am Rheinfall railway station =

Railway station in Switzerland

Schloss Laufen am Rheinfall
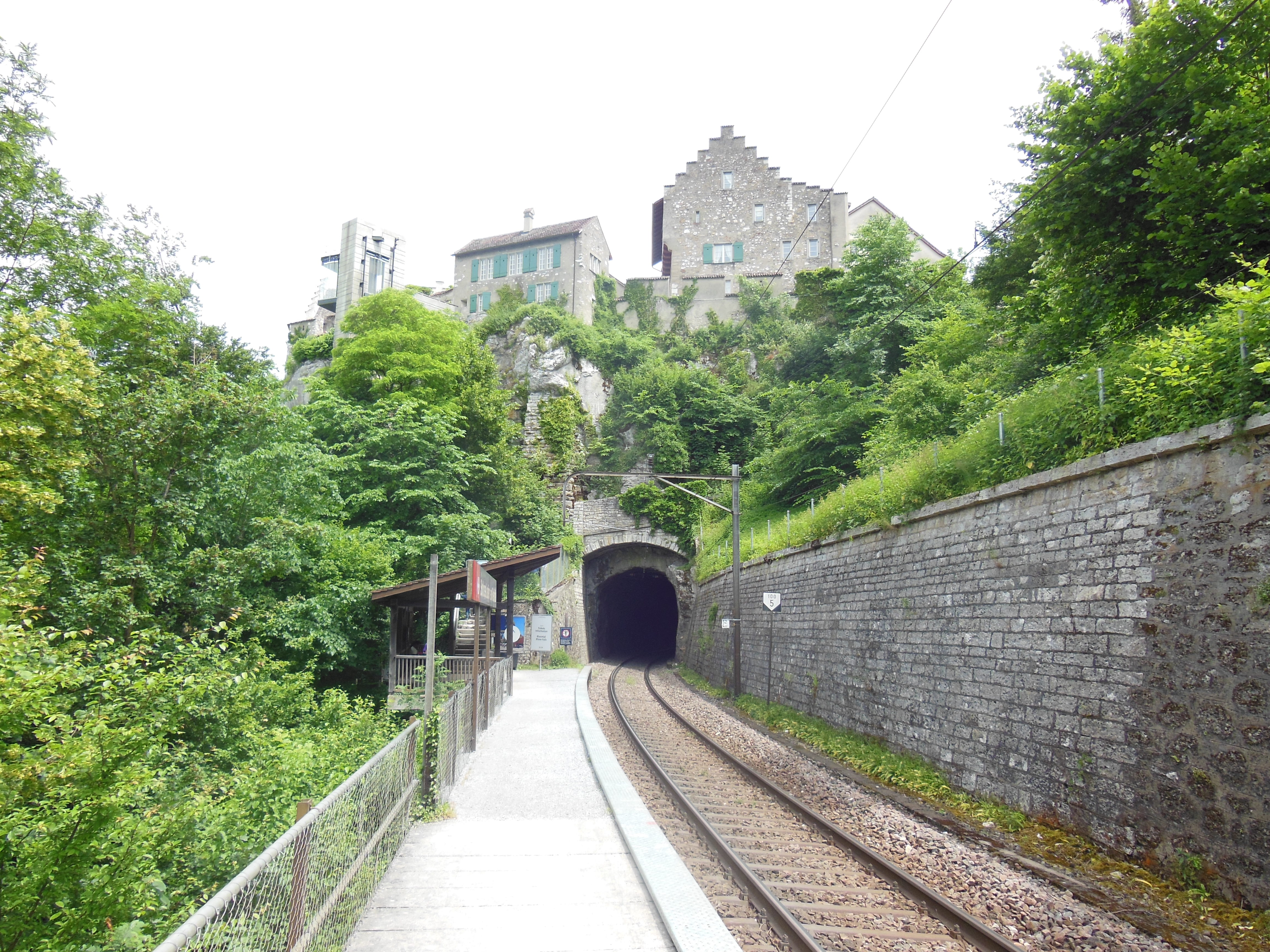
- Station platform in 2012

General information
- Location: Schloss Laufen, Laufen-Uhwiesen, Canton of Zurich; Switzerland
- Coordinates: 47.676427°N 8.613871°E
- Elevation: 389 m (1,276 ft)
- Owner: Swiss Federal Railways
- Line: Rheinfall line
- Platforms: 1 side platform
- Tracks: 1
- Connections: 634 (departing next to the castle)

Other information
- Fare zone: 116 (ZVV); 810 (Ostwind Fare Network)

Services
Preceding station	Zurich S-Bahn	Following station
Dachsen towards Brugg AG	S12	Neuhausen towards Schaffhausen
Dachsen towards Winterthur	S33	Neuhausen towards Schaffhausen
Dachsen towards Winterthur	SN3 Limited service	Neuhausen towards Stein am Rhein
Location
- Location within Switzerland Location within Canton of Zurich

Schloss Laufen am Rheinfall is a railway station in the municipality of Laufen-Uhwiesen in the Swiss canton of Zurich. The station is overlooked by Schloss Laufen (lit. 'Laufen Castle') and in turn overlooks the Rhine Falls (German: Rheinfall), from which it derives its name. It is located on the Swiss Federal Railway's Rheinfall line, within both fare zone 116 of the Zürcher Verkehrsverbund (ZVV) and fare zone 810 of the Ostwind Fare Network.

Schloss Laufen am Rheinfall station is one of two stations intended to serve the Rhine Falls, the other being Neuhausen Rheinfall on the opposite bank of the river.

== Services ==
The railway station is served by Zurich S-Bahn lines S12 and S33, which operate hourly (combined half-hourly service in each direction). The S24 service does not call at the station.

- Zurich S-Bahn lines S12 / S33: half-hourly service to Schaffhausen and Winterthur, hourly service to/from Brugg AG (via Zürich HB).

During weekends, there is also a Nighttime S-Bahn service (SN3) offered by ZVV.

- SN3: hourly service to Winterthur and Stein am Rhein via Schaffhausen.

== Layout ==
The station is situated to the west of Schloss Laufen and its single platform overlooks the Rhine immediately below the falls. Immediately to the east of the station the railway line tunnels under the castle and then crosses the Rhine above the falls on a bridge that also carries pedestrian traffic. The station is linked to the castle by a walkway, and is mostly used by visitors to the castle and falls.

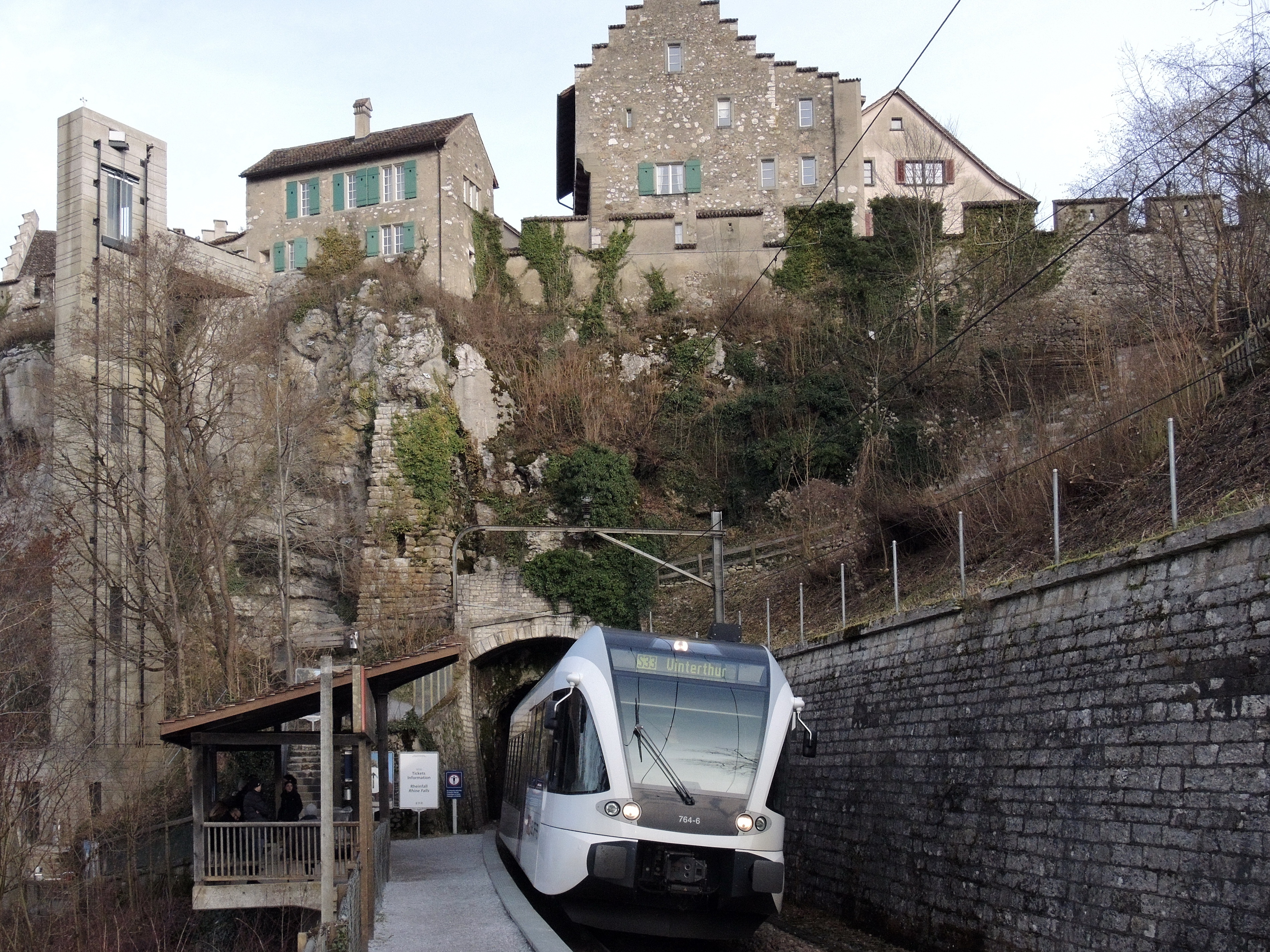
The railway station, train of the S33 line (formerly operated by Thurbo), tunnel and castle seen from the station platform

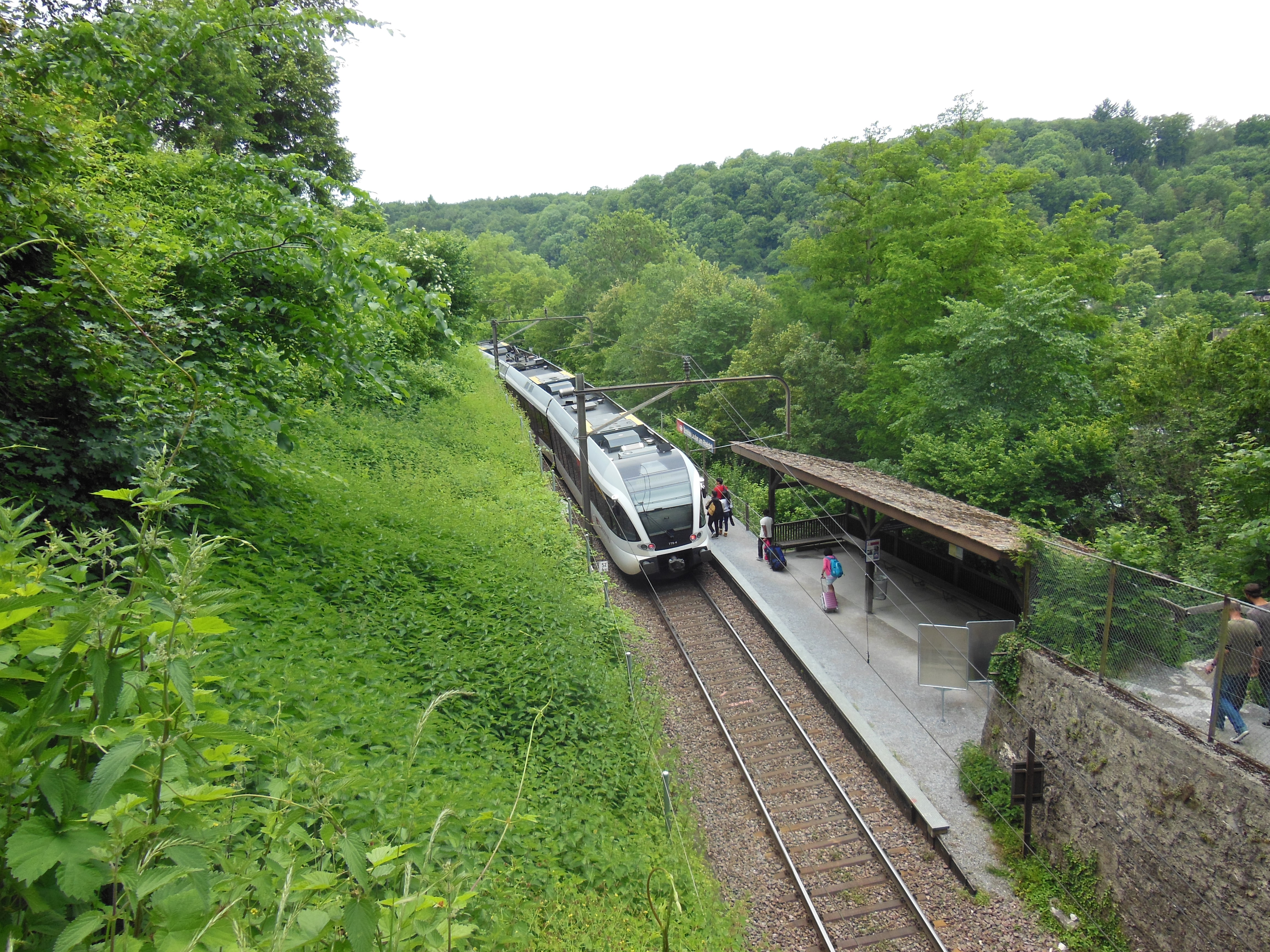
The station seen from the path to the castle, with a Stadler GTW unit on line S33 in the platform

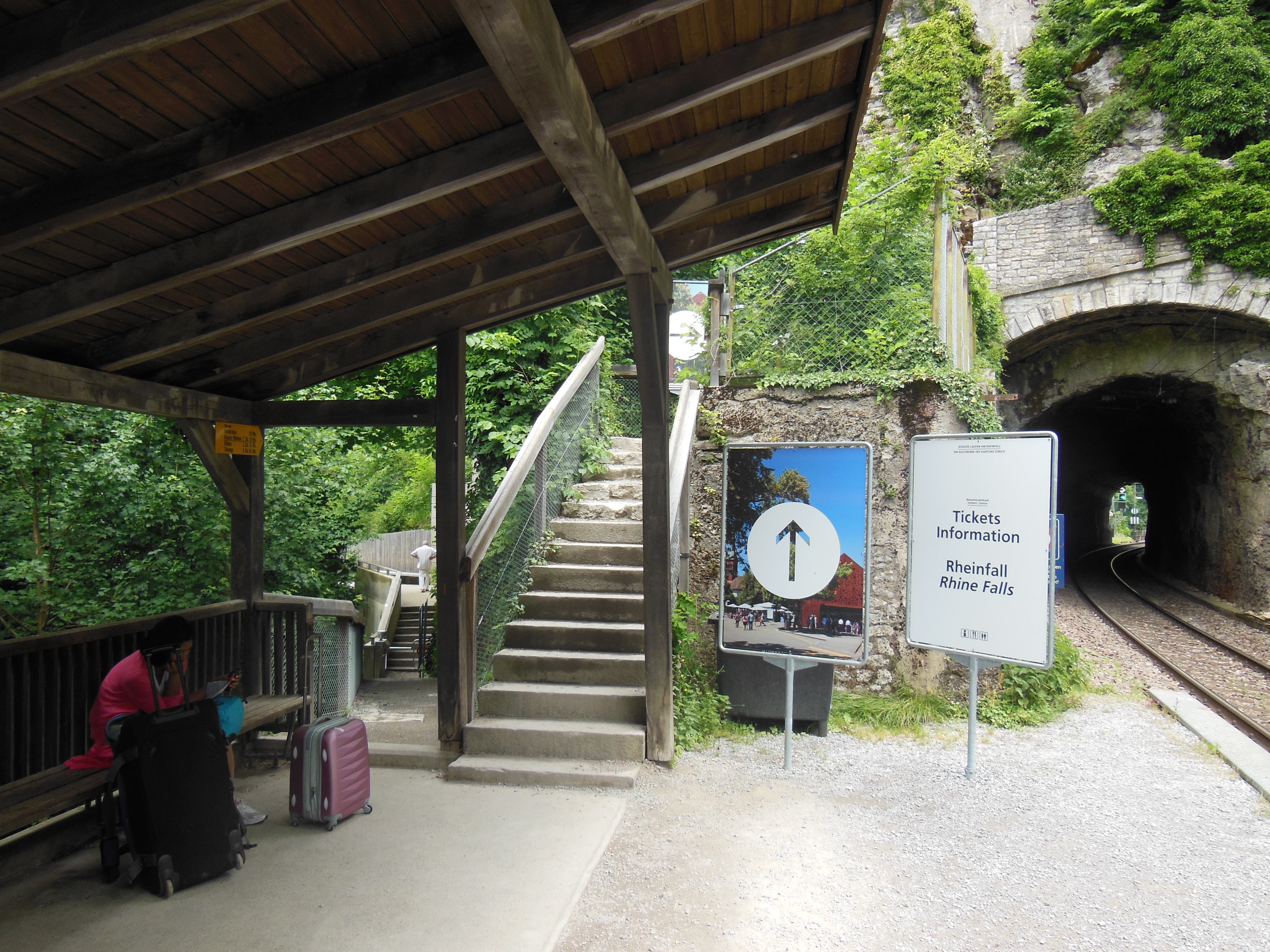
Access to the castle and waterfall from the station platform

== History ==
In 2012, the government of the canton of Zurich proposed that Schloss Laufen am Rheinfall station should be closed from 2015, as it is unable to be adapted for disabled access and is too short to handle the longer trains that are to be introduced then. An alternative of relocating the station onto the nearby Rhine bridge was considered too expensive. The proposal has encountered significant opposition in the cantonal council.

== See also ==
- Rail transport in Switzerland
