= Neuhausen railway station =

Railway station in Schaffhausen, Switzerland

Neuhausen
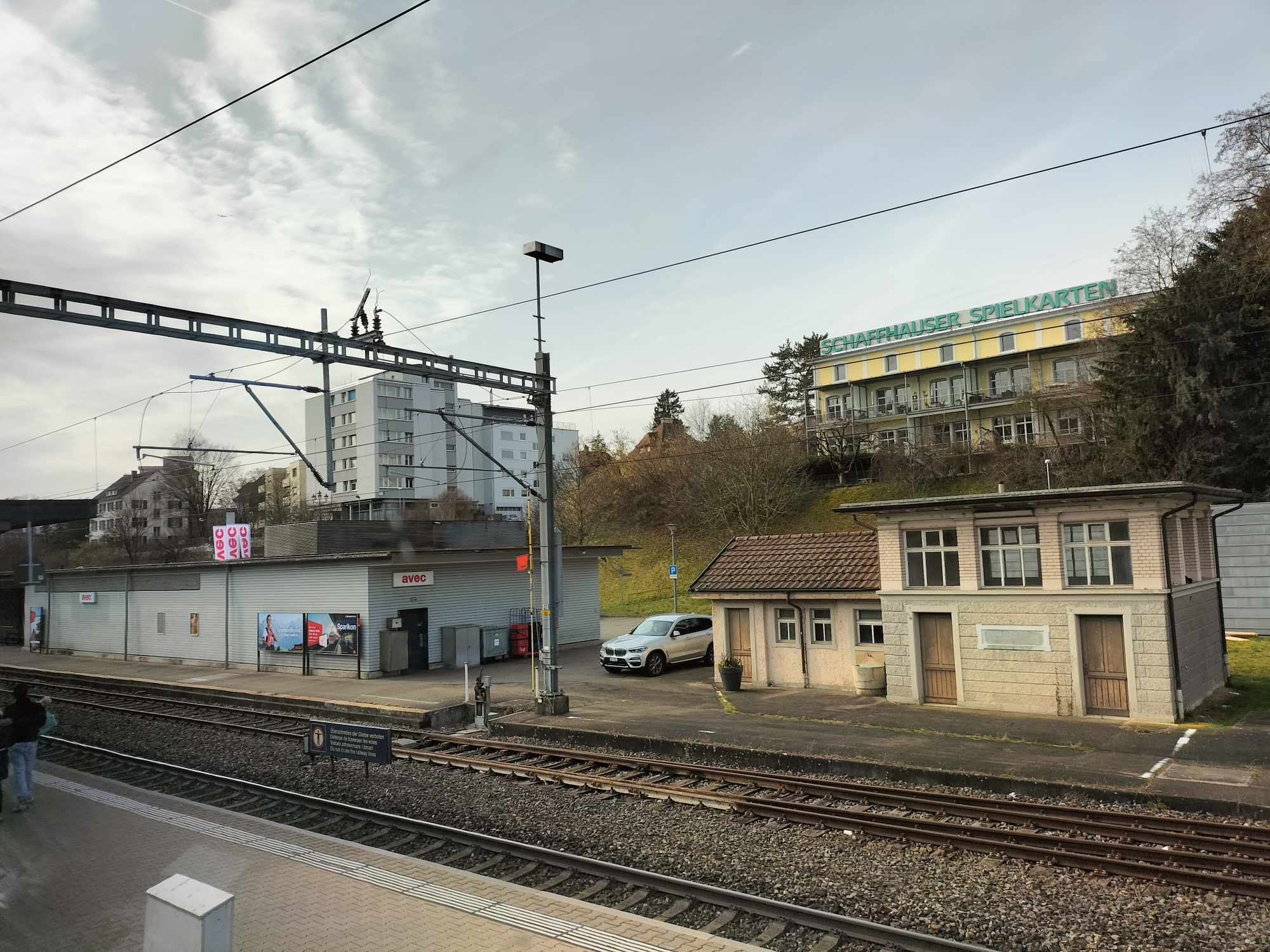
- Station in 2024

General information
- Location: Bahnhofstrasse; Neuhausen am Rheinfall, Schaffhausen; Switzerland
- Coordinates: 47.682899°N 8.625855°E
- Elevation: 397 m (1,302 ft)
- Owner: Swiss Federal Railways
- Operator: Swiss Federal Railways; THURBO
- Lines: Eglisau to Neuhausen line Rheinfall line
- Connections
- Bus: VBSH line 7
- Airport: Direct line to/from Zürich Flughafen with S24 in 0:45h

Other information
- Fare zone: 810 (Tarifverbund Ostwind)

History
- Former names: Neuhausen am Rheinfall (before 2013)

Passengers
- 2018: 1,700 per weekday

Services
Preceding station	Zurich S-Bahn	Following station
Schaffhausen Terminus	S9	Neuhausen Rheinfall towards Uster
Schaffhausen Terminus	S12	Schloss Laufen am Rheinfall towards Brugg AG
Schaffhausen towards Thayngen	S24	Andelfingen towards Zug
Schaffhausen Terminus	S33	Schloss Laufen am Rheinfall towards Winterthur
Schaffhausen towards Stein am Rhein	SN3 Limited service	Schloss Laufen am Rheinfall towards Winterthur
Preceding station	Schaffhausen S-Bahn	Following station
Schaffhausen Terminus	S65	Neuhausen Rheinfall towards Jestetten
Location
- Location within Switzerland Location within Canton of Schaffhausen

Neuhausen (German: Bahnhof Neuhausen) is a railway station served by S-Bahn services in the municipality of Neuhausen am Rheinfall, in the Swiss canton of Schaffhausen.

== Location ==
The railway station is located at the junction of the Rheinfall line and the Eglisau to Neuhausen line, next to the River Rhine at the eastern end of the town of Neuhausen am Rheinfall.

Neuhausen station is one of three stations in Neuhausen, the other two being Neuhausen Badischer Bahnhof and Neuhausen Rheinfall. Neuhausen Badischer Bahnhof lies about 1 kilometre (0.62 mi) to the west, whilst Neuhausen Rheinfall station is 750 metres (2,460 ft) to the south-west.

== Services ==
=== Rail ===
The railway station is served by Zurich S-Bahn lines S9, S12, S24 and S33, and by a Schaffhausen S-Bahn line (operated by Thurbo):

- Zurich S-Bahn:
  - S9: hourly service to Uster (via Neuhausen Rheinfall) and Schaffhausen.
  - S12: hourly service to Brugg AG (via Schloss Laufen am Rheinfall) and Schaffhausen.
  - S24: hourly service to Thayngen (via Schaffhausen) and Zug (via Zürich Airport and Zürich HB).
  - S33: hourly service to Winterthur (via Schloss Laufen am Rheinfall) and Schaffhausen.
- Schaffhausen S-Bahn:
  - S65: hourly service to Jestetten (via Neuhausen Rheinfall) and Schaffhausen.

During weekends, there is also a Nighttime S-Bahn service (SN3) offered by ZVV.

- SN3: hourly service to Winterthur and Stein am Rhein (via Schaffhausen).

=== Bus ===
The railway station is served by municipal bus line 7 of Verkehrsbetriebe Schaffhausen (vbsh). The bus stop next to the railway station is called Neuhausen SBB. It is the southern terminus of line 7.

== Border ==
Until December 2010 the next station in the direction towards Bülach, was Altenburg-Rheinau, located in Altenburg, part of Jestetten, in Germany, close to the border with Switzerland. However, despite protests from the German authorities, the station was closed by the Swiss due to low passenger numbers.

Until the opening of Neuhausen Rheinfall railway station in December 2015, Neuhausen station was a border station for customs purposes. Customs checks could be performed aboard trains and in Neuhausen station by Swiss officials. Systematic passport controls were abolished when Switzerland joined the Schengen Area in 2008.

== Collision ==
Neuhausen station train collision

Details
- Date: 10 January 2013
- Location: Neuhausen am Rheinfall
- Country: Switzerland
- Incident type: Train collision

Statistics
- Trains: 2
- Deaths: 0
- Injured: 17

A train collision occurred on Thursday 10 January 2013, at 8:47 CET on the Winterthur-Schaffhausen line, about 250 meters away from the station. Two trains, the S33 (THURBO) and the former S11 peak-hour service, collided head-on and derailed. There were twenty-six injuries. Nine had to be taken to hospital, but there were no serious injuries. Among the people hospitalised were the two drivers.

== Gallery ==
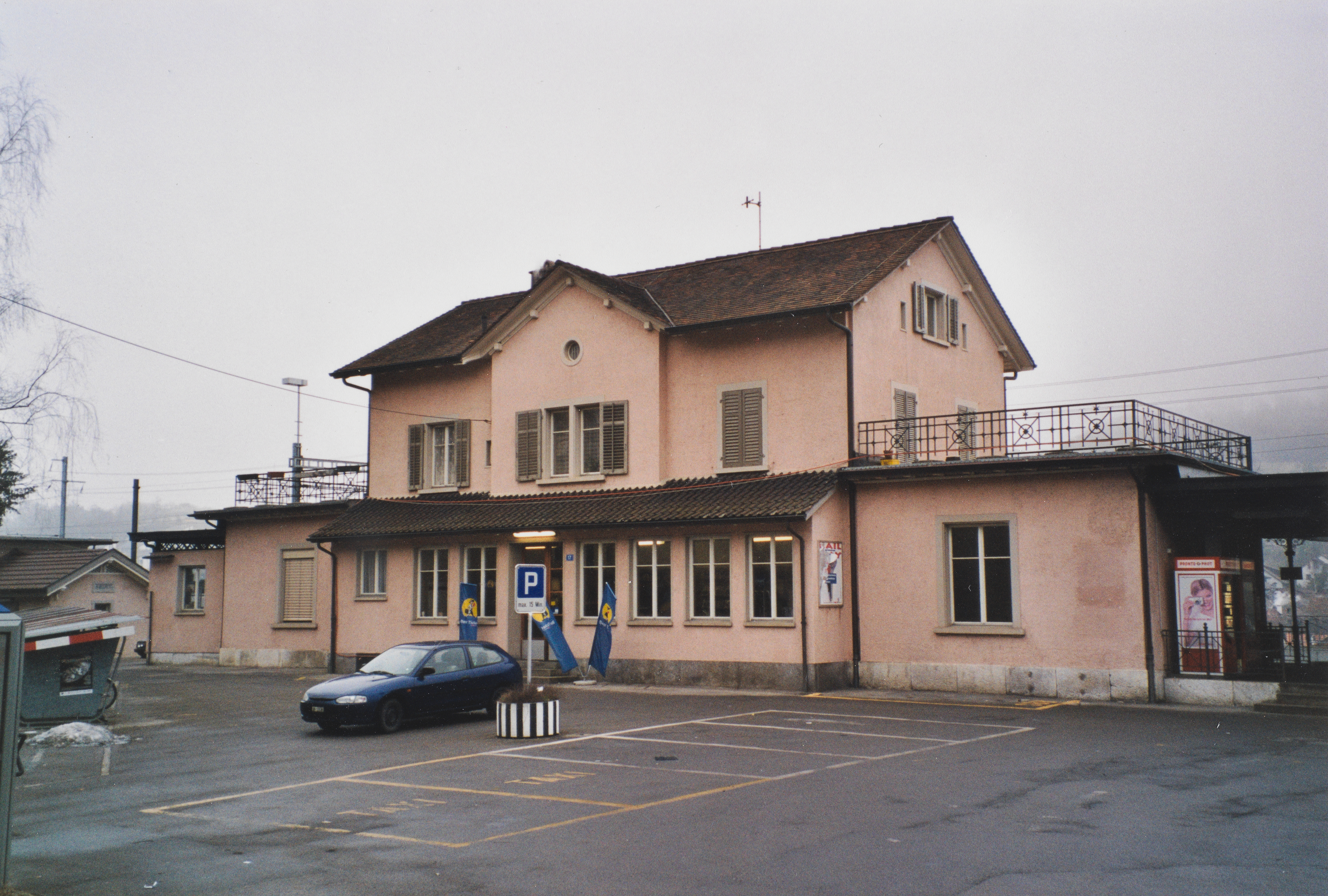
Former station building, west side

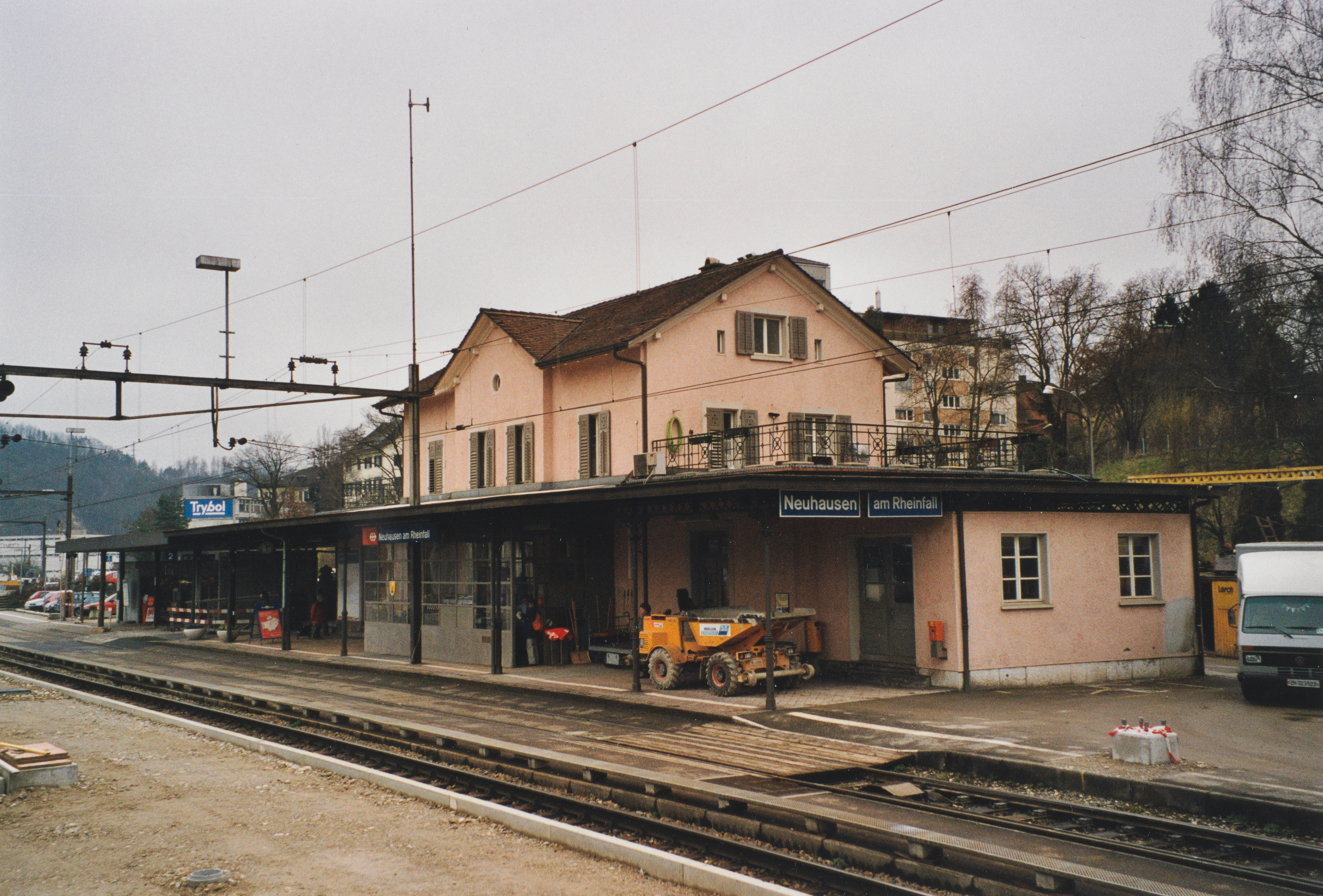
Former station building, east side

== See also ==
- Rail transport in Switzerland
