= S33 (ZVV) =

Railway service in Switzerland

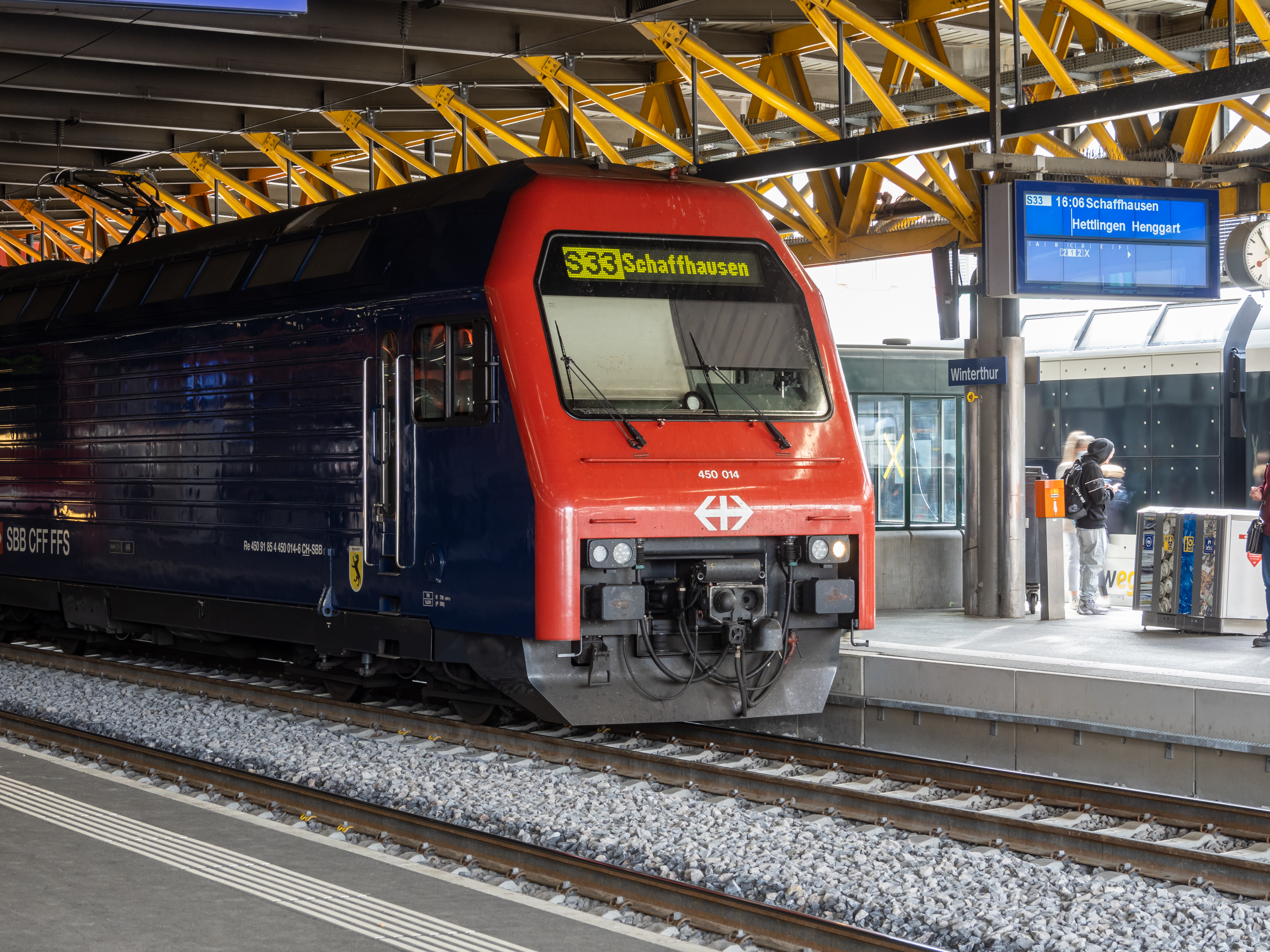
- Train of S33 service at Winterthur railway station.

Overview
- Status: Operational
- Locale: Switzerland
- Termini: Winterthur HB; Schaffhausen
- Stations: 9
- Website: ZVV (in English)

Service
- Type: S-Bahn
- System: Zurich S-Bahn
- Operator(s): Zürcher Verkehrsverbund (ZVV)
- Rolling stock: SBB CFF FFS

Technical
- Track gauge: 1,435 mm (4 ft 8 1/2 in)

Zürich S-Bahn network as of December 2018

The S33 is a regional railway line of the Zurich S-Bahn on the Zürcher Verkehrsverbund (ZVV), Zurich transportation network, and is one of the network's lines connecting the cantons of Zurich and Schaffhausen.

== Route ==
- S33 Winterthur–Andelfingen–Schaffhausen

The line runs from the northwest of the canton of Zurich from Winterthur and heads for Schaffhausen. At both terminal stations, connections to InterCity and InterRegio trains as well as other S-Bahn services exist.

== Stations ==
- Winterthur
- Hettlingen
- Henggart
- Andelfingen
- Marthalen
- Dachsen
- Schloss Laufen am Rheinfall
- Neuhausen
- Schaffhausen

== Rolling stock ==
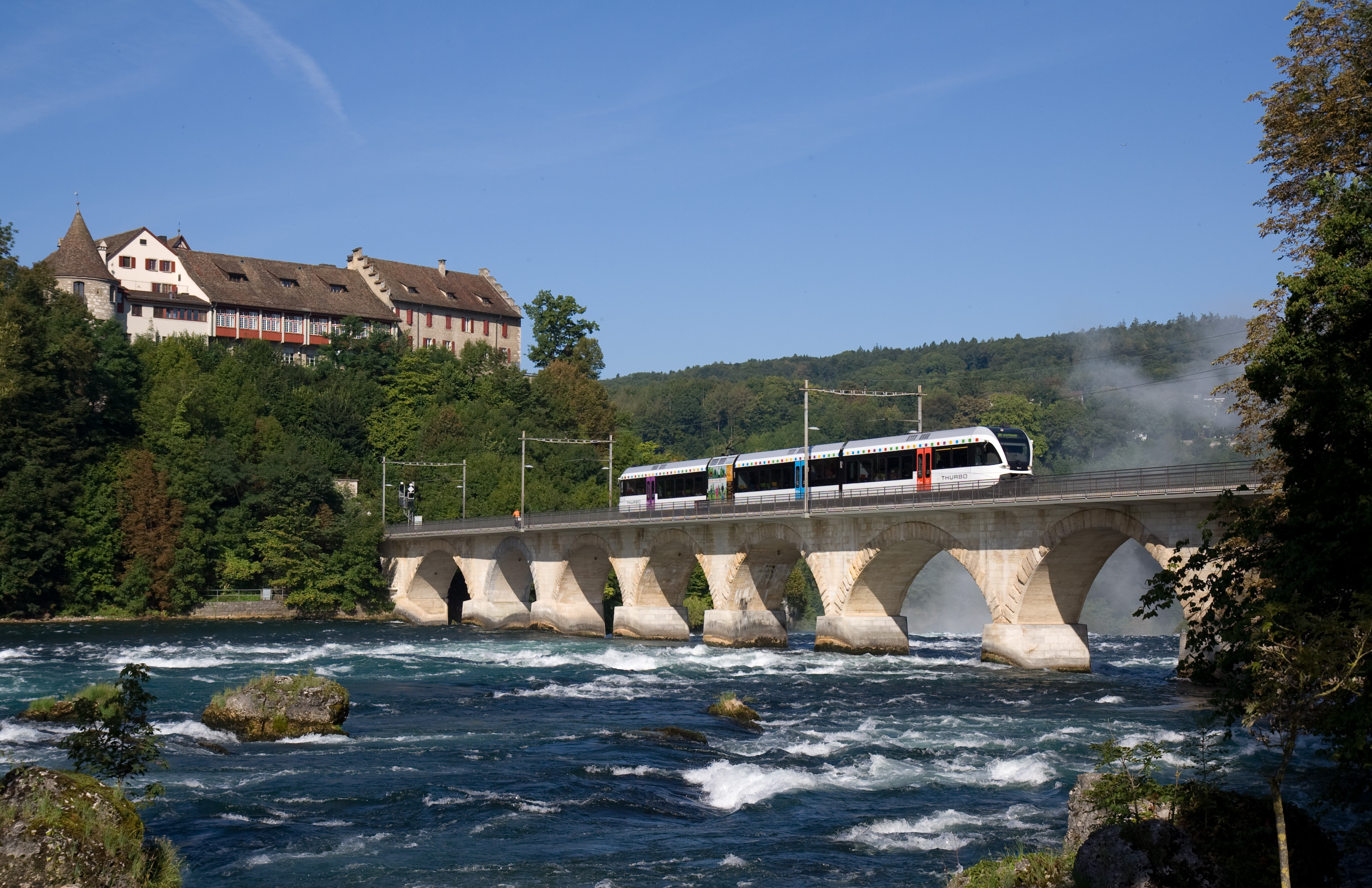
THURBO-operated Stadler GTW unit crossing the bridge near Rheinfall on an S33 service, Laufen Castle in the background.

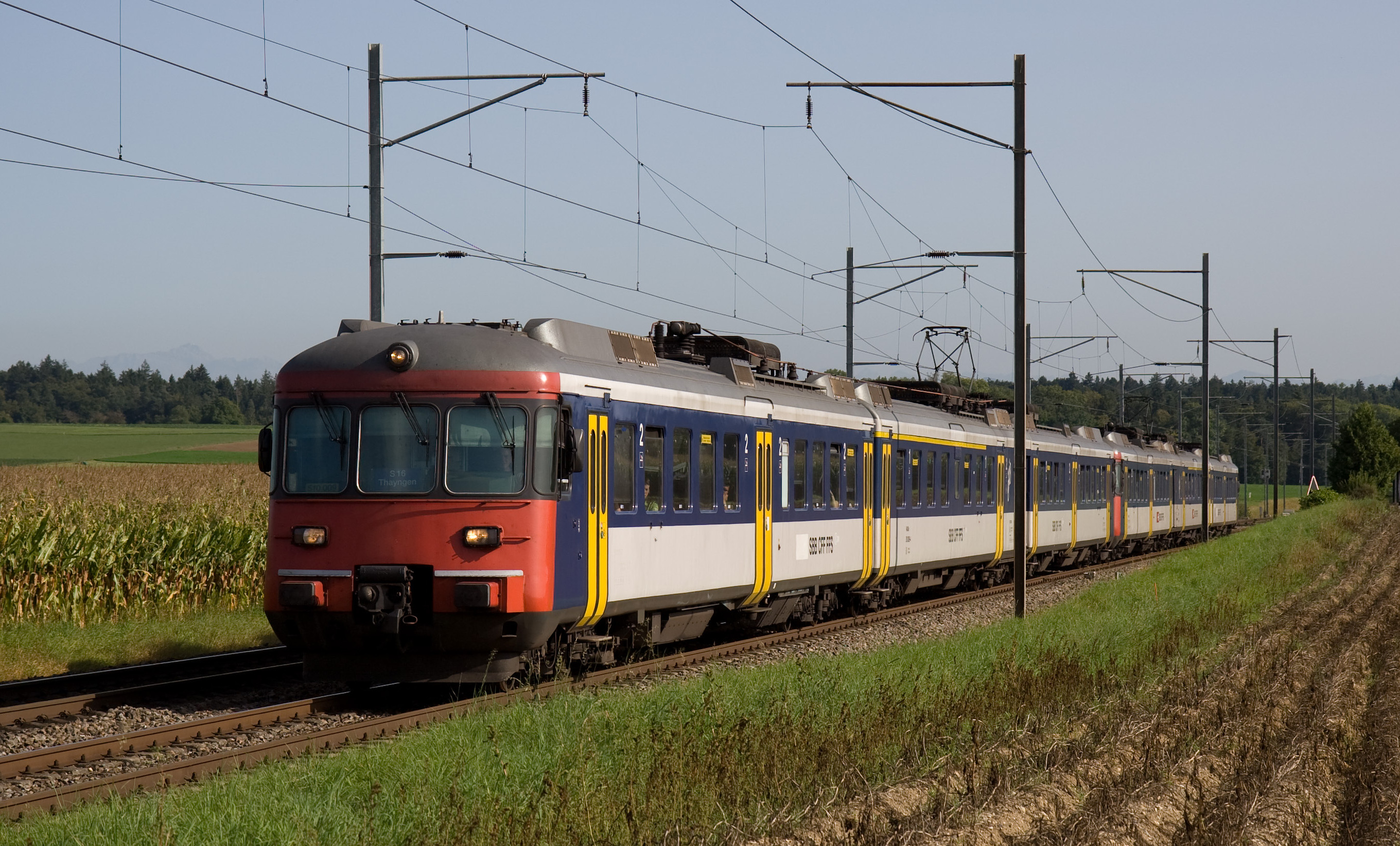
RABDe 510 as S33 between Marthalen and Andelfingen

S33 services are operated by RABe 511 units, except for weekday services to Schaffhausen which are run by Re 450 class locomotives pushing or pulling double-deck passenger carriages.

Between 2010 and 2018, the S33 services were operated by Thurbo rolling stock (Stadler GTW units). Before that, RABDe 510 trainsets operated this line.

== Scheduling ==
The train frequency is usually hourly and the trip takes 33 minutes. The S33 runs hourly, but offers half-hourly services at all stations in combination with the S12 (reduced services on weekends and evenings).

== See also ==
- Rail transport in Switzerland
- Public transport in Zurich
- ZVV fare zones
