= Biberbach (Danube) =

River in Baden-Württemberg, Germany

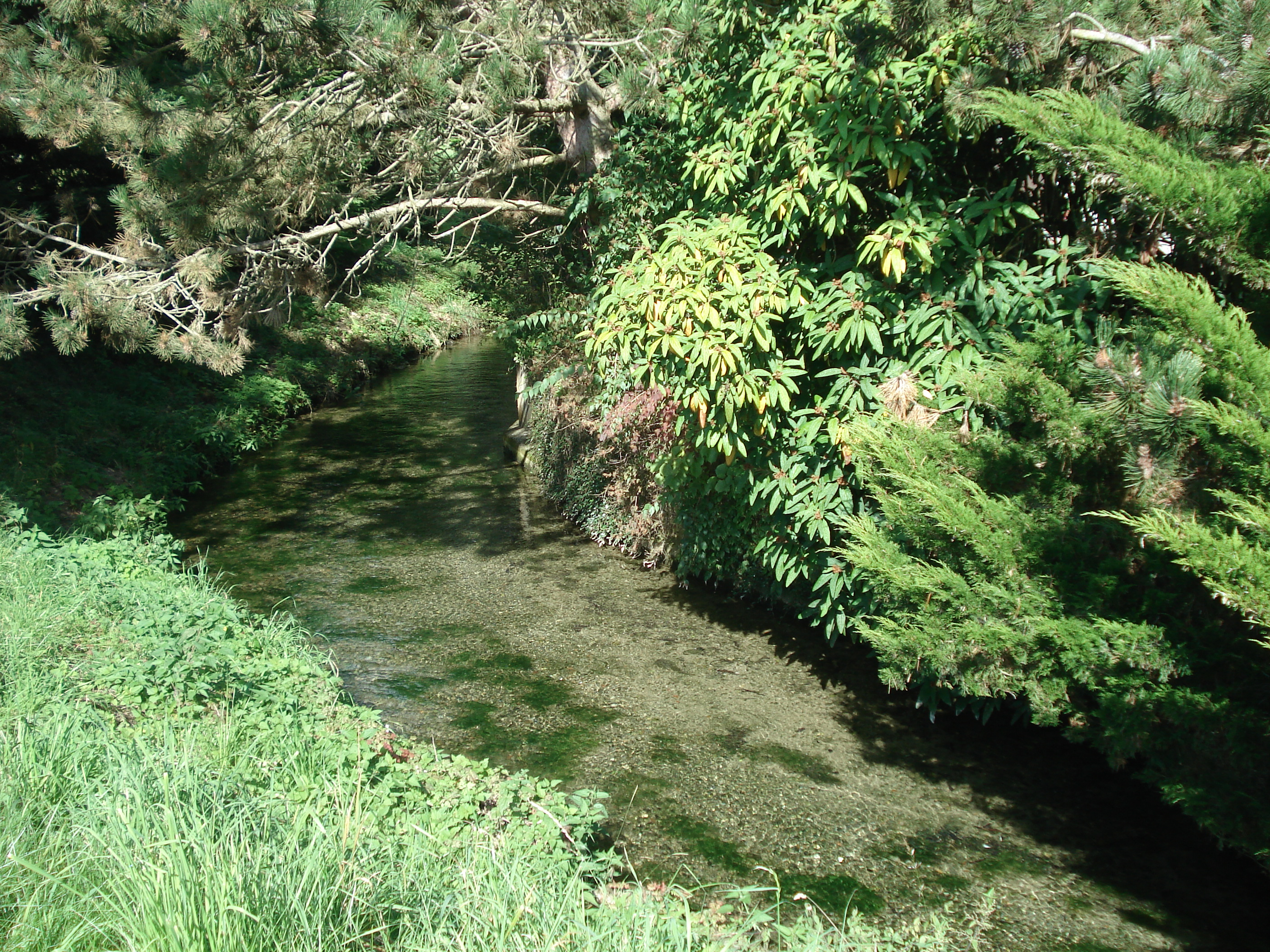
- The Biberbach in Langenenslingen, shortly after its spring

Location
- Country: Germany
- State: Baden-Württemberg

Physical characteristics
- Mouth
  - location: Danube
  - coordinates: 48.1429°N 9.4693°E

Basin features
- Progression: Danube→ Black Sea

Biberbach (German pronunciation: [ˈbiːbɐbax]) is a river in Baden-Württemberg, Germany. It is a left tributary of the Danube in Riedlingen.

== See also ==
- List of rivers of Baden-Württemberg
