= Andelfingen, Germany =

Coordinates: 48°09′N 9°25′E

Andelfingen is a small village in the south of Germany, in the municipality of Langenenslingen, in the district Biberach. It has a population of 1200.
