= S12 (ZVV) =

Railway service in Switzerland

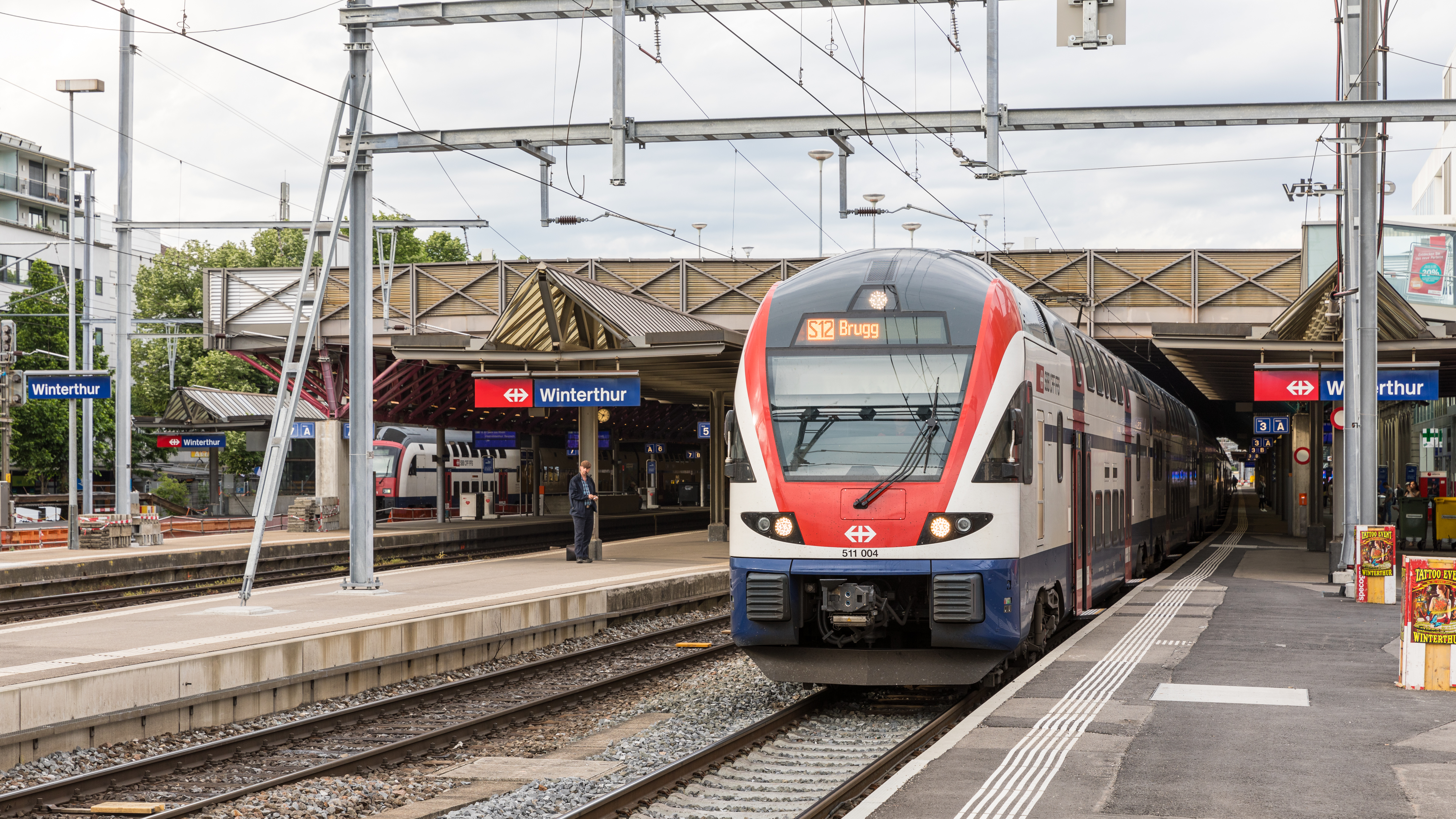
- A Brugg AG-bound S12 service at Winterthur railway station

Overview
- Status: Operational
- Locale: Zürich, Switzerland
- Termini: Wil / Schaffhausen; Brugg AG
- Website: ZVV (in English)

Service
- Type: S-Bahn
- System: Zürich S-Bahn
- Operator(s): Zürcher Verkehrsverbund (ZVV)
- Rolling stock: RABe 511 (most S12 services); Re 450 class+double-decker coaches (weekday S12 services to Schaffhausen)

Technical
- Track gauge: 1,435 mm (4 ft 8 1/2 in) standard gauge

Zürich S-Bahn network as of December 2018

The S12 is a regional railway line of the S-Bahn Zürich on the Zürcher Verkehrsverbund (ZVV), Zürich transportation network. The S12 is one of the network's lines connecting the cantons of Zürich, Aargau, Schaffhausen, Thurgau and St. Gallen.

At Zürich HB, trains of the S12 service usually depart from underground tracks (Gleis) 41–44 (Museumstrasse station).

== Route ==
- S12 Brugg AG–Zürich HB–Zürich Stettbach– Winterthur–Schaffhausen/Wil SG
  Operates non stop between Stettbach and Winterthur; the lines to Schaffhausen and Wil SG are operated alternately at hourly intervals.

Line S12 commences at Brugg station, in the canton of Aargau, and follows the Zürich–Baden railway as far as Zürich Hardbrücke station and the approaches to Zürich Hauptbahnhof station. Passing through the lower level platforms at this station, the line then passes through the Hirschengraben and Zürichberg tunnels, and Stettbach station, before joining the Zürich to Winterthur line. The S12 follows this line as far as Winterthur Hauptbahnhof station, running non-stop between Stettbach and Winterthur, from where it continues to either Schaffhausen, or Wil SG.

Trains on the S12 usually run every 30 minutes, with a journey time of around 96 to 97 minutes. The alternation of trains to Schaffhausen and Wil SG Seen provides an hourly service to each terminus.

== Stations ==
The following stations are served by the S12.

=== Stations served by all S12 trains ===
- Brugg AG
- Turgi
- Baden
- Wettingen
- Neuenhof
- Killwangen-Spreitenbach
- Dietikon
- Glanzenberg
- Schlieren
- Zürich Altstetten
- Zürich Hardbrücke
- Zürich Hauptbahnhof
- Zürich Stadelhofen
- Stettbach
- Winterthur Hauptbahnhof

=== Stations served by trains on the S12 Schaffhausen branch ===
- Winterthur Hauptbahnhof
- Hettlingen
- Henggart
- Andelfingen
- Marthalen
- Dachsen
- Schloss Laufen am Rheinfall
- Neuhausen
- Schaffhausen

=== Stations served by trains on the S12 Wil SG branch ===
- Winterthur Hauptbahnhof
- Winterthur Grüze
- Winterthur Hegi
- Räterschen
- Schottikon
- Elgg
- Aadorf
- Guntershausen
- Eschlikon
- Sirnach
- Wil SG

== Rolling stock ==
As of the December 2022 timetable change, S12 services are operated by RABe 511 units, except for weekday services to Schaffhausen which are run by Re 450 class locomotives pushing or pulling double-deck passenger carriages.

== History ==
Before the timetable change in late 2018, at Winterthur, alternate trains took different routes, running either over the Tösstalbahn as far as Winterthur Seen station, or over the Winterthur to Etzwilen line as far as Seuzach station.

Trains on the old S12 route usually ran every 30 minutes, with a journey time of around 70 to 75 minutes. The alternation of trains to Seuzach and Winterthur Seen provided an hourly service to each terminus.

== See also ==
- Rail transport in Switzerland
- List of railway stations in Zurich
- Public transport in Zurich
- ZVV fare zones
- A-Welle tariff network (Aargau)
