= Schaffhausen railway station =

Railway station in Switzerland

Schaffhausen
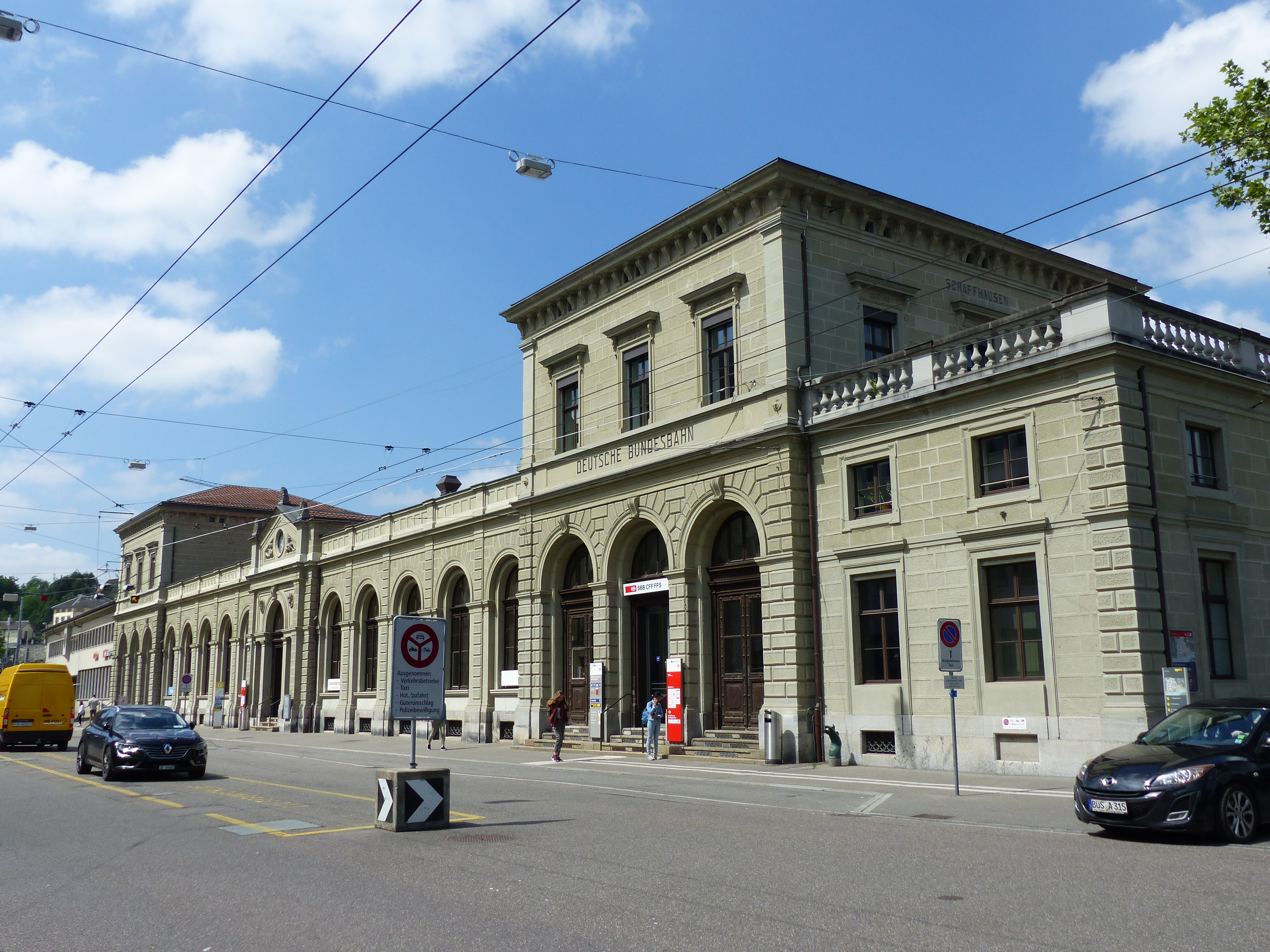
- The station building in 2018

General information
- Location: Bahnhofstrasse; Schaffhausen; Switzerland
- Coordinates: 47°41′54″N 8°37′58″E
- Elevation: 403 m (1,322 ft)
- Owner: Jointly owned by Swiss Federal Railways (65%) and BEV (35%, since 1994)
- Lines: Eglisau to Neuhausen line; Lake line; Rheinfall line; High Rhine Railway (KBS 730)
- Distance: 56.1 km (34.9 mi) from Zürich HB; 364.4 km (226.4 mi) from Mannheim Hbf
- Platforms: 2 island platforms; 2 side platforms
- Tracks: 6
- Train operators: DB Fernverkehr; DB Regio Baden-Württemberg; SBB GmbH; Swiss Federal Railways; THURBO
- Connections
- Bus: VBSH and PostAuto bus lines

Other information
- Fare zone: 810 (Tarifverbund Ostwind)

Passengers
- 2025: 25,100 per day (SBB, SBB GmbH, Thurbo)
- Rank: 32 out of 1,095

Services
Preceding station	DB Fernverkehr	Following station
Zürich HB Terminus	IC 87	Singen (Hohentwiel) towards Stuttgart Hbf
Preceding station	SBB CFF FFS	Following station
Zürich HB Terminus	IC	Singen (Hohentwiel) towards Stuttgart Hbf
Bülach towards Zürich HB	RE48	Terminus
Preceding station	Zurich S-Bahn	Following station
Neuhausen towards Uster	S9	Terminus
Neuhausen towards Brugg AG	S12	Terminus
Neuhausen towards Zug	S24	Herblingen towards Thayngen or Weinfelden
Neuhausen towards Winterthur	S33	Terminus
Neuhausen towards Winterthur	SN3 Limited service	Feuerthalen towards Stein am Rhein
Neuhausen Rheinfall towards Bülach	SN65 Limited service	Terminus
Preceding station	Schaffhausen S-Bahn	Following station
Terminus	S62	Herblingen towards Singen (Hohentwiel)
Neuhausen Bad Bf towards Erzingen (Baden)	S64	Terminus
Neuhausen towards Jestetten	S65	Terminus
Preceding station	St. Gallen S-Bahn	Following station
Terminus	S1	Feuerthalen towards Wil
Preceding station	DB Regio Baden-Württemberg	Following station
Erzingen (Baden) towards Basel Bad Bf	RE 3	Singen (Hohentwiel) towards Friedrichshafen Hafen
Location
- Location within Switzerland Location within Canton of Schaffhausen

Schaffhausen railway station (German: Bahnhof Schaffhausen) is a railway station in Schaffhausen, the capital of the Swiss canton of Schaffhausen. The station is jointly owned by the Swiss Federal Railways (SBB CFF FFS) and Deutsche Bahn (DB), and is served by trains of both national operators, as well as trains of the Swiss regional operator Thurbo.

The station is a major intermediate station on the DB's High Rhine Railway that briefly transits Swiss territory on its route along the northern bank of the High Rhine between Basel and Singen. The station is also linked to the rest of Switzerland by the Rheinfall line to Zürich via Winterthur, the Eglisau to Neuhausen line that crosses German territory (some trains call at Jestetten and Lottstetten in Germany) to reach Eglisau and Zürich, and the Lake line to Rorschach via Stein am Rhein.

It is one of two railway stations in the city of Schaffhausen, the other one being Herblingen.

== Services ==
=== Rail ===
The station is served by long-distance passenger trains running between Zurich and Stuttgart (over the Immendingen–Horb and Horb–Stuttgart lines) and between Basel and Friedrichshafen. Trains of Zürich S-Bahn services S9, S12, S24 and S33 serve the station, with all but the S33 providing a direct service to Zürich. The S1 of the St. Gallen S-Bahn operates over the Lake Line to Diessenhofen, Stein am Rhein, Kreuzlingen, Romanshorn, St. Gallen and Wil.

Trains of the Schaffhausen S-Bahn operate hourly, to and from Jestetten in Germany, with trains calling at Neuhausen and Neuhausen Rheinfall. Trains run half-hourly, to and from Erzingen also in Germany, with a quarter-hourly service at peak times on work days running to and from Beringen calling at Beringerfeld and Neuhausen Badischer Bahnhof. Another hourly S-Bahn links to Singen (Hohentwiel). This route, nicknamed Rhyhas, was operated as RB service by Deutsche Bahn until 2022 but is henceforth operated by SBB GmbH using THURBO EMUs. The S1 and S62 both also operate for Bodensee S-Bahn.

Summary of rail services at Schaffhausen station:

- DB Fernverkehr / SBB CFF FFS: IC 87 / hourly service between Zürich HB and Stuttgart Hbf.
- RE 3: hourly service between Basel Bad Bf and Friedrichshafen Hafen.
- RE48: hourly service to Zürich HB via Bülach and Zürich Oerlikon.
- St. Gallen S-Bahn S1: half-hourly service to Wil via St. Gallen.
- Zurich S-Bahn:
  - S9: hourly service to Uster (via Neuhausen Rheinfall).
  - S12: hourly service to Brugg AG (via Schloss Laufen am Rheinfall).
  - S24: hourly service between Thayngen and Zug (via Zürich Airport).
  - S33: hourly service to Winterthur (via Schloss Laufen am Rheinfall).
- Schaffhausen S-Bahn:
  - S62: half-hourly service to Singen (Hohentwiel).
  - S64: half-hourly service to Erzingen (Baden).
  - S65: hourly service to Jestetten (via Neuhausen Rheinfall).

During weekends, there are also two Nighttime S-Bahn services (SN3, SN65) offered by ZVV.

- SN3: hourly service to Winterthur and Stein am Rhein.
- SN65: hourly service to Bülach (via Rafz).

=== Bus ===
Urban and regional buses stop at the station forecourt, providing regular connections to various destinations in and around the town of Schaffhausen along with destinations further away throughout the canton and principally without railway stations of their own. Most routes are operated by Verkehrsbetriebe Schaffhausen (vbsh):

- Local routes: 1 3 4 5 6 7 8 10
- Regional routes: 21 22 23 24 25 630 634

During weekends, there are several night bus services connecting Schaffhausen railway station with destinations in the municipalities of Schaffhausen and Neuhausen am Rheinfall, and with villages in the canton of Schaffhausen. Night bus lines are designated with an "N" followed by the respective route number (almost all are operated by Verkehrsbetriebe Schaffhausen, vbsh).

== Facilities ==
The station has two ticket offices, one for local tickets and passes and one for the national and international railway ticket sales and services. The station also offers a range of shopping facilities on two levels with various supermarkets, shops, bakeries and eateries as well as a chemist, located within the complex.

== Customs ==
Schaffhausen is, for customs purposes, a border station for passengers arriving from Germany using direct services without intermediate stops. Customs checks may be performed in Schaffhausen station by Swiss officials. Systematic passport controls were abolished when Switzerland joined the Schengen Area in 2008.

== History ==
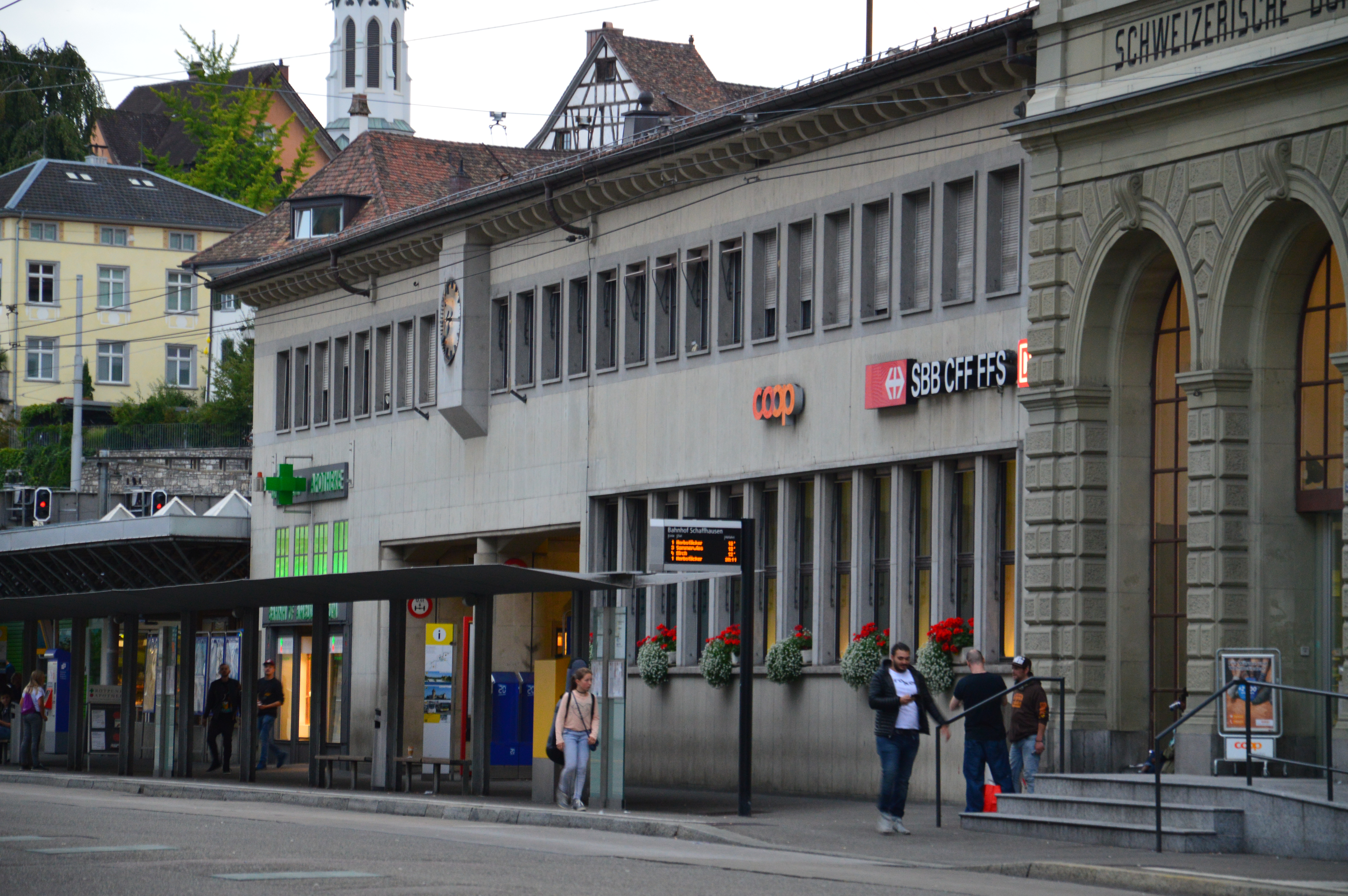
Restored southern wing of the building

The station opened on 16 April 1857 with the opening of the Rheinfall Railway through the Schweizerische Nordostbahn (NOB). It became a through station with the opening of the last section of the High Rhine Railway by the Grand Duchy of Baden State Railway on 15 June 1863. It was connected to the Lake Line of the NOB on 1 November 1894.

On 1 April 1944, the southern part of the station building got damaged during the mistaken bombing of Schaffhausen by the United States Army Air Forces, killing 18 people. This part of the building was replaced by a new construction in 1946.

== See also ==
- Rail transport in Switzerland
