= Rheinfall Railway =

Swiss railway line

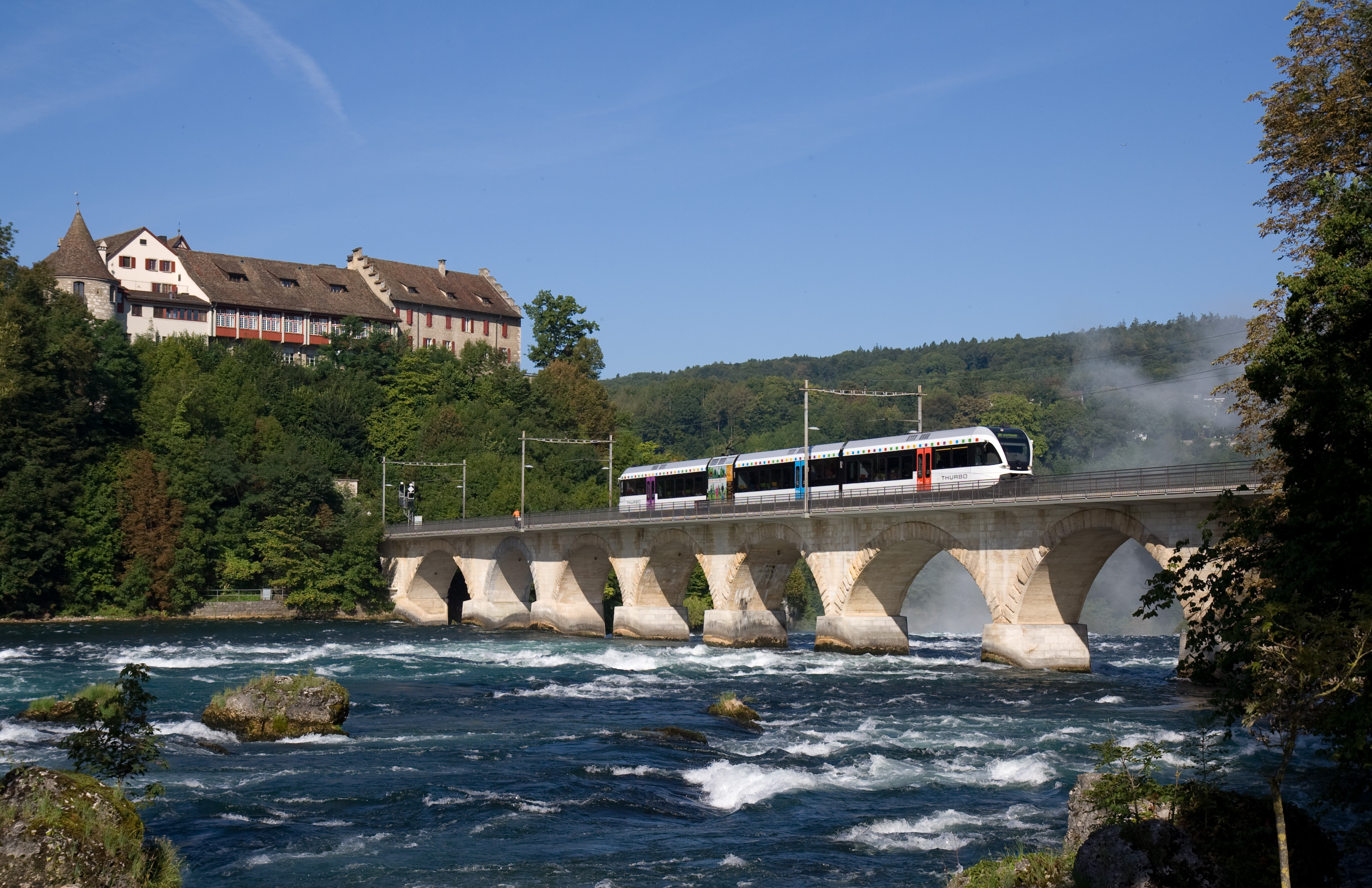
- Bridge carrying the Rheinfall railway over the Rhine above the Rhine Falls

Overview
- Native name: Rheinfallbahn
- Owner: Swiss Federal Railways (SBB CFF FFS)
- Locale: Switzerland
- Termini: Winterthur, ZH; Schaffhausen, SH

History
- Opened: 16 April 1857

Technical
- Line length: 29.92 km (18.59 mi)
- Track gauge: 1,435 mm (4 ft 8 1/2 in)
- Electrification: 15 kV 16.7 Hz AC supplied by overhead line
- Maximum incline: 1.4%

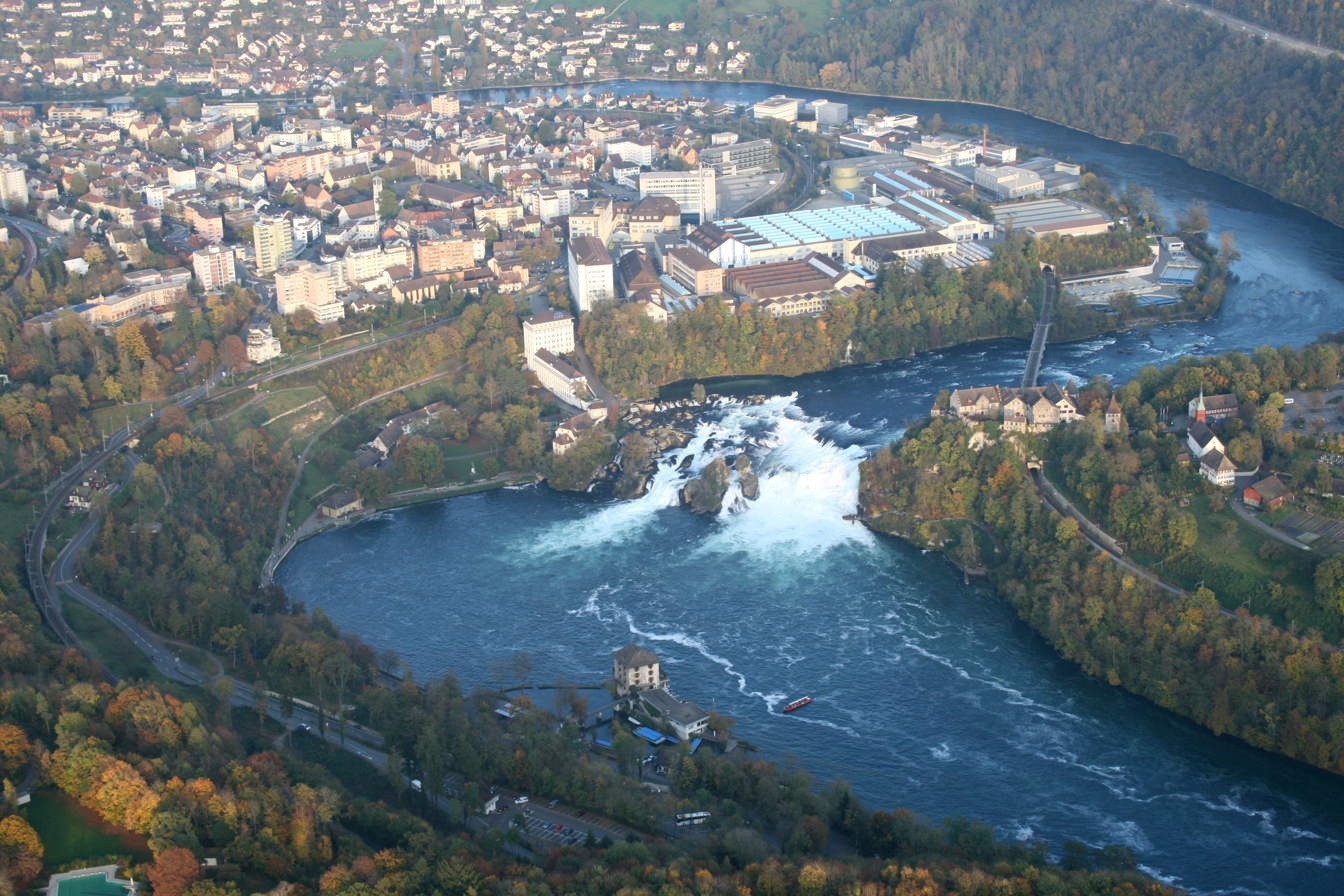
The Rhine Fall, with the Eglisau-Neuhausen line on the near bank and the Rheinfall line on the far bank

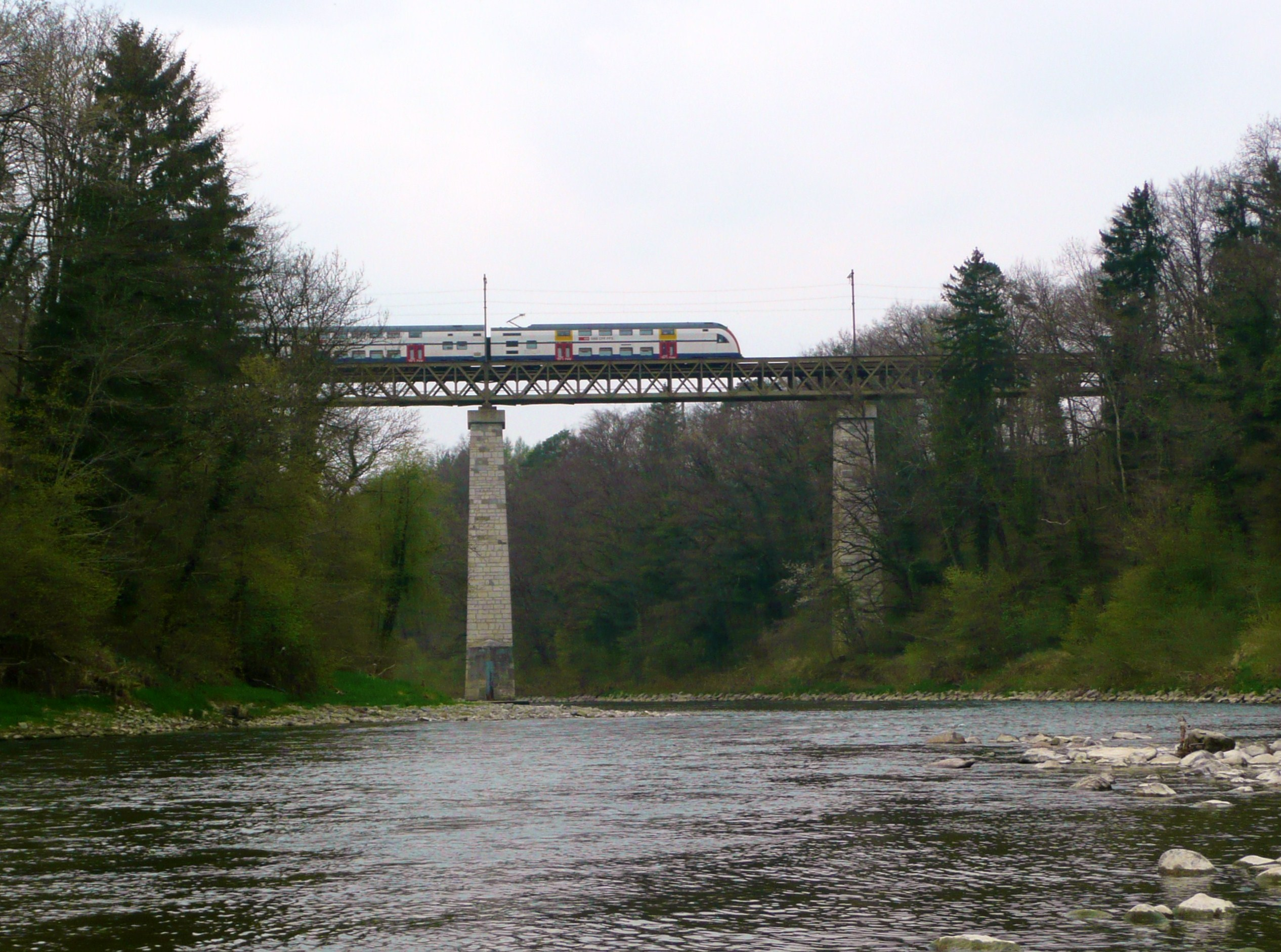
Bridge over the river Thur at Andelfingen

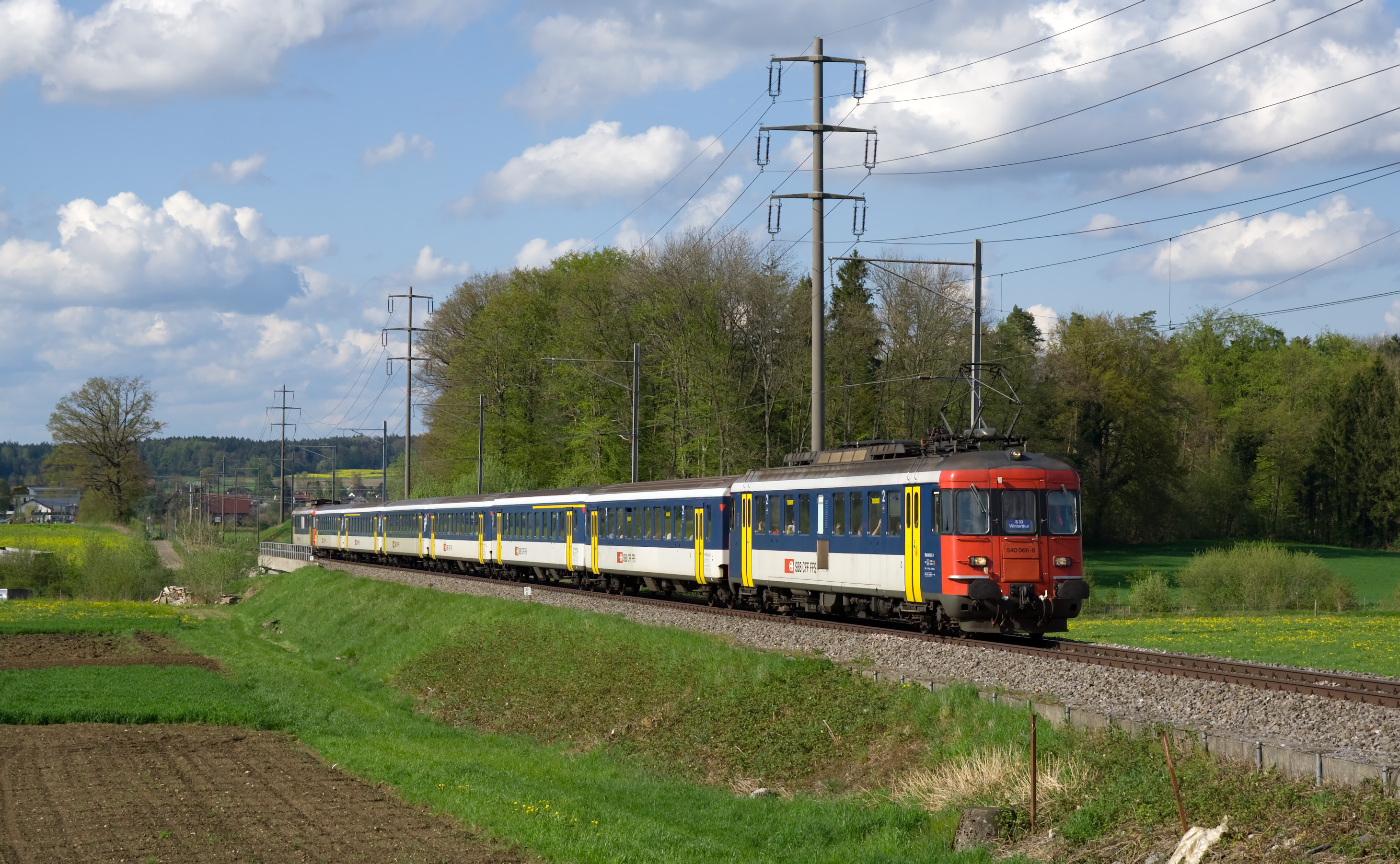
Train on the S33

The Rheinfall Railway (German: Rheinfallbahn) is a railway line in Switzerland. The line links Winterthur in the canton of Zurich with Schaffhausen in the canton of Schaffhausen. The Rheinfall Railway was constructed by the independent Rheinfallbahn-Gesellschaft.

Towards its northern end, the Rheinfall Railway crosses the Rhine on a viaduct adjacent to the famous Rhine Falls, from which it takes its name.

== History ==
The Rheinfallbahn-Gesellschaft was founded in 1853 by the Schaffhausen industrialist Heinrich Moser. Construction of the line commenced in 1855, and it was opened on 16 April 1857. The section of line between Andelfingen and Schaffhausen proved particularly difficult and costly to build, including as it needed major bridges across the rivers Rhine and Thur, together with a tunnel under Laufen Castle.

The Swiss Northeastern Railway (NOB) acquired the Rheinfallbahn-Gesellschaft on 4 November 1856 prior to the line's opening, providing connections to Zurich and beyond. In 1902, the NOB became part of the Swiss Federal Railways (SBB CFF FFS), who retain ownership of the line.

Until 1897, the Rheinfall railway provided the main railway route between Schaffhausen and the rest of Switzerland. However in that year the Eglisau to Neuhausen line opened, providing a shorter route to Zurich via Bülach that is now used by all long distance trains.

The line was electrified on 11 April 1943. In 2007 its 150th anniversary was celebrated by the operation of historic steam trains over the line.

== Operation ==
Today the Rheinfall Railway is served by three lines of the Zurich S-Bahn. The S12 provides an hourly through service between Brugg AG and Schaffhausen via Zurich, serving all stops on the Rheinfall railway section of its route. The S33 links Winterthur and Schaffhausen every hour to create a combined half-hourly service between Schaffhausen and Winterthur, also stopping at all intermediate stations. Additionally, there is an hourly service by the S24 (Zug - Thayngen) on the Rheinfall Railway, stopping only at Andelfingen and Neuhausen.

The northernmost section of the line, between Neuhausen and Schaffhausen, also carries all the traffic using the Eglisau to Neuhausen railway line, such as RegioExpress (RE48) trains between Zurich and Schaffhausen and international trains (IC87) to Stuttgart Hauptbahnhof, together with Schaffhausen S-Bahn line S65 (formerly the S22 of Zurich S-Bahn) from Jetstetten to Schaffhausen. Since the timetable change of 2015 the S9 from Uster to Schaffhausen, took over the part from the former S22, between Bülach and Schaffhausen.

The line is predominantly single track with passing loops at stations, although there are double track sections between Hettlingen and Henggart, in the Marthalen area, and between Neuhausen and Schaffhausen. It is 30.45 kilometres (18.92 mi) long, standard gauge and electrified at 15 kV 16.7 Hz AC supplied by overhead line.

The S-Bahn service over the single-track railway south of Neuhausen leaves little room for other trains, and most freight and long-distance passenger services use alternative routes.

== Bibliography ==
- Eberhard, Jules (1957). Hundert Jahre Rheinfallbahn, 1857–1957. Jubiläumsschrift [One hundred years of the Rheinfall Railway, 1857–1957. Anniversary publication] (in German).
