= Evangelical Reformed Church of the Canton of Schaffhausen =

Coordinates: 47.6759°N 8.6145°E

The Evangelical Reformed Church of the Canton of Schaffhausen is a Reformed state church in Schaffhausen. In 2004 it had 36,000 members and 30 congregations, served by 40 pastors. The church was formed in 1529. It is a member of the Federation of Swiss Protestant Churches and the Conference of Churches on the Rhine.

Congregations are in Altdorf, Bargen, Barzheim, Begginger, Beringen, Bibern, Buch, Buch, Buchberg, Büttenhardt, Dörflingen, Gaschlingen, Guntmadingen, Hallau, Hemishofen, Hemmental, Hofen, Lohn, Löhningen, Merishausen, Neuhausen, Neukirch, Oberhallau, Opfershofen, Osterfinger, Ramsen, Rüdlingen, Schleitheim, seven congregations in Schaffhausen, Siblingen, Stein-Burg, Stein am Rhein, Stetten, Thayngen, Trasadingen

Its biggest and probably oldest church building is the Münster Schaffhausen. Women's ordination is allowed. The Blessing of same-sex unions is allowed.
