= Berta Rahm =

Swiss architect, writer and publisher

- Born: October 4, 1910; St. Gallen, Switzerland
- Died: October 10, 1998 (aged 88); Neunkirch, Switzerland
- Education: ETH Zurich
- Occupation: Architect
- Buildings: Nägeliseehof farm SAFFA exhibition pavilion

Berta Rahm (October 4, 1910 – October 10, 1998) was a Swiss architect, writer, publisher, and feminist activist.

== Life and career ==
Rahm was born on October 4, 1910, in St. Gallen. With some influence from her uncle Arnold Meyer, who owned a successful firm in Hallau, Rahm studied architecture at the ETH Zürich (Eidgenossische Technische Hochschule, the Swiss Federal Institute of Technology in Zürich) from 1929 to 1934. After graduating she traveled through Scandinavia and the Netherlands with grant funding from ETH. Following her travels, she worked in Hallau, Flims and Zürich, until she started her own firm in 1940. Rahm was strongly influenced by Scandinavian architecture and built various vacation houses, single-family residences and exhibition pavilions, most notably the 1959 pavilion for SAFFA, in the Scandinavian style. The relative social and personal freedom allowed women in Scandinavia also formed a lasting impression on Rahm. In 1942 she put together a book on the subject illustrated with her own drawings.

Her position as a woman made it difficult for Rahm to secure building licenses and she was excluded from design competitions, especially for profitable public building projects, and she decided to close her firm and retire as an architect in 1966. Following the closure of her office, she founded a publishing firm, ALA-Verlag, specializing in feminist literature, which operated into the 1990s. ALA-Verlag published a series of women's biographies and reissued classic works of feminism by Mary Wollstonecraft, Flora Tristan and Hedwig Dohm. For each book published under her tenure, she wrote an instructional fore- and afterword.

Rahm was a member of the Schweizerischen Ingenieur- und Architektenvereins (Swiss Engineers and Architects Union), the Union internationale des femmes architectes (UIFA), and the Bund Schweizerischer Frauenorganisationen (Federation of Swiss Women's Associations).

== Projects ==
- Nägeliseehof farm, Hallau, 1951
- Hohweri House, Hallau, 1953–54
- SAFFA exhibition pavilion, Zürich, 1958

== Bibliography ==
- Rahm, Berta. 1939: Reise Nach Skandinavien Und Finnland. Büchergilde Gutenberg, 1942.
- Rahm, Berta. Vom Möblierten Zimmer Bis Zur Wohnung: Anregungen Für Das Einrichten Von Einzelräumen Und Wohnungen. Schweizer Spiegel Verl, 1947.
- Rahm, Berta, and Marie Goegg. Marie Goegg (Geb. Pouchoulin) : Mitbegründerin Der Internationalen Liga Für Frieden Und Freiheit : Gründerin Des Internationalen Frauenbundes, Des Journal Des Femmes Und Der Solidarité. ALA-Verlag, 1993.

== See also ==
- List of women architects
- The International Archive of Women in Architecture
