= Oberhallau =

- Municipality
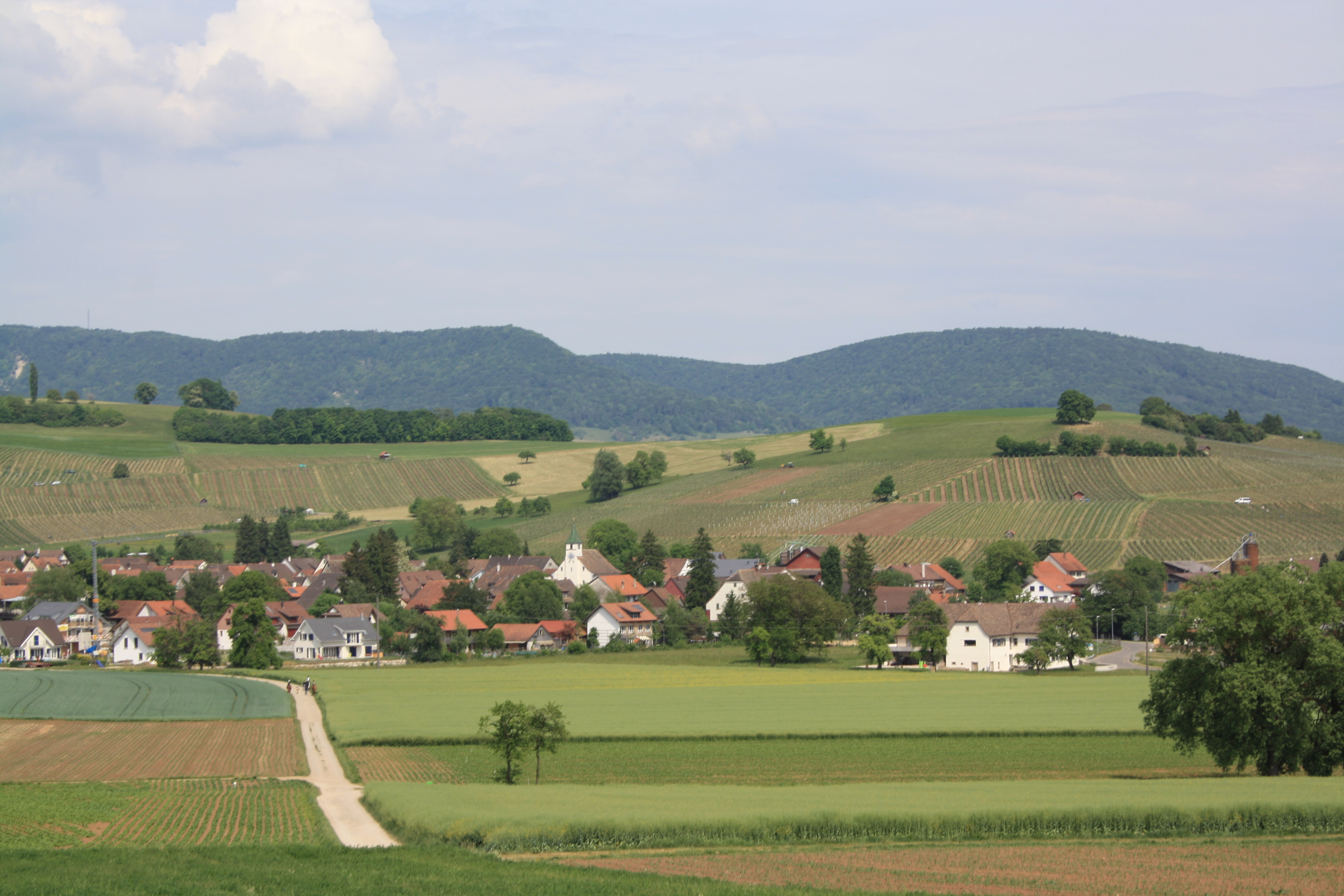

- Flag Coat of arms
- Location of Oberhallau
- Location within Switzerland Location within Canton of Schaffhausen
- Coordinates: 47°42′N 8°28′E
- Country: Switzerland
- Canton: Schaffhausen
- District: n.a.

Area
  - Total: 6.04 km^{2} (2.33 sq mi)
- Elevation: 430 m (1,410 ft)

Population (December 2008)
  - Total: 425
  - Density: 70.4/km^{2} (182/sq mi)
- Time zone: UTC+01:00 (CET)
  - Summer (DST): UTC+02:00 (CEST)
- Postal code: 8216
- SFOS number: 2972
- ISO 3166 code: CH-SH
- Surrounded by: Gächlingen, Hallau, Neunkirch, Schleitheim, Stühlingen (DE-BW)
- Website: www.oberhallau.ch

Oberhallau is a municipality in the canton of Schaffhausen in Switzerland.

== History ==
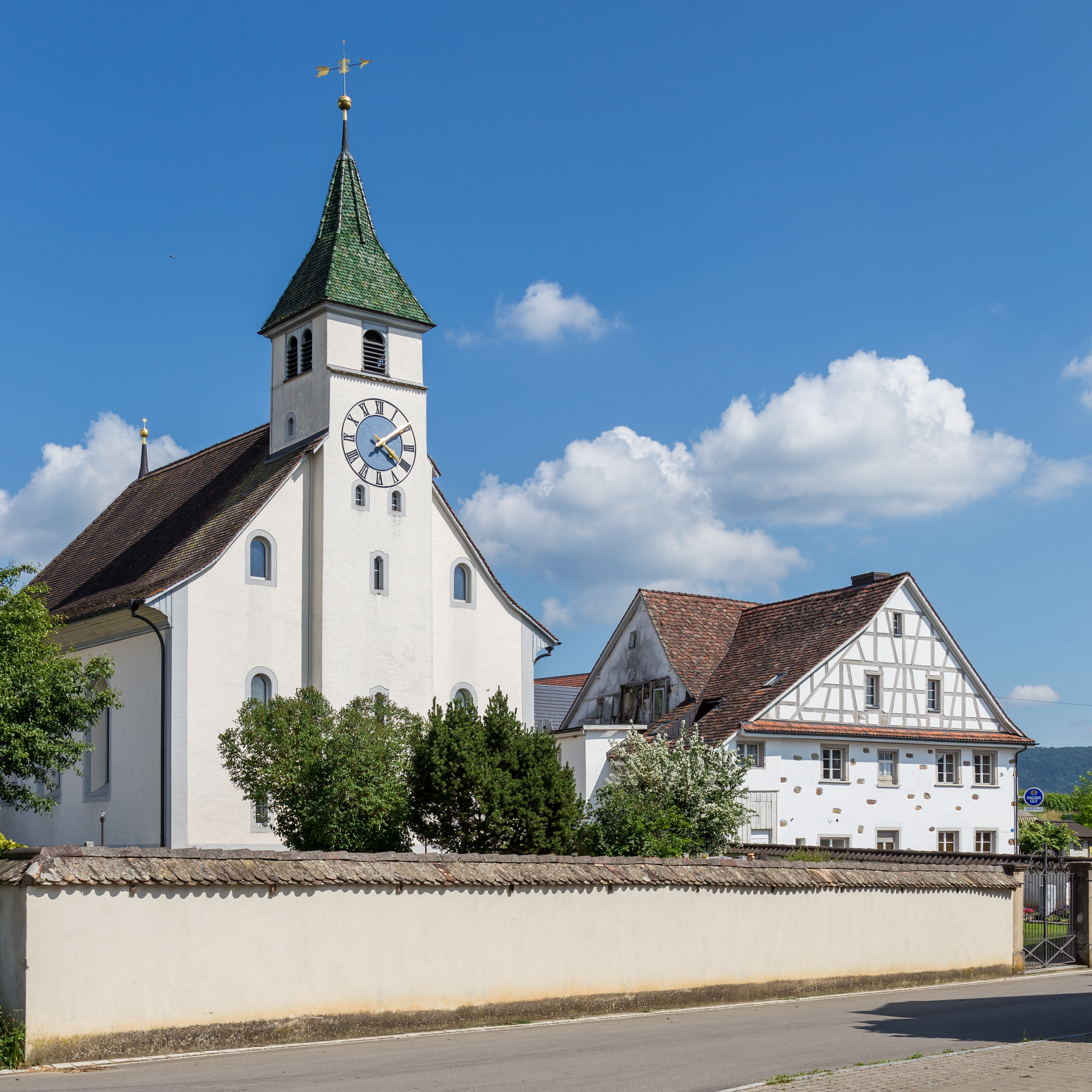
Reformed church in Oberhallau

Both Hallau and Oberhallau are first mentioned in 1095 as Hallaugia superiori et inferiori. Until the Peasants' War of 1653 it was part of Hallau.

== Coat of arms ==
The blazon of the municipal coat of arms is Azure a Fleur-de-lis Argent and overall a Key Or in fess.

== Geography ==
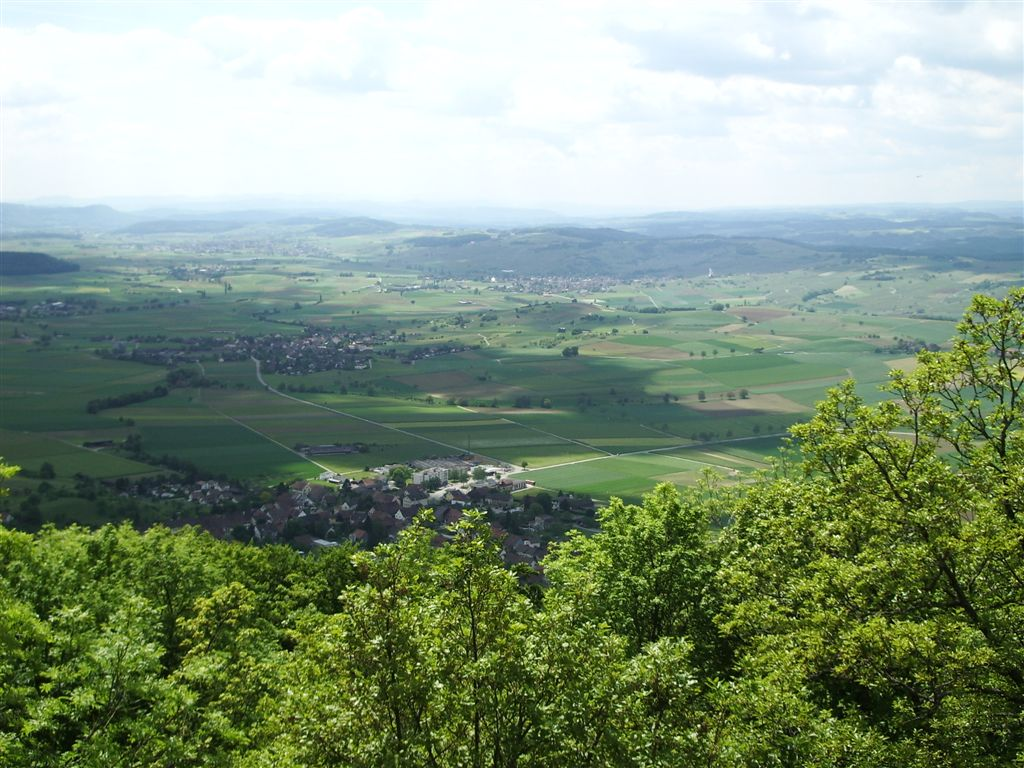
View from the Siblinger watchtower west over the Klettgau. In the foreground is Siblingen, then Gächlingen and Hallau/Oberhallau.

Oberhallau has an area, as of 2006, of 6 km^{2} (2.3 sq mi). Of this area, 72.5% is used for agricultural purposes, while 20.5% is forested. Of the rest of the land, 6.8% is settled (buildings or roads) and the remainder (0.2%) is non-productive (rivers or lakes). The municipality is located in the Unterklettgau district on the foot of the Hallauerberg.

Aerial view from 100 m by Walter Mittelholzer (1923)

== Demographics ==
Oberhallau has a population (as of 2008) of 425, of which 2.4% are foreign nationals. Of the foreign population, (as of 2008), 30% are from Germany, 10% are from Italy, and 60% are from another country. Most of the population (as of 2000) speaks German (97.2%), with Serbo-Croatian being second most common ( 1.0%) and English being third ( 0.5%). The age distribution of the population (as of 2008) is children and teenagers (0–19 years old) make up 22.4% of the population, while adults (20–64 years old) make up 61.6% and seniors (over 64 years old) make up 16%.

In the 2007 federal election the most popular party was the SVP which received 61.5% of the vote. The next two most popular parties were the SP (23.7%), and the FDP (14.7%) .

In Oberhallau about 84.3% of the population (between age 25-64) have completed either non-mandatory upper secondary education or additional higher education (either university or a Fachhochschule). In Oberhallau, as of 2007, 3.56% of the population attend kindergarten or another pre-school, 4.28% attend a Primary School, 4.75% attend a lower level Secondary School, and 3.8% attend a higher level Secondary School.

As of 2000, 13.6% of the population belonged to the Roman Catholic Church and 77.1% belonged to the Swiss Reformed Church.

The historical population is given in the following table:

year	population
1771	399
1798	531
1836	762
1850	734
1900	534
1950	426
2000	397

== Economy ==
Oberhallau has an unemployment rate, as of 2007, of 0.64%. As of 2005, there were 88 people employed in the primary economic sector and about 31 businesses involved in this sector. 18 people are employed in the secondary sector and there are 3 businesses in this sector. 25 people are employed in the tertiary sector, with 7 businesses in this sector.

As of 2008 the mid year average unemployment rate was 0.4%. There were 14 non-agrarian businesses in the municipality and 47.8% of the (non-agrarian) population was involved in the secondary sector of the economy while 52.2% were involved in the third. At the same time, 54.3% of the working population was employed full-time, and 45.7% was employed part-time. There were 46 residents of the municipality who were employed in some capacity, of which females made up 58.7% of the workforce. As of 2000 there were 83 residents who worked in the municipality, while 128 residents worked outside Oberhallau and 18 people commuted into the municipality for work.

As of 2008, there is 1 restaurant in the village and the hospitality industry in Oberhallau employs 2 people.

== Heritage sites of national significance ==
The Stone Age gravesite at Überhürst is listed as a Swiss heritage site of national significance.
