= Neunkirch =

Place in Schaffhausen, Switzerland

- Municipality
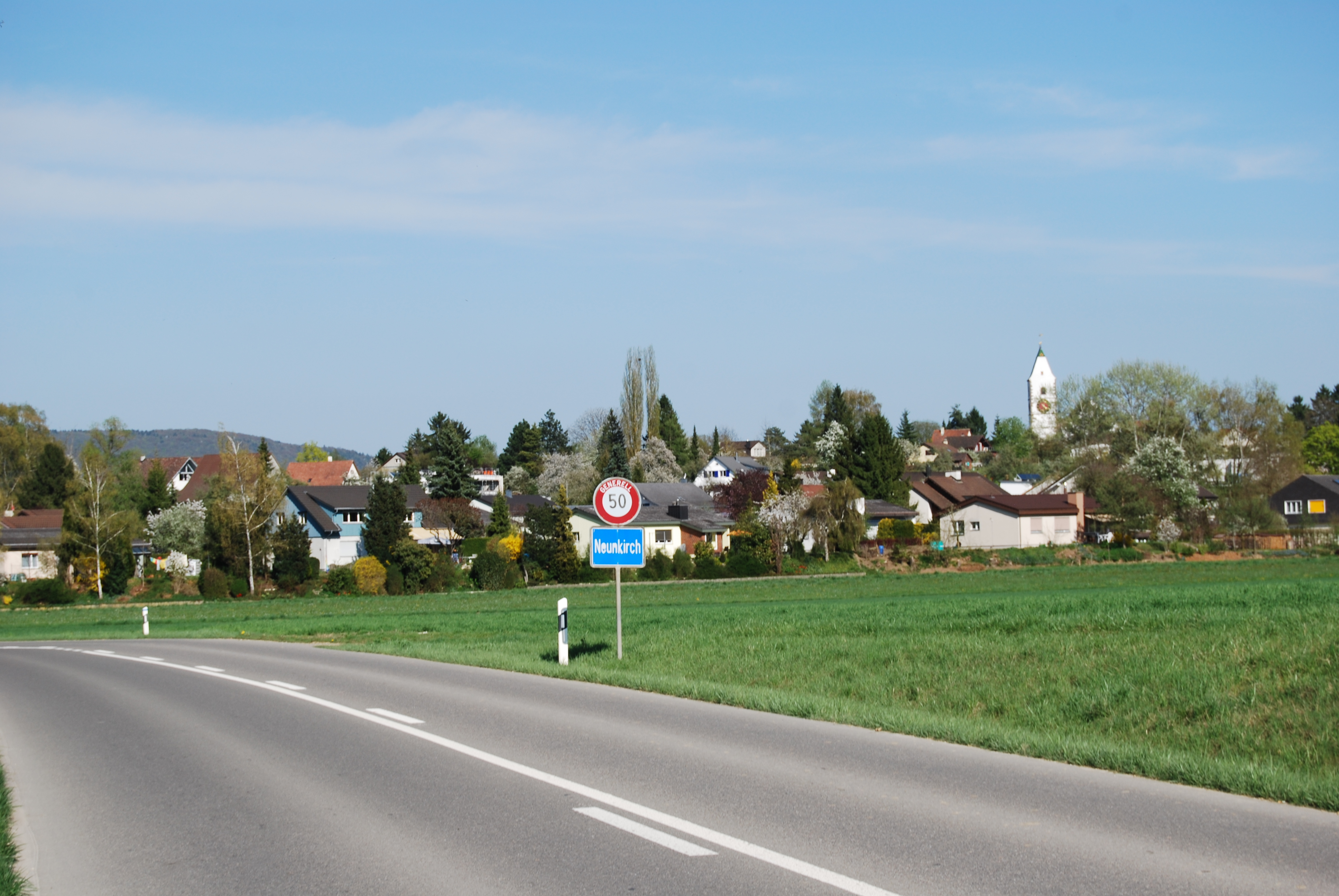

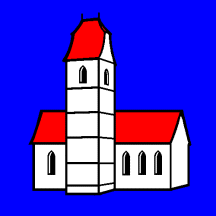
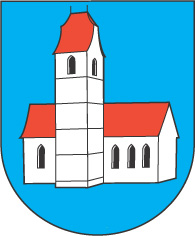
- Flag Coat of arms
- Location of Neunkirch
- Location within Switzerland Location within Canton of Schaffhausen
- Coordinates: 47°41′N 8°29′E
- Country: Switzerland
- Canton: Schaffhausen
- District: n.a.

Government
  - Executive: Gemeinderat with 5 members
  - Mayor: Gemeindepräsident; Ruedi Vögele (as of January 2017)
  - Parliament: none (Gemeindeversammlung)

Area
  - Total: 17.92 km^{2} (6.92 sq mi)
- Elevation (Vor em obere Toor): 429 m (1,407 ft)

Population (December 2020)
  - Total: 2,404
  - Density: 134.2/km^{2} (347.5/sq mi)
- Demonym: German: Neunkirchner(in)
- Time zone: UTC+01:00 (CET)
  - Summer (DST): UTC+02:00 (CEST)
- Postal code: 8213
- SFOS number: 2904
- ISO 3166 code: CH-SH
- Surrounded by: Gächlingen, Guntmadingen, Hallau, Jestetten (DE-BW), Löhningen, Oberhallau, Siblingen, Wilchingen
- Website: www.neunkirch.ch

Neunkirch is a small, historic town and a municipality in the canton of Schaffhausen in Switzerland. It is set in the south of the Lange Rande (900 metres (3,000 ft)), part of the mountain range Randen.

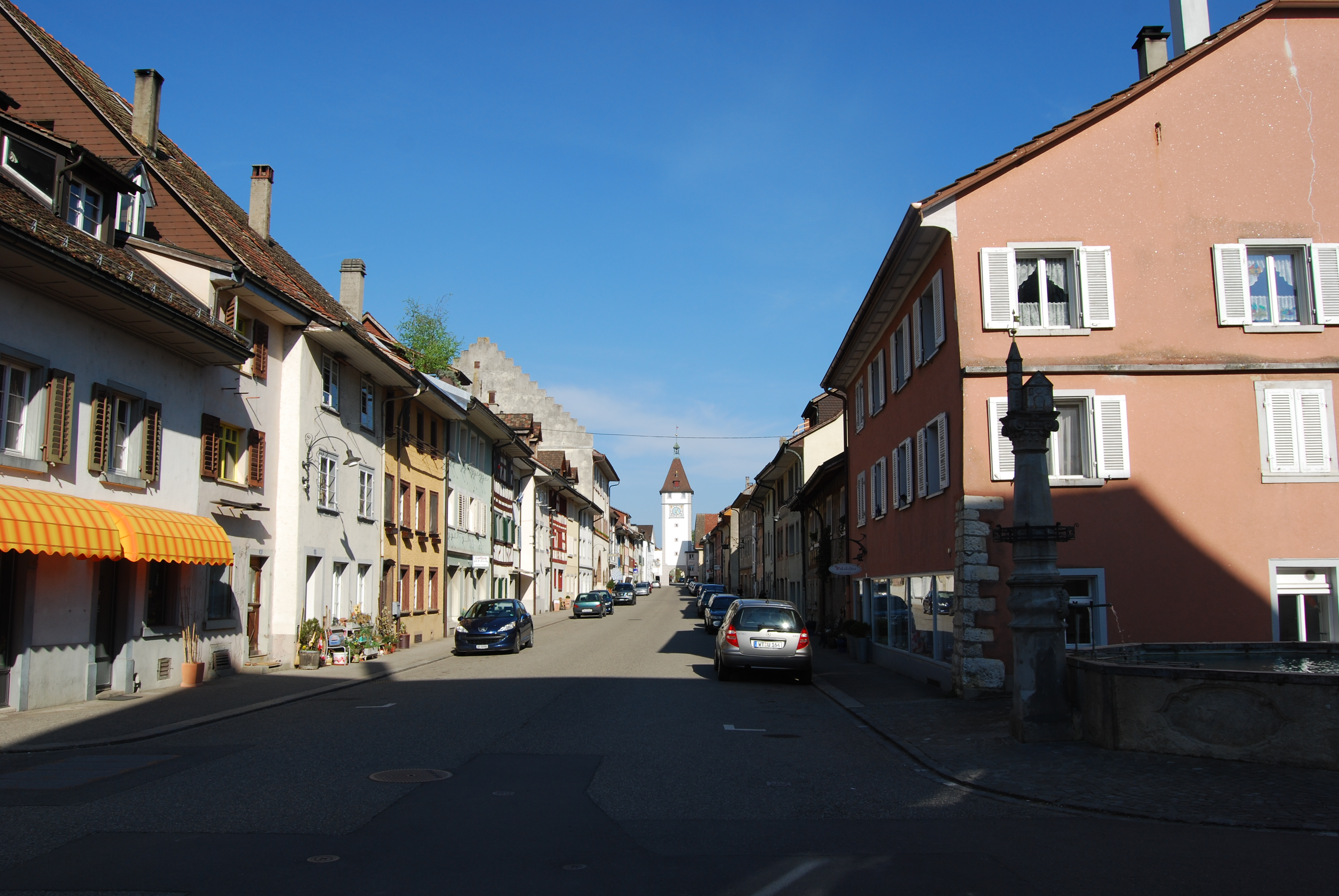
Neunkirch

== Name ==
The first documentary record of Neunkirch is in 850; the town is called Niuchilchun. It is Old High German and means new church. This name varies several times during the ages. Versions are known such as Nuinchilchen, Niuchilchen and Nüwenkilch. Some 17th-century documents mention Nükilch or Nünkilch.

The name was finally fixed as Neunkirch because it belonged to the Bishopric of Constance, whose diocese already included a town called Niuchilchun or Neukirch. To avoid confusion with this town, the names were made different.

== History ==
Aerial view by Walter Mittelholzer (1923)

Neunkirch was mentioned first in a deed of gift to the Rheinau Abbey on a Sunday 21 September in the reign of Louis the German. An exact year is not mentioned. Researches show, that 21 September was a Sunday only in 850, 861, 867 and 872. A commission decided in 1901, that the first year, 850, should officially be taken as the first date Neunkirch was mentioned in.

The document itself doesn't exist anymore, but there is a copy in the public record office of Zürich.

We know from 1150 that the bishop of Konstanz owned the church and a house. In 1260 the bishop bought the majority of land in Neunkirch as well as the low and high justice.

At the end of this century Neunkirch was destroyed; perhaps by war or fire. Afterwards the bishop reconstructed Neunkirch with a plan which had, and still has, a geometrical form. It is a rectangle with four straight streets. The houses are protected by two walls with an open space between. In front of the wall was a ditch partially filled with water.

For 250 years Neunkirch had belonged to the Bishopric of Constance till in 1525 the bishop sold his rights of the low and high justice to Schaffhausen for 8500 guilder.

== Coat of arms ==
The blazon of the municipal coat of arms is Azure a Church Argent roofed Gules. The church on the coat of arms refers to the municipal name of Neunkirch which means New Church.

== Geography ==
Neunkirch has an area, as of 2006, of 17.9 km^{2} (6.9 sq mi). Of this area, 47.5% is used for agricultural purposes, while 45% is forested. Of the rest of the land, 6.8% is settled (buildings or roads) and the remainder (0.6%) is non-productive (rivers or lakes).

== Transport ==
The municipality has a railway station, Neunkirch, on the High Rhine Railway.

== Demographics ==
Neunkirch has a population (as of 2008) of 1,861, of which 14.3% are foreign nationals. Of the foreign population, (as of 2008), 37.6% are from Germany, 17.4% are from Italy, 3.9% are from Croatia, 2.3% are from Serbia, 16.7% are from Macedonia, 2.3% are from Turkey, and 19.8% are from another country. Over the last 10 years the population has grown at a rate of 3.1%. Most of the population (as of 2000) speaks German (94.9%), with Italian being second most common ( 2.1%) and Serbo-Croatian being third ( 0.5%).

The age distribution of the population (as of 2008) is children and teenagers (0–19 years old) make up 25% of the population, while adults (20–64 years old) make up 61.6% and seniors (over 64 years old) make up 13.4%.

In the 2007 federal election the most popular party was the SVP which received 42.1% of the vote. The next two most popular parties were the SP (32.8%), and the FDP (25.1%) .

The entire Swiss population is generally well educated. In Neunkirch about 79.8% of the population (between age 25-64) have completed either non-mandatory upper secondary education or additional higher education (either university or a Fachhochschule). In Neunkirch, as of 2007, 2.25% of the population attend kindergarten or another pre-school, 7.58% attend a Primary School, 4.34% attend a lower level Secondary School, and 3.9% attend a higher level Secondary School.

As of 2000, 20.3% of the population belonged to the Roman Catholic Church and 63.4% belonged to the Swiss Reformed Church.

The historical population is given in the following table:

| year | population |
|---|---|
| about 1300 | ca 170 |
| 1530 | 460 (92 houses) |
| 1798/99 | 1,087 (140 houses) |
| 1850 | 1,640 |
| 1900 | 1,206 |
| 1950 | 1,217 |
| 2000 | 1,722 |

== Economy ==
Neunkirch has an unemployment rate, as of 2007, of 1.6%. As of 2005, there were 51 people employed in the primary economic sector and about 19 businesses involved in this sector. 321 people are employed in the secondary sector and there are 30 businesses in this sector. 313 people are employed in the tertiary sector, with 56 businesses in this sector.

As of 2008 the mid year average unemployment rate was 1.7%. There were 83 non-agrarian businesses in the municipality and 54.1% of the (non-agrarian) population was involved in the secondary sector of the economy while 45.9% were involved in the third. At the same time, 76.8% of the working population was employed full-time, and 23.2% was employed part-time. 682 residents were employed in some capacity; females made up 31.5% of the workforce. As of 2000 there were 252 residents who worked in the municipality, while 538 residents worked outside Neunkirch and 306 people commuted into the municipality for work.

As of 2008, there are 2 restaurants, and 1 hotel with 14 beds. The hospitality industry in Neunkirch employs 9 people.

== Heritage sites of national significance ==
The mediaeval/Early modern period old city and the city walls are listed as Swiss heritage sites of national significance.

The town was founded in the later third of the 13th century by the Bishop of Constance according to a unified plan. The old city is a rectangle with a main east-west street and four parallel small streets. Much of the original character remains, though some renaissance elements were added in the 16th and 17th centuries. Only portions of the old city wall remain, though this includes the large Obertor tower.

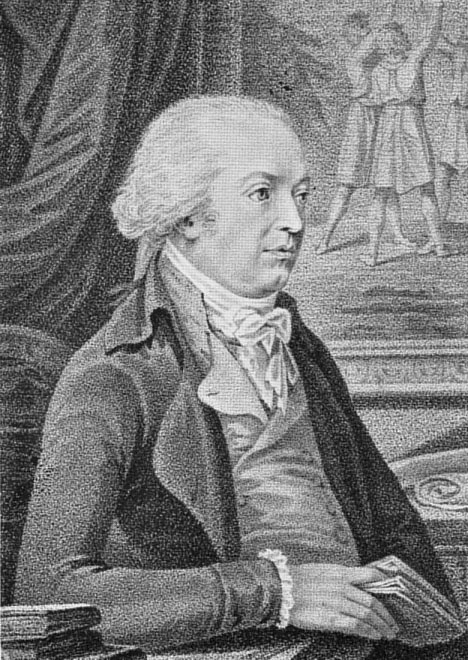
Johannes von Müller, 1791

== Notable people ==
- Johannes von Müller (1752 in Neunkirch – 1809), a Swiss historian
- Berta Rahm (1910 - 1998 in Neunkirch), a Swiss architect, writer, publisher and feminist activist
- Erika Forster-Vannini (born 1944), a Swiss politician, former president of the Swiss Council of States, 2009/2010 and a citizen of Neunkirch
- Aurora Zeka (born 2003 in Neunkirch), a Swiss-Albanian singer
- Bruno Ogbus (born 2005), a Swiss-Nigerian footballer
