= Gächlingen =

- Municipality
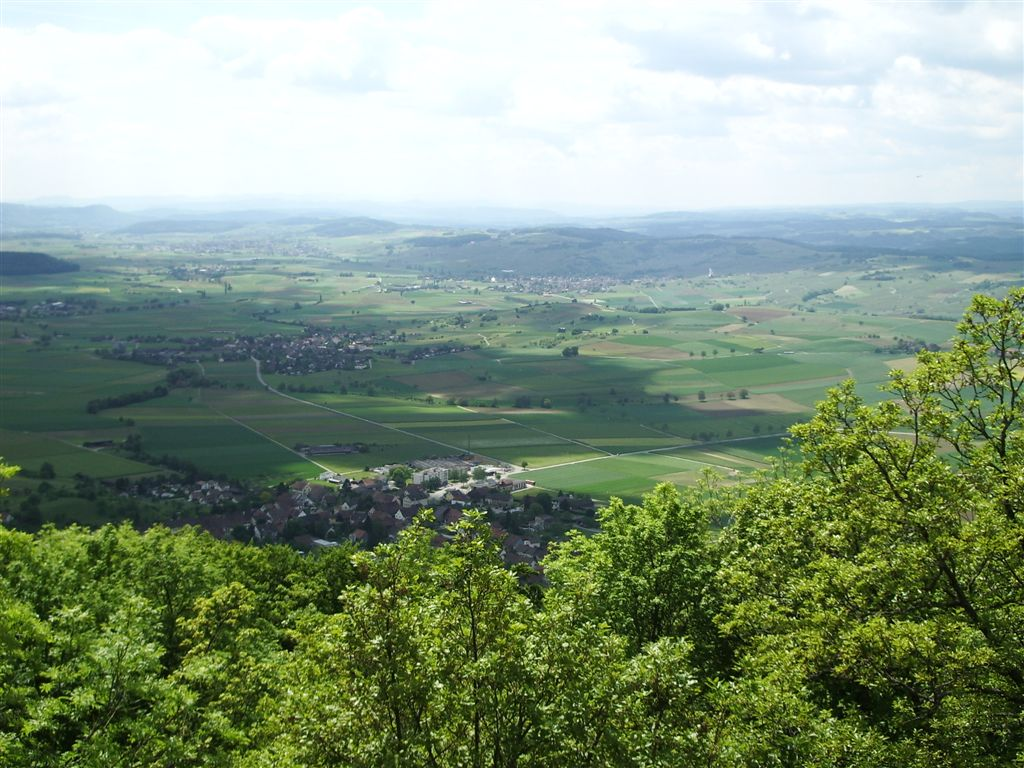

- Flag Coat of arms
- Location of Gächlingen
- Location within Switzerland Location within Canton of Schaffhausen
- Coordinates: 47°42′N 8°30′E
- Country: Switzerland
- Canton: Schaffhausen
- District: n.a.

Area
  - Total: 7.13 km^{2} (2.75 sq mi)
- Elevation: 460 m (1,510 ft)

Population (December 2008)
  - Total: 764
  - Density: 107/km^{2} (278/sq mi)
- Time zone: UTC+01:00 (CET)
  - Summer (DST): UTC+02:00 (CEST)
- Postal code: 8214
- SFOS number: 2901
- ISO 3166 code: CH-SH
- Surrounded by: Neunkirch, Oberhallau, Schleitheim, Siblingen
- Website: gaechlingen.ch

Gächlingen is a municipality in the canton of Schaffhausen in Switzerland.

== History ==
Aerial view by Walter Mittelholzer (1923)

An area near Gächlingen was the site of the first settlement in Switzerland. This Linear Band Ceramic settlement dates to about 6000BC and is the first long-term, farming community in the borders of modern Switzerland. Gächlingen is first mentioned in a 10th Century forgery as Câhtelinga. In 1049 it was mentioned as Gehtelinga.

== Geography ==
Gächlingen has an area, as of 2006, of 7.3 km^{2} (2.8 sq mi). Of this area, 75.1% is used for agricultural purposes, while 17.6% is forested. Of the rest of the land, 7% is settled (buildings or roads) and the remainder (0.3%) is non-productive (rivers or lakes).

The municipality is located in the Oberklettgau district. It is a wine producing village on the south flank of the Randen mountain.

== Heritage sites of national significance ==
The Goldäcker, a Neolithic settlement is listed as a Swiss heritage site of national significance. While the region that would become Switzerland had been occupied by nomadic hunter-gatherers the settlement at Goldäcker is the first long-term, farming settlement in Switzerland. About 6000 BC, a group of Linear Band Ceramic Culture farmers moved south over the Danube river. They settled in a small hamlet on the western border of modern Gächlingen. Their settlement included both houses and manufacturing buildings.

Additionally, the entire village of Gächlingen is designated as part of the Inventory of Swiss Heritage Sites.

== Coat of arms ==
The blazon of the municipal coat of arms is Gules a Sickle Argent ringed Or handled proper and a Ploughshare of the second.

== Demographics ==
Gächlingen has a population (as of 2008) of 764, of which 5.5% are foreign nationals. Of the foreign population, (as of 2008), 36.4% are from Germany, 6.8% are from Italy, 13.6% are from Macedonia, and 43.2% are from another country. Over the last 10 years the population has decreased at a rate of -5.5%. Most of the population (as of 2000) speaks German (96.1%), with Albanian being second most common ( 1.0%) and Italian being third ( 0.7%).

The age distribution of the population (as of 2008) is children and teenagers (0–19 years old) make up 18.8% of the population, while adults (20–64 years old) make up 61.5% and seniors (over 64 years old) make up 19.6%.

In the 2007 federal election the most popular party was the SVP which received 47.4% of the vote. The next two most popular parties were the SP (29.6%), and the FDP (23.1%) .

In Gächlingen about 74.6% of the population (between age 25–64) have completed either non-mandatory upper secondary education or additional higher education (either university or a Fachhochschule). In Gächlingen, as of 2007, 0.77% of the population attend kindergarten or another pre-school, 7.35% attend a Primary School, 2.96% attend a lower level Secondary School, and 4.77% attend a higher level Secondary School.

As of 2000, 11.5% of the population belonged to the Roman Catholic Church and 74.3% belonged to the Swiss Reformed Church.

The historical population is given in the following table:

year	population
1531	24 Households
1801	705
1850	1,194
1900	794
1950	682
1970	604
2000	872

== Economy ==
Gächlingen has an unemployment rate of 1.03%. As of 2005, there were 84 people employed in the primary economic sector and about 30 businesses involved in this sector. 46 people are employed in the secondary sector and there are 10 businesses in this sector. 48 people are employed in the tertiary sector, with 18 businesses in this sector.

As of 2008 the mid year average unemployment rate was 0.5%. There were 35 non-agrarian businesses in the municipality and 49.5% of the (non-agrarian) population was involved in the secondary sector of the economy while 50.5% were involved in the third. At the same time, 67.3% of the working population was employed full-time, and 32.7% was employed part-time. There were 101 residents of the municipality who were employed in some capacity, of which females made up 30.7% of the workforce. As of 2000 there were 129 residents who worked in the municipality, while 277 residents worked outside Gächlingen and 93 people commuted into the municipality for work.

As of 2008, there is 1 restaurant and the hospitality industry in Gächlingen employs 1 people.
