= Hemmental =

- Former municipality
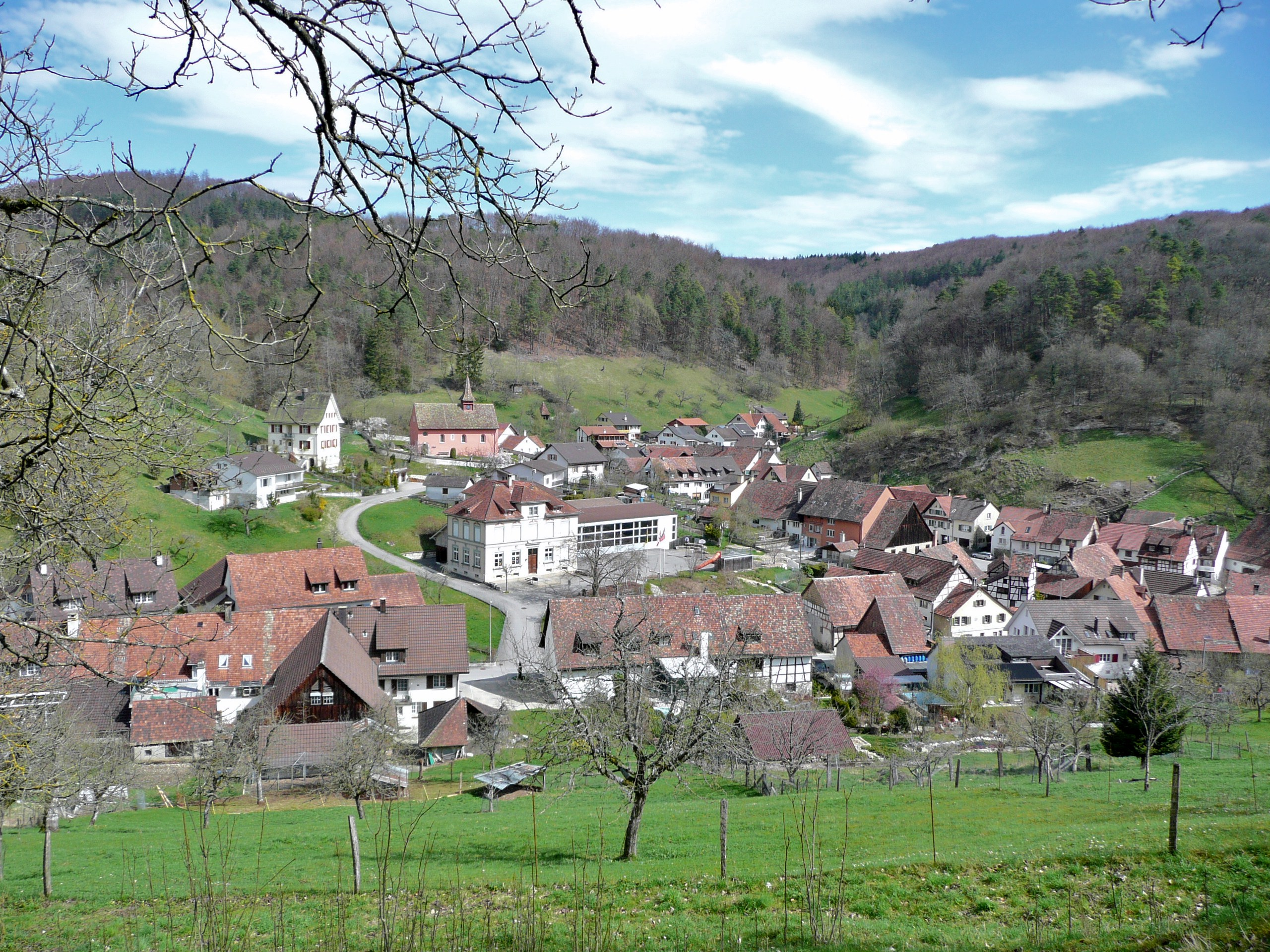
- Hemmental village

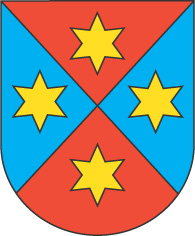
- Coat of arms
- Location of Hemmental
- Location within Switzerland Location within Canton of Schaffhausen
- Coordinates: 47°44′N 8°35′E
- Country: Switzerland
- Canton: Schaffhausen
- District: n.a.

Government
  - Mayor: Hermann Schlatter

Area
  - Total: 10.78 km^{2} (4.16 sq mi)
- Elevation: 588 m (1,929 ft)

Population (December 2005)
  - Total: 542
  - Density: 50.3/km^{2} (130/sq mi)
- Time zone: UTC+01:00 (CET)
  - Summer (DST): UTC+02:00 (CEST)
- Postal code: 8231
- SFOS number: 2934
- ISO 3166 code: CH-SH
- Surrounded by: Beggingen, Beringen, Merishausen, Schleitheim, Schaffhausen, Siblingen
- Website: www.hemmental.ch

Hemmental was a municipality in the canton of Schaffhausen in Switzerland. In 2009 Hemmental merged with Schaffhausen.

Hemmental was roughly 4.5 km (2.8 mi) outside of the city limits of Schaffhausen and 7 km (4.3 mi) away from the Schaffhausen train station.

Aerial view (1964)

== First Settlement ==
It is generally accepted that Hemmental was settled between the 7th and 8th centuries by the Alemans. Local tradition states that the village was named after a Germanic priest probably named Hemo. In 1090, Count Burkard of Nelleburg gave Hemmental, together with Buesingen, to the Abbey of Allerheiligen in Schaffhausen.

== Leu, Schlatter, Hatt and Mettler families ==
In the year 1483, the name "Schlatter" first appears in Hemmental, followed by those of "Mettler", "Hatt" and "Leu". These families dominated in the area. Today, there are also the four place names, Schlatter, Leuen, Hatten and Mettlerhof reflecting this influence. Three of these family names still prevail in Hemmental; the name Mettler no longer being found here. It is these four names which, in 1951, led to the resolution that a new village coat of arms be introduced - four golden stars on blue and red shield. The blazon of the municipal coat of arms is Per saltire Gules and Azure in each a Mullet Or.

== Geography ==
Hemmental had an area, as of 2006, of 10.9 km^{2} (4.2 sq mi). Of this area, 26.6% is used for agricultural purposes, while 70.3% is forested. The rest of the land, (3%) is settled. It is a farming village at the foot of the Randen range.

== Demographics ==
In the 2007 federal election the most popular party was the SVP which received 53.9% of the vote. The next two most popular parties were the SP (27.2%), and the FDP (18.8%).

The historical population is given in the following table:

year	population
1771	241
1798	305
1836	372
1850	409
1900	496
1950	409
2000	513
