= Guntmadingen =

- Former municipality
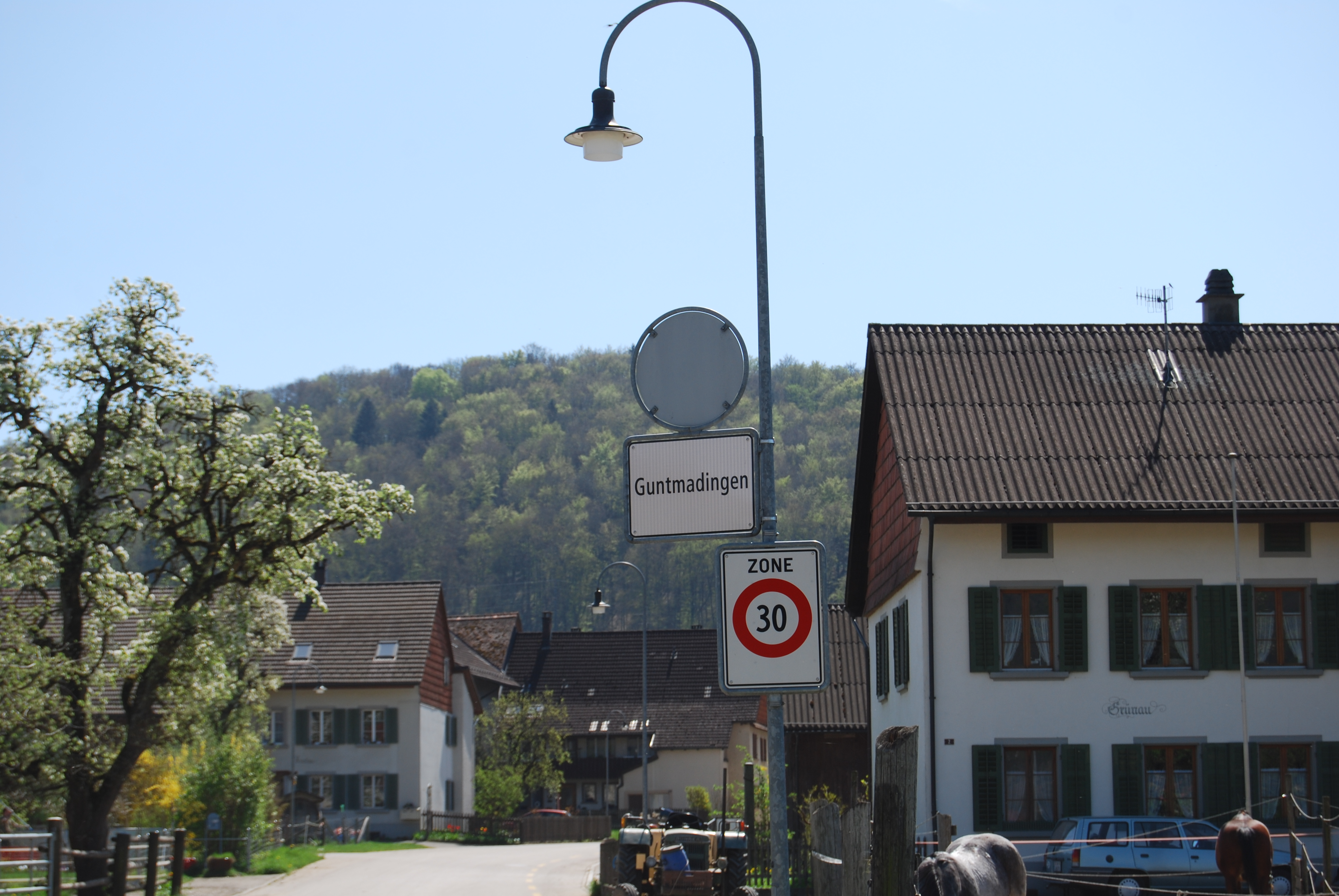

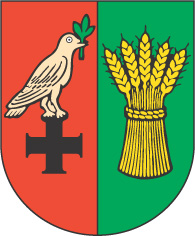
- Coat of arms
- Location of Guntmadingen
- Location within Switzerland Location within Canton of Schaffhausen
- Coordinates: 47°41′N 8°33′E
- Country: Switzerland
- Canton: Schaffhausen
- District: n.a.

Area
  - Total: 4.49 km^{2} (1.73 sq mi)
- Elevation: 448 m (1,470 ft)

Population (Dec 2010)
  - Total: 237
  - Density: 52.8/km^{2} (137/sq mi)
- Time zone: UTC+01:00 (CET)
  - Summer (DST): UTC+02:00 (CEST)
- Postal code: 8223
- SFOS number: 2902
- ISO 3166 code: CH-SH
- Surrounded by: Beringen, Jestetten (DE-BW), Löhningen, Neuhausen am Rheinfall, Neunkirch
- Website: guntmadingen.ch

Guntmadingen is a former municipality in the canton of Schaffhausen in Switzerland. On 1 January 2013 the former municipality of Guntmadingen merged into the municipality of Beringen.

== History ==
Aerial view (1964)

Guntmadingen is first mentioned in 1111 as Guntrammingin, though this comes from a 12th-century forgery. In 1122 it was mentioned as Guntramingin.

== Coat of arms ==
The blazon of the municipal coat of arms is Per pale Gules a Dove Argent statant on a Cross patte sable regardant to sinister holding in the beak a branch Vert and of the last a Garb Or.

== Geography ==
Before the merger, Guntmadingen had a total area of 4.6 km^{2} (1.8 mi^{2}). Of this area, 37.8% is used for agricultural purposes, while 56.7% is forested. The rest of the land, (5.5%) is settled.

The municipality is located in the Oberklettgau district. The farming municipality is located at the foot of the Lauferberg and includes a high, forested region.

== Demographics ==
Guntmadingen had a population (as of 2010) of 237. In 2008 a total of 5.6% were foreign nationals. Of the foreign population, (as of 2008), 35.7% are from Germany, 14.3% are from Italy, and 50% are from another country. Over the last 10 years the population has grown at a rate of 4.7%. Most of the population (as of 2000) speaks German (97.3%), with Swedish being second most common ( 0.8%) and English being third ( 0.4%).

The age distribution of the population (as of 2008) is children and teenagers (0–19 years old) make up 25.4% of the population, while adults (20–64 years old) make up 59.7% and seniors (over 64 years old) make up 14.9%.

In the 2007 federal election the most popular party was the SVP which received 65.1% of the vote. The next two most popular parties were the SP (21.3%), and the FDP (13.6%) .

The entire Swiss population is generally well educated. In Guntmadingen about 77.1% of the population (between age 25–64) have completed either non-mandatory upper secondary education or additional higher education (either university or a Fachhochschule). In Guntmadingen, as of 2007, 2.86% of the population attend kindergarten or another pre-school, 8.98% attend a Primary School, 2.45% attend a lower level Secondary School, and 3.27% attend a higher level Secondary School.

As of 2000, 10.1% of the population belonged to the Roman Catholic Church and 77.1% belonged to the Swiss Reformed Church.

The historical population is given in the following table:

year	population
1771	105
1798	134
1850	232
1900	176
1950	208
2000	258

== Economy ==
Guntmadingen has an unemployment rate of 0.73%. As of 2005, there were 43 people employed in the primary economic sector and about 15 businesses involved in this sector. 9 people are employed in the secondary sector and there are 4 businesses in this sector. 8 people are employed in the tertiary sector, with 4 businesses in this sector.

As of 2008 the mid year average unemployment rate was 0.6%. There were 8 non-agrarian businesses in the municipality and 40% of the (non-agrarian) population was involved in the secondary sector of the economy while 60% were involved in the third. At the same time, 55% of the working population was employed full-time, and 45% was employed part-time. There were 20 residents of the municipality who were employed in some capacity, of which females made up 35% of the workforce. As of 2000 there were 39 residents who worked in the municipality, while 84 residents worked outside Guntmadingen and 15 people commuted into the municipality for work.

As of 2008, there is 1 restaurant and the hospitality industry in Guntmadingen employs 4 people.
