= Hallau =

- Municipality
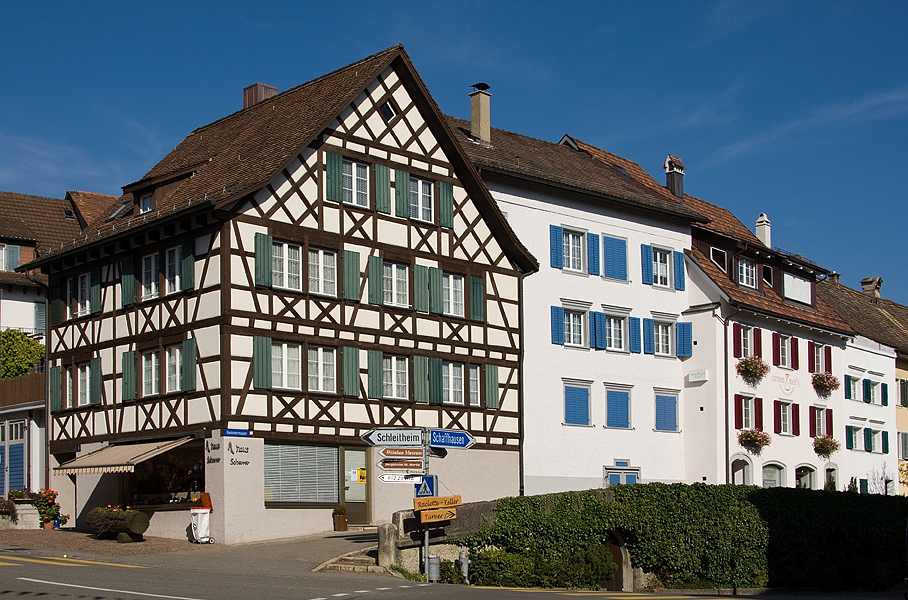

- Flag Coat of arms
- Location of Hallau
- Location within Switzerland Location within Canton of Schaffhausen
- Coordinates: 47°41′N 8°27′E
- Country: Switzerland
- Canton: Schaffhausen
- District: n.a.

Area
  - Total: 15.32 km^{2} (5.92 sq mi)
- Elevation: 421 m (1,381 ft)

Population (December 2008)
  - Total: 2,014
  - Density: 131.5/km^{2} (340.5/sq mi)
- Time zone: UTC+01:00 (CET)
  - Summer (DST): UTC+02:00 (CEST)
- Postal code: 8215
- SFOS number: 2971
- ISO 3166 code: CH-SH
- Surrounded by: Eggingen (DE-BW), Neunkirch, Oberhallau, Stühlingen (DE-BW), Trasadingen, Wilchingen
- Twin towns: Bergün (Switzerland)
- Website: hallau.ch

Hallau (known officially until 1934 as Unterhallau) is a municipality in the canton of Schaffhausen in Switzerland.

== History ==
Though Bronze Age weapons have been found in Hallau, the first traces of a settlement date from the Roman era. A Roman warehouse was found in Hüttenhau as well as numerous Roman coins. The area was settled by the Alamanni. An Alamanni graveyard exists near the Church of St. Moritz, as well as the ruins of the Alamanni village of Atlingen.

Hallau is first mentioned in 1095 as Hallaugia superiori et inferiori. In 1273 it was mentioned as Hallowe. Until 1526 it was part of Oberhallau.

About two-thirds of the land in Hallau was originally owned by the Benedictine monastery of All Saints in Schaffhausen. In the tax record from 1100, there are no vineyards mentioned in the villages. It is not until the Kelhofbrief of 1280 that the local vineyards first appear. In 1302 the Bishop of Konstanz acquired the vogtei rights over both villages. In 1343 the village organized the Gebursami ze Hallow and secured the market rights, a mill, salt tax and other rights for themselves. In the 2nd half of the 15th Century the Bishop and the Landgrave of Sulz fought over the High justice rights in the Klettgau valley. During the Late Middle Ages and the Early modern period the villages expanded. They purchased the Lauferberg at some point, in 1457 they bought the Vogtei Wunderklingen an der Wutach and in 1507 the weir and water mill.

== Geography ==
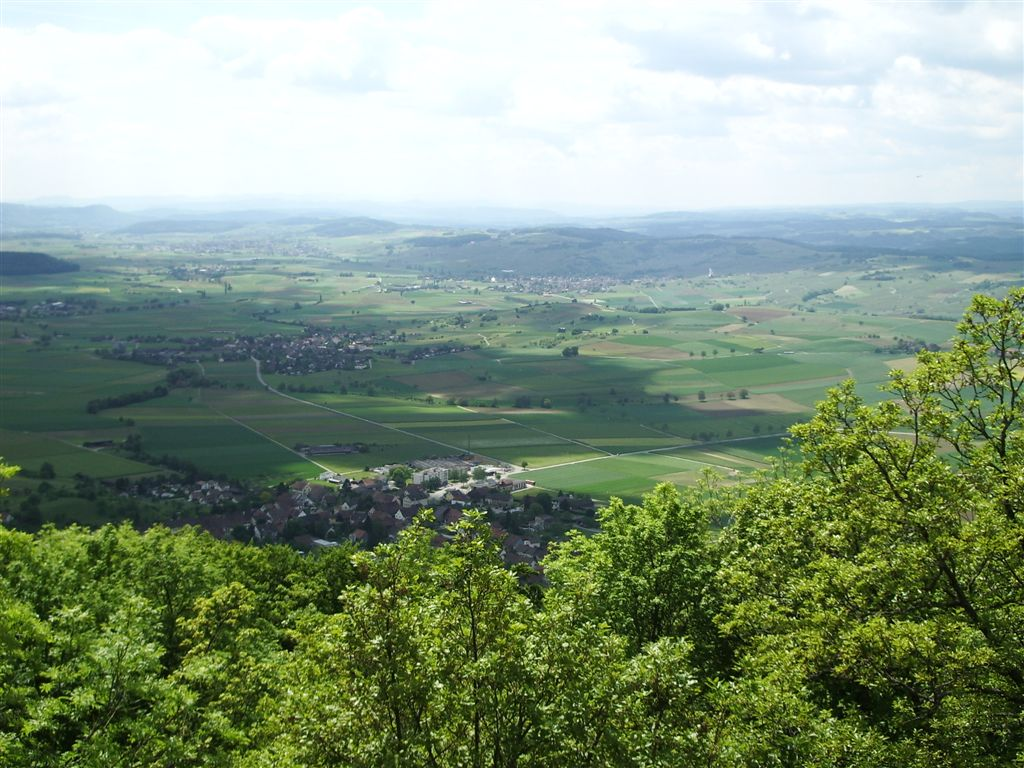
View from the Randen over the Klettgau. Hallau is the background

Hallau has an area, as of 2006, of 15.3 km^{2} (5.9 sq mi). Of this area, 50.5% is used for agricultural purposes, while 40.3% is forested. Of the rest of the land, 8.7% is settled (buildings or roads) and the remainder (0.5%) is non-productive (rivers or lakes).

The municipality is located in the Unterklettgau district. It is an old market town that is now a winemaking village. Hallau is located on the south foot of the Hallauerberg. Until 1934 Hallau was known as Unterhallau.

== Climate ==
Hallau has an Oceanic Climate (Cfb) closely bordering on a Warm summer humid continental climate (Dfb) according to the Köppen climate classification, with an average of 118.6 days of rain or snow per year and on average receives 806 mm (31.7 in) of precipitation. The precipitation rates are somewhat lower when compared to other places in northern Switzerland due to the Klettgau region's location in the rain shadow of the Black Forest mountains.

Climate data for Hallau, elevation 419 m (1,375 ft), (1991–2020)
Month	Jan	Feb	Mar	Apr	May	Jun	Jul	Aug	Sep	Oct	Nov	Dec	Year
Mean daily maximum °C (°F)	3.1 (37.6)	5.3 (41.5)	10.5 (50.9)	15.1 (59.2)	19.1 (66.4)	22.7 (72.9)	24.9 (76.8)	24.5 (76.1)	19.8 (67.6)	14.1 (57.4)	7.5 (45.5)	3.6 (38.5)	14.2 (57.6)
Daily mean °C (°F)	0.2 (32.4)	1.0 (33.8)	5.2 (41.4)	9.1 (48.4)	13.4 (56.1)	17.0 (62.6)	18.8 (65.8)	18.4 (65.1)	14.0 (57.2)	9.4 (48.9)	4.2 (39.6)	0.9 (33.6)	9.3 (48.7)
Mean daily minimum °C (°F)	−2.7 (27.1)	−2.8 (27.0)	0.2 (32.4)	3.2 (37.8)	7.4 (45.3)	11.0 (51.8)	12.6 (54.7)	12.6 (54.7)	8.7 (47.7)	5.2 (41.4)	1.1 (34.0)	−1.8 (28.8)	4.6 (40.3)
Average precipitation mm (inches)	71.9 (2.83)	55.7 (2.19)	55.1 (2.17)	57.1 (2.25)	76.6 (3.02)	75.7 (2.98)	79.0 (3.11)	71.0 (2.80)	53.2 (2.09)	65.0 (2.56)	63.3 (2.49)	81.9 (3.22)	805.5 (31.71)
Average snowfall cm (inches)	8.6 (3.4)	10.4 (4.1)	5.8 (2.3)	0.4 (0.2)	0.0 (0.0)	0.0 (0.0)	0.0 (0.0)	0.0 (0.0)	0.0 (0.0)	0.3 (0.1)	3.8 (1.5)	11.7 (4.6)	41.0 (16.1)
Average precipitation days (≥ 1.0 mm)	10.0	8.7	9.3	8.8	10.4	10.4	11.0	10.3	8.1	10.3	9.9	11.4	118.6
Average snowy days (≥ 1.0 cm)	4.0	3.5	1.9	0.3	0.0	0.0	0.0	0.0	0.0	0.1	1.2	3.5	14.5
Average relative humidity (%)	86	81	74	70	71	71	70	72	78	84	88	88	78
Source 1: NOAA
Source 2: MeteoSwiss

== Demographics ==
Hallau has a population (as of 2008) of 2,014, of which 15.0% are foreign nationals. Of the foreign population, (as of 2008), 31.9% are from Germany, 9.3% are from Italy, 7.3% are from Serbia, 33.2% are from Macedonia, and 18.3% are from another country. Over the last 10 years the population has decreased at a rate of -1.9%. Most of the population (as of 2000) speaks German (91.9%), with Albanian being second most common ( 3.3%) and Italian being third ( 1.7%).

The age distribution of the population (as of 2008) is children and teenagers (0–19 years old) make up 21.9% of the population, while adults (20–64 years old) make up 58.8% and seniors (over 64 years old) make up 19.3%.

In the 2007 federal election the most popular party was the SVP which received 52% of the vote. The next two most popular parties were the SP (27.4%), and the FDP (20.6%) .

The entire Swiss population is generally well educated. In Hallau about 81% of the population (between age 25–64) have completed either non-mandatory upper secondary education or additional higher education (either university or a Fachhochschule). In Hallau, as of 2007, 1.7% of the population attend kindergarten or another pre-school, 6.74% attend a Primary School, 4.35% attend a lower level Secondary School, and 2.7% attend a higher level Secondary School.

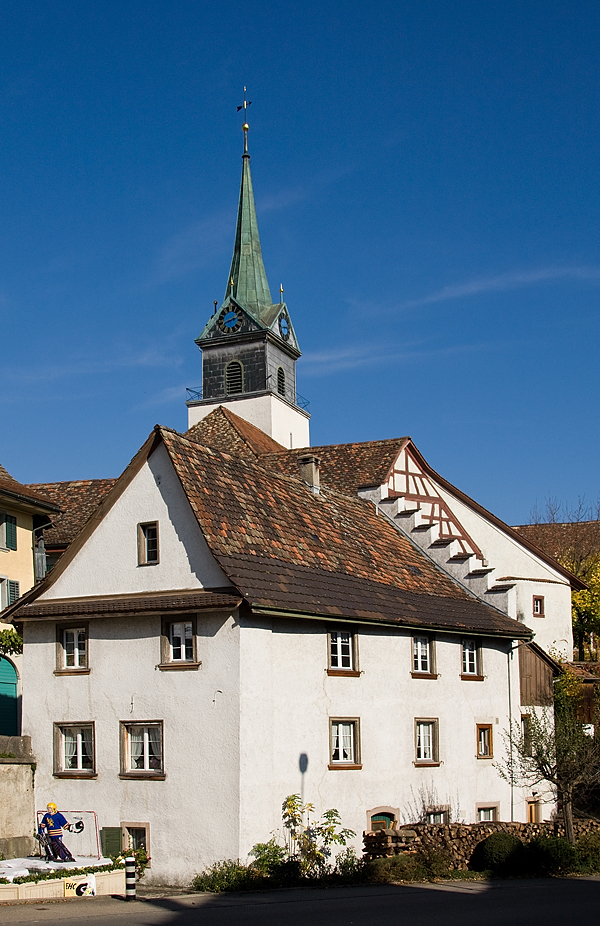
Village church in Hallau

As of 2000, 14.3% of the population belonged to the Roman Catholic Church and 67.9% belonged to the Swiss Reformed Church.

The historical population is given in the following table:

year	population
1531	120
1771	1,729
1850	2,607
1900	1,870
1910	1,764
1950	1,959
2000	2,008

== Heritage sites of national significance ==
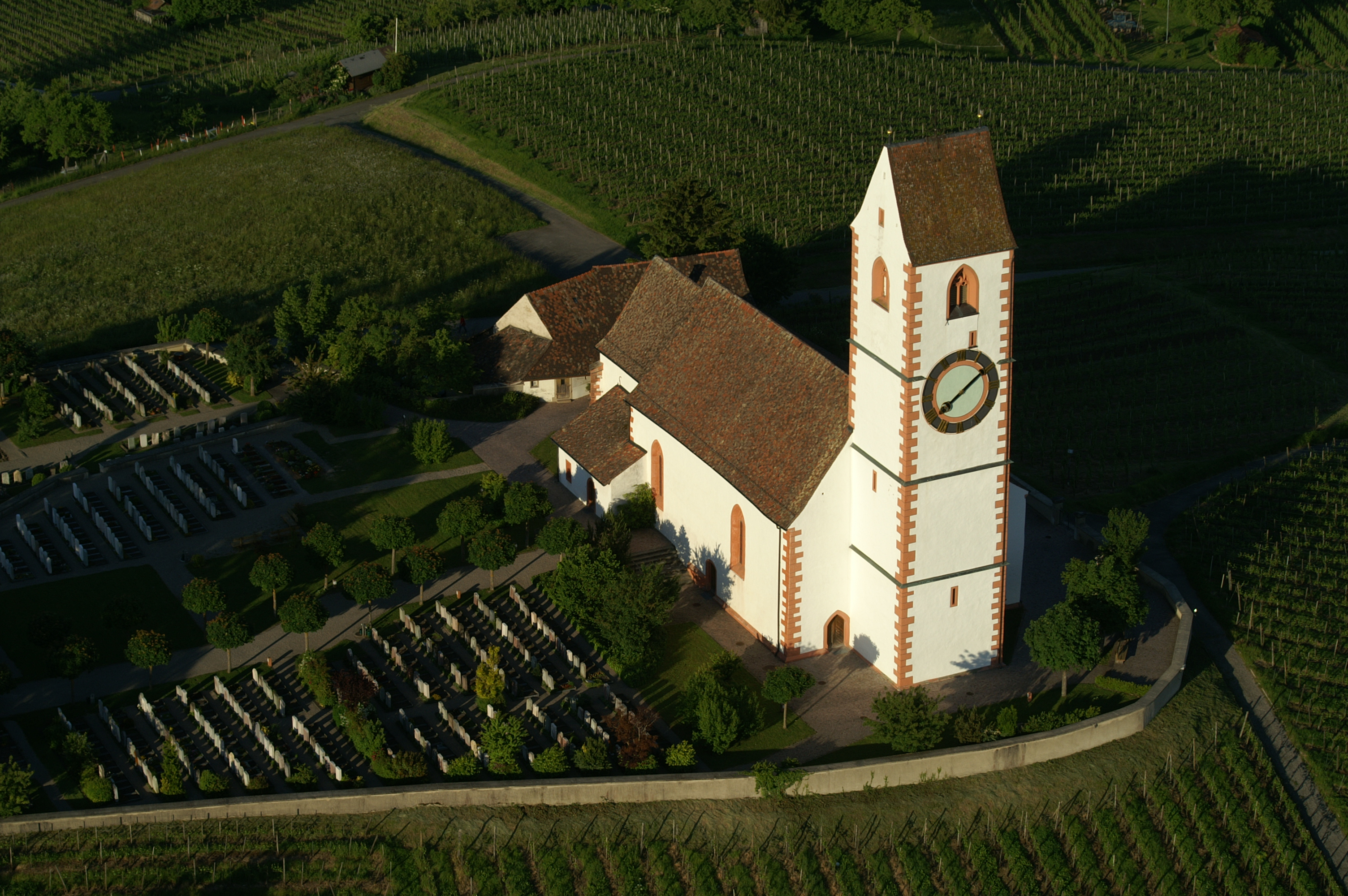
Bergkirche St. Moritz

The Bergkirche St. Moritz (mountain or hill church of St. Moritz) is listed as a Swiss heritage site of national significance. The church was built in 1491. Due to the number of old Alemanni graves and artifacts, the church was pilgrimage site until the Protestant Reformation. In 1505/08 the church became independent of the parish church of Neunkirch and became the parish of Unterhallau. The Church of St. Moritz became the new parish church.

Additionally, the entire village of Gächlingen is designated as part of the Inventory of Swiss Heritage Sites.

== Coat of arms ==
The blazon of the municipal coat of arms is Gules a Fleur de lis Argent between two Mullets Or in pale.

== Economy ==
Hallau has an unemployment rate of 0.96%. As of 2005, there were 240 people employed in the primary economic sector and about 69 businesses involved in this sector. 277 people are employed in the secondary sector and there are 35 businesses in this sector. 286 people are employed in the tertiary sector, with 69 businesses in this sector.

Aerial view from 400 m by Walter Mittelholzer (1923)

As of 2008 the mid year average unemployment rate was 1.1%. There were 100 non-agrarian businesses in the municipality and 48.1% of the (non-agrarian) population was involved in the secondary sector of the economy while 51.9% were involved in the third. At the same time, 63.1% of the working population was employed full-time, and 36.9% was employed part-time. There were 615 residents of the municipality who were employed in some capacity, of which females made up 48.9% of the workforce. As of 2000 there were 570 residents who worked in the municipality, while 451 residents worked outside Hallau and 240 people commuted into the municipality for work.

As of 2008, there are 5 restaurants, and 1 hotel with 14 beds. The hospitality industry in Hallau employs 14 people.

== Border crossings ==
Border crossings into Germany are located between Hallau town and Eberfingen; and between the village of Wunderklingen with Eggingen, both in Waldshut district in Baden-Württemberg state.
