= Eggingen =

- Municipality
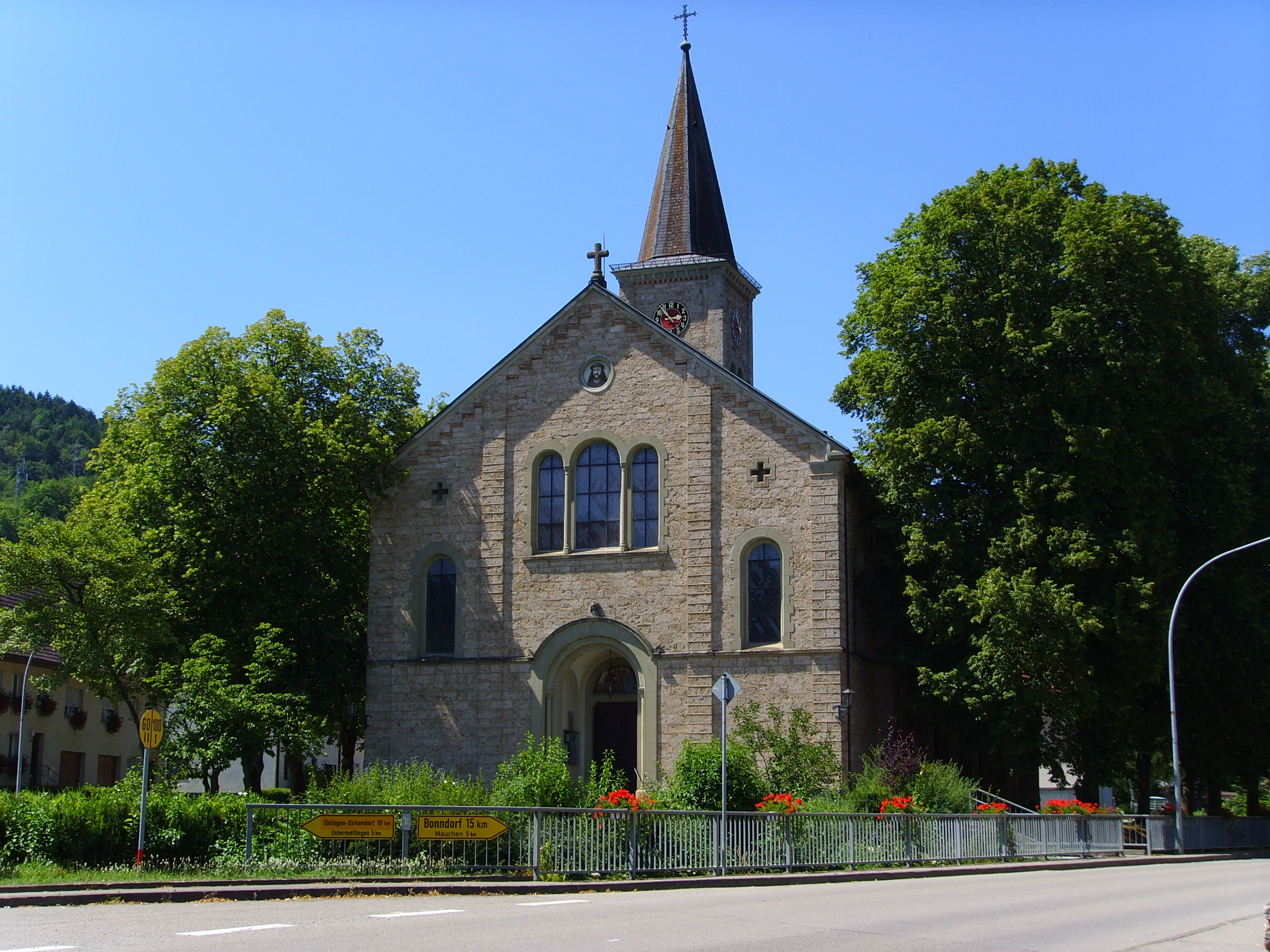

- Coat of arms

- Location of Eggingen within Waldshut district
- Interactive map of Eggingen
- Location within Germany Location within Baden-Württemberg
- Coordinates: 47°41′49″N 08°23′47″E
- Country: Germany
- State: Baden-Württemberg
- Admin. region: Freiburg
- District: Waldshut

Government
  - Mayor (2019–27): Karlheinz Gantert

Area
  - Total: 13.95 km^{2} (5.39 sq mi)
- Elevation: 459 m (1,506 ft)

Population (2025-12-31)
  - Total: 1,771
  - Density: 127.0/km^{2} (328.8/sq mi)
- Time zone: UTC+01:00 (CET)
  - Summer (DST): UTC+02:00 (CEST)
- Postal codes: 79805
- Dialling codes: 07746
- Vehicle registration: WT
- Website: www.eggingen.de

Eggingen (German pronunciation: [ˈɛɡɪŋən]) is a municipality in the district of Waldshut in Baden-Württemberg in Germany. There is an international border crossing to the village of Wunderklingen in the neighbouring canton of Schaffhausen in Switzerland.
