= Löhningen =

- Municipality
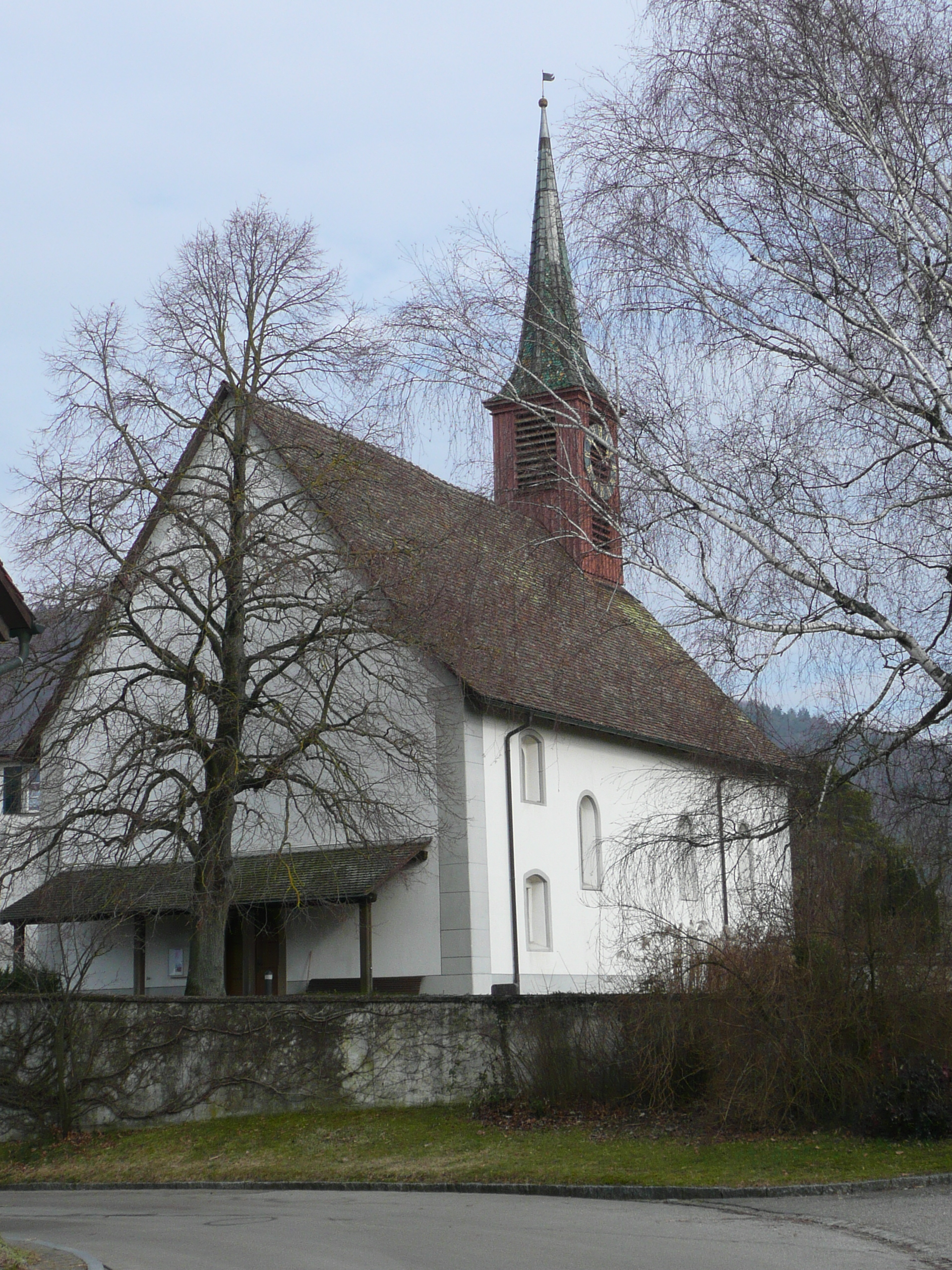

- Flag Coat of arms
- Location of Löhningen
- Location within Switzerland Location within Canton of Schaffhausen
- Coordinates: 47°42′N 8°32′E
- Country: Switzerland
- Canton: Schaffhausen
- District: n.a.

Area
  - Total: 6.83 km^{2} (2.64 sq mi)
- Elevation: 479 m (1,572 ft)

Population (February 2009)
  - Total: 1,188
  - Density: 174/km^{2} (450/sq mi)
- Time zone: UTC+01:00 (CET)
  - Summer (DST): UTC+02:00 (CEST)
- Postal code: 8224
- SFOS number: 2903
- ISO 3166 code: CH-SH
- Surrounded by: Beringen, Guntmadingen, Neunkirch, Siblingen
- Website: www.loehningen.ch

Löhningen (German pronunciation: [ˈløːnɪŋən]) is a municipality in the canton of Schaffhausen in Switzerland.

== History ==
Löhningen is first mentioned in 1112 as Loningen. An earlier reference, from about 778–781, to Loninga might refer to the village of Löhningen in Steinatal in Waldshut district in Germany.

== Coat of arms ==
The blazon of the municipal coat of arms is Per fess Gules a Trefoil slipped Vert and Sable two bends sinister of the second.

== Geography ==
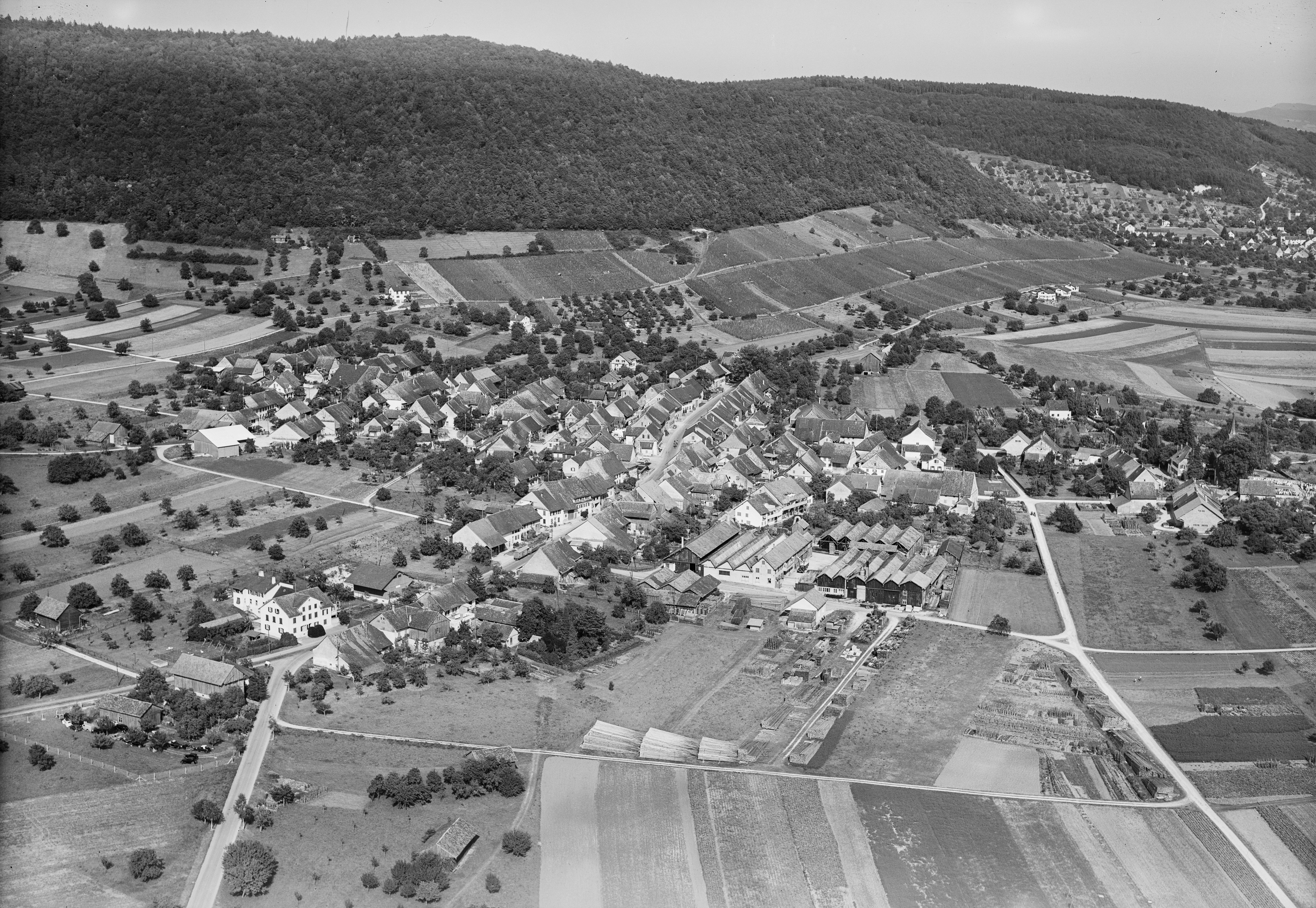
Aerial view (1953)

Löhningen has an area, as of 2006, of 6.9 km^{2} (2.7 sq mi). Of this area, 53.5% is used for agricultural purposes, while 38.1% is forested. Of the rest of the land, 8.3% is settled (buildings or roads) and the remainder (0.1%) is non-productive (rivers or lakes). The municipality is located in the Oberklettgau district. Löhningen shares a border with Beringen in the East, Guntmadingen in the South-East, Neunkirch in the South-West, Gächlingen in the West and Siblingen in the North-West. Children from Löhningen attend Secondary School in Beringen, Primary School and kindergarten in Löhningen itself. The municipality on the foot of the Randen range is surrounded by vineyards.

== Demographics ==
Löhningen has a population (as of 2008) of 1,213, of which 9.5% are foreign nationals. Of the foreign population, (as of 2008), 40.4% are from Germany, 6.4% are from Italy, 2.8% are from Croatia, 12.8% are from Serbia, and 37.6% are from another country. Over the last 10 years the population has grown at a rate of 4.5%. Most of the population (as of 2000) speaks German (95.7%), with Serbo-Croatian being second most common ( 1.3%) and French being third ( 0.6%).

The age distribution of the population (as of 2008) is children and teenagers (0–19 years old) make up 23% of the population, while adults (20–64 years old) make up 61% and seniors (over 64 years old) make up 16%.

In the 2007 federal election the most popular party was the SVP which received 48.2% of the vote. The next two most popular parties were the SP (27%), and the FDP (24.8%) .

The entire Swiss population is generally well educated. In Löhningen about 85.2% of the population (between age 25–64) have completed either non-mandatory upper secondary education or additional higher education (either university or a Fachhochschule). In Löhningen, as of 2007, 2.4% of the population attend kindergarten or another pre-school, 7.21% attend a Primary School, 4.12% attend a lower level Secondary School, and 3.52% attend a higher level Secondary School.

As of 2000, 16% of the population belonged to the Roman Catholic Church and 69.9% belonged to the Swiss Reformed Church.

The historical population is given in the following table:

year	population
1771	444
1798	500
1850	845
1900	699
1950	709
1980	748
2000	1,127

== Economy ==
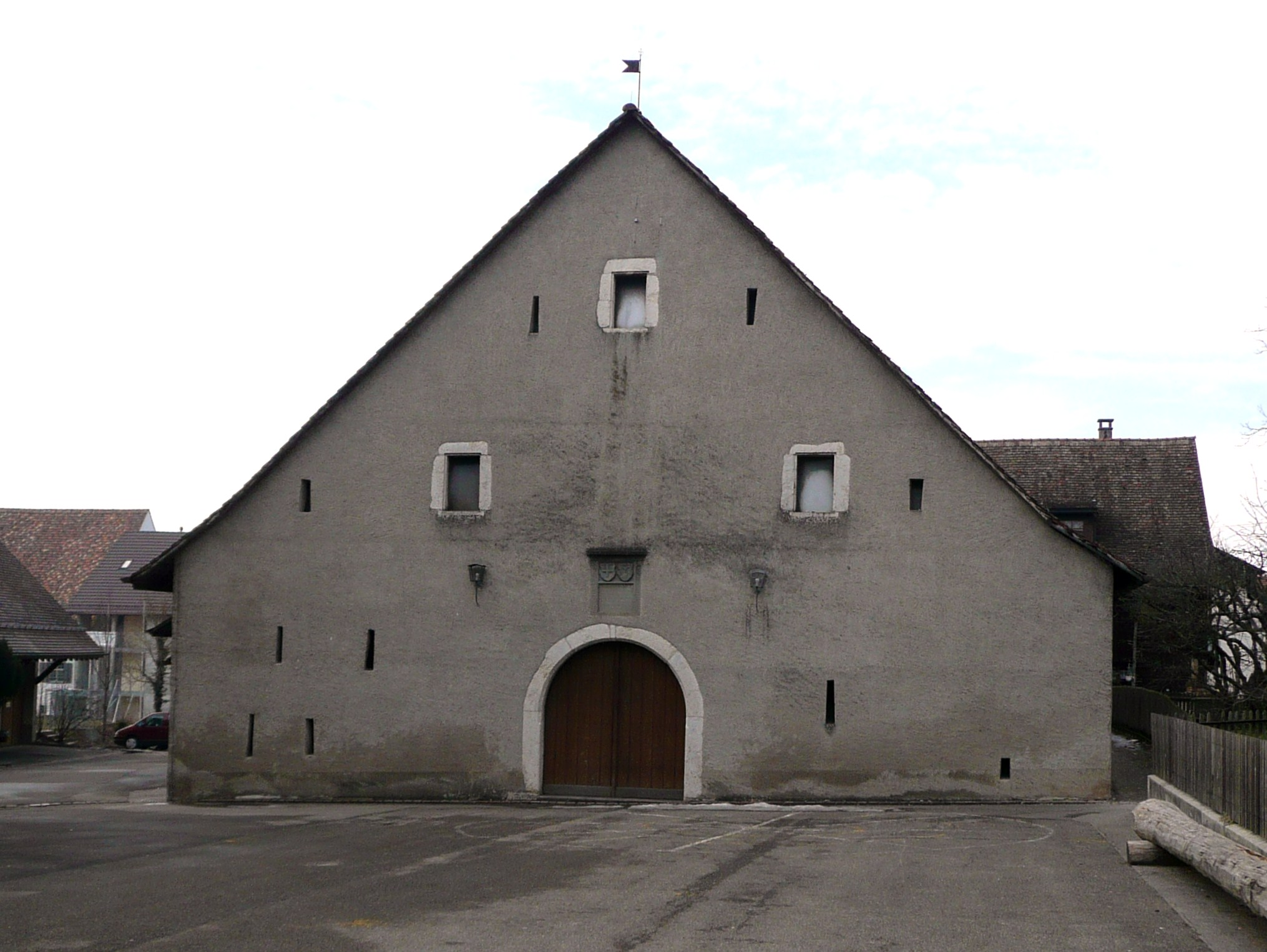
Hospital wine press building in Löhningen

Löhningen has an unemployment rate of 1.5%. As of 2005, there were 46 people employed in the primary economic sector and about 17 businesses involved in this sector. 80 people are employed in the secondary sector and there are 14 businesses in this sector. 69 people are employed in the tertiary sector, with 28 businesses in this sector.

As of 2008 the mid year average unemployment rate was 1.6%. There were 46 non-agrarian businesses in the municipality and 52.7% of the (non-agrarian) population was involved in the secondary sector of the economy while 47.3% were involved in the third. At the same time, 67.7% of the working population was employed full-time, and 32.3% was employed part-time. There were 167 residents of the municipality who were employed in some capacity, of which females made up 33.5% of the workforce. As of 2000 there were 131 residents who worked in the municipality, while 446 residents worked outside Löhningen and 74 people commuted into the municipality for work.
