= Beringen, Switzerland =

Beringen
- Municipality
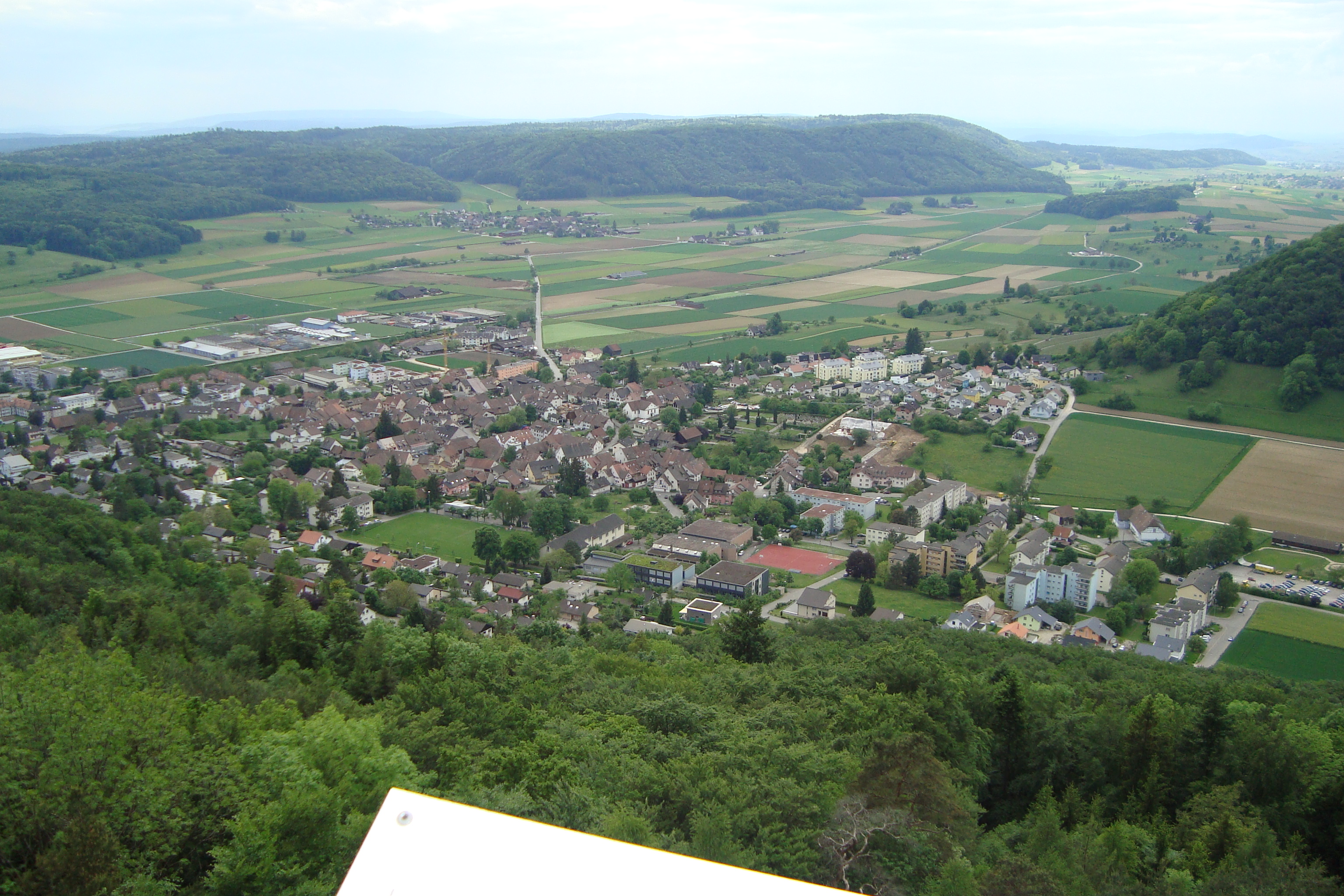

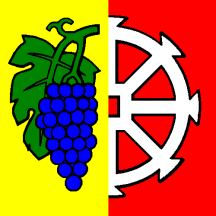
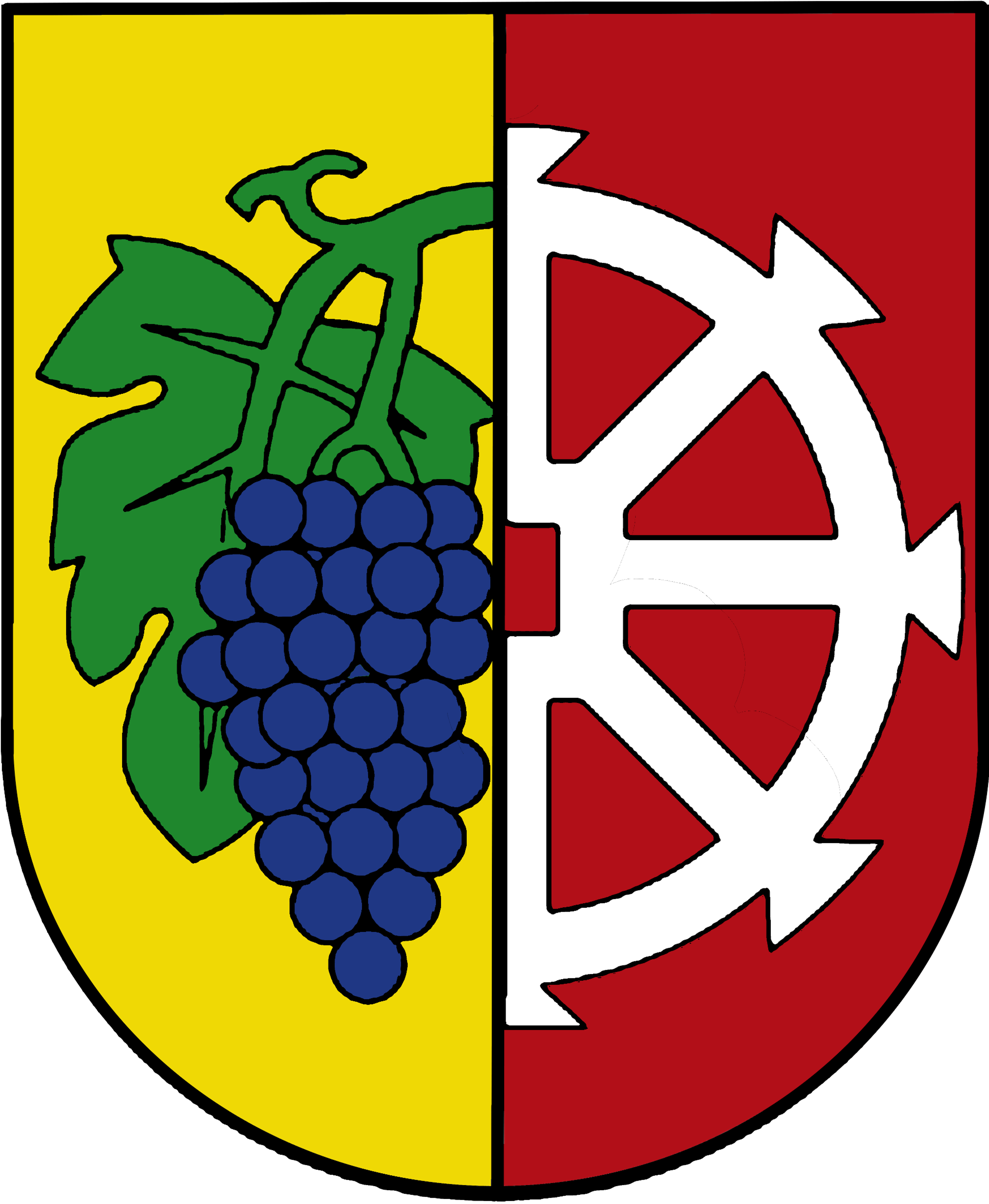
- Flag Coat of arms
- Location of Beringen
- Location within Switzerland Location within Canton of Schaffhausen
- Coordinates: 47°41′N 8°34′E
- Country: Switzerland
- Canton: Schaffhausen
- District: n.a.

Area
  - Total: 14.19 km^{2} (5.48 sq mi)
- Elevation: 456 m (1,496 ft)

Population (December 2008)
  - Total: 3,375
  - Density: 237.8/km^{2} (616.0/sq mi)
- Time zone: UTC+01:00 (CET)
  - Summer (DST): UTC+02:00 (CEST)
- Postal code: 8222
- SFOS number: 2932
- ISO 3166 code: CH-SH
- Surrounded by: Hemmental, Löhningen, Neuhausen am Rheinfall, Schaffhausen, Siblingen
- Website: beringen.ch

Beringen (German pronunciation: [ˈbeːʁɪŋən]; High Alemannic: Beringe) is a municipality in the canton of Schaffhausen in Switzerland. On 1 January 2013 the municipality of Guntmadingen merged into the municipality of Beringen.

== History ==
Aerial view (1950)

Switzerland's history and Beringen's as well is linked back to the Ice Age and Stone Age. But, more specifically beginning with The Helvetians, a Celtic tribe, give their name to the Swiss territory: hence HELVETIA on Swiss flags, coins and stamps, ch = Confoederatio Helvetica on cars and internet domains.

This is where the story and timeline of not only Swiss history but that of Berginen really begins, around 800–58 B.C.

=== Bronze Age ===
In the Eschheimer Valley near Beringen, a gravesite had been discovered that is believed to reach back to the early Bronze Age. Several feet below the surface and covered by a layer of rocks, a skeleton was discovered, along with a bronze ax with a blade and dagger, as well as a decorative needle, a piece of wire, and several bronze nails. This grave was typical for the burial customs of the early Bronze Age.

=== Roman period ===
There is good evidence that a "Hof" (cluster of buildings) in the Lieblosen-Valley dates back to the time when the Romans governed the territory, as can be seen by an ancient supporting wall embracing the living quarters and two economy buildings.

"When the Celtic Helvetians attempted to move south from Switzerland to Southern France they were stopped by the Roman commander and subsequent emperor C. Julius Cesar in 58 B.C. They were forced to return to Switzerland. The Romans controlled Switzerland's territory until about A.D. 400. Roman military camps and forts were erected at the northern Rhine frontier..."

A spectacular find was discovered when a military tile was unearthed showing the imprint of the 11th and 21st legion as well as the 26th cohort, indicating the presence of a corps of volunteers made up of Roman citizens.

Similar tiles have been found in Doroni-Hof in Beringen.

=== Growth ===
Beringen grew up along the creek that now runs through the village. The water drove mills in Beringen, such as the flour mill (no longer in operation), the gypsum mill (replaced by homes), and the so-called Oele (now the site of the municipal swimming pool). Water was needed for the dye-shops in the former Doktorhaus (house for Doctors, now a business establishment). Along the banks of the town creek, people washed everything, including pails, troughs, and related objects. The creek also served as drinking water for livestock, and was the only help in case of a fire.

Naturally, the first settlers established themselves close to the creek, one house next to the other. Two rows of houses formed the original village. When fire consumed one of the houses, it was not replaced; instead, a building for public use was erected. This made it possible that six or more households could be supplied with water instead of only one or two. The best and best-preserved example of this is the Leunhof, a well-known restaurant. Others are the Huggehof, Chloesteril, Kellerhof, Vogelhof, and Paradieserhof, Prinzenhof, and the Winkel. The Chelhof stands close to the church and far away from the creek, next to the well.

Today, Beringen's creek is now covered over. Water is supplied through an extensive system of pipes, large blocks for apartments and businesses have been erected, new buildings with small industries, and there are only a few agricultural buildings and outfits existing.

=== Built heritage ===
There many notable old building that still exist in Beringen:

- The Church of Beringen

One does not know the Patron Saint of this church, for sure. Possibly it can be Saint George who appears in an ancient coat of arms of Beringen. In a Chronicle of the historian, Rueger is a reference to a church in Beringen from the year 1061, but there is no official record until the year 1231. In 1580, an addition was built at the west end, and in 1642 an addition was constructed at the east end. In 1645, a tower was added, including a clock. New bells replaced the four old bells in 1906 and five years later an organ was installed. Two further renovations took place in 1965 and 1991. Residents continue to enjoy the steeple and sun clock.

- The Parsonage of Beringen

The old residence of the village parson, across the street from the Huenen Castle, continues to serve as the center of the church congregation. Extensive remodeling and restoration has taken place over the years. A historic chestnut tree that once adorned the premises was taken down in 1955, due to the realignment of the street.

- Castle of the Huenen of Beringen Family (circa 13th century)

The Huenen of Beringen family were aristocrats who built the Castles during the 13th century, and enlarged it in succeeding centuries. There is a drawing with a "Legende" or legend which indicates various parts were built and added in the 13th, 16th, 17th, 18th, 19th, and 20th centuries.

Through the initiative of the Improvement Society for the castle of Beringen (today it's called the Beringen Castle Foundation), the entire castle was extensively restored so that various rooms and facilities have been used for the Museum of Beringen for historical folklore purposes, since 1989. The collection consists of items from the regions of Beringen, Guntmadingen, and Loehningen, and is an attraction in the village.

- The Peradise-Estate (Monastery)

The monastery "Paradice", intent on enlarging its possessions, purchased in 1289 several parcels of land in Beringen. On 11 July 1291, Heinrich Ritter, a citizen of Schaffhausen, sold a large estate, called the "Kehlhof", to the monastery. Five years later, on 20 December 1296, Heinrich, the Pastor of Zurzach and Merishausen and his brother, Ulrich of Schaffhausen sold another estate in Beringen, "The Bonstetten", to the same Monastery.

The monastery was operated by nuns and within a few decades they managed to possess considerable acreage in Beringen. When Beringen was settled, the houses that had been built on these properties were called "Paradieserhof".

- The MunggeHof

A "Hof" consists of buildings, usually a dwelling, barn, livestock sheds and a shop. Hofs groupings were almost little worlds onto themselves.

The word, "Mungge" is the dialect term of "Moench", or the English equivalent Monks". Others are the VogelHof, the Chehlhof, the Paradise-Hof and the Cellar-Hof, all of which are witnesses of the years when the monasteries owned and controlled large tracts of land and real estate, such as the Munggehoff.

The Munggehof served the community well, it was here where on the last Sunday of April that the annual "Beringer-Chilbi", or community folk festival was held. One of its features was a riding circle standing in the center of the square, while fringe fruits, bakery items, and other goodies were sold. Eventually, the square was too small for these festivals which are now held on the Fire-Square.

- The VogelHof

The Vegelhof was one of the oldest parts of the village, and the houses were built very tightly together, the roofs extended far towards the front as protection against rain and sun. The entrances into the cellars were on the front side of the buildings, and wide stairways lead into the second floor of each house.

Vogel was the name of one of the families living there. Coopers, furniture builders, and stonemasons were established here. The last survivors of the Vogel family died in 1978.

- The Lions Inn (before 1711)

In Switzerland, many restaurants and hotels carry the name of an animal for identification ( examples: Lion, Bear, Eagle, etc.) Beringen's most famous restaurant was the "Lion". It was first named in a historical record of 1711. Called a tavern or inn, the owner was obliged to affix to the building a very elaborate sign made of cast iron, depicting a lion.

The "Lion" served as the seat for the "Society of Boys" of Beringen. Such societies have existed since the 15th century. The one headquartered in the "Lion" is the only one existing in the Canton of Shauffhausen. This building is a large three story building which sits on a corner. Its front is decorated with ornate words and scrolled imagery along with an image of a lion and keeper. This image spans the entire front of the building, between the second and third floors.

In 1845, another organization was founded in the "Lion", an association of artisans and tradesmen, the "Gewerbeverein" It was the first association ever organized in Beringen. Its name was later changed to "Reading Society" (Leseverein), but was dissolved in 1960. Although the building was still standing in 2004, it was being used for apartments and a beauty salon, the restaurant and inn facilities were abandoned in the 1930s. The large Lion sign has been saved and adorns the staircase of the new and more modern community center "Zelg"

- The Old School House (c. 1739)

The school house was built in 1826, and renovated in 1965. The square on which it stands was owned by the Monastery "Allerheiligen" (All Saints) which intended to initially be built as a barn to collect tithing. However, due to political and ecumenical changes, the barn was never built.

The original school house was built in 1739, however, there are no plans or pictures that remain to show its size or appearance. It was destroyed by fire in 1824, after it had served the village for 85 years. The first teacher was Hansjakob Huser, who served from 1608 to 1645.

The children from the neighboring village of Neuhausen, those in higher grades, attended school at the Beringen school house. At the time, Neuhausen was merely a small village of fishers and teamsters, and had no rooms for the higher grades.

By May 1949 a new school house was built-the third one; and it was dedicated to Zimmerberg, but 40 years later, it was already too small and a larger structure was in the planning stages. Because of the sharp increase in the student population, many were schooled in the old school house.

- The Old Flour Mill (c. 1536)

The mill building is several hundred years old. It lies at the upper end of the village. Historically, it was first described in 1536; it belonged to the community as a whole and was leased back to some of the burghers every few years. Repairs and renovations took place in 1843 for the house, 1842 for the mill, and 1841 for the barn. The mill ceased operation decades ago, but the building is still used as a dwelling. Above the main door is the following engraved verse:

       I mill my flour for everyone,
       Good bread awaits him who can bake.
       But, there is no miller in all the world 
       who can mill to satisfy everyone.

- Der "Gipsmuehle" – The Gypsum Mill

This mill was owned for many generations by the Boll family. The water wheel was six meters (18 feet) high. The gypsum came from the nearby town of Schleitheim and was hauled first by a wagon with six horses, and then later by streetcars. When the material was unloaded in front of the mill, it was first burned in kilns seven feet high; the heavy smoke rose from many holes because it was impossible to build a chimney. The next process was to break the burned gypsum up into small pieces, and then to transfer it into the mill.

As long as the water was plentiful, the mill ran 24 hours a day. in 1900, 50 kilo of gypsum cost 70 cents; the price went up to four times as much by 1949. By this time, the mill suffered from old age; repairs and remodeling would have cost to much, and so its operation ceased. Today, it has been replaced by several apartment buildings.

- The "Old" Post House

Five or more generations ago, this building housed a bakery and restaurant as well as a post office. Every midnight, the postal coach would enter the village, coming from the distant town of Freiburg in Breisgau. Long before the coachman approached the Old Post House, he would sound his horn to alert the postmaster to bring his bag of mail out on the street, because the postal coach did not stop.

The first collection of mail took place in 1846, by a private contractor. Four years later, the mail service was federalized, and in 1862 Beringen received an official post office. In 1874, a telegraph unit was installed, and in 1946 the postal facilities were transferred to a larger building. In 1976, spacious offices were acquired in the community center, "Zelg".

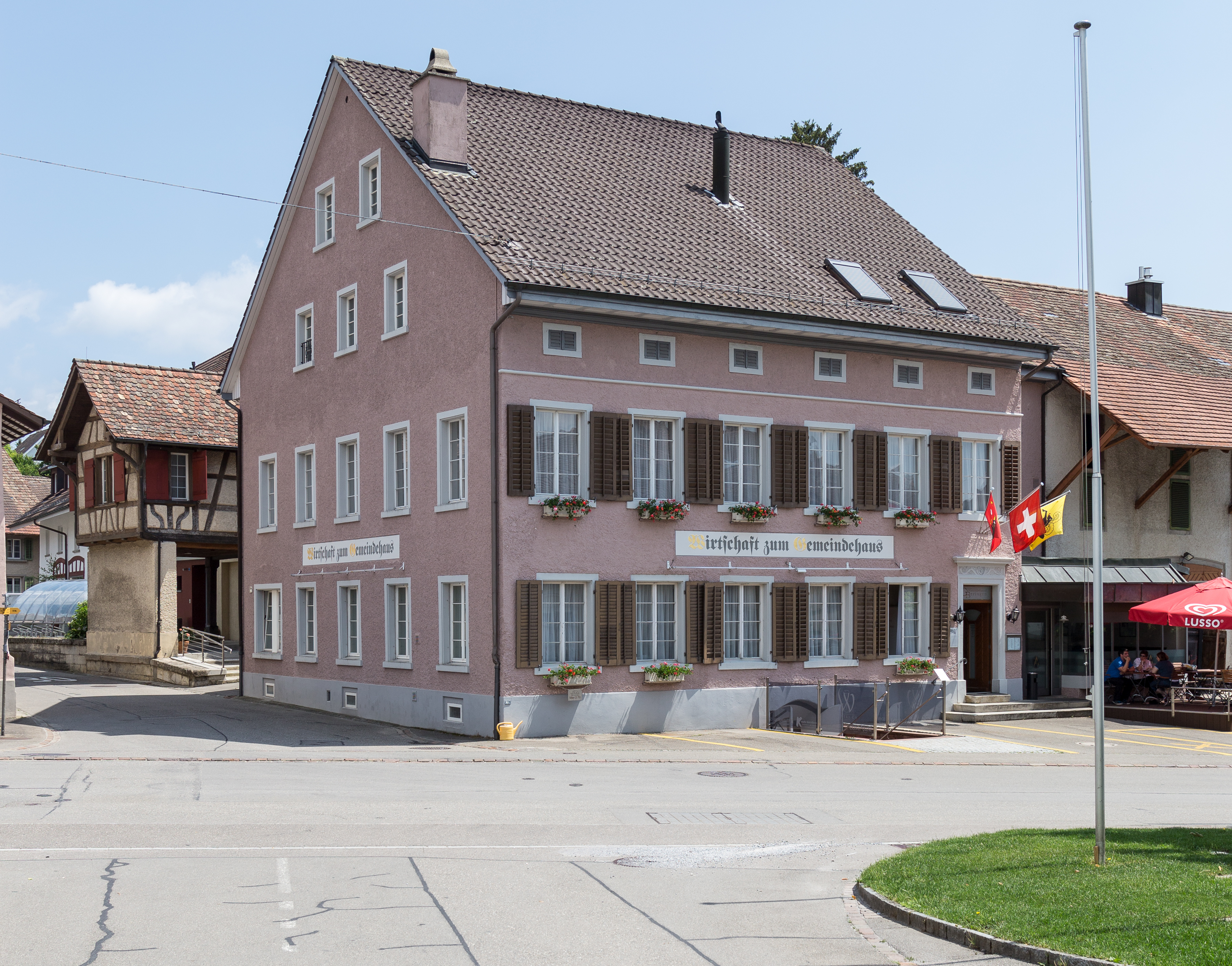
Wirtschaft zum Gemeindehaus

- Gemeindehaus Restaurant (Community House )

In December 1862 Johannes Schneider submitted to the meeting of the citizens a plan to build a public hall that would serve 300 people on tables. The hall was to be heated and complemented with additional rooms. As compensation, he expected not to have to pay any annual license fees for twenty years.

The answer of the village council was as follows: 1. Permission would be granted, but a guard's room had to be added, and the premises needed to be used by the village council to house soldiers.

2. Construction would have to be supervised by the village council.

3. The council would pay for an annual fee of fifty francs (about $12.00) for lighting and heating.

4. The owner would be exempt from paying the annual fees for the first twenty years.

5. The building had to be built during the year 1863.

In near recent years some of the rooms have been remodeled into additional dining facilities, a bakery shop, coffee shop, and a small garden with a garden restaurant.

- The Eagle-House

This stately building was built in 1863, and was noted for its large roof. Along with several similar structures along the same route, the "Schaffer-hauser Street" was/is typical of the buildings built during the time when the first railroads were constructed. Among them was the Baumgarten-House, which was an exact duplication of the Eagle-House.

After serving for more than 100 years, the Eagle-House was torn down in 1966, to make room for a super market. This was a rather unattractive building, and was nicknamed the "shoebox" by the local people. It was demolished after only 23 years, and the site is now occupied by a shopping center.

- The Dalcher-Hueseli

The Dalcher-Huesli is reminiscent of rural architecture in Beringen. "Huesli" is an endearing name for a small house, which normally had a barn with livestock stalls on the ground floor, and an apartment on the second floor for the servants. Behind the barn would be the living quarters for the owners. Unfortunately, the last Dalcher-Huesli was torn down to make room for a Kiosk and facilities for the public street car system (1964, a new public streetcar company (ASS) starts operation on 1 October, replacing the old system of 19050.

=== Historical timeline ===
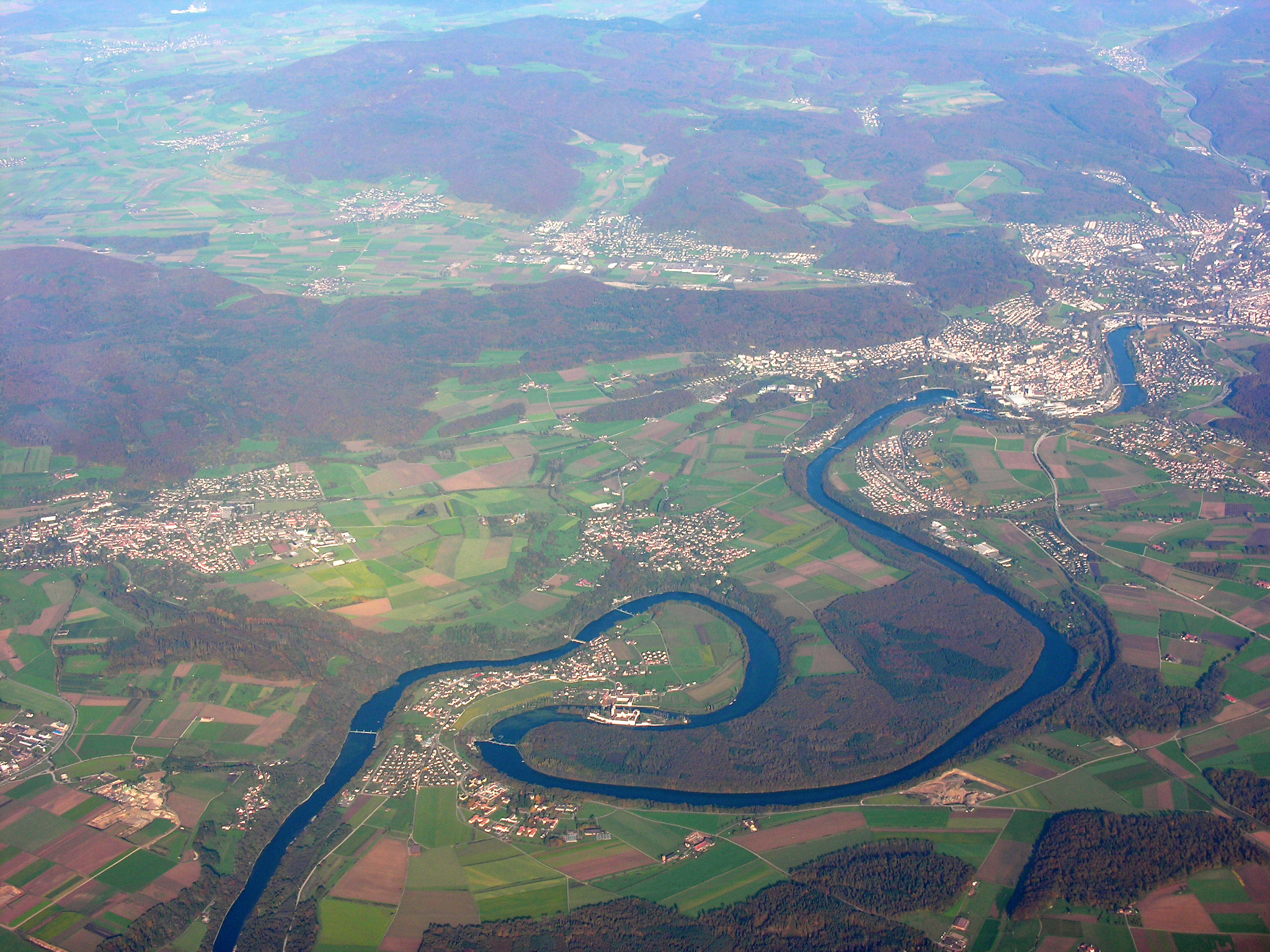
Aerial view with surrounding villages and the Rhine. Beringen is located in the center of the top part of the photograph

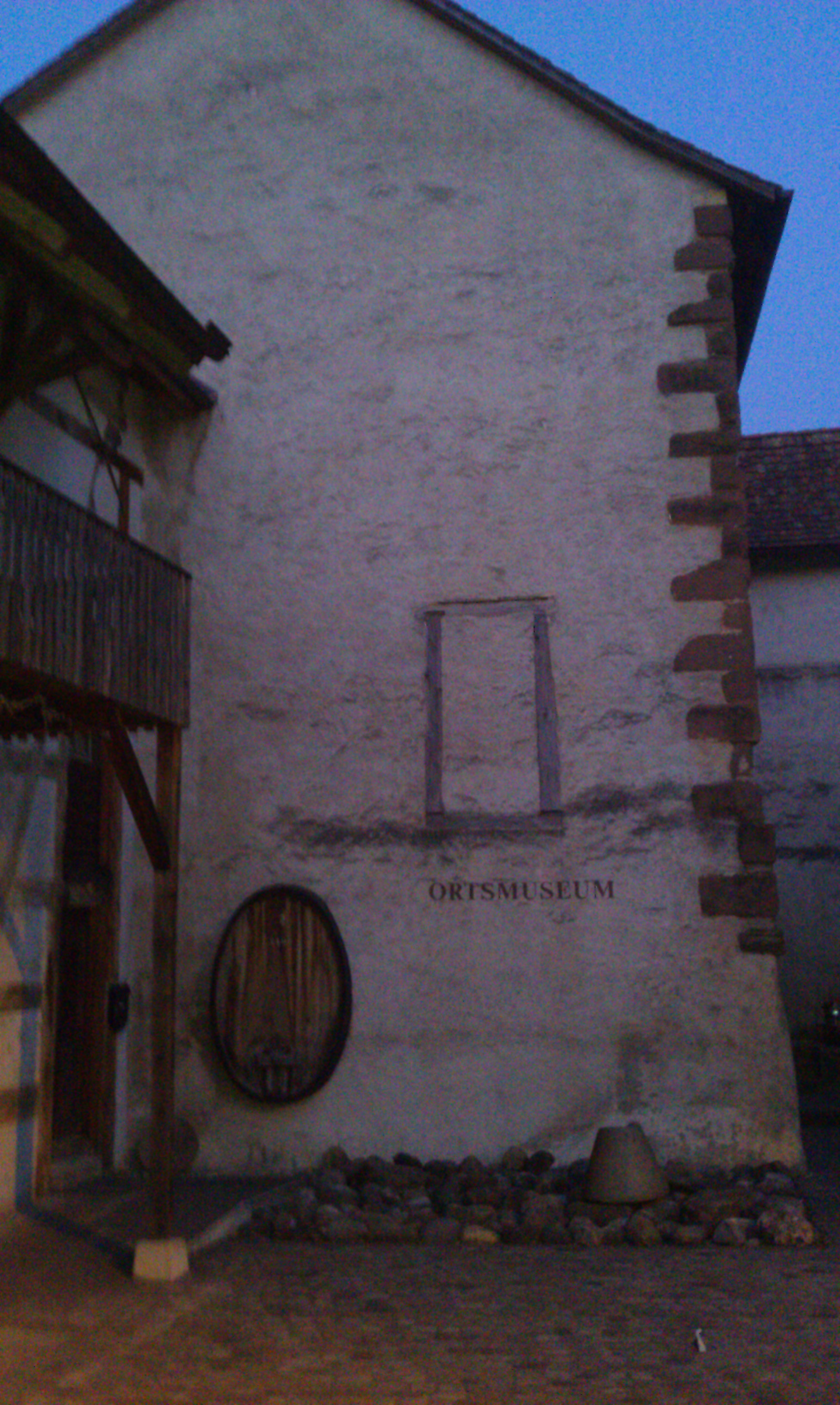
Village museum

Prior to 965 AD refer to the chronological Swiss History noted on page three noted in Major Genealogical Sources in Switzerland, Their Availability and Practical Use, written By Prof. Dr. C.H. Peyer.

58 B.C.: Caesar defeats the Helvetii at Bibracte: the beginning of Roman rule. ca. A.D. 260: The Germanic Alemanni destroy the city of Aventicum. ca. A.D. 500: Alemannian settlement begins", in the shadow of Frankish power. ca. A.D. 600: The Christian mission of St. Columbanus: the monks of St. Gallen. A.D. 800: Charlemagne, King of the Franks, crowned in Rome by Pope Leo III; Switzerland under the Holy Roman Empire.

965 AD: The first mentioning of Peringen known to be in existence, from the Oehninger Chronicles, though the document is considered to be a 12th Century forgery.

1090 AD – Bartholdes de Berinin: witness in a trade involving Beringen.

1102-1112 AD – First mentioning of a Chono de Beringen in a Charter.

1150 AD – Lutfridus and Guntherrus de Beringen-witnesses in a legal dispute between St. Blasien and Allerheiligen involving Mount Staufen.

1568 AD – Beginning of ore excavation on the Laufenberg (Mount Laufen) until the year 1850. Note: blast furnace located at Jestetten, and 1614 near the Rhine Falls.

1835 AD – Election of the first village of Town Council.

1863 AD – The Railway of the Archduke of Baden begins operating. The first locomotive ran on 12 December 1862 from Neuhausen to Waldshut.

1893 AD – Street lighting installed in Beringen.

1897 AD – Introduction of ballot boxes is approved by the Cantonal Chancellery of Schafhausen.

1905 AD – The public street car system begins operations.

1950 AD – Ewald Rahm installs a private historical museum on the upper floor of Schlachthuesli (sort of a butchers building). The public water supply system is with the city of Neuhausen.

1962 AD – The Swiss Industrial Society (SIG Schweizerische Industrie Gesell-schaft) builds a factory for wrapping machinery in Beringen. Max Bircher, mechanical engineer, moves from Schaffhausen to Beringen into the new factor building.

1963 AD – Bachmann and Company, builders of cranes, opens a factory in Beringen.

1964 AD – A new public streetcar company (ASS) starts operation on 1 October, replacing the old system of 1905.

1965 AD – A 100th Anniversary celebration of Beringen.

1967 AD – Consecration of the Catholic Church at Shauffhausen-Street.

1969 AD – Consecration of the new municipal swimming pool

1976 AD – Dedication of the Village Center "Zelg" with new city offices, post office, Savings and Loan Bank, and Fire Department. Ewald Rahm donates his entire historical collection to the community and is given a room in the new village center.

1977 AD – First International Festival of Beringen.

1979 AD – Purchase of Nature Preserve "Faerberwiesli" by the village council.

1984 AD – Dedication of "Zimmerberg" multi-purpose center.

1990 AD – Decation of the new Co-op Center

2017AD Newsletter with Current Information

=== Historic families and people ===
Alphabetically Listed, the following names were derived from a heraldic layout (1957), showing the coast of arms of the village of Beringen and fifteen of the oldest and most prominent families who have lived in Beringen for Centuries.

- Bolli
- Bollinger
- Hauser
- Hug
- Keller
- Lang
- Rohrbasser
- Roost
- Zimmler
- Schlatter
- Schneider
- Schwyn
- Tanner
- Wolf
- Zoller

Of these families, the clan of the Bollingers, also often called Bolliger, dates in Switzerland to the time of the settlement by Allemanic (Germanic) tribes between the 5th and 7th century. In linguistic research the name "Bollo" designates the family name, while the ending "ingen" means children or people. The Bollinger were thus the children, or kin "of the Bollo". Other surnames were similarly formed, such as Zähringer, Merowinger, Zollinger, etc. In those times members of the Bollinger settled in different parts of today's Switzerland, such as Beringen, Canton Schaffhausen and some areas of Canton Aargau, the name often appearing as Bolliger. In the villages of Bolligen, Canton Bern and Bollingen at the upper part of Lake Zurich it led to the naming of these settlements. There now appears to be evidence of the family name dating back to 1362 with notification of the "Sale of a Bollinger Farm: Buwet 1362". The first document about the Bollingers dates from 1362. The Turbenthal church books only start in 1529. The data for the Chronic of the Bollinger of Neubrunn for the time from 1362 to 1529 was gathered from the archives in of the Monastery of St. Gallen, tax rolls of the town of Zurich, tax books and other sources to show who lived, and when, in Neubrunn. For details see Ancestry Data – Links 'Beitrag zur Geschichte der Bollinger von Neubrunn und den 4 Orten Bollingen" or use the following link:

== Geography ==
As of 2006, Beringen had an area of 18.68 km^{2} (7.21 sq mi). Of this area, 28.6% is used for agricultural purposes, while 59.8% is forested. Of the rest of the land, 11.3% is settled (buildings or roads) and the remainder (0.2%) is non-productive (rivers, glaciers or mountains).

The municipality is located in the Schaffhausen district. It consists of the linear village of Beringen on the south base of the Randen range in the upper Klettgau. Today it is mostly an industrial municipality.

== Transport ==
Beringen has two railway stations, Beringen Badischer Bahnhof and Beringerfeld.

== Demographics ==
Beringen has a population (as of 2008) of 3,375, of which 16.3% are foreign nationals. Of the foreign population, (as of 2008), 39.3% are from Germany, 22.9% are from Italy, 2.7% are from Croatia, 12.6% are from Serbia, 1.5% are from Macedonia, 0.5% are from Turkey, and 20.5% are from another country. Over the last 10 years the population has grown at a rate of 11.2%. Most of the population (as of 2000) speaks German (93.6%), with Italian being second-most common ( 1.9%) and Serbo-Croatian being third ( 1.0%).

The age distribution of the population (as of 2008) is children and teenagers (0–19 years old) make up 20.5% of the population, while adults (20–64 years old) make up 60.1%, and seniors (over 64 years old) make up 19.3%.

In the 2007 federal election the most popular party was the SVP which received 38.6% of the vote. The next two most popular parties were the SP (31.9%), and the FDP (29.5%) .

The entire Swiss population is generally well educated. In Beringen about 81.2% of the population (between age 25–64) have completed either non-mandatory upper secondary education or additional higher education (either university or a Fachhochschule). In Beringen, as of 2007, 1.99% of the population is attending kindergarten or another pre-school, 7.43% are attending a Primary School, 3.59% attend a lower level Secondary School, and 2.84% attend a higher level Secondary School.

As of 2000, 23.3% of the population belonged to the Roman Catholic Church and 58.1% belonged to the Swiss Reformed Church.

The historical population is given in the following table:

year	population
1531	43 Households
1771	702
1850	1,418
1900	1,208
1950	1,757
2000	3,027
2011	3,538

== Industry ==
Beringen has an unemployment rate of 1.27%. As of 2005, there were 37 people employed in the primary economic sector and about 13 businesses involved in this sector. 1,194 people are employed in the secondary sector and there are 48 businesses in this sector. 540 people are employed in the tertiary sector, with 105 businesses in this sector.

As of 2008 the mid year average unemployment rate was 1.7%. There were 151 non-agrarian businesses in the municipality and 69% of the (non-agrarian) population was involved in the secondary sector of the economy while 31% were involved in the third. At the same time, 83.3% of the working population was employed full-time, and 16.7% was employed part-time. There were 2009 residents of the municipality were employed in some capacity, of which females made up 32.9% of the workforce. As of 2000 there were 426 residents who worked in the municipality, while 1109 residents worked outside Beringen and 1179 people commuted into the municipality for work.

As of 2008, there are 6 restaurants, and 1 hotel with 51 beds. The hospitality industry in Beringen employs 32 people.

== Other Resource References ==
- Ewald Rahm, History of the Canton of Schaffhausen, 1901, p. 37 & 45
- Hans Wäschle, Beringen Switzerland.
- “Beringen, A Village in the Canton of Schaffhausen in Northeastern Switzerland”. An English Translation of the Brochure “Beringen”, 24 pages, printed in 1991. Translation provided by Jared Looser, Salt Lake City, Utah 84103.
- Edith M. Faulstich, "Why I Chose A Swiss Grandfather", 1945, [Story]Edith Faulstich_Fisher: Why I Chose A Swiss Grandfather,
  * Alice M. Fisher-Granddaughter of Edith M. Faulstich/Fisher-> A Vanderpoel/Bollinger descendant of the Conrad Bollinger Family from Beringen, Switzerland and author of The Siberian Sojourn, Our Forgotten American Expeditionary Forces (AEF), 12 June 1972, American Expeditionary Force in Siberia during World War I,
