= Siblingen =

- Municipality
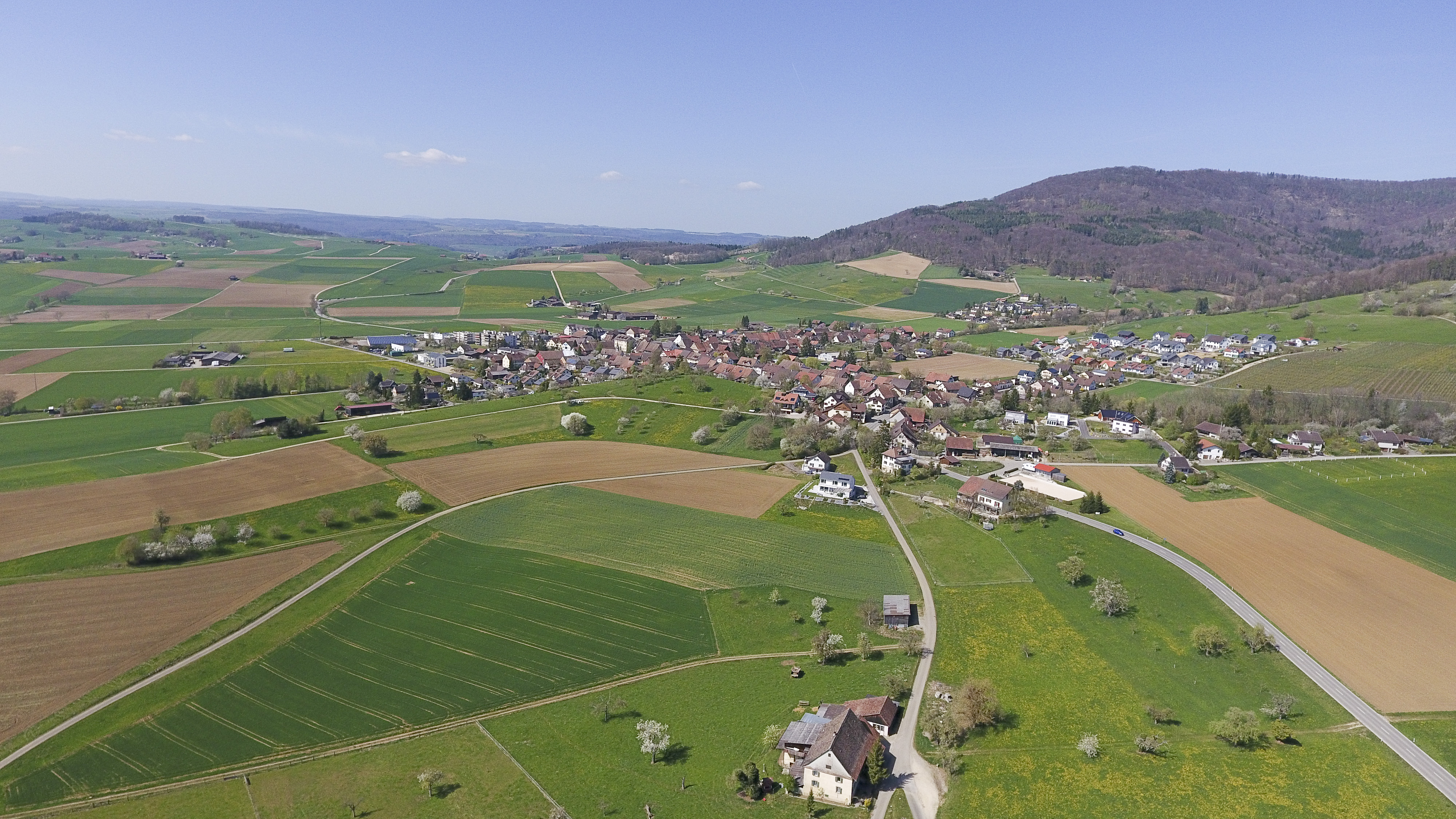

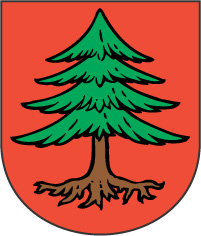
- Coat of arms
- Location of Siblingen
- Location within Switzerland Location within Canton of Schaffhausen
- Coordinates: 47°42′N 8°31′E
- Country: Switzerland
- Canton: Schaffhausen
- District: n.a.

Area
  - Total: 9.42 km^{2} (3.64 sq mi)
- Elevation: 508 m (1,667 ft)

Population (February 2009)
  - Total: 750
  - Density: 80/km^{2} (210/sq mi)
- Time zone: UTC+01:00 (CET)
  - Summer (DST): UTC+02:00 (CEST)
- Postal code: 8225
- SFOS number: 2953
- ISO 3166 code: CH-SH
- Surrounded by: Beringen, Gächlingen, Hemmental, Löhningen, Neunkirch, Schleitheim
- Website: www.siblingen.ch

Siblingen is a municipality in the canton of Schaffhausen in Switzerland.

== Geography ==
Aerial view from 300 m by Walter Mittelholzer (1923)

Siblingen has an area, as of 2006, of 9.3 km^{2} (3.6 sq mi). Of this area, 44.6% is used for agricultural purposes, while 48.7% is forested. Of the rest of the land, 6.3% is settled (buildings or roads) and the remainder (0.4%) is non-productive (rivers or lakes).

== Coat of arms ==
The blazon of the municipal coat of arms is Gules a Pine Tree Vert trunked and eradicated proper.

== Demographics ==
Siblingen has a population (as of 2008) of 743, of which 9.8% are foreign nationals. Of the foreign population, (as of 2008), 52.9% are from Germany, 8.6% are from Italy, and 38.6% are from another country. Over the last 10 years the population has decreased at a rate of -2.9%. Most of the population (as of 2000) speaks German (97.5%), with Spanish being second most common ( 1.0%) and Portuguese being third ( 0.8%).

The age distribution of the population (as of 2008) is children and teenagers (0–19 years old) make up 18.2% of the population, while adults (20–64 years old) make up 65.4% and seniors (over 64 years old) make up 16.4%.

In the 2007 federal election the most popular party was the SVP which received 42.2% of the vote. The next two most popular parties were the SP (33.9%), and the FDP (23.9%) .

In Siblingen about 80.9% of the population (between age 25-64) have completed either non-mandatory upper secondary education or additional higher education (either university or a Fachhochschule). In Siblingen, as of 2007, 2.01% of the population attend kindergarten or another pre-school, 6.29% attend a Primary School, 2.54% attend a lower level Secondary School, and 3.75% attend a higher level Secondary School.

As of 2000, 13.2% of the population belonged to the Roman Catholic Church and 72.8% belonged to the Swiss Reformed Church.

The historical population is given in the following table:

year	population
1990	743
2000	718

== Economy ==
Siblingen has an unemployment rate, as of 2007, of 1.02%. As of 2005, there were 61 people employed in the primary economic sector and about 25 businesses involved in this sector. 37 people are employed in the secondary sector and there are 12 businesses in this sector. 62 people are employed in the tertiary sector, with 23 businesses in this sector.

As of 2008 the mid year average unemployment rate was 1.2%. There were 31 non-agrarian businesses in the municipality and 47.1% of the (non-agrarian) population was involved in the secondary sector of the economy while 52.9% were involved in the third. At the same time, 70.2% of the working population was employed full-time, and 29.8% was employed part-time. There were 104 residents of the municipality who were employed in some capacity, of which females made up 34.6% of the workforce. As of 2000 there were 109 residents who worked in the municipality, while 248 residents worked outside Siblingen and 38 people commuted into the municipality for work.

As of 2008, there are 2 restaurants, and 1 hotel with 15 beds. The hospitality industry in Siblingen employs 8 people.

== Heritage sites of national significance ==
The early-La Tène culture era graveyard at Auf dem Stein is listed as a Swiss heritage site of national significance.
