= Neuhausen Badischer Bahnhof =

German-owned railway station in Switzerland

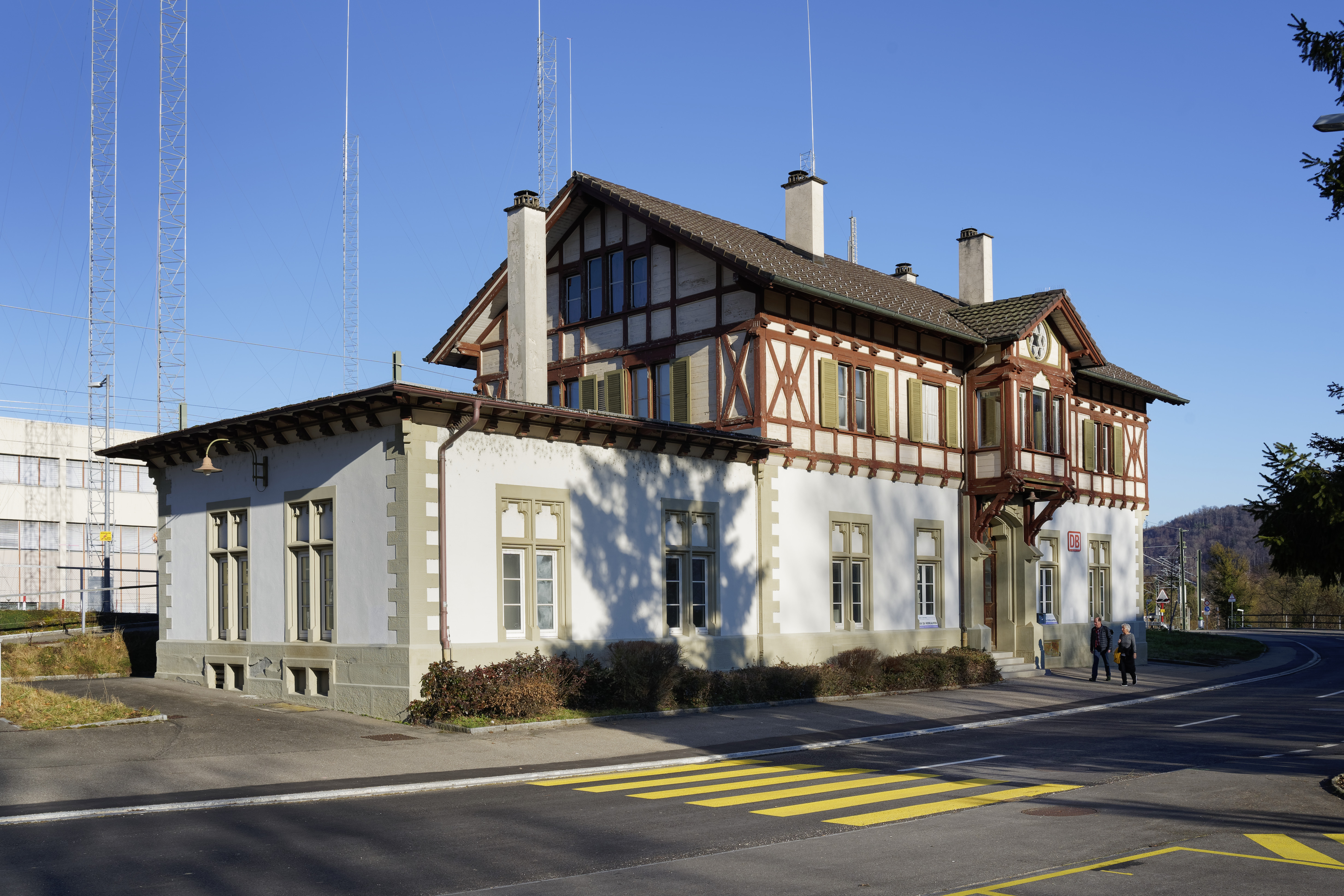
- The disused station building in 2020

General information
- Location: Badische Bahnhofstrasse; Neuhausen am Rheinfall, Schaffhausen; Switzerland
- Coordinates: 47°40′58″N 8°36′42″E
- Elevation: 440 m (1,440 ft)
- Owner: Bundeseisenbahnvermögen (since 1994); Grand Duchy of Baden State Railway (1863-1920), Deutsche Reichsbahn (1920-1949), Deutsche Bundesbahn (1949-1993)
- Lines: High Rhine Railway (KBS 730)
- Distance: 361.1 km (224.4 mi) from Mannheim Hauptbahnhof
- Platforms: 2 side platforms
- Tracks: 2
- Train operators: SBB GmbH
- Connections: Verkehrsbetriebe Schaffhausen (VBSH)
- Bus: Neuhausen, Kreuzstrasse: 1 7 21; Neuhausen, Neue Welt: 1

Other information
- Fare zone: 810 (Tarifverbund Ostwind)

History
- Opened: 1863

Services
Preceding station	Schaffhausen S-Bahn	Following station
Beringerfeld towards Erzingen (Baden)	S64	Schaffhausen Terminus
Location
- Location within Switzerland Location within Canton of Schaffhausen

Neuhausen Badischer Bahnhof (sometimes abbreviated as Neuhausen Bad Bf) is one of three railway stations in the municipality of Neuhausen am Rheinfall (the others being Neuhausen and Neuhausen Rheinfall).

== Location ==
Despite it being situated in Switzerland, the station is located on the High Rhine Railway of the German Deutsche Bahn (DB) that crosses the Swiss-German border several times on its route between Basel and Singen. The station is operated by the DB.

The Badischer Bahnhof is one of three stations in Neuhausen, the other two being Neuhausen Rheinfall and Neuhausen. Neuhausen Rheinfall station lies about 500 metres (1,600 ft) to the south-east, whilst Neuhausen station is 1 kilometre (0.62 mi) to the east.

== Services ==
=== Train ===
As of the December 2023 timetable change, the following services stop at Neuhausen Badischer Bahnhof:

- Schaffhausen S-Bahn S64: half-hourly service between Erzingen (Baden) and Schaffhausen.
- At peak times on working days there are additional quarterly-hour services running between Beringen Badischer Bahnhof and Schaffhausen, calling at Beringerfeld and Neuhausen Badischer Bahnhof.

=== Bus ===
There is no direct bus connection at the station. The nearest bus stops are Neuhausen, Neue Welt (250 metres (820 ft) away), served by municipal bus line 1, and Neuhausen Kreuzstrasse (260 metres (850 ft) away), served by municipal bus lines 1 and 7, and regional bus line 21.
