= Beringen Badischer Bahnhof =

German owned railway station in Switzerland

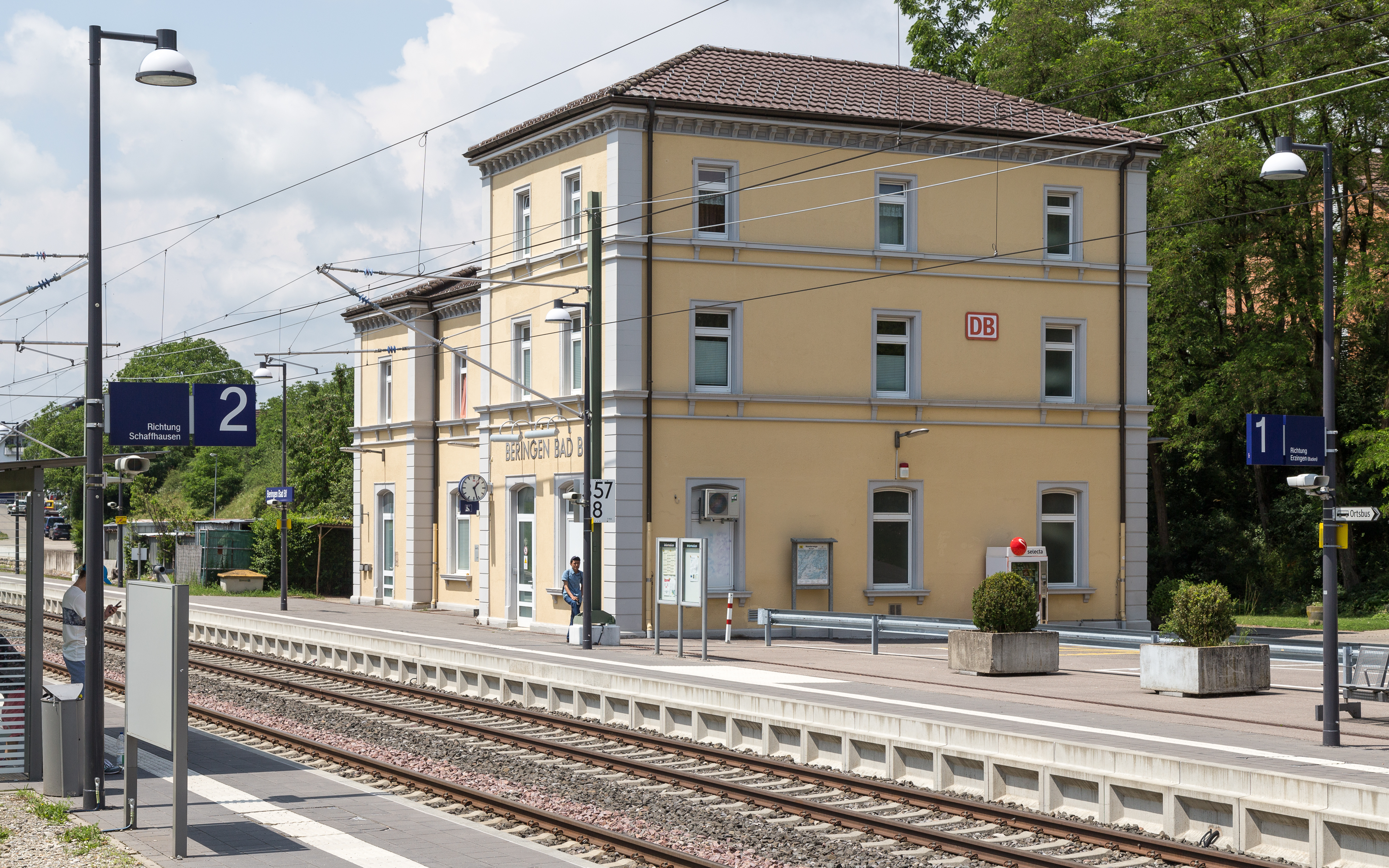
- The station in 2018

General information
- Location: Beringen, Schaffhausen; Switzerland
- Coordinates: 47°41′42″N 8°34′28″E
- Elevation: 441 m (1,447 ft)
- Owner: Bundeseisenbahnvermögen (since 1994); Grand Duchy of Baden State Railway (until 1920), Deutsche Reichsbahn (1920-1949), Deutsche Bundesbahn (1949-1993)
- Lines: High Rhine Railway (KBS 730)
- Distance: 357.8 km (222.3 mi) from Mannheim Hauptbahnhof
- Platforms: 2 side platforms
- Tracks: 2
- Train operators: SBB GmbH
- Connections: vbsh 28

Other information
- Fare zone: 820 (Tarifverbund Ostwind)

History
- Opened: 1862/1863

Services
Preceding station	Schaffhausen S-Bahn	Following station
Neunkirch towards Erzingen (Baden)	S64	Beringerfeld towards Schaffhausen
Location
- Location within Switzerland Location within Canton of Schaffhausen

Beringen Badischer Bahnhof is a railway station in the municipality of Beringen, in the Swiss canton of Schaffhausen. It is located on the standard gauge High Rhine Railway of Deutsche Bahn.

== Services ==
As of the December 2023 timetable change, the following services stop at Beringen Badischer Bahnhof:

- Schaffhausen S-Bahn S64: half-hourly service between Erzingen (Baden) and Schaffhausen.
- At peak times on work days there are additional quarterly-hour services running between Beringen and Schaffhausen, calling at Beringerfeld and Neuhausen Badischer Bahnhof.
