= Lauchringen West station =

Railway station in Lauchringen, Germany

Lauchringen West
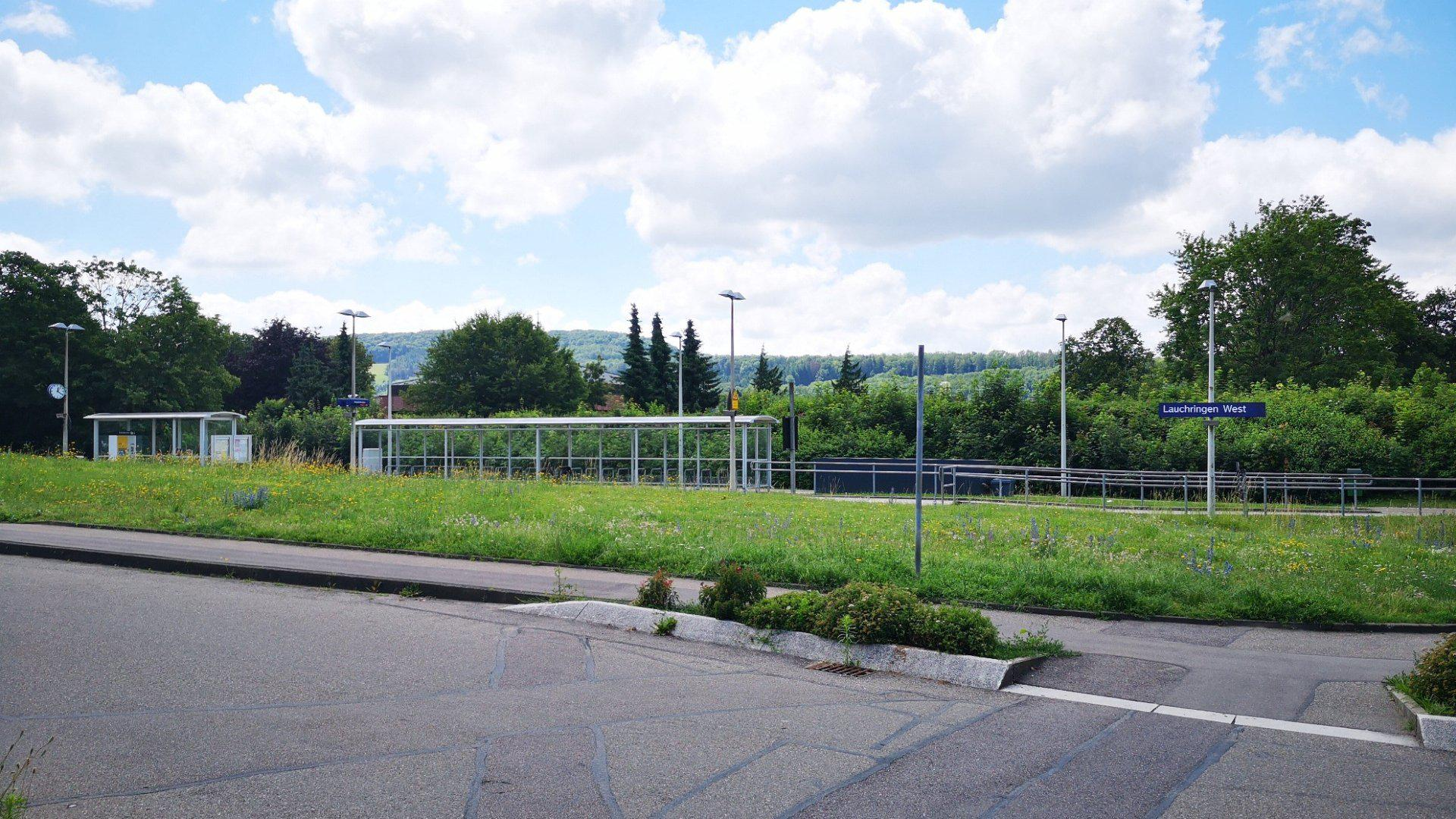
- The station in 2019

General information
- Location: Lauchringen, Baden-Württemberg; Germany
- Coordinates: 47°37′58″N 8°18′29″E
- Owner: DB Netz
- Operator: DB Station&Service
- Lines: High Rhine Railway (KBS 730)
- Distance: 334.0 km (207.5 mi) from Mannheim Hauptbahnhof
- Platforms: 1 side platform
- Tracks: 1
- Train operators: DB Regio Baden-Württemberg

Other information
- Fare zone: 3 (WTV)

Services
Preceding station	Basel S-Bahn	Following station
Tiengen (Hochrhein) One-way operation	RB30	Lauchringen Terminus
Preceding station	DB Regio Baden-Württemberg	Following station
Tiengen (Hochrhein) towards Basel Bad Bf	RE 3	Lauchringen towards Friedrichshafen Hafen
Tiengen (Hochrhein) towards Waldshut	RB 37	Wutöschingen towards Stühlingen or Weizen
Location

Lauchringen West station (German: Bahnhof Lauchringen West) is a railway station in the town of Lauchringen, Baden-Württemberg, Germany. The station lies on the High Rhine Railway. The train services are operated by Deutsche Bahn. Because of the track layout at neighboring Lauchringen, this is the final stop on the High Rhine Railway for trains heading up the Wutach Valley Railway.

== Services ==
As of the December 2023 timetable change, the following services stop at Lauchringen West:

- IRE:
  - RE 3 two trains towards Singen (Hohentwiel)
- RB:
  - RB30 hourly service between Basel Bad Bf and Lauchringen.
  - RB 37 infrequent weekday service between Waldshut and Weizen.
