= Beringerfeld railway station =

German owned railway station in Switzerland

Beringerfeld
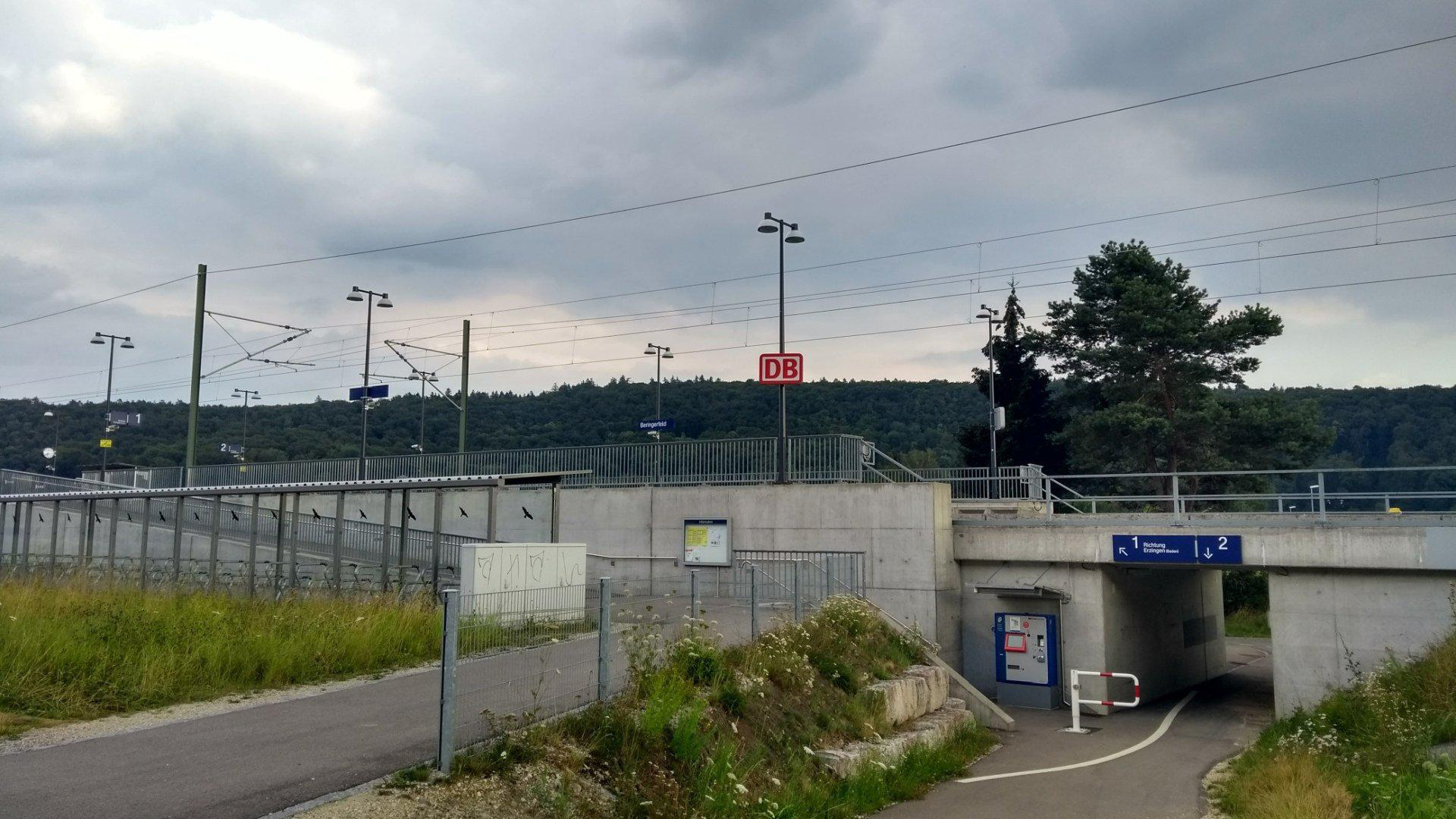
- The station in 2018

General information
- Location: Beringen, Schaffhausen; Switzerland
- Coordinates: 47°41′43″N 8°35′32″E
- Elevation: 440 m (1,440 ft)
- Owner: Bundeseisenbahnvermögen (since 1994)
- Lines: High Rhine Railway (KBS 730)
- Distance: 359.2 km (223.2 mi) from Mannheim Hauptbahnhof
- Platforms: 2 side platforms
- Tracks: 2
- Train operators: SBB GmbH
- Connections: vbsh 21

Other information
- Fare zone: 820 (Tarifverbund Ostwind)

Services
Preceding station	Schaffhausen S-Bahn	Following station
Beringen Bad Bf towards Erzingen (Baden)	S64	Neuhausen Bad Bf towards Schaffhausen
Location
- Location within Switzerland Location within Canton of Schaffhausen

Beringerfeld railway station (German: Bahnhof Beringerfeld) is a railway station in the municipality of Beringen, in the Swiss canton of Schaffhausen. It is located on the standard gauge High Rhine Railway of Deutsche Bahn.

== Services ==
As of the December 2023 timetable change, the following services stop at Beringerfeld:

- Schaffhausen S-Bahn S64: half-hourly service between Erzingen (Baden) and Schaffhausen.
- At peak times on work days there are additional quarterly-hour services running between Beringen Badischer Bahnhof and Schaffhausen, calling at Beringerfeld and Neuhausen Badischer Bahnhof.
