= Trasadingen =

- Municipality
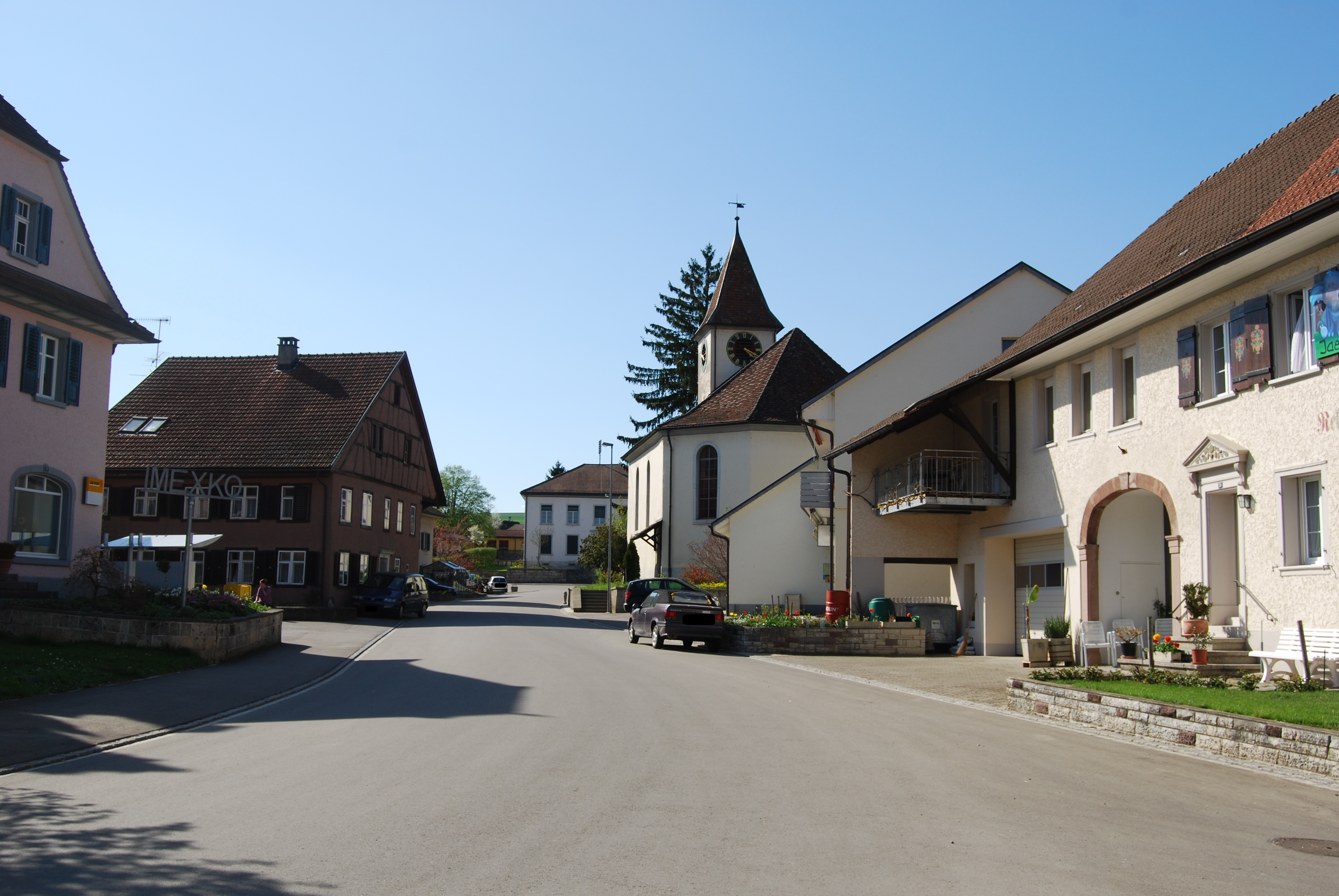

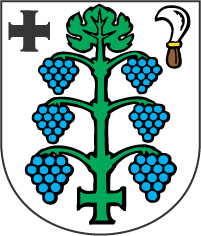
- Coat of arms
- Location of Trasadingen
- Location within Switzerland Location within Canton of Schaffhausen
- Coordinates: 47°40′N 8°25′E
- Country: Switzerland
- Canton: Schaffhausen
- District: n.a.

Area
  - Total: 4.14 km^{2} (1.60 sq mi)
- Elevation: 403 m (1,322 ft)

Population (December 2008)
  - Total: 585
  - Density: 141/km^{2} (366/sq mi)
- Time zone: UTC+01:00 (CET)
  - Summer (DST): UTC+02:00 (CEST)
- Postal code: 8219
- SFOS number: 2973
- ISO 3166 code: CH-SH
- Surrounded by: Eggingen (DE-BW), Hallau, Klettgau (DE-BW), Wilchingen
- Website: www.trasadingen.ch

Trasadingen is a municipality in the canton of Schaffhausen in Switzerland.

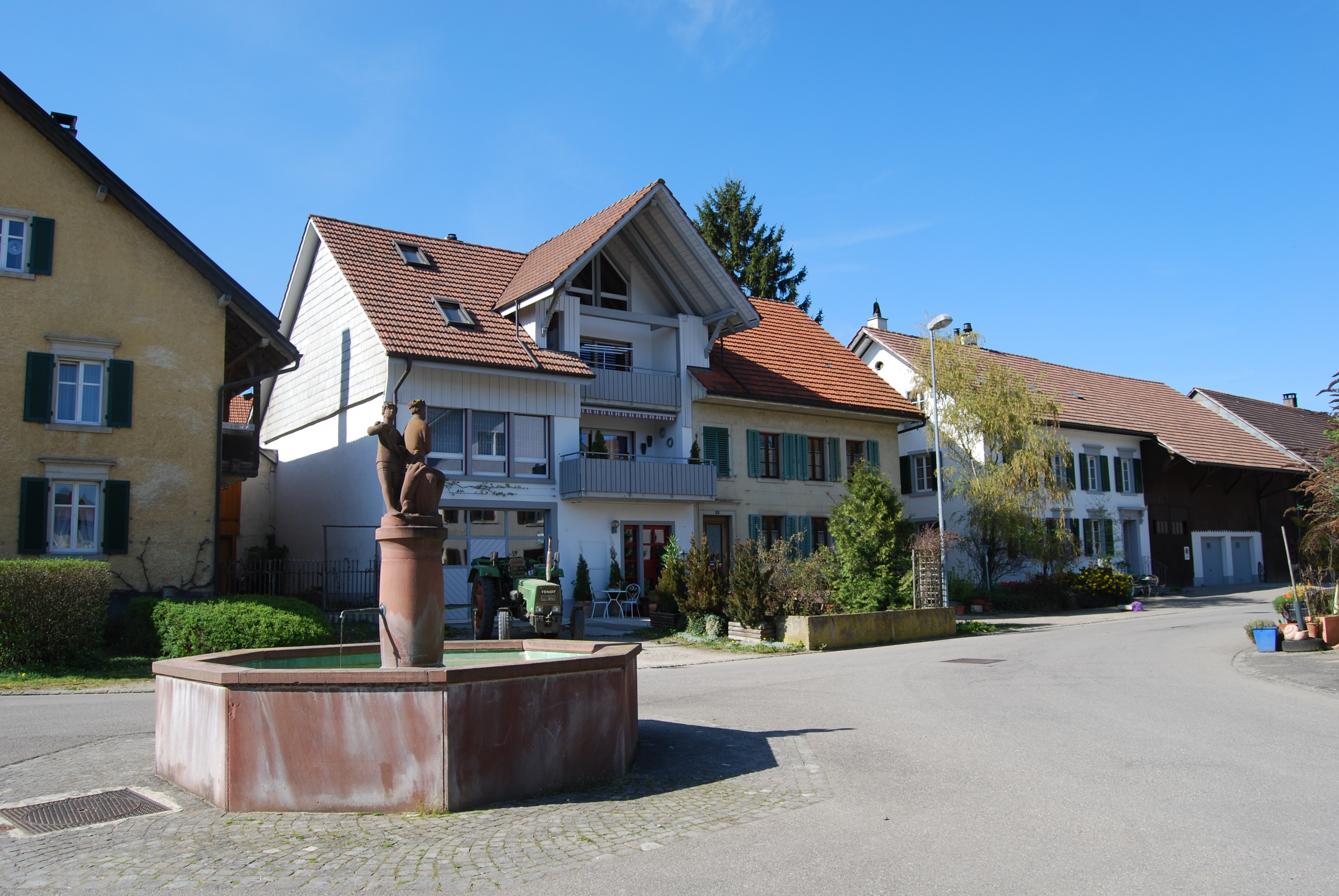
Trasadingen

== Geography ==
Aerial view from 400 m by Walter Mittelholzer (1919)

Trasadingen has an area, as of 2006, of 4.1 km^{2} (1.6 sq mi). Of this area, 76.3% is used for agricultural purposes, while 12.2% is forested. Of the rest of the land, 11% is settled (buildings or roads) and the remainder (0.5%) is non-productive (rivers or lakes).

== Coat of arms ==
The blazon of the municipal coat of arms is Argent, a Vine Vert fructed Azure issuant from a Cross pattee of the second and in chief dexter a Cross pattee Sable and sinister a Sickle proper.

== Demographics ==
Trasadingen has a population (as of 2008) of 585, of which 13.7% are foreign nationals. Of the foreign population, (as of 2008), 61.7% are from Germany, 23.5% are from Italy, 1.2% are from Turkey, and 13.6% are from another country. Over the last 10 years the population has grown at a rate of 2.6%. Most of the population (as of 2000) speaks German (96.8%), with Italian being second most common ( 0.8%) and English being third ( 0.4%).

The age distribution of the population (as of 2008) is children and teenagers (0–19 years old) make up 23.8% of the population, while adults (20–64 years old) make up 59.1% and seniors (over 64 years old) make up 17.1%.

In the 2007 federal election the most popular party was the SVP which received 46.6% of the vote. The next two most popular parties were the SP (28.4%), and the FDP (25%) .

In Trasadingen about 83.5% of the population (between age 25–64) have completed either non-mandatory upper secondary education or additional higher education (either university or a Fachhochschule). In Trasadingen, as of 2007, 1.72% of the population attend kindergarten or another pre-school, 5.66% attend a Primary School, 3.95% attend a lower level Secondary School, and 2.23% attend a higher level Secondary School.

As of 2000, 21.7% of the population belonged to the Roman Catholic Church and 61.7% belonged to the Swiss Reformed Church.

The historical population is given in the following table:

year	population
1990	560
2000	562

== Transportation ==
There is a border crossing into Germany at Trasadingen town with Erzingen in Klettgau municipality, Baden-Württemberg state. Both have railway stations on the High Rhine Railway: Trasadingen and Erzingen (Baden), respectively.

== Economy ==
Trasadingen has an unemployment rate of 1.82%. As of 2005, there were 61 people employed in the primary economic sector and about 23 businesses involved in this sector. 93 people are employed in the secondary sector and there are 6 businesses in this sector. 74 people are employed in the tertiary sector, with 22 businesses in this sector.

As of 2008 the mid year average unemployment rate was 1%. There were 29 non-agrarian businesses in the municipality and 57% of the (non-agrarian) population was involved in the secondary sector of the economy while 43% were involved in the third. At the same time, 67.1% of the working population was employed full-time, and 32.9% was employed part-time. There were 158 residents of the municipality who were employed in some capacity, of which females made up 45.6% of the workforce. As of 2000 there were 82 residents who worked in the municipality, while 162 residents worked outside Trasadingen and 75 people commuted into the municipality for work.

As of 2008, there are 2 restaurants and the hospitality industry in Trasadingen employs 8 people.
