= Trasadingen railway station =

German owned railway station in Switzerland

Trasadingen
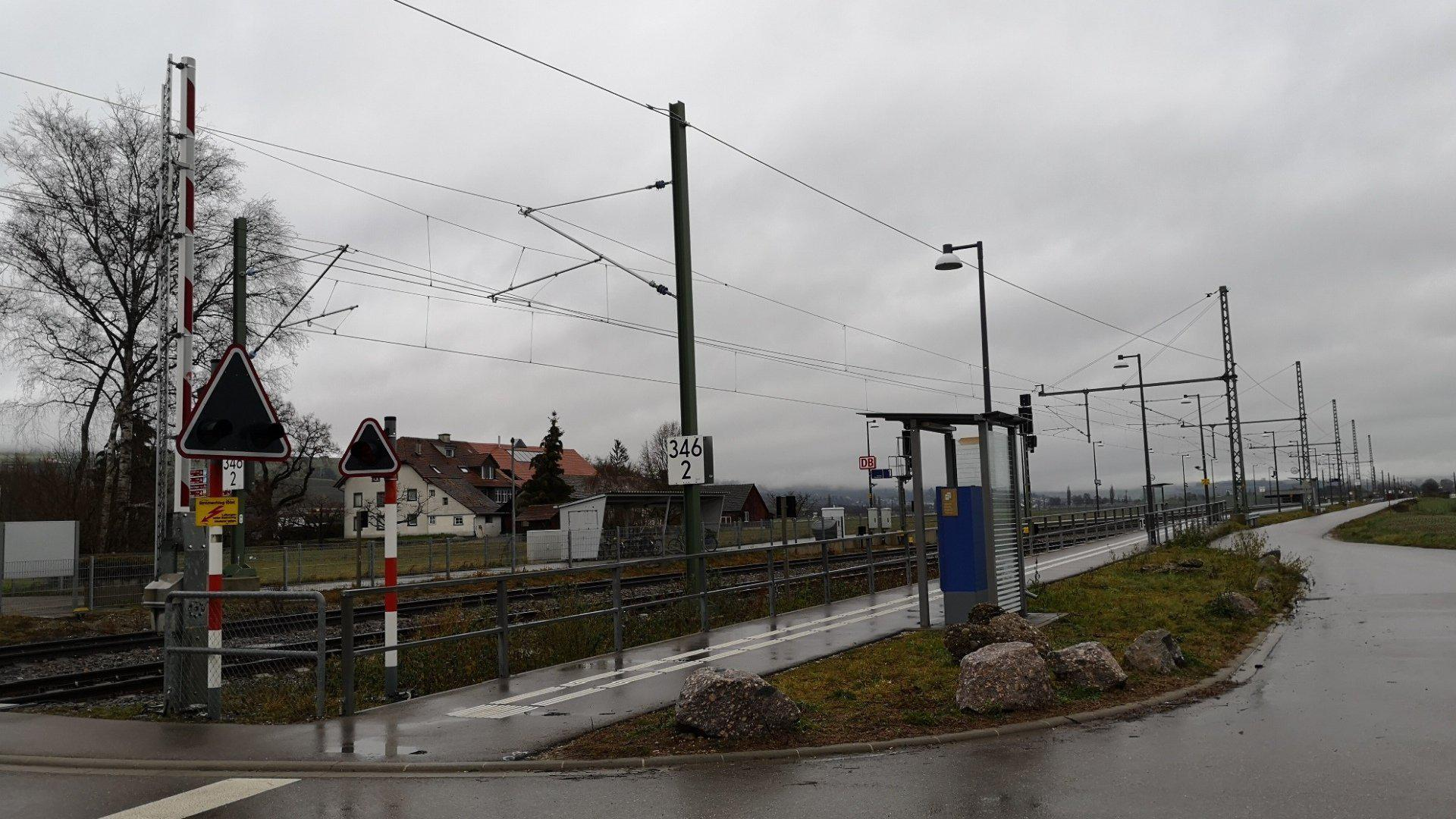
- The station in 2019

General information
- Location: Trasadingen, Schaffhausen; Switzerland
- Coordinates: 47°39′56″N 8°26′15″E
- Elevation: 404 m (1,325 ft)
- Owner: Bundeseisenbahnvermögen (since 1994)
- Lines: High Rhine Railway (KBS 730)
- Distance: 346.2 km (215.1 mi) from Mannheim Hauptbahnhof
- Platforms: 2 side platforms
- Tracks: 2
- Train operators: SBB GmbH

Other information
- Fare zone: 840 (Tarifverbund Ostwind)

Services
Preceding station	Schaffhausen S-Bahn	Following station
Erzingen (Baden) Terminus	S64	Wilchingen-Hallau towards Schaffhausen
Location
- Location within Switzerland Location within Canton of Schaffhausen

Trasadingen railway station (German: Bahnhof Trasadingen) is a railway station in the municipality of Trasadingen, in the Swiss canton of Schaffhausen. It is located on the standard gauge High Rhine Railway of Deutsche Bahn.

== Services ==
As of the December 2023 timetable change, the following services stop at Trasadingen:

- Schaffhausen S-Bahn S64: half-hourly service between Erzingen (Baden) and Schaffhausen.

== Customs ==
Trasadingen is, for customs purposes, a border station for passengers arriving from Germany. Customs checks may be performed in Trasadingen station or on board trains by Swiss officials. Systematic passport controls were abolished when Switzerland joined the Schengen Area in 2008.

== See also ==
- Rail transport in Switzerland
