= Tiengen (Hochrhein) station =

Railway station in Waldshut-Tiengen, Germany

Tiengen (Hochrhein)
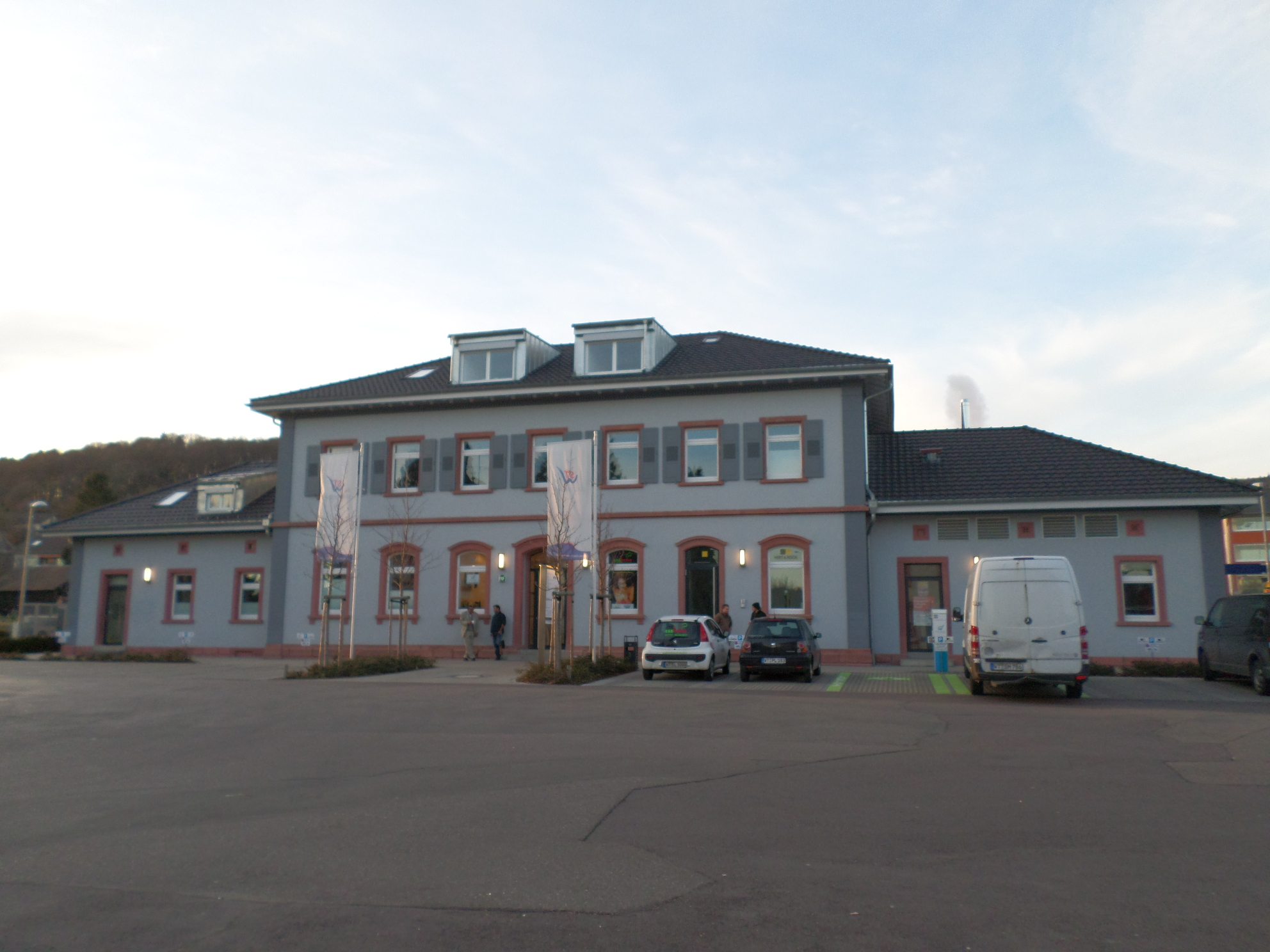
- The station in 2015

General information
- Location: Bahnhofstraße 2 Waldshut-Tiengen, Baden-Württemberg; Germany
- Coordinates: 47°38′08″N 8°16′19″E
- Elevation: 348 m (1,142 ft)
- Owner: DB Netz
- Operator: DB Station&Service
- Lines: High Rhine Railway (KBS 730)
- Distance: 331.1 km (205.7 mi) from Mannheim Hauptbahnhof
- Platforms: 1 side platform
- Tracks: 1
- Train operators: DB Regio Baden-Württemberg
- Connections: Südbadenbus bus lines

Other information
- Station code: 6216
- DS100 code: RTI
- IBNR: 8005871
- Category: 5
- Fare zone: 3 (WTV)

History
- Opened: 15 June 1863

Services
Preceding station	DB Regio Baden-Württemberg	Following station
Waldshut towards Basel Bad Bf	RE 3	Erzingen (Baden) towards Friedrichshafen Hafen
Waldshut Terminus	RB 37	Lauchringen West towards Stühlingen or Weizen
Preceding station	Basel S-Bahn	Following station
Waldshut towards Basel Bad Bf	RB30	Lauchringen West towards Lauchringen
Location

Tiengen (Hochrhein) station (German: Bahnhof Tiengen (Hochrhein)) is a railway station in the town of Tiengen, Baden-Württemberg, Germany. The station lies on the High Rhine Railway and was opened on 15 June 1863. The train services are operated by Deutsche Bahn.

== Services ==
As of the December 2023 timetable change, the following services stop at Tiengen (Hochrhein):

- RE 3: hourly service between Basel Bad Bf and Singen (Hohentwiel); every other train continues from Singen to Ulm Hauptbahnhof.
- RB:
  - Basel S-Bahn RB30 hourly service between Basel Bad Bf and Lauchringen.
  - DB Regio Baden-Württemberg RB 37 infrequent weekday service between Waldshut and Weizen.
