= Friedrichshafen Stadt–Friedrichshafen Hafen railway =

Railway line in Germany

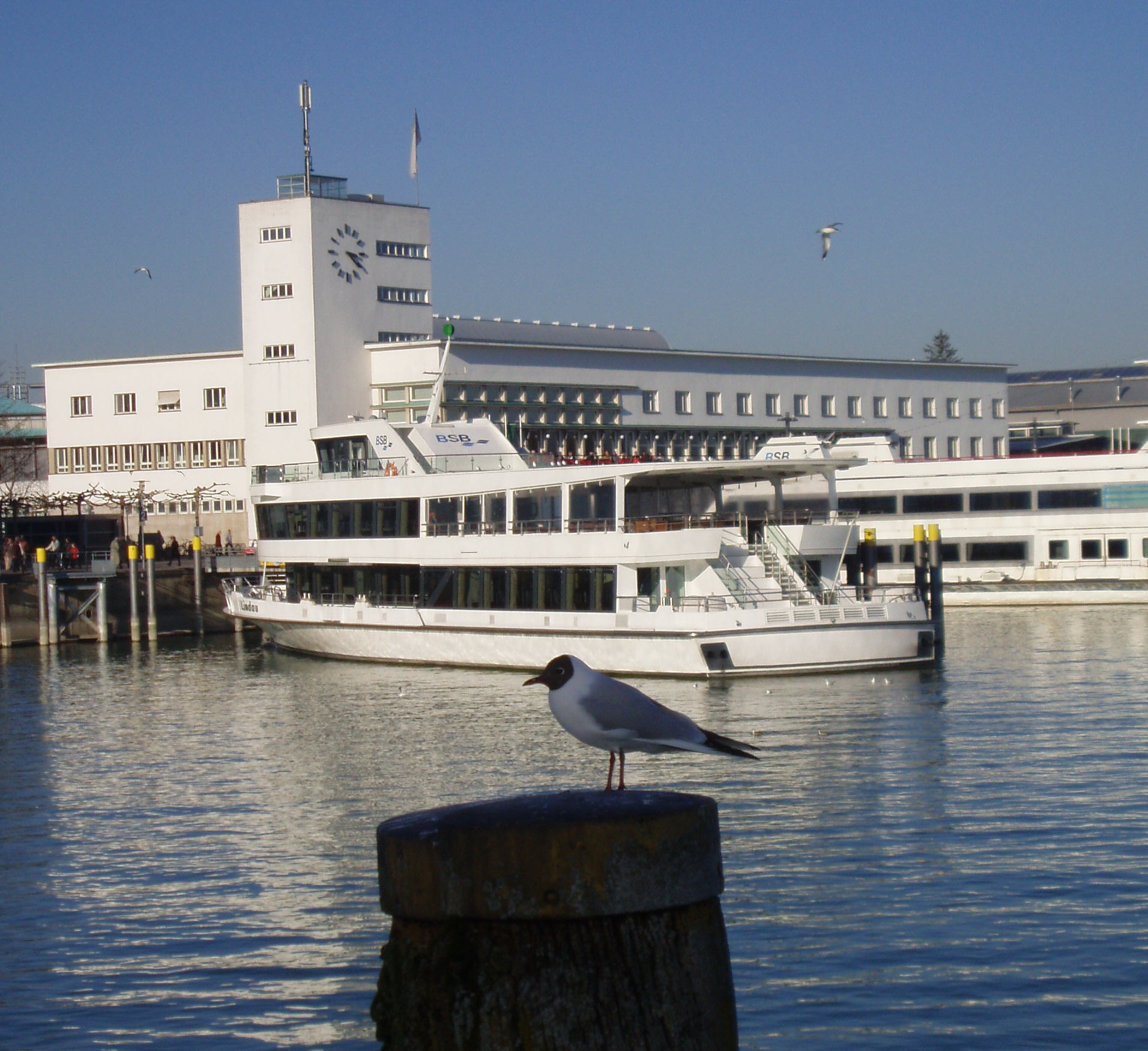
- Friedrichshafen Hafen terminus

Overview
- Line number: 751
- Locale: Baden-Württemberg, Germany

Service
- Route number: 4531

Technical
- Line length: 0.816 km (0.507 mi)
- Number of tracks: 2
- Track gauge: 1,435 mm (4 ft 8 1/2 in) standard gauge
- Electrification: 15 kV/16.7 Hz AC overhead catenary

The Friedrichshafen Stadt–Friedrichshafen Hafen railway (or Friedrichshafen City–Friedrichshafen Port railway; German: Bahnstrecke Friedrichshafen Stadt–Friedrichshafen Hafen) is a standard gauge and electrified railway line in the city of Friedrichshafen in the German state of Baden-Württemberg. It connects the town station with the port station. The 816 metre-long branch line has its own VzG route number, 4531, although operationally it is a connection between two parts of the same station.

== History ==
After Friedrichshafen had been connected to the first section of the Ulm–Friedrichshafen railway in 1847, the Royal Württemberg State Railways (Königlich Württembergische Staats-Eisenbahnen) began on the construction of the extension towards the port in 1849. The new line to the shore of Lake Constance finally opened on 1 June 1850. Its maximum gradient is 1:45 and its minimum curve radius is 150 metres. Its main purpose continues to be to link the German railway network and the international Friedrichshafen–Romanshorn ferry line. Until 1974 there was a train ferry to Switzerland. The line has been electrified since December 2021.

== Operations ==
The line belongs to Deutsche Bahn. In addition to carrying DB regional trains, it has been used since 1 June 1997 by the railcars of the private Bodensee-Oberschwaben-Bahn (BOB) between city and port stations, which have to reverse in the city station. In terms of fares, the connection – like all lines in the region – has been integrated into the Bodensee-Oberschwaben Verkehrsverbund (Bodensee-Oberschwaben transport association, bodo), which was founded on 1 January 2004, from the start.
