= Lake Constance train ferries =

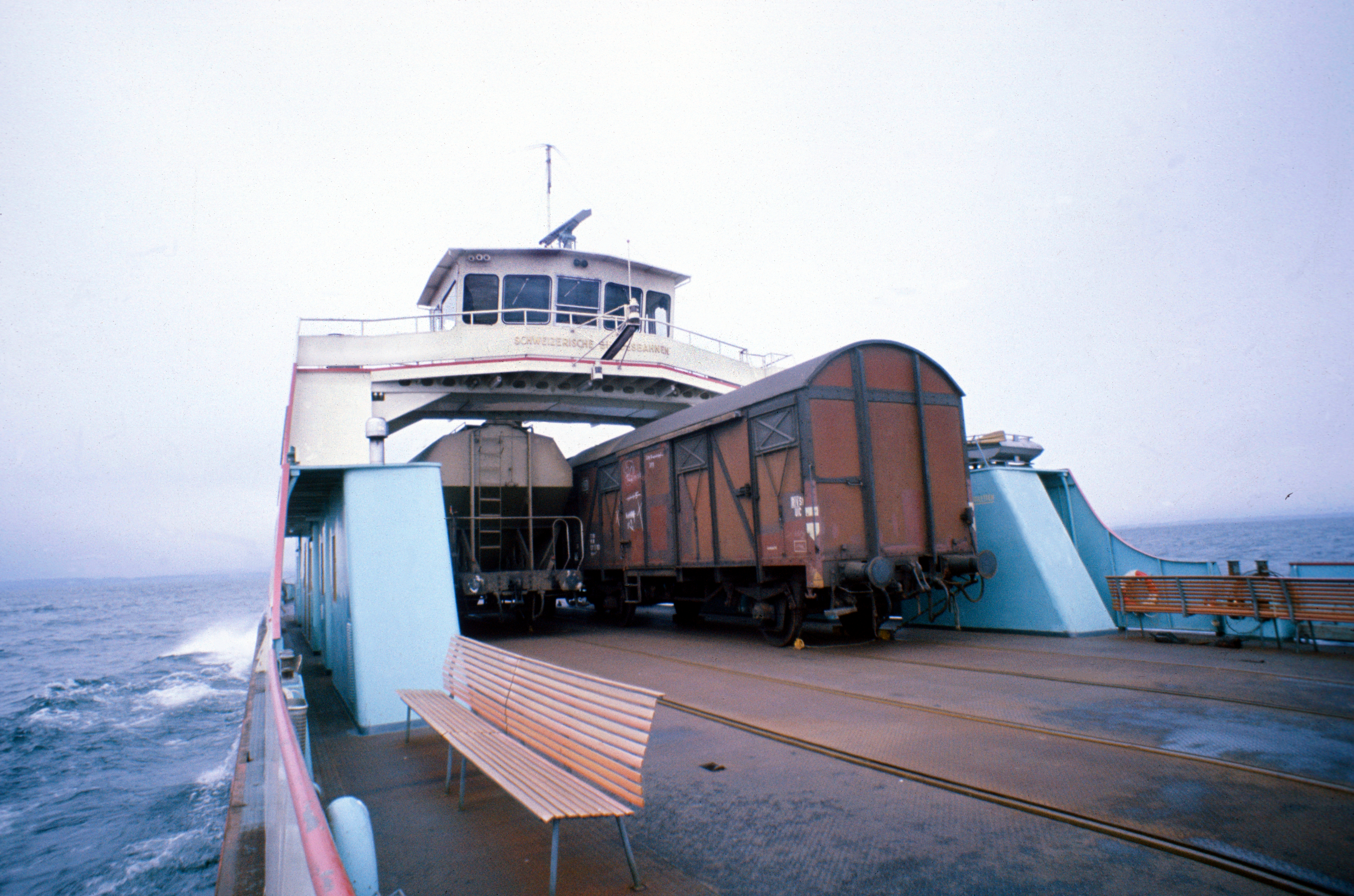
The Rorschach train ferry of the Swiss Federal Railways in 1976, the last year of the Lake Constance train ferries

The Lake Constance train ferries (Bodensee-Trajekte) were train ferries that were set up in the 19th century by railway companies to transport rail freight wagons across Lake Constance (Bodensee) between the five states located around the lake at the time. In the heyday of the railways, they were of great importance, especially for freight traffic.

== Early history ==
Traffic parallel to the shore initially dominated shipping on Lake Constance. It was not until railways reached some port cities that the importance of the connections across Lake Constance increased, especially for grain traffic. Starting from 1824, steamboats were operated by different companies, rising to 2,874 in 1874.

- The first German railway company to reach Lake Constance was the Royal Württemberg State Railways (Königlich Württembergische Staats-Eisenbahnen) with its Southern Railway (Südbahn) in Friedrichshafen. The railway line from Friedrichshafen to Ravensburg was opened on 8 November 1847. However, a connection with the Württemberg Central Railway in the Stuttgart area only emerged after the opening of the entire Southern Railway to Ulm on 1 June and the Central Railway on 29 June 1850. A royal decree ordered a separate port station on the lake, so the state railway built the Friedrichshafen Stadt–Friedrichshafen Hafen railway between the two stations, which also went into operation on 1 June 1850. In order to improve the organisation of shipping, the Friedrichshafen-Lake Constance Steamboat Company (Württembergische Bodensee-Dampfschiffgesellschaft), which had been founded 30 years earlier, was nationalised in 1854 and subordinated to the state railways.
- In Bavaria, the Ludwig South-North Railway (Ludwigs-Süd-Nord-Bahn) reached Augsburg via Kempten on 12 October 1853 and was connected to Lindau on Lake Constance on 1 March 1854. The southern part of this line now forms part of the Buchloe–Lindau railway. After the nationalisation of the private Bavarian Maritime Company (Bayerischen Schiffahrts-Gesellschaft), it became part of the Royal Bavarian State Railways (Königlich Bayerische Staats-Eisenbahnen) in 1863.
- Baden as the builder of the third German line to the lake, built its main line along the Upper Rhine and the High Rhine via Singen and reached Konstanz on 15 June 1863. However, the Grand Duchy of Baden State Railways (Großherzoglich Badische Staatseisenbahnen) had direct connections with Basel, Waldshut, Schaffhausen and Konstanz and therefore did not need a rail ferry to Switzerland.
- The Swiss Northeastern Railway (Schweizerische Nordostbahn, NOB) opened its line from Winterthur to Romanshorn on 16 May 1855 and extended it to Rorschach (Lake Line) on 15 October 1869. The St. Gallisch-Appenzellische Eisenbahn (SGAE), a predecessor of the United Swiss Railways (Vereinigte Schweizerbahnen, VSB), had previously opened the Rorschach–St. Gallen railway line with an extension to the port station Rorschach Hafen on 25 December 1856.

The railway companies could initially only be connected with each other over the lake, since the Lake Constance Belt Railway (Bodenseegürtelbahn) on the German side was only built between 1867 and 1901 (in several stages). A line to Bregenz in Austria and continuing to Switzerland was only completed with the opening of the line to Bregenz on 24 October 1872. Until then passengers travelling to Switzerland had to continue over Lake Constance on a ship. The goods arriving by train were loaded at the final stations onto steamers (at that time combined cargo and passenger ships) or towed barges and at the destination they were reloaded onto the freight wagons of another railway company. The use of train ferries could reduce these transshipment processes. With the opening of the Swiss Gotthard Tunnel, the rail route over Lake Constance came to have great importance for all the railway companies.

== Train ferry traffic ==
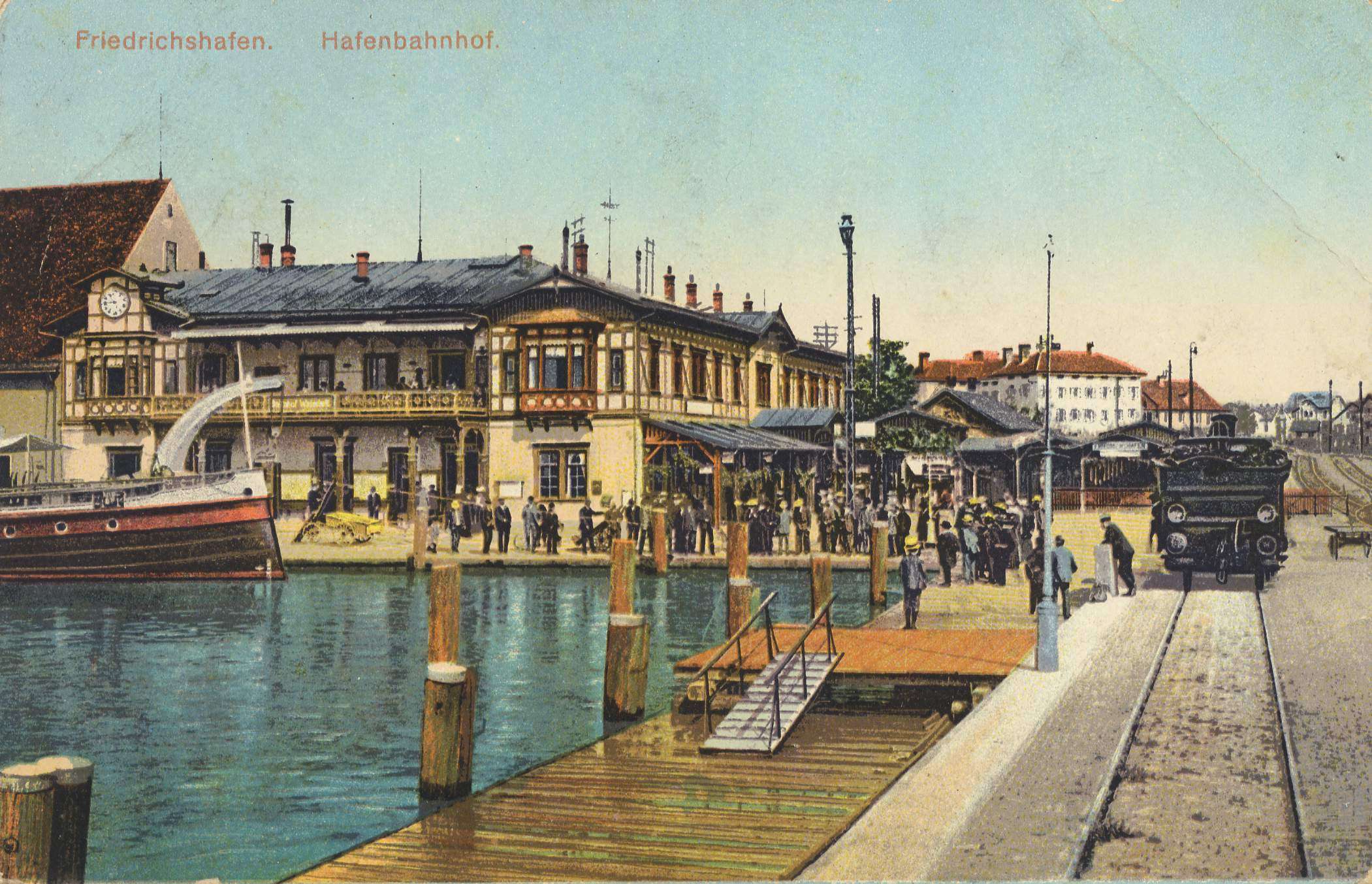
The port station in Friedrichshafen in about 1900

At first, the emerging train ferry traffic used barges that were towed by steamers. Two parallel tracks were laid on the decks of the barges, each of which could accommodate up to eight wagons. Loading and unloading had to proceed in stages, because the complete unloading of only one of the two parallel tracks would have caused the barge to lean so much that the remaining wagons would have fallen into the lake. The barges were towed across the lake either by a passenger steamer or a dedicated tug.

=== Establishment of individual train ferries ===
- The Royal Bavarian State Railways commenced train ferry services in 1869 from Lindau to Romanshorn on the Swiss shore with barges towed by passenger steamers. It put the Trajektschiff II, a paddle steamer, into service in 1874. It had a length of 73 m and a width of 18 m. It was powered by two steam engines, each with about 290 horsepower and it had a tall funnel on each side. Up to 16 freight cars could be accommodated on two parallel tracks on the bow and stern of the ship. In addition, it was able to tow up to two barges. The steamer was decommissioned in 1923 and scrapped in 1928.
- The Württemberg State Railway together with the Swiss Northeast Railway opened a train ferry service between Friedrichshafen and Romanshorn on 22 February 1869. The first train ferry service in Romanshorn, which transported 12,200 freight wagons in the first year of operation, was launched on 20 January 1869. This first steam-powered train ferry, a paddle steamer, was developed by John Scott Russell, a Scottish engineer, but it was soon called a "coal eater", consuming 600 to 720 kilograms of coal per crossing. So it was taken out of service in 1883. The ship had a funnel on each side next to huge paddle wheels. In its middle, it had two tracks for freight wagons, allowing a total of 18 wagons to be carried.
- The train ferry between Lindau and Konstanz was opened in 1873.
- Following the opening of the Arlberg Railway Tunnel in 1884, a train ferry service was operated by the Austrian Lake Constance Shipping Service (Österreichische Bodenseeschifffahrt) from Bregenz to Konstanz, Friedrichshafen and Romanshorn.
- A train ferry service also operated from Ludwigshafen (formerly Sernatingen). The siding and a crane can still be seen at the harbour today.

=== Ferry operations ===
After the completion of the Lake Constance Belt Railway, the costs of the train ferry operations were investigated. This showed that transport by train ferry was twice as expensive as transport around the lake by rail. However, since the single-track Belt Railway could not accommodate the additional traffic and the train ferry was faster (as so much time was lost at the two border clearances on the line via Bregenz to Switzerland), train ferry operations were retained. So work was also carried out between the two world wars on the improvement of the ferry operations. The port facilities were expanded and the train ferry ramp was equipped with electrical controls. Deutsche Reichsbahn, which was responsible for all train ferry traffic on Lake Constance from 1920, commenced operation with the ferry Schussen in 1929. The ship was powered by two diesel engines and could carry ten freight wagons on two parallel tracks across the lake. This ferry could now also carry cars. The new Hafenbahnhof (port station) was opened together with the rebuilt tracks at the port of Friedrichshafen on 7 March 1933. It now houses the Zeppelin Museum.

=== Closure of train ferry operations ===
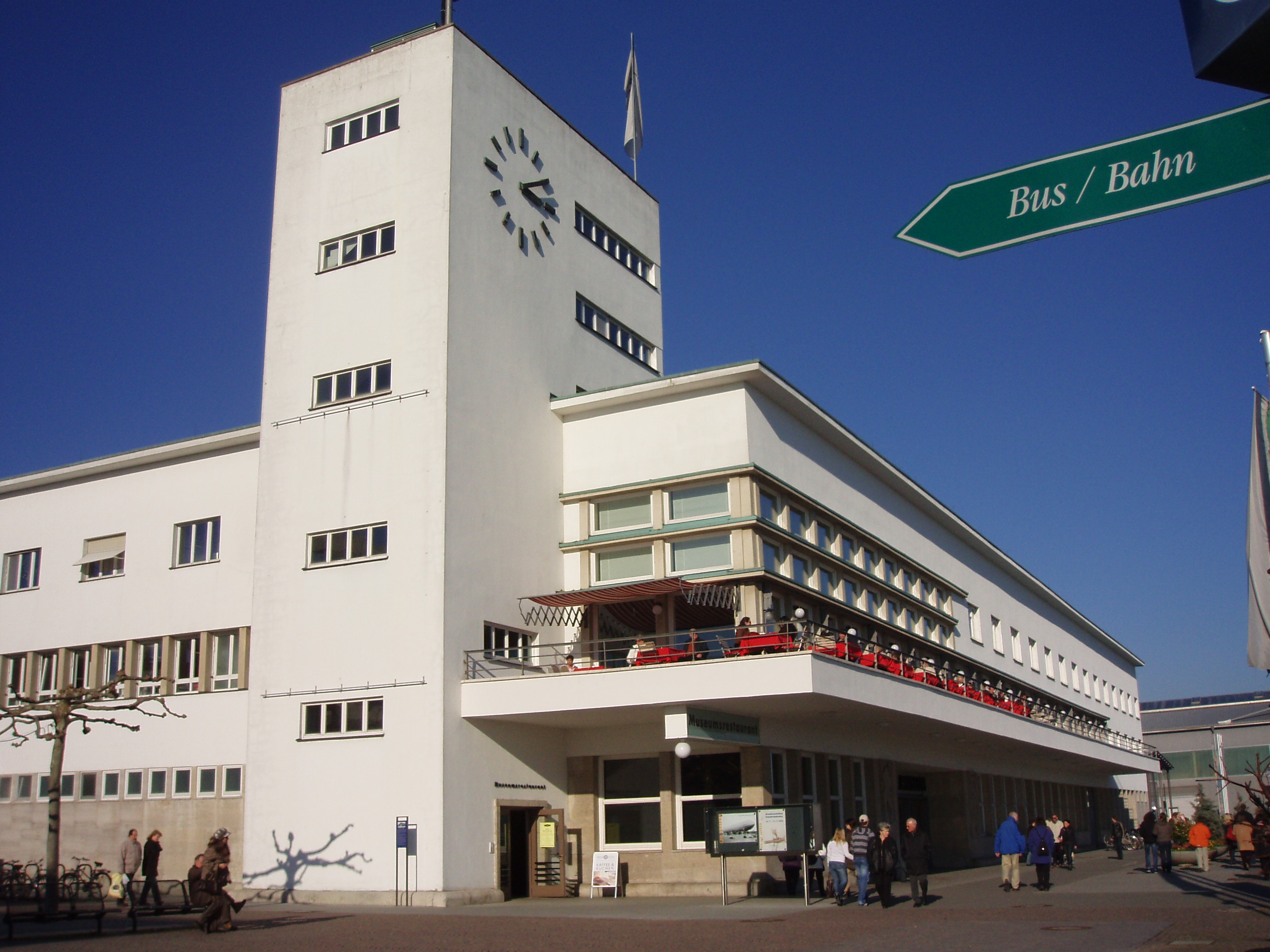
Friedrichshafen Hafen station built in 1933, now housing the Zeppelin Museum

- The first train ferry, the connection between Lindau and Constance, was closed in 1899 and the previously operated traffic was taken over by the Lake Constance Belt Railway.
- 34,000 wagons were still carried on the Lindau–Romanshorn route in 1934. The train ferry traffic, however, was discontinued in 1938 (soon after the Anschluss—the annexation of Austria by Nazi Germany), as one of the two border crossings had been abolished and rail transport to Switzerland was cheaper and now faster.
- Train ferry operations were suspended during the Second World War.
- Train ferry operations were resumed on the Friedrichshafen–Romanshorn route at the urging of Switzerland on 15 May 1949. 663,232 freight cars were transported across Lake Constance until the final closure on 29 May 1976.

== Overview of train ferry links ==
Connections	Opened	Adjusted	Comments
Lindau-Insel–Romanshorn	1869	1939	Interrupted in the First World War
Romanshorn–Friedrichshafen Hafen	1869	1976	Interrupted in the First and Second World War
Bregenz–Konstanz	1884	1917	
Lindau-Insel–Konstanz	1873	1899	
Bregenz–Romanshorn	1884	1915	
Bregenz–Friedrichshafen Hafen	1884	1913	

== Ferries ==
The train ferry traffic over Lake Constance on the Friedrichshafen–Romanshorn route began in 1869 with a steam ferry. In addition, in the same year, unpowered barges were towed by the Bavarian State Railways on the Lindau–Romanshorn route. From 1929 motorised train ferries were used for the carriage of freight wagons or motor vehicles.

=== Unpowered barges ===
In order to increase transport capacity, all national and state railways used non-powered ferry barges. Specifically, in the home port of Lindau there were three train ferry barges (Trajektkähne) I, II and III (1869), in the home port of Konstanz there were three ferry barges, the Ludwigshafen (1872) and Baden (1893), in the home port of Friedrichshafen there were the Tr. I (1877) and Tr. II (1885) and the screw propeller ferry Buchhorn (1891), in the home port of Bregenz there were ferry barges I, II, III, and IV (1885) and the screw propeller ferry Bregenz (1885) and in the home port of Romanshorn there were ferry barges A (1884) and B (1885). One or two barges were hauled across the lake by a passenger ferry or a steamship. Six ferry barges were converted from 1926 into self-propelled boats and motorised. A motor ferry towed a ferry barge carrying 14 wagons.

=== Steam ferries ===
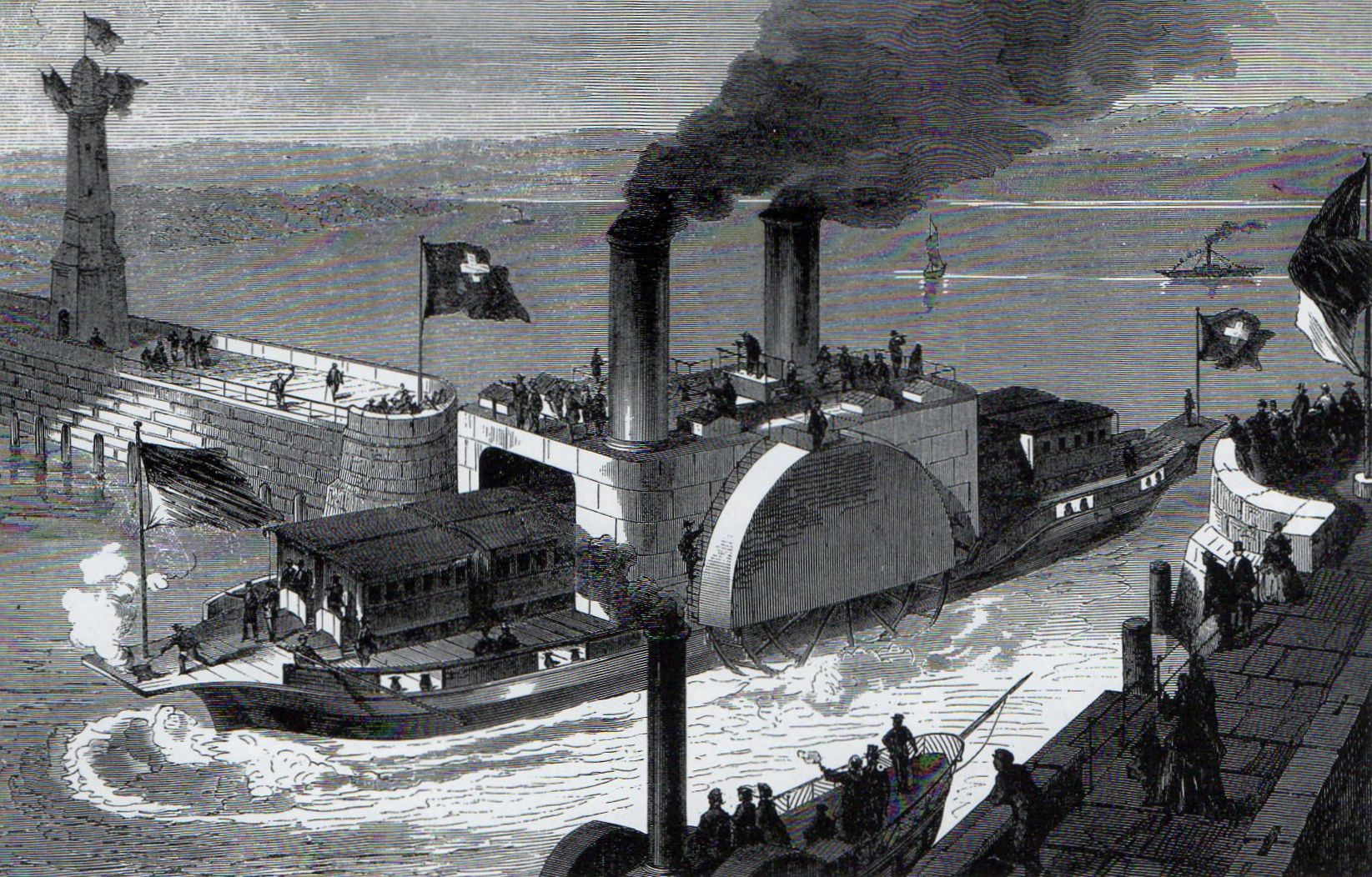
The "coal eater"

The first steam train ferry was put into operation in 1869 in Friedrichshafen jointly by the Royal Württemberg State Railway and the Swiss Northeastern Railway. The engineer was an Englishman, John Scott Russell, who had already built the Stadt Schaffhausen in 1851 for Switzerland and was also involved in the construction of the Great Eastern (which at the time of its launch in 1858 was by far the world's biggest ship). Like many of the working ships built at that time by Escher-Wyss of Zürich in Romanshorn, it had no name. Because of the enormous coal consumption of more than 50 kg of coal per km, it was soon popularly called the Kohlefresser (coal eater). The uneconomic ferry was taken out of service after boiler damage in 1883 and scrapped in 1885.

In 1874, the Royal Bavarian State Railway received another steam train ferry, also built by Escher-Wyss. The ferry was used on the Lindau-Romanshorn route until 1914. At the beginning of the First World War, operations were suspended and were not resumed after the war. After more than twelve years in Lindau harbor, the ship was scrapped in Altenrhein in 1927. The two steam train ferries were the only ships on Lake Constance with two funnels.

=== Motor train ferries ===
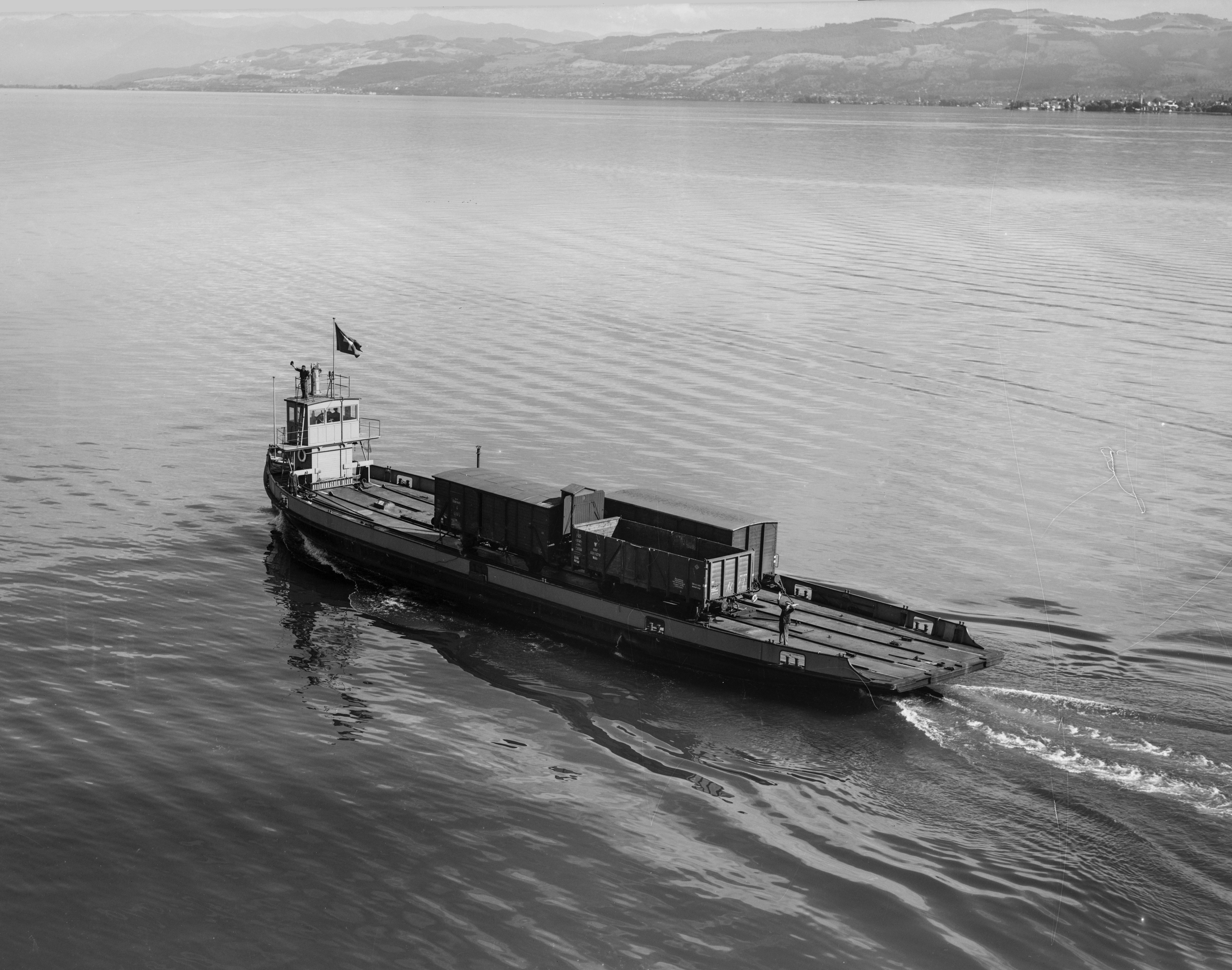
Motor train ferry of the Swiss Federal Railways, 1954

Only two years after the scrapping of the Lindau steam train ferries, the first new motor train ferry, the Schussen was put into operation in Friedrichshafen. In the 1930s, some older train ferries were motorised and some were still in use until 1966. Other motor train ferries followed with the Romanshorn in 1958 and the Rorschach in 1966. With the discontinuation of train ferry operations in 1976, these three double-ended ferries were converted into car ferries. Car ferry operations between Friedrichshafen and Romanshorn have continued to this day.
