= High Rhine Railway =

Railway line in Germany and Switzerland

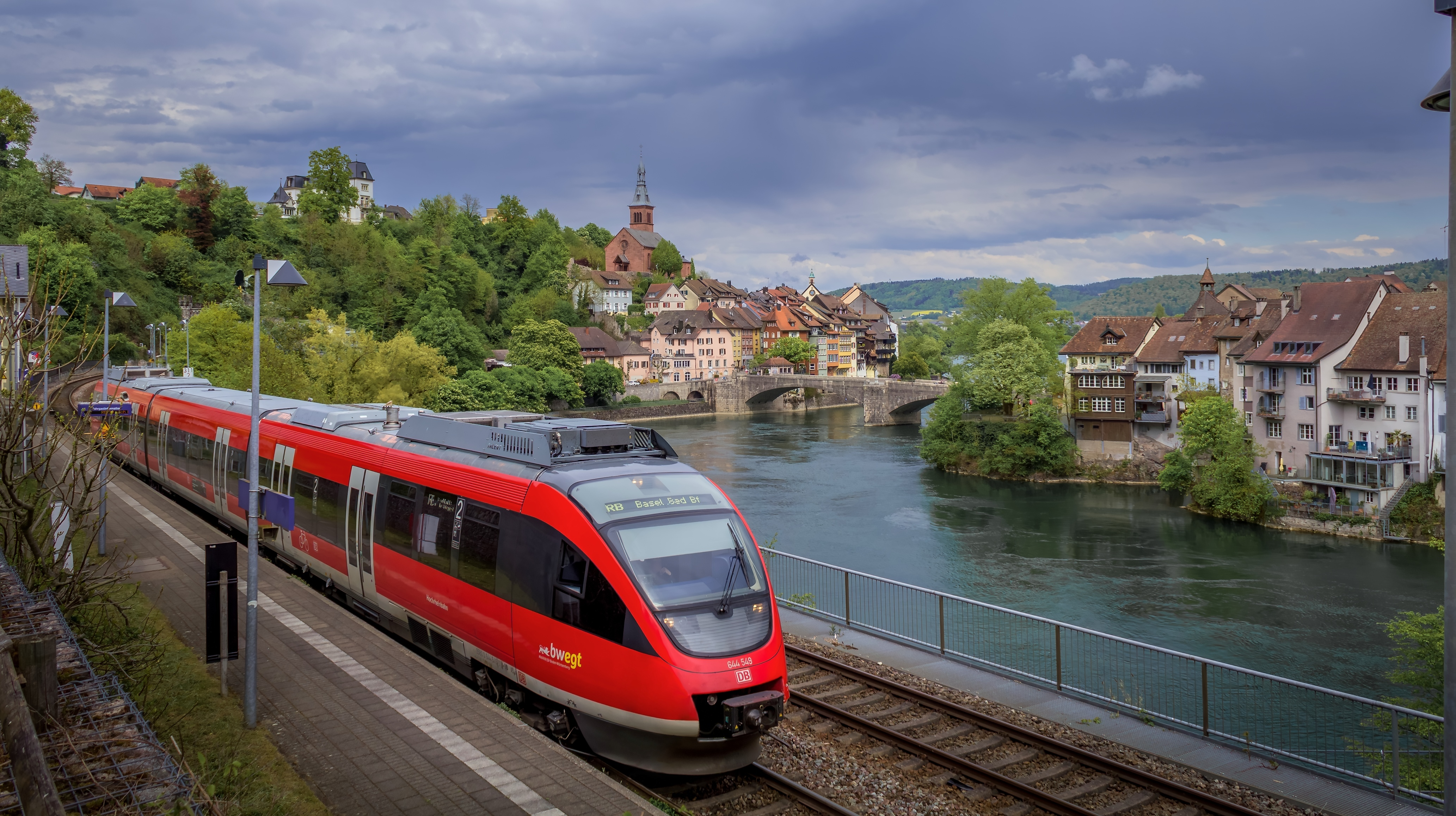
- Deutsche Bahn trainset in Laufenburg

Overview
- Native name: Hochrheinbahn
- Owner: DB InfraGO, BEV, SBB Infrastruktur (Basel-Stadt, Schaffhausen)
- Line number: 730 (DB); Erzingen (Baden)–Kreuzlingen: 763 (SBB CFF FFS)
- Locale: Baden-Württemberg, Germany; Basel-City and Schaffhausen, Switzerland
- Termini: Basel Bad Bf; Konstanz
- Stations: 45

Service
- Type: Suburban railway (IRE, RE, S-Bahn)
- System: DB; Tri-national S-Bahn Basel; OSTWIND
- Route number: 4000
- Operator(s): DB Regio, SBB GmbH, Thurbo

Technical
- Line length: 144.3 km (89.7 mi)
- Track gauge: 1,435 mm (4 ft 8 1/2 in) standard gauge
- Electrification: expected 2027

The High Rhine Railway (German: Hochrheinbahn) is a Deutsche Bahn railway line from Basel Badischer Bahnhof in the city of Basel to Konstanz on Lake Constance. It was built by the Grand Duchy of Baden State Railways as part of the Baden Mainline, which follows the Rhine upstream from Mannheim Hauptbahnhof to Konstanz. The line derives its name from the High Rhine (Hochrhein), which it follows between Basel and Waldshut and on a short section in Schaffhausen.

The line crosses the Germany–Switzerland border three times and passes through Swiss territory two times within the canton of Basel-Stadt and whilst crossing the main part of the canton of Schaffhausen. The other sections of the line run through the German state of Baden-Württemberg. Schaffhausen station is congruemtly owned by Deutsche Bahn (DB) and SBB Infrastructure, while the line is operated throughout by DB, and parts by SBB GmbH and Thurbo.

== History ==
The High Rhine Railway was opened on 4 February 1856 from Basel Bad Bf to Bad Säckingen and extended to Waldshut on 30 October 1856. Construction then stopped for a while, but on 15 June 1863, the whole line to Konstanz (Constance) was completed. Meanwhile, the Turgi–Koblenz–Waldshut railway was opened on 18 August 1859, connecting to the Swiss railway network across the Rhine at Koblenz. On 1 July 1871, the Swiss Northeastern Railway (NOB) opened the Lake Line section between Romanshorn and Konstanz. On 17 July 1875, the Swiss National Railway (SNB) opened the Winterthur–Etzwilen railway, Etzwilen–Konstanz/Kreuzlingen Hafen railway and Etzwilen–Singen railway lines, which connect to the High Rhine railway line in Konstanz and Singen, respectively.

The whole line — including the sections on Swiss territory — was owned under treaty by Baden State Railways and still belongs to Deutsche Bahn. The 1852 treaty allows Switzerland to reclaim ownership of the section on Swiss territory on five year's notice. Although this possibility was discussed after the First World War, it was never implemented. In the Second World War, cross-border traffic was severely limited and military traffic did not pass through Switzerland. In 1944/45, four pairs of passenger services each day ran all the way between Basel Bad Bf and Singen. In the timetable, however, it was expressly stated: "transit through the canton of Schaffhausen only permitted with passport with exemption (visa)". Between 8 June 1945 and 1 August 1953 the German railway infrastructure in Switzerland was managed by a trust authority established by the Swiss Federal Council.

Between 1873 and 1899, train ferries operated from Konstanz over Lake Constance to ports in Germany and Austria.

== Route ==
The railway follows the High Rhine upstream between Basel and Waldshut. It crosses the Germany-Switzerland border for the first time between Basel and Grenzach-Wyhlen. East of Waldshut, the tracks divert from the river and run in northeastward direction towards Klettgau valley. It crosses the German-Swiss border between Erzingen and Trasadingen. The highest elevation is reached near Beringerfeld. At the eastern end of Klettgau valley, the line runs through Engi, a narrow valley between Beringen and Neuhausen. Between Neuhausen and Schaffhausen, the line approaches the High Rhine and follows it for a short distance before turning northwards just south of Schaffhausen station, again diverting from the river. The line then runs in northeastward direction and crosses the Swiss-German border between Thayngen and Bietingen. Passing through the Hegau region, the line turns southeastwards east of Singen. It runs along the western shore of the Bodanrück peninsula, along the Gnadensee part of Lower Lake Constance. Shortly before reaching Konstanz, its eastern terminus, the line crosses the Seerhein over the Old Rhine Bridge.

The scenic route along the river includes towns with historic town centers, such as Rheinfelden, Laufenburg, Waldshut, Schaffhausen, Radolfzell and Konstanz. The Rhine Falls (Rheinfall) can also be seen on route.

== Infrastructure ==
Since 1987, most of the route has been double-tracked; only the section between Waldshut and Erzingen and a very short section in Konstanz, between Konstanz-Petershausen and Kostanz station, is single tracked. The section between Laufenburg and Murg was duplicated a few years ago.

The line is 143 kilometres (89 mi) long and standard gauge. As of 2024, the line between Basel Bad Bf and Erzingen is not electrified, whilst the rest of the line (between Erzingen and Constance) is electrified at 15 kV 16.7 Hz AC supplied by overhead line. The state of Baden-Württemberg and the canton of Schaffhausen have been asked to fund electrification of the part of the route between Basel Badischer Bahnhof and Schaffhausen. In 2013, the section between Erzingen and Schaffhausen was electrified. There are plans to electrify the entire line in the near future.

== Operations ==
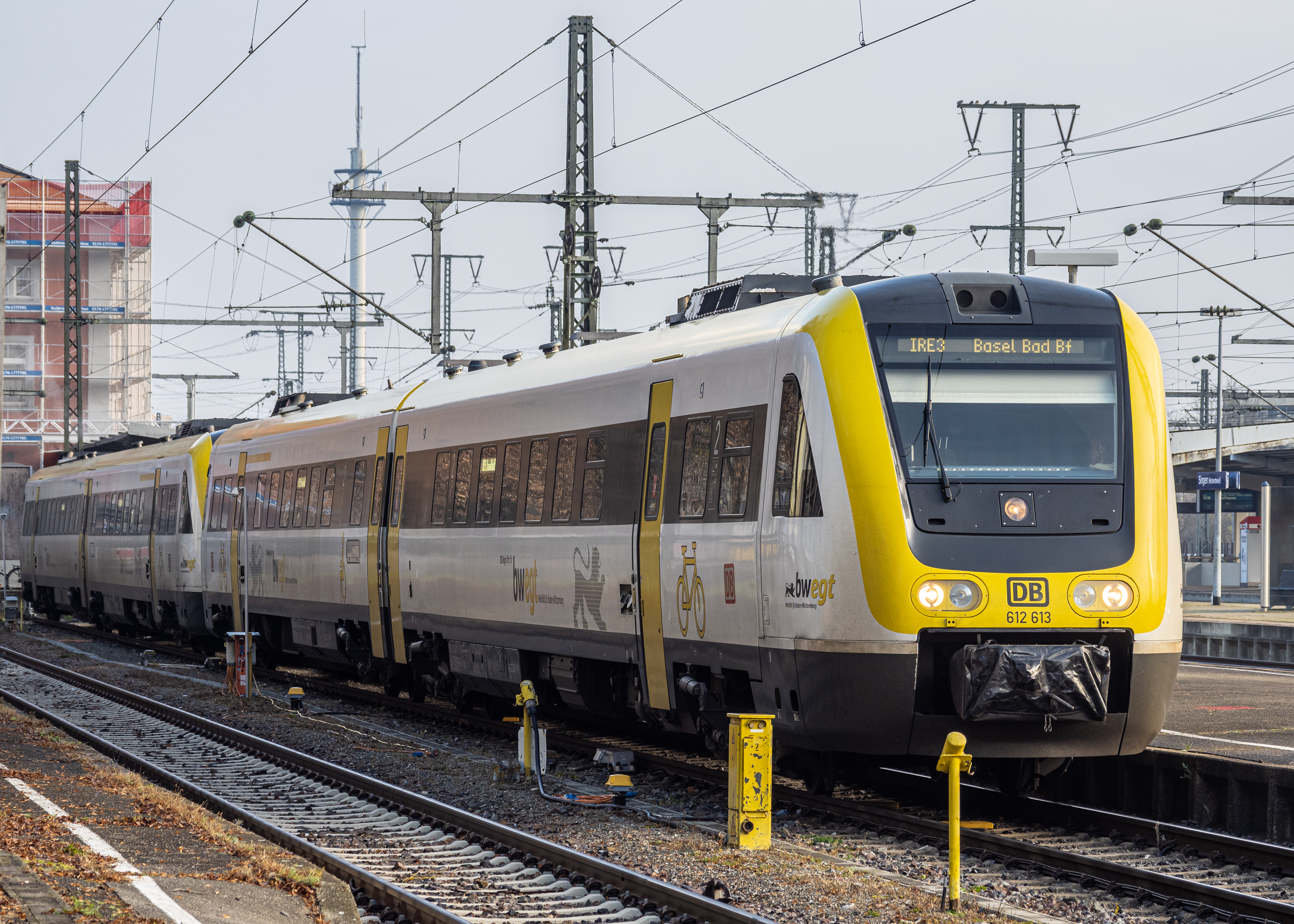
Diesel powered trainset (class 612 tilting train) of bwegt operating as IRE3 service to Basel Bad Bf

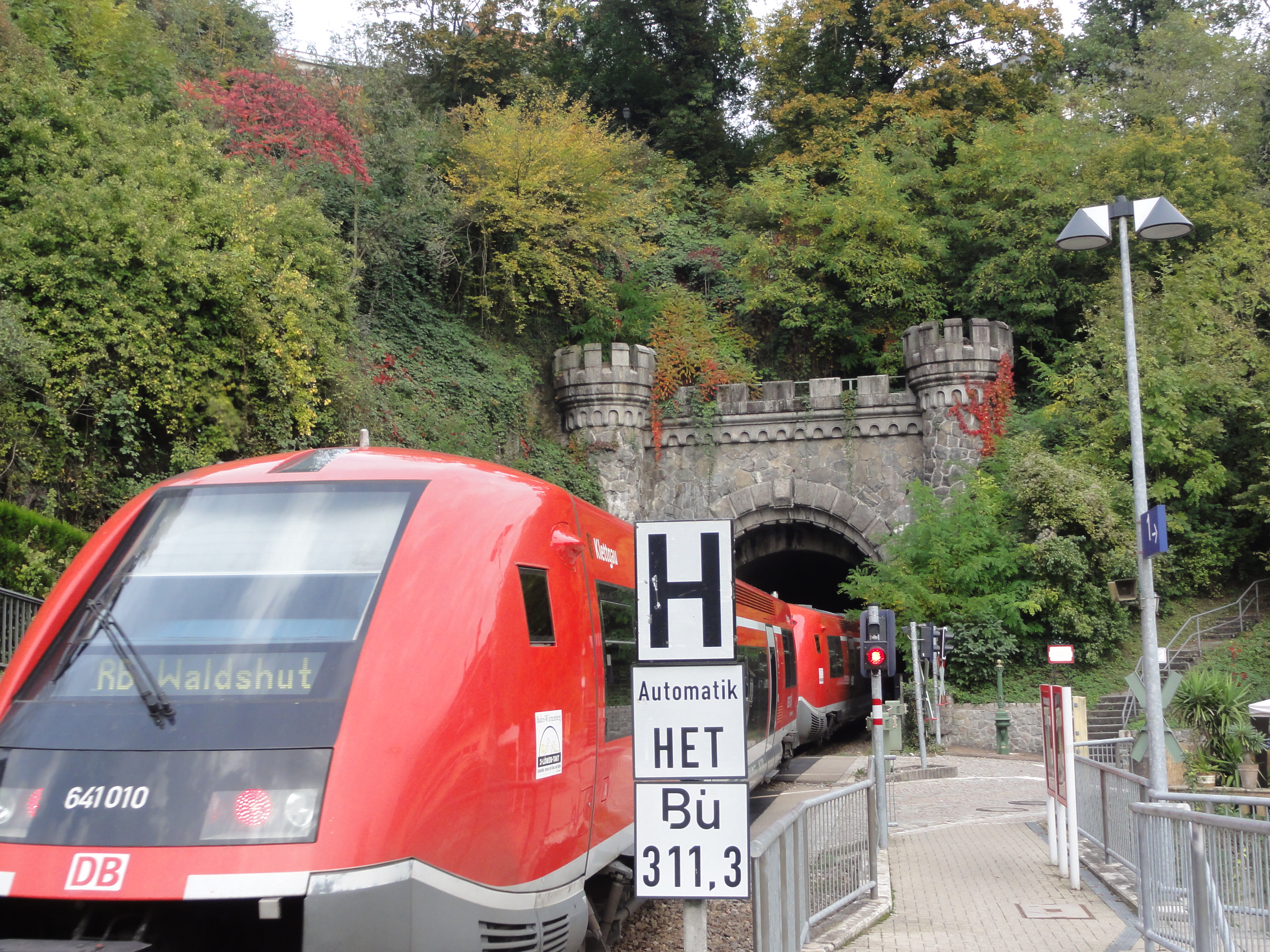
Class 641 trainset of DB operating as RB (now RB30) service entering Rappenstein Tunnel near Laufenburg (Baden)

Up to the 1990s, express services ran from Basel Bad Bf, or Freiburg, to Lindau-Insel, with some continuing to München Hbf. As of the December 2024 timetable change, the route is served by Regional-Express (RE) trains, RE 3 (until 2024 an Interregio-Express, IRE), on the Basel Bad Bf–Singen and Basel Bad Bf–Friedrichshafen Hafen (previously until Ulm Hauptbahnhof) routes. A Regionalbahn (RB), RB30, runs hourly between Basel Bad Bf and Waldshut, with most trains continuing to Lauchringen. During peak hour, services between Basel and Waldshut run every half-hour. DMUs are used on this section. At Basel Bad Bf, connections exist to the S6 to Zell (Wiesental) and Basel SBB, RB 27 to Karlsruhe Hauptbahnhof and RB 35 to Offenburg. Most of these regional services are part of the tri-national Basel S-Bahn.

The section between Waldshut and Lauchringen is used by the RB 37, which continues northwards to Weizen/Stühlingen on the Wutach Valley Railway line. The S27 of Aargau S-Bahn and S36 of Zürich S-Bahn use a short section of the line east of Waldshut before crossing the Rhine on the Turgi–Koblenz–Waldshut railway line.

Since 2013, EMUs of Thurbo operate as S64 of Schaffhausen S-Bahn between Erzingen and Schaffhausen. Between Schaffhausen and Singen (Hohentwiel), more than one train an hour operate during the day. This section is operated by the S62 of Schaffhausen S-Bahn and S24 of Zürich S-Bahn (until 2015 by the S22 service) in addition to InterCity (IC) trains, IC 87, running between Zürich HB and Stuttgart Hbf. EMUs are used on this section since its electrification in 1989. In Schaffhausen. the line connects with the Rheinfall Railway line (linking it with the Eglisau–Neuhausen railway line) and the Lake Line.

Between Singen and Konstanz, Regional-Express (RE) service RE 2 and SBB GmbH's Seehas (S6) operate. In Singen, they continue northwards on the Black Forest Railway. In Singen, the line also connects with the Etzwilen–Singen railway line, which is a heritage railway since 2007. Between 1913 and 1966, it also connected with the now dismantled Randen Railway (Randenbahn) to Beuren-Büßlingen. In Radolfzell, the line connects with the Radolfzell–Mengen railway line, which links it with the Stahringen–Friedrichshafen railway line.

Konstanz station is close to the Germany–Switzerland border. Towards South, the line merges with the Lake Line (with branches in both directions). From Konstanz station, there are connections to the S14 and S44 of St. Gallen S-Bahn, a RegioExpress (RE), RE1, as well as InterRegio (IR) trains of Swiss Federal Railways.

The section between Waldshut and Basel is mainly used by commuters in the industrial conurbation of Basel. The section of the line in the canton of Schaffhausen, Switzerland, and adjacent German towns has its own services operated by the Swiss Federal Railways' subsidiaries SBB GmbH and Thurbo (in addition to the S24). The section between Schaffhausen and Singen, which connects the Gäubahn and the Swiss rail network and carries significant long-distance passenger and freight traffic. On the section between Singen and Konstanz, local services operate as part of Bodensee S-Bahn, while IRE services connect with Karlsruhe.

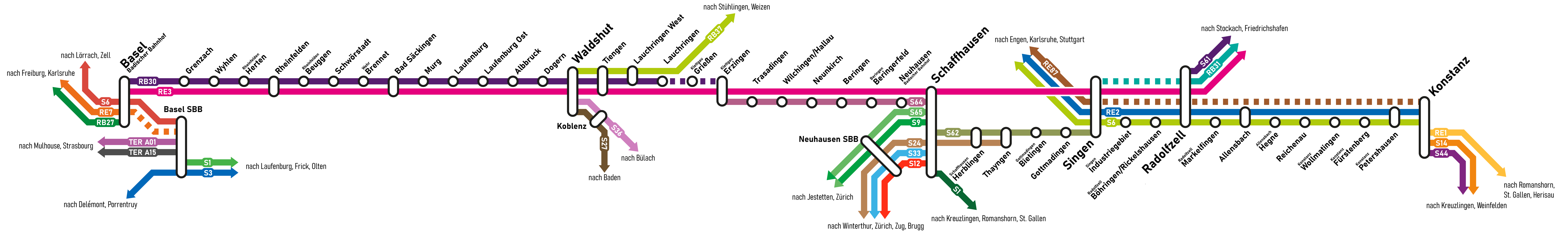
Services using the High Rhine Railway line (as of December 2023)

=== Future ===
A long-distance service between Basel and Herisau, via St. Gallen, is scheduled to begin operations with the December 2027 timetable change. This service, named the Hochrhein-Bodensee-Express (HBE, lit. 'High Rhine-Lake Constance Express'), will be operated by SBB GmbH, Swiss Federal Railways' German subsidiary. It will use the entire High Rhine Railway line and continue over the Lake Line to Romanshorn and from there over the Bodensee-Toggenburg railway line until Herisau. It will replace the RE1 (Konstanz–Herisau). Before the HBE can be introduced, the section between Basel Bad Bf and Erzingen will be electrified.
