= Schaffhausen S-Bahn =

Rail network in Germany and Switzerland

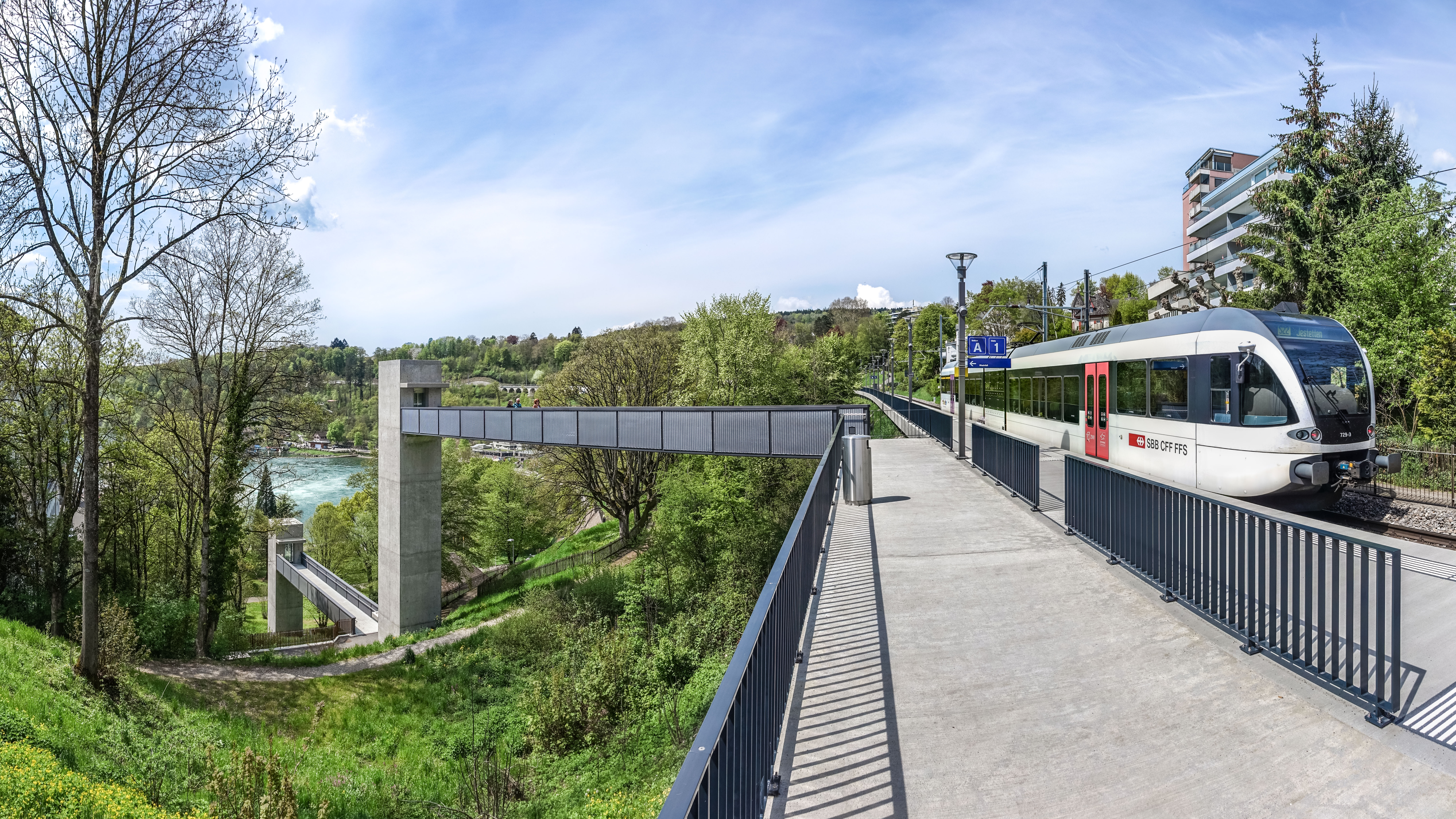
- Thurbo trainset operating as S65 at Neuhausen Rheinfall

Overview
- Native name: German: S-Bahn Schaffhausen
- Transit type: S-Bahn
- Number of lines: 3
- Line number: S62, S64, S65
- Number of stations: 16

Operation
- Began operation: 2015
- Operators: SBB GmbH; Thurbo

The Schaffhausen S-Bahn is an S-Bahn network in the Swiss canton of Schaffhausen and the German state of Baden-Württemberg (Konstanz and Waldshut districts). It comprises three services and began operation in 2015. Services are operated by SBB GmbH, Swiss Federal Railways' German subsidiary, and Thurbo.

Regional railway services in the city of Schaffhausen and other nearby towns are complemented by services of Zürich S-Bahn (S9, S12, S24, S29, S33), St. Gallen S-Bahn (S1), the Seehas (S6), and RB30 of Basel S-Bahn. The system is also supported by bus routes of vbsh.

== Lines ==
As of December 2023 the network consists of the following lines (S62 is also part of Bodensee S-Bahn):

- S62: Schaffhausen – Thayngen – Singen (Hohentwiel), using the High Rhine Railway line (some trains continue from Singen non-stop to Radolfzell)
- S64: Schaffhausen – Beringen Bad Bf – Erzingen (Baden), using the High Rhine Railway line
- S65: Schaffhausen – Neuhausen – Jestetten, using the Eglisau–Neuhausen railway and Rheinfall Railway lines

== History and future projects ==
Before operations began, several structural measures had to be taken on the existing railway system, such as the electrification of the line between Schaffhausen and Erzingen, replacement of level crossings with bridges in Neuhausen am Rheinfall and Beringen, refurbishing of the station in Jestetten, and the constructions of the new railway stations Beringerfeld and Neuhausen Rheinfall.

The line to Erzingen opened with the timetable change in December 2013 and the line to Jestetten in December 2015. The regional service to Singen (Hohentwiel) was taken over by EMUs of SBB GmbH/THURBO in 2022 (until then operated by DMUs of DB Regio Baden-Württemberg). The name Rhyhas (lit. 'Rhine hare'; in reference to the Seehas) was chosen by vote for this line. With the 10 December 2023 timetable change the three existing S-Bahn routes gained numbers (until then just an "S" without number was indicated on displays).

Hemishofen and Ramsen, situated in the eastern part of the canton of Schaffhausen, are located along the Etzwilen–Singen railway line, which is a heritage railway since 2007. There are currently no concrete plans to reactivate this line for scheduled passenger trains.

Altenburg-Rheinau railway station on the Eglisau–Neuhausen railway line was closed in 2010. There are presently no plans to reopen it.

== See also ==
- Rail transport in Germany
- Rail transport in Switzerland
