= Erzingen (Baden) station =

Railway station in Germany

Erzingen (Baden)
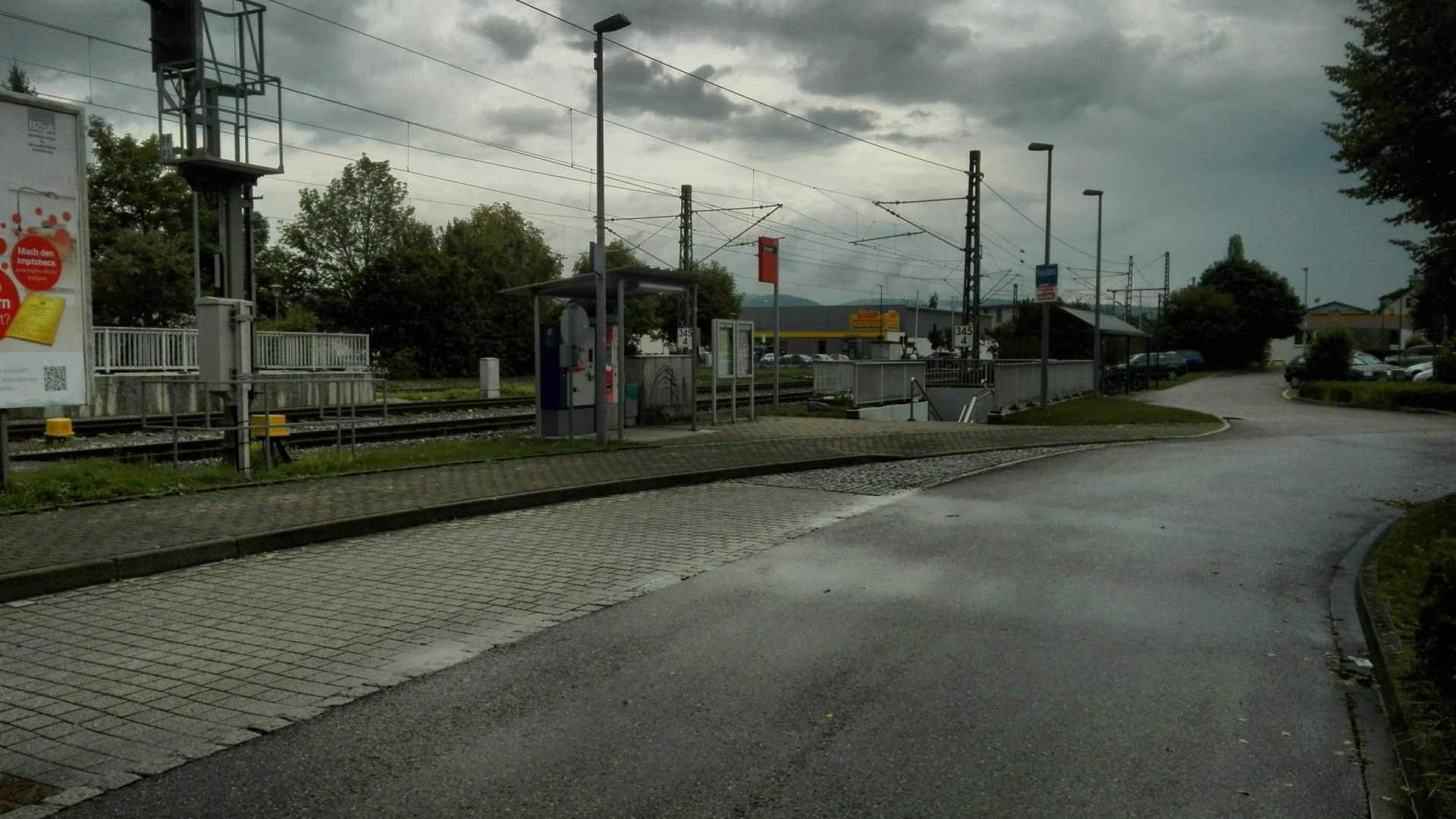
- The station in 2017

General information
- Location: Hauptstraße 78; Klettgau, Baden-Württemberg; Germany
- Coordinates: 47°39′34″N 8°25′48″E
- Owner: DB Netz
- Operator: DB Station&Service
- Lines: High Rhine Railway (KBS 730)
- Distance: 345.6 km (214.7 mi) from Mannheim Hauptbahnhof
- Platforms: 1 island platform; 1 side platform
- Tracks: 3
- Train operators: DB Regio Baden-Württemberg; SBB GmbH
- Connections: Südbadenbus bus lines

Other information
- Station code: 1669
- DS100 code: RERZ
- IBNR: 8001865
- Category: 4
- Fare zone: 4 (WTV), 840 and 848 - Ostwind

Services
| Preceding station | DB Regio Baden-Württemberg | Following station |
|---|---|---|
| Tiengen (Hochrhein) towards Basel Bad Bf | RE 3 | Schaffhausen towards Friedrichshafen Hafen |
| Preceding station | Schaffhausen S-Bahn | Following station |
| Terminus | S64 | Trasadingen towards Schaffhausen |
| Preceding station | Basel S-Bahn | Following station |
| Grießen (Baden) towards Basel Bad Bf | RB30 | Terminus |
Location
- Location within Baden-Württemberg Location within Germany

Erzingen (Baden) station is a railway station in the Erzingen district of the municipality of Klettgau, located in the Waldshut district in Baden-Württemberg, Germany. The station is located very close to the German border with Switzerland and is the first stop in Germany for passengers travelling away from Schaffhausen and towards Basel.

== History ==
The station building was completed in 1863.

The railway line from Erzingen to Schaffhausen was electrified and tracks along almost the entire route were doubled, allowing for more frequent services to run. The electrification of the line from Erzingen to Waldshut as well as from Waldshut on to Basel Badischer Bahnhof has also been agreed on and is planned.

== Train services ==
As of the December 2023 timetable change, the following services stop at Erzingen (Baden):

- Regional-Express RE 3: hourly service between Basel Bad Bf and Singen (Hohentwiel); every other train continues from Singen to Ulm Hauptbahnhof.
- Regionalbahn RB 30/RB30: some trains between Erzingen and Basel Bad Bf.
- Schaffhausen S-Bahn S64: half-hourly service to Schaffhausen.

The station is a border station and as such is in local transport tariff zones in both Germany and Switzerland.

== Customs ==
Erzingen is, for customs purposes, a border station for passengers arriving from Switzerland. Customs checks may be performed in Erzingen station or on board trains by German officials. Systematic passport controls were abolished when Switzerland joined the Schengen Area in 2008.

== Station services ==
The station building was partially refurbished in 2018. A hotel, café-bakery and dental practice are located in the building.

== See also ==
- Rail transport in Germany
