= Friedrichshafen Hafen station =

Railway station in Germany

Friedrichshafen Hafen
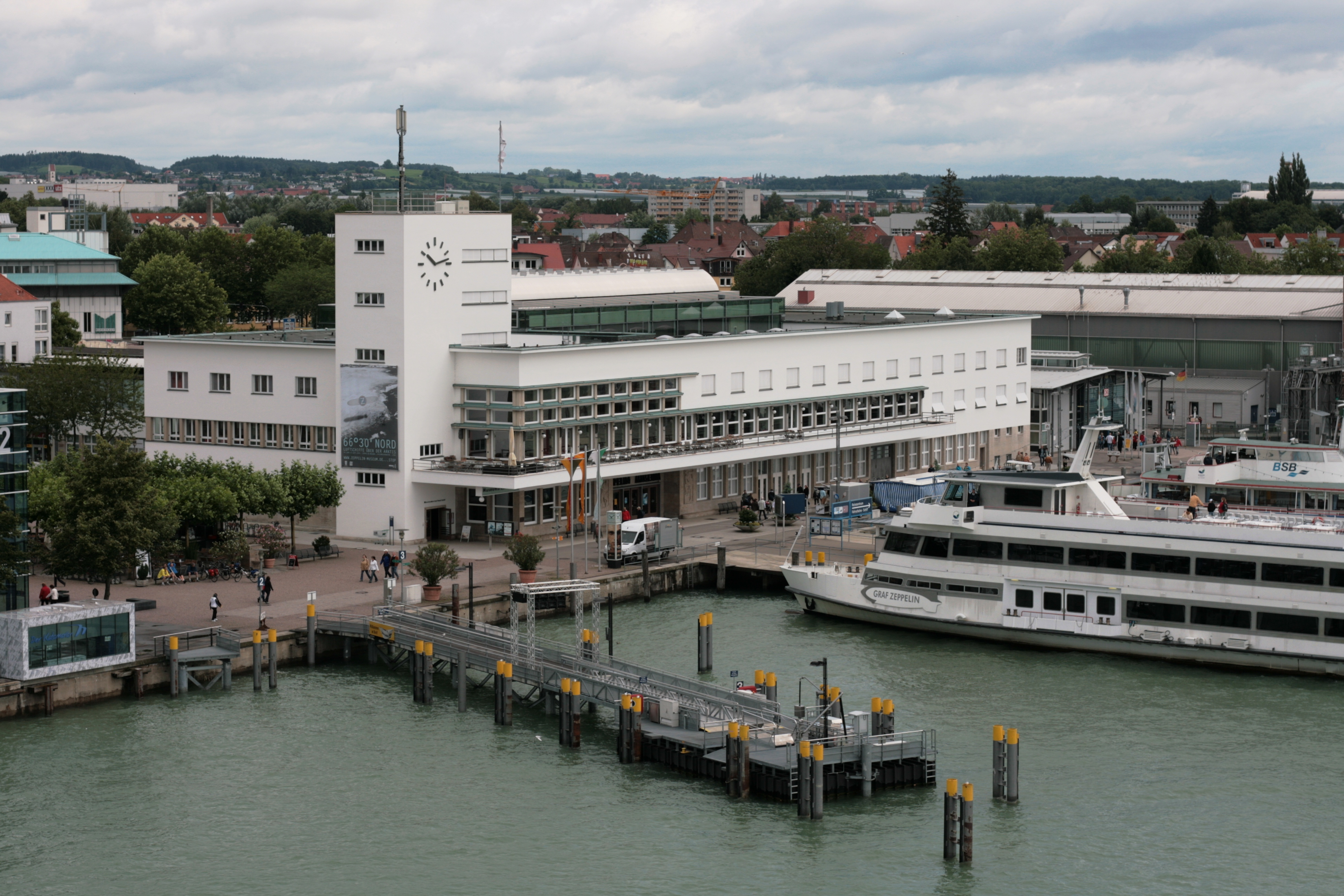
- Former entrance building (now Zeppelin Museum)

General information
- Location: Eisenbahnstraße 1, Friedrichshafen, Baden-Württemberg; Germany
- Coordinates: 47°39′02″N 9°28′59″E
- Line: Friedrichshafen Stadt–Friedrichshafen Hafen (km 7.8)
- Platforms: 2

Construction
- Accessible: No
- Architect: Karl Hagenmayer
- Architectural style: Bauhaus

Other information
- Station code: 1945
- DS100 code: TFH
- IBNR: 8002110
- Category: 5
- Fare zone: bodo: 10
- Website: www.bahnhof.de

History
- Opened: 1850; 176 years ago

Services
Preceding station	DB Regio Baden-Württemberg	Following station
Friedrichshafen Stadt towards Basel Bad Bf	RE 3	Terminus
Friedrichshafen Stadt towards Radolfzell	RB 31	Terminus
Preceding station	Bodensee-Oberschwaben-Bahn	Following station
Friedrichshafen Stadt towards Aulendorf	RB 91	Terminus
Location
- Location within Germany Location within Baden-Württemberg

Friedrichshafen Hafen station (Friedrichshafen Port station; German: Bahnhof Friedrichshafen Hafen or Hafenbahnhof Friedrichshafen) is a station in Friedrichshafen in the German state of Baden-Württemberg. It was opened on 1 June 1850 and served as a port station for the train ferry over Lake Constance to Romanshorn until 1976 and is still used for passenger services by Deutsche Bahn and Bodensee-Oberschwaben-Bahn (BOB). Today Friedrichshafen Hafen station is administered as a part of the Friedrichshafen Stadt station (Stadtbahnhof), to which it is connected by the Friedrichshafen Stadt–Friedrichshafen Hafen railway.

== History ==
After Friedrichshafen became the first city on Lake Constance to have a railway connection in 1847, the Württemberg Southern Railway was extended by 1849 from the city station to the port to allow the direct transhipment of goods from the boats onto trains, significantly reducing transport costs. In 1850, the first harbour terminal was added to the east pediment of the former salt warehouse (Salzstadel) and customs office. A train ferry service was established to the east of the port station in 1869 to connect with the railway from Romanshorn to Zürich, which was opened in 1855. A new building with a half-timbered facade and bay windows facing the lake was built in place of the first simple station in 1885/86. Upstairs in the new building was a restaurant with a terrace and, until 1909, a post office.

The quarter around the port station was substantially rebuilt from 1929 to 1933. The freight yard was relocated to the northern part of the city and then a new entrance building was built in the International Style to the plans of Karl Hagenmayer of the Reichsbahndirektion Stuttgart (Stuttgart rail division). This building was badly damaged in air raids in 1944, but was rebuilt after the Second World War in its original form. After Friedrichshafen had increasingly lost its importance as a railway location after the Second World War, the rail ferry service to Romanshorn was closed in 1976. The track and ancillary equipment lying to the east of the entrance building that had served the ferry has been removed in the subsequent years. The station building has retained its function and was sold to the city in 1988. After a new terminal building for the railway, customs and ferry operations was built on the ferry plaza, the former station building was rebuilt from 1993 to 1996 as the Zeppelin Museum. The track layout has been considerably simplified since the mid-1970s.

In addition to changes to the layout of the entrance building and the station's track layout, there have been repeated changes over the years to the adjacent port. Today numerous other ports on Lake Constance can be reached by ferry and the car ferry to Romanshorn.

== Rail services ==
The station now has two platform tracks (tracks 2b and 3b) on an island platform and a platform-free siding (track 4b). The 38 cm-high platform is 353 metres long, of which, however, only 133 m is usable. All other sidings and platform track 1b have been dismantled.

Services run over the line between Friedrichshafen Hafen station and Friedrichshafen Stadt station every 30 minutes. This is made up mainly of hourly IRE 3 services to Friedrichshafen Stadt (half of which continue to Radolfzell) and the hourly trains of the Bodensee-Oberschwaben-Bahn (BOB) from Friedrichshafen Hafen via the Ulm–Friedrichshafen railway to Aulendorf. The RB services are part of Bodensee S-Bahn.

Train class	Line	Interval
RE 3	Friedrichshafen Hafen – Friedrichshafen Stadt – Überlingen – Radolfzell – Singen – Basel Bad	Some trains
RB 31	Radolfzell – Überlingen – Markdorf (Baden) – Friedrichshafen Stadt – Friedrichshafen Hafen	Hourly
RB 91	Friedrichshafen Hafen – Friedrichshafen Stadt – Ravensburg – Aulendorf	Hourly

== Gallery ==
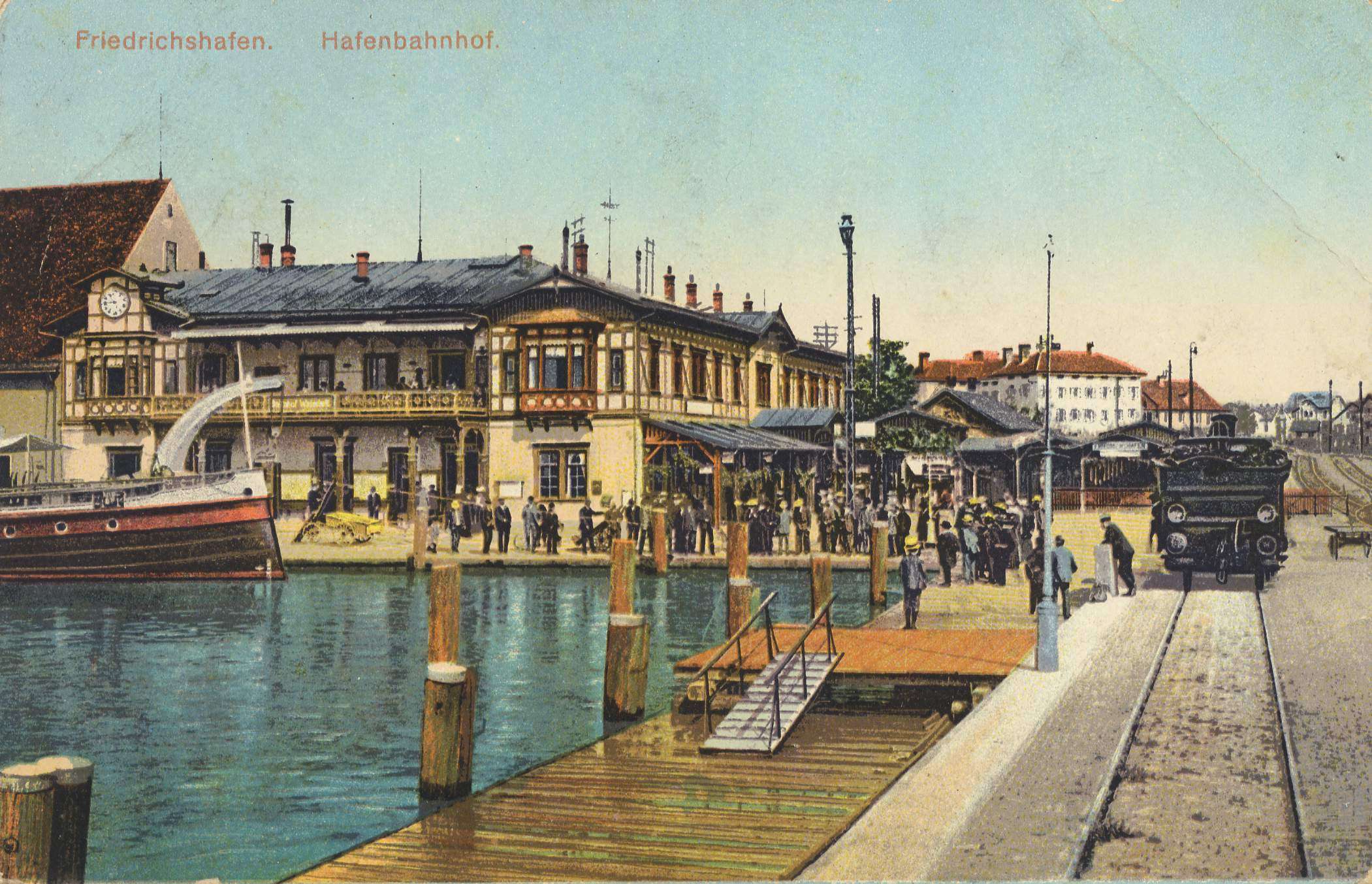
Port station in about 1900 (from the south)

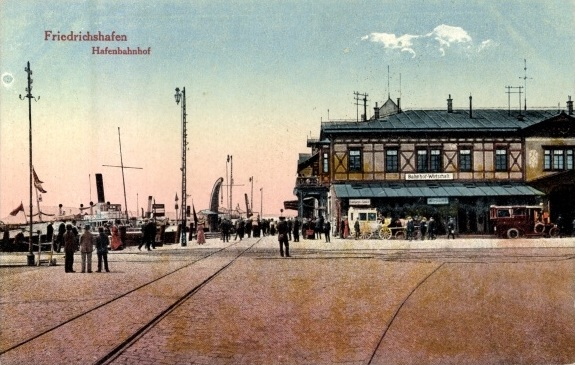
Port station in about 1900 (from the east)

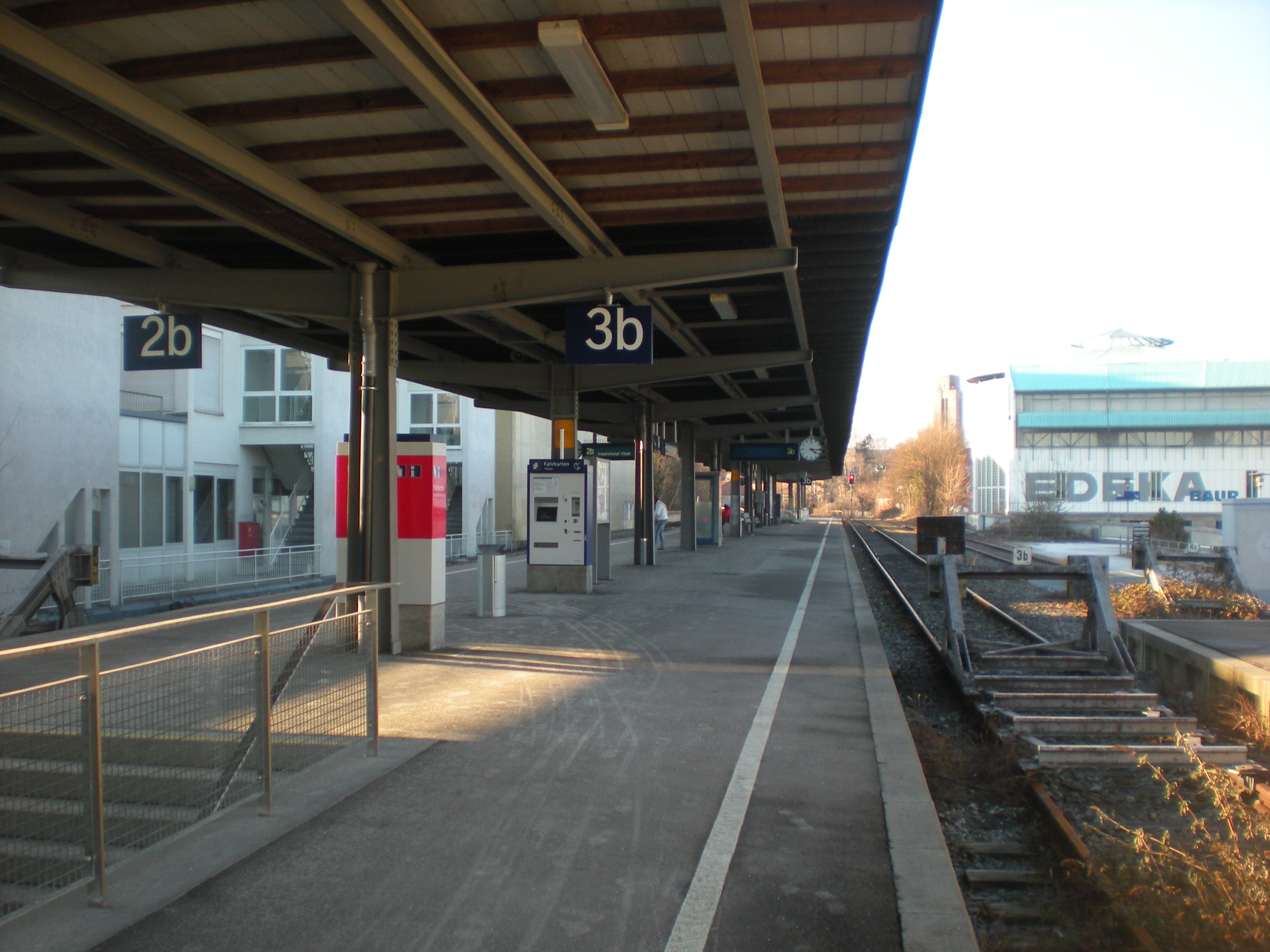
Platform of the port station

== See also ==
- Rail transport in Germany
