= Federal Railway Property Agency =

Coordinates: 50.705298°N 7.137374°E

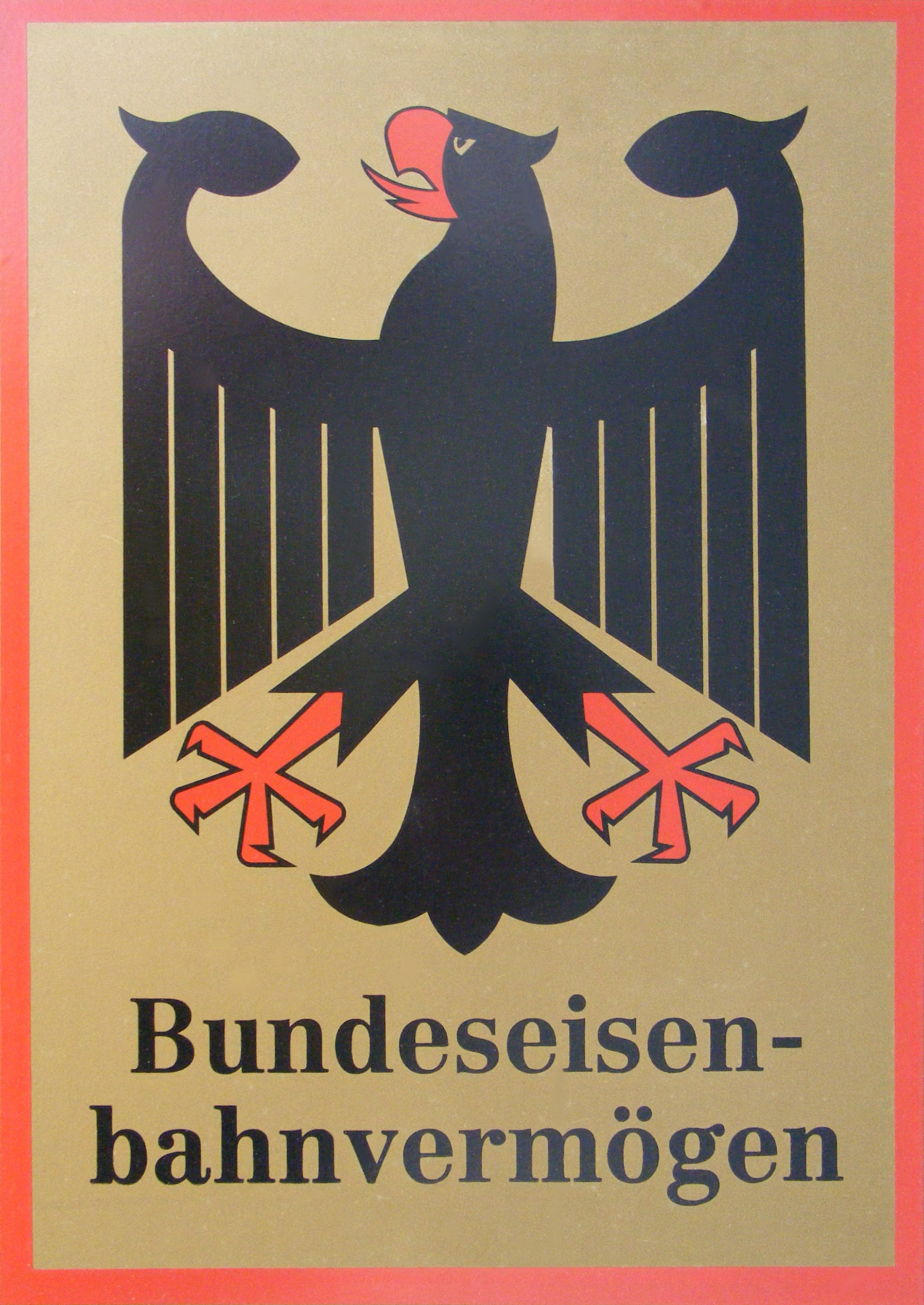
Shield of Bundeseisenbahnvermögen

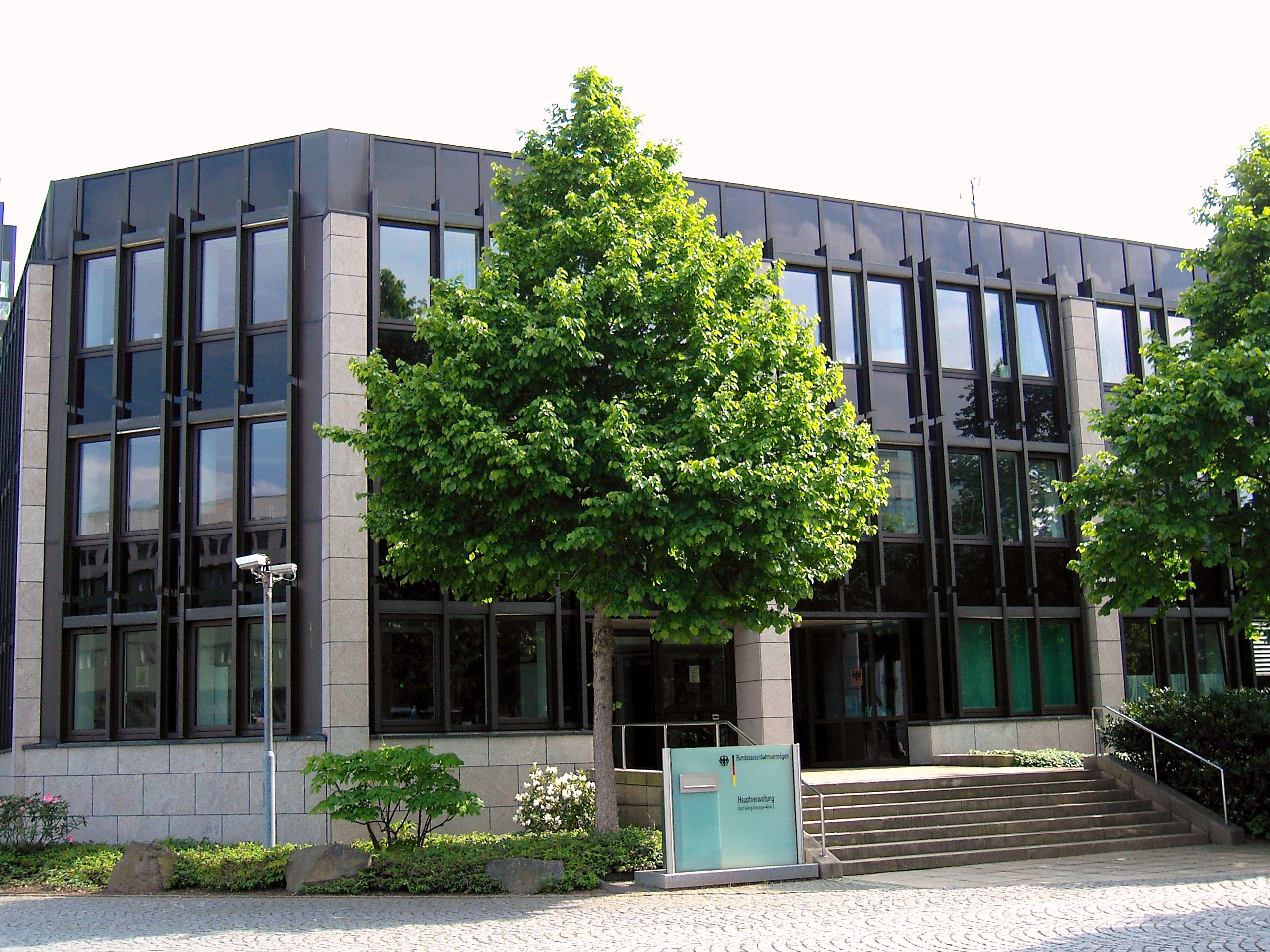
Central offices, Kurt-Georg-Kiesinger-Allee, Bonn.

The Federal Railway Property Agency (Bundeseisenbahnvermögen (BEV)), is a German federal agency that bundles state tasks from which the Deutsche Bahn, which is in competition, is to be permanently relieved. In this way, it contributes to the implementation of the Railway Reform.

The agency was called into existence by the Eisenbahnneuordnungsgesetz (ENeuOG; Railway Re-organisation Act) dated December 27, 1993. With its current budget of €7.7 billion, it is administered by the Federal Transport Ministry and the Federal Finance Ministry. The BEV is the superior authority of all civil servants formerly belonging to the Deutsche Bundesbahn and the Deutsche Reichsbahn. It also is responsible for the pension handling of about 400,000 former railway employees and manages the railway servant health insurance fund. Its head offices are located in Bonn, while several regional offices can be found all over Germany, divided by the region they serve: East (Berlin), Central (Frankfurt am Main with branch in Saarbrücken), North (Hanover with branch in Hamburg), South West (Karlsruhe with branch in Stuttgart), West (Köln with branch in Essen) and Southern Germany (Munich with branch in Nuremberg). 138 people are employed at the BEV's head office, 791 at the various branches. Including civil-servants delegated to Deutsche Bahn to serve in their former positions, the BEV has (2020) a staff of about 1,900.

Until his death on December 5, 2006, the president of the BEV was Rolf Heine. Since August 1, 2009, Marie-Theres Nonn is president of the BEV.

== See also ==
- BRB (Residuary) Limited, the entity formed when British Rail was dissolved
