= List of cultural property of national significance in Switzerland: Zurich =

This list contains all cultural property of national significance (class A) in the canton of Zürich from the 2009 Swiss Inventory of Cultural Property of National and Regional Significance. It is sorted by municipality and contains 204 individual buildings, 66 collections, 50 archaeological finds and 3 other, special sites or objects.

The geographic coordinates provided are in the Swiss coordinate system as given in the Inventory.

== Adlikon ==
KGS No.^{?}	Picture	Name	Street Address	CH1903 X coordinate	CH1903 Y coordinate	Location
10506	Thurbrücke (Thur Bridge, shared with Ossingen)	Thurbrücke (Thur Bridge, shared with Ossingen)		696.637	273.123	47.60167°N 8.723681°E

== Affoltern am Albis ==
KGS No.^{?}	Picture	Name	Street Address	CH1903 X coordinate	CH1903 Y coordinate	Location
11777	Collection Center of the Swiss National Museums	Collection Center of the Swiss National Museums	Lindenmoosstrasse 3	676.219	235.865	47.269284°N 8.445847°E

== Andelfingen ==
KGS No.^{?}	Picture	Name	Street Address	CH1903 X coordinate	CH1903 Y coordinate	Location
10063	Haldenmühle with Outbuildings	Haldenmühle with Outbuildings	Landstrasse 80	693.402	272.499	47.596527°N 8.680539°E
Unknown		ISOS Dorf: Andelfingen				

== Bäretswil ==
KGS No.^{?}	Picture	Name	Street Address	CH1903 X coordinate	CH1903 Y coordinate	Location
7393	Former Cotton mill	Former Cotton mill	Neuthal	707.730	246.330	47.359007°N 8.864691°E
7394	Greifenberg, Former Castle Site	Greifenberg, Former Castle Site		707.740	244.900	47.346146°N 8.864479°E
Unknown		ISOS Spezialfall: Neuthal				

== Bauma ==
KGS No.^{?}	Picture	Name	Street Address	CH1903 X coordinate	CH1903 Y coordinate	Location
9504	Flarz with Freddi House	Flarz with Freddi House	Undelstrasse 29–37	707.088	248.728	47.380677°N 8.856768°E
Unknown		ISOS Verstädtertes Dorf: Bauma				
Unknown		ISOS Weiler: Wellenau				
Unknown		ISOS Spezialfall: Blitterswil / Juckeren				

== Berg am Irchel ==
KGS No.^{?}	Picture	Name	Street Address	CH1903 X coordinate	CH1903 Y coordinate	Location
11655	Ebersberg Part of the late-Roman era Rhine Fortifications	Ebersberg; Part of the late-Roman era Rhine Fortifications		685.810	269.635	47.571808°N 8.579054°E
Unknown		ISOS Dorf: Berg am Irchel				

== Bülach ==
KGS No.^{?}	Picture	Name	Street Address	CH1903 X coordinate	CH1903 Y coordinate	Location
Unknown		ISOS Kleinstadt / Flecken: Bülach				
Unknown		ISOS Spezialfall: Spinnerei Jakobsthal				

== Bubikon ==
KGS No.^{?}	Picture	Name	Street Address	CH1903 X coordinate	CH1903 Y coordinate	Location
7411	Ritterhaus Former Knights Hospitaller Commandry	Ritterhaus; Former Knights Hospitaller Commandry	Ritterhaus 35	705.166	235.976	47.266307°N 8.828331°E

== Dägerlen ==
KGS No.^{?}	Picture	Name	Street Address	CH1903 X coordinate	CH1903 Y coordinate	Location
Unknown		ISOS Weiler: Dägerlen				

== Dinhard ==
KGS No.^{?}	Picture	Name	Street Address	CH1903 X coordinate	CH1903 Y coordinate	Location
Unknown		ISOS Dorf: Kirchdinhard				

== Dübendorf ==
KGS No.^{?}	Picture	Name	Street Address	CH1903 X coordinate	CH1903 Y coordinate	Location
8554	Flieger Flab Museum	Flieger Flab Museum	Überlandstrasse 255	690.009	250.375	47.398043°N 8.630964°E
11775		Military History Collection (Shared with Burgdorf and Thun)	Überlandstrasse	689.573	250.595	47.400081°N 8.625234°E
7433	Werkstattgebäude 1 Workshop Building 1	Werkstattgebäude 1 Workshop Building 1	Rechweg	689.874	250.655	47.400579°N 8.629232°E

== Dürnten ==
KGS No.^{?}	Picture	Name	Street Address	CH1903 X coordinate	CH1903 Y coordinate	Location
7434	Swiss Reformed Church	Swiss Reformed Church	Oberdürntnerstrasse	706.260	237.310	47.278129°N 8.8431°E

== Eglisau ==
KGS No.^{?}	Picture	Name	Street Address	CH1903 X coordinate	CH1903 Y coordinate	Location
7439	Gasthof Zum Hirschen	Gasthof Zum Hirschen	Untergass 28	681.751	269.962	47.575267°N 8.525177°E
7440	Swiss Reformed Church	Swiss Reformed Church	Chilengass	681.800	269.950	47.575153°N 8.525826°E
9707	Rhinsberg, Late-Bronze Age Hilltop Settlement / Early Modern Watch Tower	Rhinsberg, Late-Bronze Age Hilltop Settlement / Early Modern Watch Tower		682.595	268.220	47.559496°N 8.53607°E
Unknown		ISOS Kleinstadt / Flecken: Eglisau				

== Elgg ==
KGS No.^{?}	Picture	Name	Street Address	CH1903 X coordinate	CH1903 Y coordinate	Location
7443	Swiss Reformed Church with Rectory	Swiss Reformed Church with Rectory	Lindenplatz	707.660	260.910	47.490132°N 8.867277°E
7444	Elgg Castle with Surrounding Buildings	Elgg Castle with Surrounding Buildings	Lindenplatz	707.570	260.160	47.483402°N 8.865902°E
Unknown		ISOS Kleinstadt / Flecken: Elgg with Schloss				

== Erlenbach ==
KGS No.^{?}	Picture	Name	Street Address	CH1903 X coordinate	CH1903 Y coordinate	Location
10374	Swiss Reformed Church	Swiss Reformed Church	Seestrasse	687.188	239.671	47.302157°N 8.591518°E

== Fehraltorf ==
KGS No.^{?}	Picture	Name	Street Address	CH1903 X coordinate	CH1903 Y coordinate	Location
7452	Rüti, Earthen Fortifications	Rüti, Earthen Fortifications		698.220	248.970	47.384234°N 8.739407°E

== Feuerthalen ==
KGS No.^{?}	Picture	Name	Street Address	CH1903 X coordinate	CH1903 Y coordinate	Location
Unknown		ISOS Verstädtertes Dorf: Feuerthalen				

== Flaach ==
KGS No.^{?}	Picture	Name	Street Address	CH1903 X coordinate	CH1903 Y coordinate	Location
Unknown	Chrumben, Early Medieval Cemetery	Chrumben, Early Medieval Cemetery				
7458	Flaach Castle with Wine Press and Fountain	Flaach Castle with Wine Press and Fountain	Schloss 396	687.689	270.287	47.577424°N 8.604151°E

== Flurlingen ==
KGS No.^{?}	Picture	Name	Street Address	CH1903 X coordinate	CH1903 Y coordinate	Location
10051	Stantenwegtrotte	Stantenwegtrotte	Stanten-Weg	689.647	282.358	47.685707°N 8.632611°E

== Freienstein-Teufen ==
KGS No.^{?}	Picture	Name	Street Address	CH1903 X coordinate	CH1903 Y coordinate	Location
11659	Tössegg-Schlössliacker, Part of the late-Roman era Rhine Fortifications	Tössegg-Schlössliacker, Part of the late-Roman era Rhine Fortifications		684.235	267.270	47.550744°N 8.557677°E
Unknown		ISOS Spezialfall: Oberteufen with Castle				

== Glattfelden ==
KGS No.^{?}	Picture	Name	Street Address	CH1903 X coordinate	CH1903 Y coordinate	Location
10376	Klingelehaus (Gottfried-Keller-Zentrum)	Klingelehaus (Gottfried-Keller-Zentrum)	Gottfried-Keller-Strasse 8	679.833	268.118	47.55892°N 8.499357°E
7466	NOK Eglisau – Rheinsfelden Power Plant	NOK Eglisau – Rheinsfelden Power Plant	Zollstrasse	677.848	269.861	47.574833°N 8.473291°E
11673	Zweidlen-Schlossbuck, Part of the late-Roman era Rhine Fortifications	Zweidlen-Schlossbuck, Part of the late-Roman era Rhine Fortifications		677.310	268.385	47.561623°N 8.465885°E
Unknown		ISOS Dorf: Glattfelden				

== Gossau ==
KGS No.^{?}	Picture	Name	Street Address	CH1903 X coordinate	CH1903 Y coordinate	Location
7472	Dürsteler House	Dürsteler House	Grüningerstrasse 150	701.285	239.002	47.294127°N 8.777738°E
7471	Swiss Reformed Church	Swiss Reformed Church	Bergstrasse	700.116	239.746	47.300997°N 8.762452°E

== Greifensee ==
KGS No.^{?}	Picture	Name	Street Address	CH1903 X coordinate	CH1903 Y coordinate	Location
7473	Reformed Church (Gallus Chapel)	Reformed Church (Gallus Chapel)	Im Städtli	693.531	246.745	47.364907°N 8.676854°E
Unknown	Greifensee Castle	Greifensee Castle	Im Städtli	693.440	246.758	47.365037°N 8.675652°E
7474	Storen, lake shore settlement	Storen, lake shore settlement				
Unknown	ISOS Kleinstadt / Flecken: Greifensee	ISOS Kleinstadt / Flecken: Greifensee				

== Grüningen ==
KGS No.^{?}	Picture	Name	Street Address	CH1903 X coordinate	CH1903 Y coordinate	Location
Unknown	ISOS Kleinstadt / Flecken: Grüningen	ISOS Kleinstadt / Flecken: Grüningen				

== Hausen am Albis ==
KGS No.^{?}	Picture	Name	Street Address	CH1903 X coordinate	CH1903 Y coordinate	Location
Unknown		ISOS Weiler: Husertal				
Unknown		ISOS Weiler: Tüfenbach				

== Henggart ==
KGS No.^{?}	Picture	Name	Street Address	CH1903 X coordinate	CH1903 Y coordinate	Location
7484	Schlossbuck, Earthen Fortification	Schlossbuck, Earthen Fortification		694.210	269.030	47.565217°N 8.690545°E

== Herrliberg ==
KGS No.^{?}	Picture	Name	Street Address	CH1903 X coordinate	CH1903 Y coordinate	Location
7486	Landhaus Schipf	Landhaus Schipf	Seestrasse 1	687.747	238.749	47.293791°N 8.598729°E
Unknown		ISOS Spezialfall: Landgut Schipf with Seeuferhang				

== Hittnau ==
KGS No.^{?}	Picture	Name	Street Address	CH1903 X coordinate	CH1903 Y coordinate	Location
Unknown		ISOS Weiler: Dürstelen				

== Hombrechtikon ==
KGS No.^{?}	Picture	Name	Street Address	CH1903 X coordinate	CH1903 Y coordinate	Location
Unknown		Feldbach, Neolithic and Early-Bronze Age lake shore settlement Seegubel				
9479	Hof Oberhaus	Hof Oberhaus	Seestrasse 2, 4	702.140	232.930	47.239389°N 8.78766°E
7498	Hürlimann House	Hürlimann House	Lützelsee 2, 4	701.406	235.028	47.25837°N 8.778441°E
7500	Country Estate Rosenberg	Country Estate Rosenberg	Alte Landstrasse 1, 3	701.697	232.741	47.237757°N 8.781768°E
10377	Menzi House	Menzi House	Lützelsee 3	701.355	235.024	47.258342°N 8.777766°E
7503	Swiss Reformed Church	Swiss Reformed Church	Oetwilerstrasse	700.330	234.420	47.253066°N 8.764091°E
7501	Egli House	Egli House	Lutikon 1–3	700.494	234.904	47.257394°N 8.766366°E
Unknown		ISOS Weiler: Lützelsee				
Unknown		ISOS Spezialfall: Feldbach / Schirmensee				

== Horgen ==
KGS No.^{?}	Picture	Name	Street Address	CH1903 X coordinate	CH1903 Y coordinate	Location
7509	Former Sust (Warehouse)	Former Sust (Warehouse)	Bahnhofstrasse 27	687.857	235.115	47.261093°N 8.599472°E
7511	Country Estate Bocken	Country Estate Bocken	Hauptgebäude, Bockenweg	688.889	233.116	47.242977°N 8.612711°E
10442	Parks around Villa Stünzi	Parks around Villa Stünzi	Seestrasse 229	688.415	234.741	47.257655°N 8.60677°E
7513	Swiss Reformed Church	Swiss Reformed Church	Kirchstrasse	687.673	234.920	47.259364°N 8.597003°E
9131	Herner Lake Pavillon	Herner Lake Pavillon	Seegartenstrasse	687.259	235.506	47.264689°N 8.591648°E
10052	Agenten House	Agenten House	Seestrasse 175	687.944	234.976	47.259832°N 8.600594°E
Unknown		ISOS Verstädtertes Dorf: Horgen				
Unknown		ISOS Spezialfall: Landgut Bocken				

== Hüttikon ==
KGS No.^{?}	Picture	Name	Street Address	CH1903 X coordinate	CH1903 Y coordinate	Location
7516	Straw Thatched House	Straw Thatched House	Oetwilerstrasse 12	671.480	255.390	47.445416°N 8.386343°E

== Illnau-Effretikon ==
KGS No.^{?}	Picture	Name	Street Address	CH1903 X coordinate	CH1903 Y coordinate	Location
7518	Former Farm House, Known as Hablützelhaus	Former Farm House, Known as Hablützelhaus	Horbenerstrasse 9	698.568	252.173	47.412987°N 8.74472°E
10490	Swiss Reformed Church of Effretikon	Swiss Reformed Church of Effretikon	Rebbuckstrasse	694.368	253.793	47.428171°N 8.689419°E

== Kappel am Albis ==
KGS No.^{?}	Picture	Name	Street Address	CH1903 X coordinate	CH1903 Y coordinate	Location
7521	Former Cistercian Monastery	Former Cistercian Monastery	Kappelerhof	682.285	231.247	47.227023°N 8.525153°E
Unknown		ISOS Weiler: Hauptikon				
Unknown		ISOS Spezialfall: Kappel / Näfenhüser				

== Kilchberg ==
KGS No.^{?}	Picture	Name	Street Address	CH1903 X coordinate	CH1903 Y coordinate	Location
9171	Corporate Archives of Lindt & Sprüngli AG	Corporate Archives of Lindt & Sprüngli AG	Seestrasse 204	684.242	241.300	47.31719°N 8.552874°E

== Kleinandelfingen ==
KGS No.^{?}	Picture	Name	Street Address	CH1903 X coordinate	CH1903 Y coordinate	Location
9531	Zur Friedau House	Zur Friedau House	Schaffhauserstrasse 3	693.491	272.630	47.597693°N 8.681749°E

== Knonau ==
KGS No.^{?}	Picture	Name	Street Address	CH1903 X coordinate	CH1903 Y coordinate	Location
Unknown		ISOS Weiler: Hinteruttenberg				

== Küsnacht ==
KGS No.^{?}	Picture	Name	Street Address	CH1903 X coordinate	CH1903 Y coordinate	Location
9484	Lux Guyer's house «Sunnebüel»	Lux Guyer's house «Sunnebüel»	Am Itschnacherstich 1	687.691	242.420	47.326813°N 8.598705°E
10443	Vogel-Sulzer Garden	Vogel-Sulzer Garden	Zur Letzi 25	688.400	242.975	47.33171°N 8.608193°E
8537	Town Museum	Town Museum	Tobelweg 1	686.817	241.343	47.317243°N 8.586936°E
11686	Villa Streiff	Villa Streiff	Zürichstrasse 21	685.882	242.811	47.330568°N 8.574852°E
7536	Carl Jung's House	Carl Jung's House	Seestrasse 228	686.520	240.609	47.310681°N 8.582867°E
7532	Tithe Press	Tithe Press	Theodor-Brunner-Weg 4	686.240	241.120	47.315313°N 8.579263°E

== Kyburg ==
KGS No.^{?}	Picture	Name	Street Address	CH1903 X coordinate	CH1903 Y coordinate	Location
7537; 9711	Medieval / Early Modern Castle and Village	Medieval / Early Modern Castle and Village		698.380	257.220	47.458402°N 8.743341°E
Unknown		ISOS Dorf: Kyburg				

== Laufen-Uhwiesen ==
KGS No.^{?}	Picture	Name	Street Address	CH1903 X coordinate	CH1903 Y coordinate	Location
9505	Former Municipal Meeting House	Former Municipal Meeting House	Dorfstrasse 16	689.758	280.696	47.670747°N 8.633753°E
Unknown	ISOS Spezialfall: Laufen Castle	ISOS Spezialfall: Laufen Castle	Rheinfallweg	688.343	281.322	47.676568°N 8.61504°E

== Lindau ==
KGS No.^{?}	Picture	Name	Street Address	CH1903 X coordinate	CH1903 Y coordinate	Location
9289	Production and Warehouse Buildings for the Maggi AG Company	Production and Warehouse Buildings for the Maggi AG Company	Winterthurerstrasse	695.456	256.398	47.451441°N 8.704394°E

== Männedorf ==
KGS No.^{?}	Picture	Name	Street Address	CH1903 X coordinate	CH1903 Y coordinate	Location
7547	Villa Alma with Surrounding Buildings	Villa Alma with Surrounding Buildings	Seestrasse 80	694.197	234.707	47.25655°N 8.683142°E

== Marthalen ==
KGS No.^{?}	Picture	Name	Street Address	CH1903 X coordinate	CH1903 Y coordinate	Location
7551	House, Known as the Altes Wirtshaus	House, Known as the Altes Wirtshaus	Schaffhauserstrasse 3	691.074	275.761	47.626188°N 8.650259°E
Unknown		ISOS Dorf: Marthalen				
Unknown		ISOS Weiler: Ellikon am Rhein				

== Maschwanden ==
KGS No.^{?}	Picture	Name	Street Address	CH1903 X coordinate	CH1903 Y coordinate	Location
Unknown		ISOS Dorf: Maschwanden				

== Meilen ==
KGS No.^{?}	Picture	Name	Street Address	CH1903 X coordinate	CH1903 Y coordinate	Location
11705	Feldmeilen-Vorderfeld, Neolithic and Bronze Age lake shore settlement	Feldmeilen-Vorderfeld, Neolithic and Bronze Age lake shore settlement		689.670	236.500	47.273306°N 8.6237°E
7561	Landsitz Seehalde with former Rental House	Landsitz Seehalde with former Rental House	Seestrasse 444	690.352	236.259	47.271045°N 8.632663°E
7562	Landsitz Seehof with Surrounding Buildings	Landsitz Seehof with Surrounding Buildings	Seestrasse 642	691.196	235.878	47.267503°N 8.643738°E
11711	Rohrenhab, Neolithic and Early-Bronze Age lake shore settlement	Rohrenhab, Neolithic and Early-Bronze Age lake shore settlement				
11711	Schellen, Neolithic and Bronze Age Lake Shore Settlement	Schellen, Neolithic and Bronze Age Lake Shore Settlement				
9134	House, Known as Breuer Lakehouse	House, Known as Breuer Lakehouse	Im Hausacher 35	688.823	237.619	47.283484°N 8.612729°E
Unknown		ISOS Weiler: Burg				

== Mettmenstetten ==
KGS No.^{?}	Picture	Name	Street Address	CH1903 X coordinate	CH1903 Y coordinate	Location
10081	Hof Rossau, House with Outbuildings	Hof Rossau, House with Outbuildings	Baarerstrasse 17	679.150	231.200	47.226984°N 8.483754°E
7571	House	House	Buechstock	679.110	234.370	47.255499°N 8.483783°E
Unknown		ISOS Weiler: Grossholz / Grüt				
Unknown		ISOS Weiler: Weissenbach				

== Neerach ==
KGS No.^{?}	Picture	Name	Street Address	CH1903 X coordinate	CH1903 Y coordinate	Location
Unknown		ISOS Dorf: Neerach				

== Neftenbach ==
KGS No.^{?}	Picture	Name	Street Address	CH1903 X coordinate	CH1903 Y coordinate	Location
7574	Wart Castle with Outbuildings and Park	Wart Castle with Outbuildings and Park	Wartgutstrasse 80	690.921	264.612	47.52595°N 8.645943°E

== Nürensdorf ==
KGS No.^{?}	Picture	Name	Street Address	CH1903 X coordinate	CH1903 Y coordinate	Location
7576	Swiss Reformed St. Oswald's Chapel	Swiss Reformed St. Oswald's Chapel	Hitzenbachstrasse	692.090	257.280	47.459852°N 8.659949°E

== Oberrieden ==
KGS No.^{?}	Picture	Name	Street Address	CH1903 X coordinate	CH1903 Y coordinate	Location
9506	Bindern House	Bindern House	Alte Landstrasse 79, 81	686.532	236.141	47.270496°N 8.582165°E

== Oberstammheim ==
KGS No.^{?}	Picture	Name	Street Address	CH1903 X coordinate	CH1903 Y coordinate	Location
9275	Alte Kanzlei Former Administration Building	Alte Kanzlei; Former Administration Building	Hauptstrasse 76	702.377	276.566	47.63176°N 8.800789°E
7584	Gasthaus (Combination Hotel and Restaurant) Hirschen	Gasthaus (Combination Hotel and Restaurant) Hirschen	Steigstrasse 4	702.414	276.598	47.632042°N 8.801289°E
7585	Swiss Reformed Galluskapelle	Swiss Reformed Galluskapelle	Chilenbückli	702.400	276.820	47.63404°N 8.801154°E
9811	Forge (Former Wine press Building)	Forge (Former Wine press Building)	Steigstrasse 6	702.425	276.612	47.632166°N 8.801438°E
Unknown		ISOS Dorf: Oberstammheim				

== Oetwil an der Limmat ==
KGS No.^{?}	Picture	Name	Street Address	CH1903 X coordinate	CH1903 Y coordinate	Location
Unknown	ISOS Dorf: Oetwil an der Limmat	ISOS Dorf: Oetwil an der Limmat				

== Ossingen ==
KGS No.^{?}	Picture	Name	Street Address	CH1903 X coordinate	CH1903 Y coordinate	Location
Unknown		De Chreebuck, Early Medieval Settlement and Graveyard				
7591	Thurbrücke (Thur Bridge, shared with Adlikon)	Thurbrücke (Thur Bridge, shared with Adlikon)		696.637	273.123	47.60167°N 8.723681°E
Unknown		ISOS Dorf: Ossingen				
Unknown		ISOS Weiler: Husen with Castle Wyden				

== Otelfingen ==
KGS No.^{?}	Picture	Name	Street Address	CH1903 X coordinate	CH1903 Y coordinate	Location
7596	Mill with Former Brewery	Mill with Former Brewery	Mühlegasse 2	671.550	257.414	47.463611°N 8.387595°E
Unknown		ISOS Dorf: Otelfingen				

== Pfäffikon ==
KGS No.^{?}	Picture	Name	Street Address	CH1903 X coordinate	CH1903 Y coordinate	Location
7598	Flarzhaus Ruetschberg	Flarzhaus Ruetschberg	Hohlgass 1–11	700.288	245.694	47.354462°N 8.766055°E
Unknown	ISOS Verstädtertes Dorf: Pfäffikon	ISOS Verstädtertes Dorf: Pfäffikon				
Unknown		ISOS Weiler: Hermatswil				

== Pfungen ==
KGS No.^{?}	Picture	Name	Street Address	CH1903 X coordinate	CH1903 Y coordinate	Location
7602	Villa Schlosshalde	Villa Schlosshalde	Dorfstrasse 14	690.499	263.487	47.515892°N 8.640112°E
Unknown		ISOS Dorf: Pfungen				

== Rafz ==
KGS No.^{?}	Picture	Name	Street Address	CH1903 X coordinate	CH1903 Y coordinate	Location
Unknown		ISOS Dorf: Rafz				

== Regensberg ==
KGS No.^{?}	Picture	Name	Street Address	CH1903 X coordinate	CH1903 Y coordinate	Location
7605	Engelfrid House	Engelfrid House	Oberburg 41	675.411	259.660	47.483379°N 8.439178°E
Unknown	ISOS Kleinstadt / Flecken: Regensberg	ISOS Kleinstadt / Flecken: Regensberg				

== Regensdorf ==
KGS No.^{?}	Picture	Name	Street Address	CH1903 X coordinate	CH1903 Y coordinate	Location
9733	Obere (Upper) Church and Reginli Chapel	Obere (Upper) Church and Reginli Chapel	Mühlestrasse	677.303	253.699	47.42955°N 8.463246°E
10084	Granary	Granary	Im Sand 7	678.470	255.050	47.441562°N 8.478949°E

== Rheinau ==
KGS No.^{?}	Picture	Name	Street Address	CH1903 X coordinate	CH1903 Y coordinate	Location
7608	Former Benedictine Abbey	Former Benedictine Abbey	Alt-Rheinau	687.900	277.500	47.642259°N 8.608383°E
9714	Rheinau Peninsula and Island, Celtic Oppidum Medieval / Early Modern Monastery and City Prehistoric Wall-Cemetery, later used as a Medieval City Wall	Rheinau Peninsula and Island, Celtic Oppidum; Medieval / Early Modern Monastery and City; Prehistoric Wall-Cemetery, later used as a Medieval City Wall		687.720	277.850	47.64543°N 8.606058°E
11677	Mannhausen, Part of the late-Roman era Rhine Fortifications	Mannhausen, Part of the late-Roman era Rhine Fortifications		689.560	278.070	47.64716°N 8.630586°E
7615		Strickboden, Köpferplatz, Part of the late-Roman era Rhine Fortifications		687.770	274.750	47.617547°N 8.60611°E
Unknown		ISOS Spezialfall: Rheinau with Monastery and Klinik				

== Richterswil ==
KGS No.^{?}	Picture	Name	Street Address	CH1903 X coordinate	CH1903 Y coordinate	Location
7616	Richterswil railway station	Richterswil railway station	Seestrasse 20	696.121	229.378	47.208347°N 8.707419°E
7618	Ruins of Alt Wädenswil Castle	Ruins of Alt Wädenswil Castle		694.360	229.880	47.213115°N 8.684284°E
9715	Samstagern, Early Modern Sconce	Samstagern, Early Modern Sconce		694.960	228.080	47.196841°N 8.691823°E
Unknown	ISOS Verstädtertes Dorf: Richterswil	ISOS Verstädtertes Dorf: Richterswil				
Unknown		ISOS Spezialfall: Mülenen				

== Rifferswil ==
KGS No.^{?}	Picture	Name	Street Address	CH1903 X coordinate	CH1903 Y coordinate	Location
7632	Farm House	Farm House	Jonenbachstrasse 42, 44	679.952	233.514	47.247699°N 8.494753°E
10085	Baer House	Baer House	Hauptikerstrasse 6	680.024	232.775	47.241044°N 8.495573°E
Unknown		ISOS Dorf: Oberrifferswil				

== Rorbas ==
KGS No.^{?}	Picture	Name	Street Address	CH1903 X coordinate	CH1903 Y coordinate	Location
7634	Steinbrücke	Steinbrücke		685.980	265.000	47.530105°N 8.580418°E

== Rümlang ==
KGS No.^{?}	Picture	Name	Street Address	CH1903 X coordinate	CH1903 Y coordinate	Location
7638	Kleinjogg-Hof	Kleinjogg-Hof	Katzenrüti 321	680.527	254.505	47.436412°N 8.506118°E

== Rüti ==
KGS No.^{?}	Picture	Name	Street Address	CH1903 X coordinate	CH1903 Y coordinate	Location
10086	Krematorium	Krematorium	Krematoriumstrasse 1	706.896	234.700	47.254554°N 8.850883°E
7648	Swiss Reformed Church, Former Monastery Church	Swiss Reformed Church, Former Monastery Church	Pfauenplatz	706.735	235.222	47.259275°N 8.848881°E
Unknown	ISOS Verstädtertes Dorf: Rüti with Untertann	ISOS Verstädtertes Dorf: Rüti with Untertann				

== Russikon ==
KGS No.^{?}	Picture	Name	Street Address	CH1903 X coordinate	CH1903 Y coordinate	Location
Unknown		ISOS Weiler: Gündisau				

== Schlieren ==
KGS No.^{?}	Picture	Name	Street Address	CH1903 X coordinate	CH1903 Y coordinate	Location
7651	Gas Plant of the City of Zürich	Gas Plant of the City of Zürich	Bernstrasse / Turmstrasse	677.376	250.643	47.402058°N 8.463684°E

== Seegräben ==
KGS No.^{?}	Picture	Name	Street Address	CH1903 X coordinate	CH1903 Y coordinate	Location
8603	Aathal Dinosaur Museum	Aathal Dinosaur Museum	Zürichstrasse / Unter Aathal 202	699.990	243.950	47.338823°N 8.761723°E
Unknown	ISOS Dorf: Seegräben	ISOS Dorf: Seegräben				
Unknown		ISOS Weiler: Ottenhusen				

== Stadel ==
KGS No.^{?}	Picture	Name	Street Address	CH1903 X coordinate	CH1903 Y coordinate	Location
Unknown		ISOS Dorf: Stadel				

== Stäfa ==
KGS No.^{?}	Picture	Name	Street Address	CH1903 X coordinate	CH1903 Y coordinate	Location
7661	House Zur Farb	House Zur Farb	Dorfstrasse 11–15	698.104	232.765	47.238516°N 8.734328°E
9507	Mies, Building Complex with Long House	Mies, Building Complex with Long House	Eichstrasse 1, 3	698.427	232.745	47.238288°N 8.738589°E
7664	Ritterhaus (Knight's House) and Chapel	Ritterhaus (Knight's House) and Chapel		699.827	232.339	47.234427°N 8.756986°E
9133	Villa Sunneschy	Villa Sunneschy	Seestrasse 156	698.180	232.282	47.234161°N 8.735226°E
Unknown		ISOS Verstädtertes Dorf: Oetikon				
Unknown		ISOS Weiler: Mutzmalen				

== Stallikon ==
KGS No.^{?}	Picture	Name	Street Address	CH1903 X coordinate	CH1903 Y coordinate	Location
10082	Mill and Surrounding Buildings	Mill and Surrounding Buildings	Aumüli	679.124	239.575	47.30231°N 8.484884°E
7666		Üetliberg, Prehistoric and Roman era Settlement		679.500	244.900	47.350155°N 8.490799°E

== Thalwil ==
KGS No.^{?}	Picture	Name	Street Address	CH1903 X coordinate	CH1903 Y coordinate	Location
9129	Jenny Castle with Outbuildings	Jenny Castle with Outbuildings	Mühlebachstrasse 51 B	685.293	238.523	47.29208°N 8.566246°E
7674	House am Gstad	House am Gstad	Seestrasse 135	685.331	239.086	47.297138°N 8.566855°E

== Trüllikon ==
KGS No.^{?}	Picture	Name	Street Address	CH1903 X coordinate	CH1903 Y coordinate	Location
Unknown		Hattlebuck, Hallstatt Culture Tumuli				
10337	Noble's House and Double Barn	Noble's House and Double Barn	Rudolfingen, Dorfstrasse	692.652	277.432	47.640993°N 8.671598°E
10083	Hofmeister House	Hofmeister House	Steig 2	692.653	277.500	47.641604°N 8.671625°E
Unknown		ISOS Dorf: Rudolfingen				

== Turbenthal ==
KGS No.^{?}	Picture	Name	Street Address	CH1903 X coordinate	CH1903 Y coordinate	Location
7681		Former Medicinal Spa Gyrenbad		706.120	256.634	47.45193°N 8.845828°E

== Uetikon am See ==
KGS No.^{?}	Picture	Name	Street Address	CH1903 X coordinate	CH1903 Y coordinate	Location
9041	Chemical Factory	Chemical Factory	Seestrasse 99	693.500	235.000	47.259284°N 8.673996°E

== Uitikon ==
KGS No.^{?}	Picture	Name	Street Address	CH1903 X coordinate	CH1903 Y coordinate	Location
11734	Üetliberg, Prehistoric and Roman era Settlement	Üetliberg, Prehistoric and Roman era Settlement		679.500	244.900	47.350155°N 8.490799°E

== Unterengstringen ==
KGS No.^{?}	Picture	Name	Street Address	CH1903 X coordinate	CH1903 Y coordinate	Location
9718	Glanzenberg, Medieval Ruins / Castle	Glanzenberg, Medieval Ruins / Castle		673.800	250.600	47.402081°N 8.416308°E
9719	Schanz, Early Modern Sconce	Schanz, Early Modern Sconce		673.500	250.650	47.402565°N 8.412343°E

== Unterstammheim ==
KGS No.^{?}	Picture	Name	Street Address	CH1903 X coordinate	CH1903 Y coordinate	Location
7693	Municipal Administration Building	Municipal Administration Building	Zur Delle	701.616	277.378	47.63918°N 8.790852°E
11662	Hof Girsperger	Hof Girsperger	Kellhofstrasse 8, 10	701.556	277.489	47.640187°N 8.790079°E
7696	Girsberger House	Girsberger House	Sennegasse 5	701.607	277.307	47.638543°N 8.790716°E
Unknown		ISOS Dorf: Unterstammheim				

== Uster ==
KGS No.^{?}	Picture	Name	Street Address	CH1903 X coordinate	CH1903 Y coordinate	Location
7698	Railway Station with two engine sheds	Railway Station with two engine sheds	Industriestrasse 1 A – C	696.711	245.254	47.351039°N 8.718623°E
7706	Reformierte Kirche	Reformierte Kirche	Zentralstrasse	696.600	244.670	47.345803°N 8.717029°E
10338	Gujer House	Gujer House	Wermatswil, Hintergasse 5	698.787	246.573	47.362593°N 8.746385°E
Unknown		ISOS Verstädtertes Dorf: Uster				
Unknown		ISOS Weiler: Freudwil				
Unknown		ISOS Weiler: Winikon				

== Wädenswil ==
KGS No.^{?}	Picture	Name	Street Address	CH1903 X coordinate	CH1903 Y coordinate	Location
7711	Farm House Obere Ödischwänd	Farm House Obere Ödischwänd	Ödischwändweg	691.520	231.075	47.224262°N 8.647041°E
7712	Hof Burstel (Double House with Outbuildings)	Hof Burstel (Double House with Outbuildings)	Burstel	689.830	231.210	47.225708°N 8.624757°E
7719	Hof Neuguet (House with Outbuildings)	Hof Neuguet (House with Outbuildings)	Neuguet	694.220	229.690	47.211426°N 8.682396°E
7710	Swiss Reformed Church	Swiss Reformed Church	Schönenbergstrasse 9	693.388	231.575	47.228497°N 8.671806°E

== Wald ==
KGS No.^{?}	Picture	Name	Street Address	CH1903 X coordinate	CH1903 Y coordinate	Location
11661	Binzholz Primary School	Binzholz Primary School	Schulhausstrasse 6	711.356	237.515	47.279133°N 8.910491°E
Unknown		ISOS Verstädtertes Dorf: Wald (ZH)				

== Waltalingen ==
KGS No.^{?}	Picture	Name	Street Address	CH1903 X coordinate	CH1903 Y coordinate	Location
Unknown		ISOS Dorf: Guntalingen				
Unknown		ISOS Dorf: Waltalingen with Castle Schwandegg				
Unknown		ISOS Weiler: Girsberg with Castle				

== Wallisellen ==
KGS No.^{?}	Picture	Name	Street Address	CH1903 X coordinate	CH1903 Y coordinate	Location
7731	Swiss Reformed Church	Swiss Reformed Church	Kirchstrasse	687.153	252.184	47.414695°N 8.593489°E

== Wangen-Brüttisellen ==
KGS No.^{?}	Picture	Name	Street Address	CH1903 X coordinate	CH1903 Y coordinate	Location
9066	Former Reception Building of the Civil Airport	Former Reception Building of the Civil Airport	Dübendorfstrasse	690.525	251.450	47.40764°N 8.638016°E
Unknown		ISOS Dorf: Wangen				

== Wasterkingen ==
KGS No.^{?}	Picture	Name	Street Address	CH1903 X coordinate	CH1903 Y coordinate	Location
Unknown		ISOS Dorf: Wasterkingen				

== Weiach ==
KGS No.^{?}	Picture	Name	Street Address	CH1903 X coordinate	CH1903 Y coordinate	Location
11679	Hardwald, Part of the late-Roman era Rhine Fortifications	Hardwald, Part of the late-Roman era Rhine Fortifications		676.450	269.400	47.570851°N 8.454633°E
10339	Church and Churchyard	Church and Churchyard	Büelstrasse 17	675.212	267.896	47.557469°N 8.437928°E
11678	Leebern, Part of the late-Roman era Rhine Fortifications	Leebern, Part of the late-Roman era Rhine Fortifications		675.000	268.625	47.564049°N 8.435235°E

== Wetzikon ==
KGS No.^{?}	Picture	Name	Street Address	CH1903 X coordinate	CH1903 Y coordinate	Location
7751	Swiss Reformed Church	Swiss Reformed Church	Bahnhofstrasse	702.780	242.640	47.326613°N 8.798333°E
7747	Robenhausen, Neolithic and Bronze Age lake shore settlement	Robenhausen, Neolithic and Bronze Age lake shore settlement		701.800	243.675	47.336073°N 8.785606°E

== Wiesendangen ==
KGS No.^{?}	Picture	Name	Street Address	CH1903 X coordinate	CH1903 Y coordinate	Location
7755	Swiss Reformed Church	Swiss Reformed Church	Dorfstrasse	701.740	264.270	47.521289°N 8.789501°E
Unknown		ISOS Dorf: Wiesendangen				

== Wila ==
KGS No.^{?}	Picture	Name	Street Address	CH1903 X coordinate	CH1903 Y coordinate	Location
7757	Ruins of Hohenlandenberg Castle	Ruins of Hohenlandenberg Castle		707.740	250.590	47.397315°N 8.865848°E
7756	Swiss Reformed Church	Swiss Reformed Church				

== Winkel ==
KGS No.^{?}	Picture	Name	Street Address	CH1903 X coordinate	CH1903 Y coordinate	Location
7758	Seeb, Roman era Estate	Seeb, Roman era Estate		683.150	260.930	47.493867°N 8.542082°E

== Winterthur ==
KGS No.^{?}	Picture	Name	Street Address	CH1903 X coordinate	CH1903 Y coordinate	Location
7836	Ruins of Alt-Wülflingen Castle	Ruins of Alt-Wülflingen Castle		694.140	261.760	47.49985°N 8.688078°E
7781	Old District Administration Building	Old District Administration Building	Lindstrasse 10	697.328	262.269	47.503963°N 8.730493°E
9721	Old City, Medieval / Early Modern City	Old City, Medieval / Early Modern City		697.210	261.700	47.498864°N 8.728803°E
7773	Former Spinning Mill Hard	Former Spinning Mill Hard	Hard 11	693.188	263.717	47.517584°N 8.675854°E
7772	Former Waaghaus	Former Waaghaus	Marktgasse 25	697.229	261.777	47.499553°N 8.729072°E
8612		Federal Gottfried Keller Foundation	Haldenstrasse 95	697.406	263.082	47.511263°N 8.731706°E
8476	Photography Museum	Photography Museum	Grüzenstrasse 44	697.976	261.416	47.496196°N 8.738906°E
8475	Photography Foundation of Switzerland	Photography Foundation of Switzerland	Grüzenstrasse 45	697.920	261.375	47.495836°N 8.738153°E
7760	Winterthur Hauptbahnhof (main station)	Winterthur Hauptbahnhof (main station)	Bahnhofplatz 5–9	696.822	261.809	47.499901°N 8.723678°E
7793	Zum Warteck House	Zum Warteck House	Stadthausstrasse 39	697.399	261.868	47.500346°N 8.731348°E
7762	Hohland House	Hohland House	Hohlandstrasse 11	699.249	262.556	47.506257°N 8.756051°E
7761; 8535; 8969; 8474	Art Museum, Winterthur City Library, Special Collections and Natural History Museum	Art Museum, Winterthur City Library, Special Collections and Natural History Museum	Museumstrasse 52	697.300	262.035	47.501863°N 8.730071°E
7813	Locomotive Factory with Worker's Barracks	Locomotive Factory with Worker's Barracks	Zürcherstrasse 41	696.126	261.375	47.4961°N 8.714349°E
8807	Machinery Factory of Rieter AG, Historical Archives	Machinery Factory of Rieter AG, Historical Archives	Klosterstrasse 20	695.528	260.412	47.487527°N 8.706208°E
9290	Machinery Park of the Nagel Factory	Machinery Park of the Nagel Factory	St. Gallerstrasse 138	698.818	261.652	47.498192°N 8.75013°E
7767	Mörsburg	Mörsburg	Mörsburgstrasse 30	700.140	266.314	47.539916°N 8.768721°E
7765	Rathaus (Town council house)	Rathaus (Town council house)	Marktgasse 20	697.295	261.816	47.499894°N 8.729957°E
9807	Swiss Reformed Church of St. Arbogast	Swiss Reformed Church of St. Arbogast	Obere Hohlgasse	699.228	262.593	47.506593°N 8.75578°E
7764	Swiss Reformed City Church	Swiss Reformed City Church	Kirchplatz 1	697.201	261.714	47.498991°N 8.728687°E
8459	Hahnloser Collection in the Villa Flora	Hahnloser Collection in the Villa Flora	Tösstalstrasse 42/44	697.698	261.444	47.496489°N 8.735223°E
7766	Hegi Castle	Hegi Castle	Hegifeldstrasse 125	700.401	262.796	47.50824°N 8.771393°E
7841	Wülflingen Castle with Laundry House and Barn	Wülflingen Castle with Laundry House and Barn	Wülflingerstrasse 214	694.965	263.038	47.511224°N 8.699298°E
8460	Bommer Collection of Toy Trains	Bommer Collection of Toy Trains	Technoramastrasse 1	699.869	263.397	47.513726°N 8.764467°E
7768; 9172	City House and City Archives of Winterthur	City House and City Archives of Winterthur	Stadthausstrasse 4 A	697.400	261.943	47.501021°N 8.731378°E
7769; 8472	Oskar Reinhart Foundation (Former Boys' School House) and Oskar Reinhart Museum Am Stadtgarten	Oskar Reinhart Foundation (Former Boys' School House) and Oskar Reinhart Museum Am Stadtgarten	Stadthausstrasse 6	697.222	261.882	47.500499°N 8.729002°E
8810	Sulzer AG, Historical Corporate Archives	Sulzer AG, Historical Corporate Archives	Zürcherstrasse 12	696.475	261.713	47.499089°N 8.719053°E
7819	Geiselweid Tennis Complex	Geiselweid Tennis Complex	Pflanzschulstrasse 36	698.085	261.710	47.498824°N 8.740417°E
8458		Kellenberger Watch Collection	Kirchplatz 14	697.259	261.742	47.499234°N 8.729463°E
11757	Corporate Archives of AXA-Winterthur Versicherungen AG	Corporate Archives of AXA-Winterthur Versicherungen AG	Römerstrasse 17	697.747	261.947	47.501005°N 8.735983°E
7770; 8471	Villa Am Römerholz (former Villa Henri Sulzer-Ziegler) and Oskar Reinhart Collection Am Römerholz	Villa Am Römerholz (former Villa Henri Sulzer-Ziegler) and Oskar Reinhart Collection Am Römerholz	Haldenstrasse 95	697.406	263.082	47.511263°N 8.731706°E
7771; 8473	Villa Bühler-Egg and Coin and Antique Collection	Villa Bühler-Egg and Coin and Antique Collection	Lindstrasse 8	697.368	262.166	47.503031°N 8.731002°E
9722	Vitudurum / Oberwinterthur, Roman era Vicus	Vitudurum / Oberwinterthur, Roman era Vicus		699.230	262.170	47.502789°N 8.755713°E
7774	Wespi-Mühle	Wespi-Mühle	Wieshofstrasse 105	693.840	262.382	47.505486°N 8.684228°E
9318	Winterthur Library	Winterthur Library	Obere Kirchgasse 6	697.253	261.678	47.498659°N 8.729369°E
Unknown		ISOS Stadt: Winterthur				
Unknown		ISOS Weiler: Grundhof / Mörsburg				

== Zürich ==
KGS No.^{?}	Picture	Name	Street Address	CH1903 X coordinate	CH1903 Y coordinate	Location
7882	Old Cantonal School	Old Cantonal School	Rämistrasse 59	683.953	247.395	47.372042°N 8.550194°E
7915	Old Botanical Garden with Palmen House	Old Botanical Garden with Palmen House	Pelikanstrasse 40	682.759	247.244	47.370835°N 8.534359°E
9723	Old City Celtic / Roman era settlement / Medieval City	Old City; Celtic / Roman era settlement / Medieval City		683.250	247.500	47.373075°N 8.540907°E
11769	Administration Building I–IV including Sternwarte Urania	Administration Building I–IV including Sternwarte Urania	Bahnhofquai 3–5 / Lindenhofstrasse	683.283	247.731	47.375149°N 8.541386°E
10445	Arboretum	Arboretum	General-Guisan-Quai	682.908	246.386	47.3631°N 8.536173°E
8773	Archive of the History of ETH Zurich	Archive of the History of ETH Zurich	Hirschengraben 62	683.628	247.744	47.375222°N 8.545956°E
9169	Archive of Swiss Television	Archive of Swiss Television	Fernsehstrasse 1	684.750	252.340	47.416412°N 8.561681°E
7896	Enge Railway Station	Enge Railway Station	Tessinerplatz 10, 12	682.512	246.528	47.364427°N 8.530957°E
7897	Stadelhofen Railway Station with Platforms	Stadelhofen Railway Station with Platforms	Stadelhoferstrasse 8	683.829	246.785	47.366572°N 8.548438°E
9523	Belvoirpark	Belvoirpark	Seestrasse 125	682.702	245.783	47.357703°N 8.533335°E
9319	Library of the Israelitische Cultusgemeinde Zürich (ICZ)	Library of the Israelitische Cultusgemeinde Zürich (ICZ)		682.630	246.380	47.363081°N 8.532492°E
8578	Botanical Garden of the University of Zurich	Botanical Garden of the University of Zurich	Zollikerstrasse 107	684.722	245.944	47.358894°N 8.5601°E
7872	Crédit Suisse Headquarters	Crédit Suisse Headquarters	Paradeplatz 8	683.065	247.142	47.369879°N 8.538391°E
8036	Doldertal Houses	Doldertal Houses	Doldertal 17, 19	685.050	247.525	47.37307°N 8.564741°E
9291	Former Factory Escher-Wyss	Former Factory Escher-Wyss		681.591	249.214	47.388698°N 8.519256°E
9806	Former Girls' School am Grossmünster	Former Girls' School am Grossmünster	Grossmünsterplatz 6	683.510	247.185	47.37021°N 8.54429°E
7860; 8555	Former Psychology Building of the University of Zürich and the Medical History Museum of the University of Zurich	Former Psychology Building of the University of Zürich and the Medical History Museum of the University of Zurich	Rämistrasse 69	683.899	247.610	47.373982°N 8.549519°E
7850; 8798; 8615; 8950; 8563; 9353	ETH Zurich Main Building and Library	ETH Zurich Main Building and Library	Rämistrasse 101	683.786	247.882	47.376443°N 8.548074°E
9170	Fédération Internationale de Football Association (FIFA)	Fédération Internationale de Football Association (FIFA)	Documentation Centre, Adolf-Jöhr-Weg 20	685.825	248.485	47.381604°N 8.575185°E
9519; 8538	District Heating Plant, Machinery Laboratory and Geological / Mineralogical Exhibition of ETH Zurich	District Heating Plant, Machinery Laboratory and Geological / Mineralogical Exhibition of ETH Zurich	Sonneggstrasse 5	683.750	248.043	47.377896°N 8.547627°E
9262	Frauenbad Stadthausquai	Frauenbad Stadthausquai	Stadthausquai 12	683.350	246.989	47.368467°N 8.542135°E
9003	Allenmoos Open Air Swimming Pool	Allenmoos Open Air Swimming Pool	Ringstrasse 79	683.060	251.100	47.405476°N 8.539059°E
9004	Letzigraben Open Air Swimming Pool	Letzigraben Open Air Swimming Pool	Edelweissstrasse 5	680.250	248.245	47.380148°N 8.501323°E
9520	Freigut	Freigut	Brandschenkestrasse 48	682.435	246.965	47.368366°N 8.530018°E
7923	Zürich Sihlfeld Cemetery	Zürich Sihlfeld Cemetery	Aemtlerstrasse 149, 151	680.964	247.756	47.375663°N 8.510689°E
10381	Geschäftshaus Metropol	Geschäftshaus Metropol	Stadthausquai 11	683.297	246.961	47.368222°N 8.541429°E
7926	Geschäftshaus zur Trülle	Geschäftshaus zur Trülle	Bahnhofstrasse 69	683.038	247.608	47.374074°N 8.53812°E
7928	Gesellschaftshaus zum Rüden	Gesellschaftshaus zum Rüden	Limmatquai 42	683.419	247.259	47.370887°N 8.543099°E
10444	Gustav Ammann-Park	Gustav Ammann-Park	Langwiesstrasse	682.689	251.726	47.411152°N 8.53426°E
7852	Hauptbahnhof (Main Railway Station)	Hauptbahnhof (Main Railway Station)	Bahnhofplatz 15 / Museumsstrasse 1	683.190	247.980	47.3774°N 8.540201°E
9026	Main Building of the University of Zurich	Main Building of the University of Zurich	Rämistrasse 71	683.856	247.679	47.374608°N 8.548963°E
9381	Haus Konstruktiv (im EWZ-Unterwerk Selnau)	Haus Konstruktiv (im EWZ-Unterwerk Selnau)	Selnaustrasse 25	682.588	247.417	47.372412°N 8.532127°E
7942	House zum Kiel / zum Lindentor	House zum Kiel / zum Lindentor	Hirschengraben 20	683.730	247.245	47.370721°N 8.547213°E
7853	House zum Rechberg	House zum Rechberg	Hirschengraben 40 /	683.765	247.490	47.37292°N 8.547723°E
7950; 8778; 9351	House zum Sonnenhof and Swiss Social Archive	House zum Sonnenhof and Swiss Social Archive	Stadelhofstrasse 12	683.760	246.810	47.366805°N 8.547529°E
7854; 8892; 8949	House zum Unteren Rech, Construction Archives of Zürich (BAZ) and City Archives	House zum Unteren Rech, Construction Archives of Zürich (BAZ) and City Archives	Neumarkt 4	683.618	247.425	47.372354°N 8.545764°E
7868	Helmhaus and Wasserkirche	Helmhaus and Wasserkirche	Limmatquai 31	683.424	247.142	47.369834°N 8.543143°E
7857; 8483	Hochschule für Gestaltung und Kunst and Museum	Hochschule für Gestaltung und Kunst and Museum	Ausstellungsstrasse 60	682.850	248.592	47.382947°N 8.535813°E
Unknown		Institut für Geschichte and Theorie of the Architektur	ETH Hönggerberg	680.660	251.425	47.408697°N 8.507325°E
7963	Cantonal School of Freudenberg und Enge	Cantonal School of Freudenberg und Enge	Gutenbergstrasse 15	682.334	246.607	47.365159°N 8.528616°E
10025	Catholic Church of Felix and Regula	Catholic Church of Felix and Regula	Hardstrasse 76	681.155	248.345	47.380936°N 8.513324°E
7958	Catholic Church of St. Antonius	Catholic Church of St. Antonius	Neptunstrasse 68	684.492	246.672	47.365471°N 8.557193°E
10386	Kindergarten Wiedikon	Kindergarten Wiedikon	Zentralstrasse 105	681.403	247.573	47.373963°N 8.516468°E
7965	Kongresshaus and Tonhalle	Kongresshaus and Tonhalle	Gotthardstrasse 5	683.025	246.685	47.365774°N 8.537777°E
10054	Crematorium at Zürich Sihlfeld	Crematorium at Zürich Sihlfeld	Albisriederstrasse 51	680.482	247.773	47.375875°N 8.50431°E
7858; 8477	Art Museum	Art Museum	Heimplatz 1	683.821	247.181	47.370134°N 8.548406°E
10446	Lindenhof	Lindenhof	Pfalzgasse	683.250	247.480	47.372896°N 8.540903°E
8951	Medical History Archive of the Medical History Institute	Medical History Archive of the Medical History Institute	Hirschengraben 82	683.607	247.853	47.376205°N 8.545699°E
8806		Migros-Cooperative Association, Documentation, Information and Audiovisual Archive	Limmatstrasse 152	682.505	248.864	47.385436°N 8.531295°E
9382		Migros Museum Modern Art	Limmatstrasse 270	682.045	249.280	47.389235°N 8.52528°E
7971	Militäranlage (Waffenplatz)	Militäranlage (Waffenplatz)	Kasernenstrasse 49	682.625	247.765	47.375537°N 8.532681°E
8591	Moulagen Museum	Moulagen Museum	Haldenbachstrasse 14	683.820	248.325	47.380423°N 8.548607°E
7972	Münsterbrücke (Bridge)	Münsterbrücke (Bridge)		683.374	247.154	47.369948°N 8.542484°E
7861	Muraltengut	Muraltengut	Seestrasse 201, 203	682.645	245.316	47.35351°N 8.532494°E
8590	Museum Bellerive	Museum Bellerive	Höschgasse 3	683.950	245.660	47.356439°N 8.549829°E
8899	Neue Zürcher Zeitung, Archives	Neue Zürcher Zeitung, Archives	Falkenstrasse 11	683.755	246.615	47.365052°N 8.547427°E
7862	Opera House	Opera House	Falkenstrasse 1	683.705	246.605	47.364969°N 8.546763°E
8485; 8487	Paleontological Museum, Zoological Museum and Anthropologicsal Museum of the University of Zurich	Paleontological Museum, Zoological Museum and Anthropologicsal Museum of the University of Zurich	Karl-Schmid-Strasse 4	683.782	247.747	47.375229°N 8.547996°E
10053	Pavillon Le Corbusier	Pavillon Le Corbusier	Höschgasse 8	684.031	245.624	47.356105°N 8.550894°E
7980	Peterhof / Leuenhof	Peterhof / Leuenhof	Bahnhofstrasse 30, 32	683.137	247.213	47.370509°N 8.539357°E
9524	Platzspitz	Platzspitz	Platzpromenade 5	683.170	248.315	47.380415°N 8.539999°E
7867	Prediger Church	Prediger Church	Predigerplatz 1	683.603	247.589	47.373831°N 8.545596°E
7869	Paddle steamer Stadt Rapperswil	Paddle steamer Stadt Rapperswil		683.100	246.500	47.364101°N 8.538735°E
7870	Paddle steamer Stadt Zürich	Paddle steamer Stadt Zürich		683.150	246.550	47.364544°N 8.539406°E
7871	Zürich Town Hall	Zürich Town Hall	Limmatquai 55	683.381	247.335	47.371575°N 8.54261°E
7987	Swiss Reformed Church at Enge	Swiss Reformed Church at Enge	Bürglistrasse 15	682.416	246.315	47.362523°N 8.529647°E
7865	Swiss Reformed Church at Neumünster	Swiss Reformed Church at Neumünster	Neumünsterstrasse 10	684.585	246.131	47.360594°N 8.558322°E
7866	Swiss Reformed Church of St. Peter	Swiss Reformed Church of St. Peter	St. Peterhofstatt 1	683.227	247.291	47.371199°N 8.540563°E
7990	Swiss Reformed Holy Cross Church	Swiss Reformed Holy Cross Church	Dolderstrasse 63	684.850	247.230	47.370443°N 8.562037°E
7863	Swiss Reformed Fraumünster	Swiss Reformed Fraumünster	Münsterhof 2	683.266	247.137	47.369809°N 8.541051°E
7864	Swiss Reformed Grossmünster	Swiss Reformed Grossmünster	Grossmünsterplatz 6	683.510	247.185	47.37021°N 8.54429°E
8814	Ringier AG, Corporate Archives	Ringier AG, Corporate Archives	Dufourstrasse 23	683.794	246.489	47.363914°N 8.547919°E
9137	Rotach Houses	Rotach Houses	Wasserwerkstrasse 27–31	683.060	248.715	47.384026°N 8.538617°E
7992	Rotes Schloss	Rotes Schloss	Beethovenstrasse 1–7	682.990	246.595	47.364969°N 8.537297°E
7849	Schlachthofanlage	Schlachthofanlage	Herdernstrasse 59–63	680.645	248.770	47.384821°N 8.506648°E
7995	Hirschengraben School House	Hirschengraben School House	Hirschengraben 46	683.740	247.575	47.373688°N 8.547408°E
9181	Schweizer Radio DRS	Schweizer Radio DRS	D+A, Brunnenhofstrasse 22	682.795	250.650	47.401462°N 8.535466°E
8865	Schweizerische Gemeinnützige Gesellschaft (SGG)	Schweizerische Gemeinnützige Gesellschaft (SGG)	Schaffhauserstrasse 7	683.080	249.205	47.388431°N 8.538972°E
7873; 8486	Swiss National Museum	Swiss National Museum	Museumstrasse 2	683.247	248.172	47.379119°N 8.540992°E
7996	Swiss National Bank	Swiss National Bank	Börsenstrasse 15, 17	683.253	246.919	47.36785°N 8.540838°E
8793	Staatsarchiv des Kantons Zürich	Staatsarchiv des Kantons Zürich	Winterthurerstrasse 170	683.680	250.200	47.397303°N 8.547104°E
8534	Sukkulenten-Sammlung Zürich	Sukkulenten-Sammlung Zürich	Mythenquai 88	682.824	245.603	47.356069°N 8.534916°E
8001	City House	City House	Stadthausquai 17	683.270	247.080	47.369296°N 8.541093°E
7918	Sternwarte of the ETH Zurich	Sternwarte of the ETH Zurich	Schmelzbergstrasse 25	683.966	248.058	47.378003°N 8.55049°E
7874	Foundation E.G. Bührle Collection	Foundation E.G. Bührle Collection	Zollikerstrasse 172	684.855	245.295	47.35304°N 8.561737°E
8843	Swiss Re, Swiss Reinsurance Company, Corporate Archives	Swiss Re, Swiss Reinsurance Company, Corporate Archives	Mythenquai 50	682.816	246.018	47.359802°N 8.534887°E
8952	Thomas Mann Archive of ETH Zürich	Thomas Mann Archive of ETH Zürich	Schönberggasse 15	683.855	247.600	47.373898°N 8.548935°E
8008	Tram Depot at Burgwies (Zürich Tram Museum)	Tram Depot at Burgwies (Zürich Tram Museum)	Forchstrasse 260	685.589	245.815	47.357622°N 8.57155°E
11735		Üetliberg, Prehistoric and Roman era Settlement		679.500	244.900	47.350155°N 8.490799°E
7848	University of Zürich (former Eye Clinik)	University of Zürich (former Eye Clinik)	Rämistrasse 73	683.852	247.761	47.375346°N 8.548925°E
9724	Unteres Zürichseebecken Prehistoric pile dwelling settlements Alpenquai, Grosser and Kleiner Hafner	Unteres Zürichseebecken; Prehistoric pile dwelling settlements Alpenquai, Grosser and Kleiner Hafner	prähistorische Seeufersiedlungen	683.375	246.682	47.365703°N 8.542409°E
8011	Villa Bleuler with Park	Villa Bleuler with Park	Zollikerstrasse 32	684.345	246.310	47.362234°N 8.555179°E
8013	Villa Egli	Villa Egli	Höschgasse 4	683.980	245.610	47.355985°N 8.550217°E
8015	Villa Patumbah with Outbuildings and Park	Villa Patumbah with Outbuildings and Park		684.690	245.722	47.356902°N 8.559634°E
7875	Villa Rieter (Schönberg)	Villa Rieter (Schönberg)	Gablerstrasse 14	682.465	245.985	47.359549°N 8.530235°E
Unknown	Villa Tobler	Villa Tobler	Winkelwiese 4	683.688	247.179	47.370133°N 8.546645°E
8020	Villa Wegmann	Villa Wegmann	Hohenbühlstrasse 15	683.995	246.770	47.366416°N 8.550633°E
7876; 8484	Villa Wesendonck with Rietberg Museum	Villa Wesendonck with Rietberg Museum	Gablerstrasse 15	682.470	245.920	47.358964°N 8.530289°E
8023		Villa zum Schönbühl	Kreuzbühlstrasse 36	684.135	246.640	47.365229°N 8.552461°E
8539	Ethnology Museum of the University of Zürich	Ethnology Museum of the University of Zürich	Pelikanstrasse 40	682.759	247.244	47.370835°N 8.534359°E
8025	Warenhaus Jelmoli	Warenhaus Jelmoli	Seidengasse 1	682.996	247.622	47.374205°N 8.537566°E
8027	Wehrlimühle	Wehrlimühle	Seefeldstrasse 219	684.780	245.166	47.35189°N 8.56072°E
8028	Weisses Schloss	Weisses Schloss	General-Guisan-Quai 34	682.860	246.495	47.364086°N 8.535557°E
9101	House zum Brunnenhof with Jewish murals	House zum Brunnenhof with Jewish murals	Brunngasse 8	683.525	247.505	47.373086°N 8.544548°E
8041	Wollishofen	Wollishofen	Wohnkolonie Neubühl, Ostbühlstrasse 33–79	682.960	243.004	47.332677°N 8.536235°E
9352; 8608	Central Library of Zürich including Handwritten Manuscript Section	Central Library of Zürich including Handwritten Manuscript Section	Zähringerplatz 6	683.556	247.616	47.37408°N 8.544979°E
9551		Central Library of Zürich including Music Section (Musikabteilung)	Predigerplatz 1	683.603	247.589	47.373831°N 8.545596°E
7878	Guild House zur Meise	Guild House zur Meise	Münsterhof 20	683.315	247.170	47.370099°N 8.541706°E
7879	Zunfthaus zur Zimmerleuten	Zunfthaus zur Zimmerleuten	Limmatquai 40	683.438	247.232	47.370641°N 8.543345°E
8808	Zürcher Kantonalbank, Historical Archive	Zürcher Kantonalbank, Historical Archive	Bahnhofstrasse 9	683.148	246.940	47.368052°N 8.539452°E
10441	Zürichhorn	Zürichhorn	Seefeldquai	684.803	244.899	47.349486°N 8.560974°E
8842	«Zürich» Versicherungsgesellschaft	«Zürich» Versicherungsgesellschaft	Mythenquai 2	682.820	246.279	47.362149°N 8.534988°E
