= Baer House =

Baer House may refer to:

== In Switzerland ==
- Baer House (Zurich), a property of national-level cultural significance in Zurich

== In the US ==
- Baer House (Little Rock, Arkansas), listed on the National Register of Historic Places (NRHP)
- Eder-Baer House, Chaska, Minnesota, NRHP-listed in Carver County
- Albert R. Baer House, Menomonee Falls, Wisconsin, NRHP-listed in Waukesha County
