= Greifenberg Castle =

Castle ruin in Zurich, Switzerland

Coordinates: 47°20′46″N 8°51′52″E

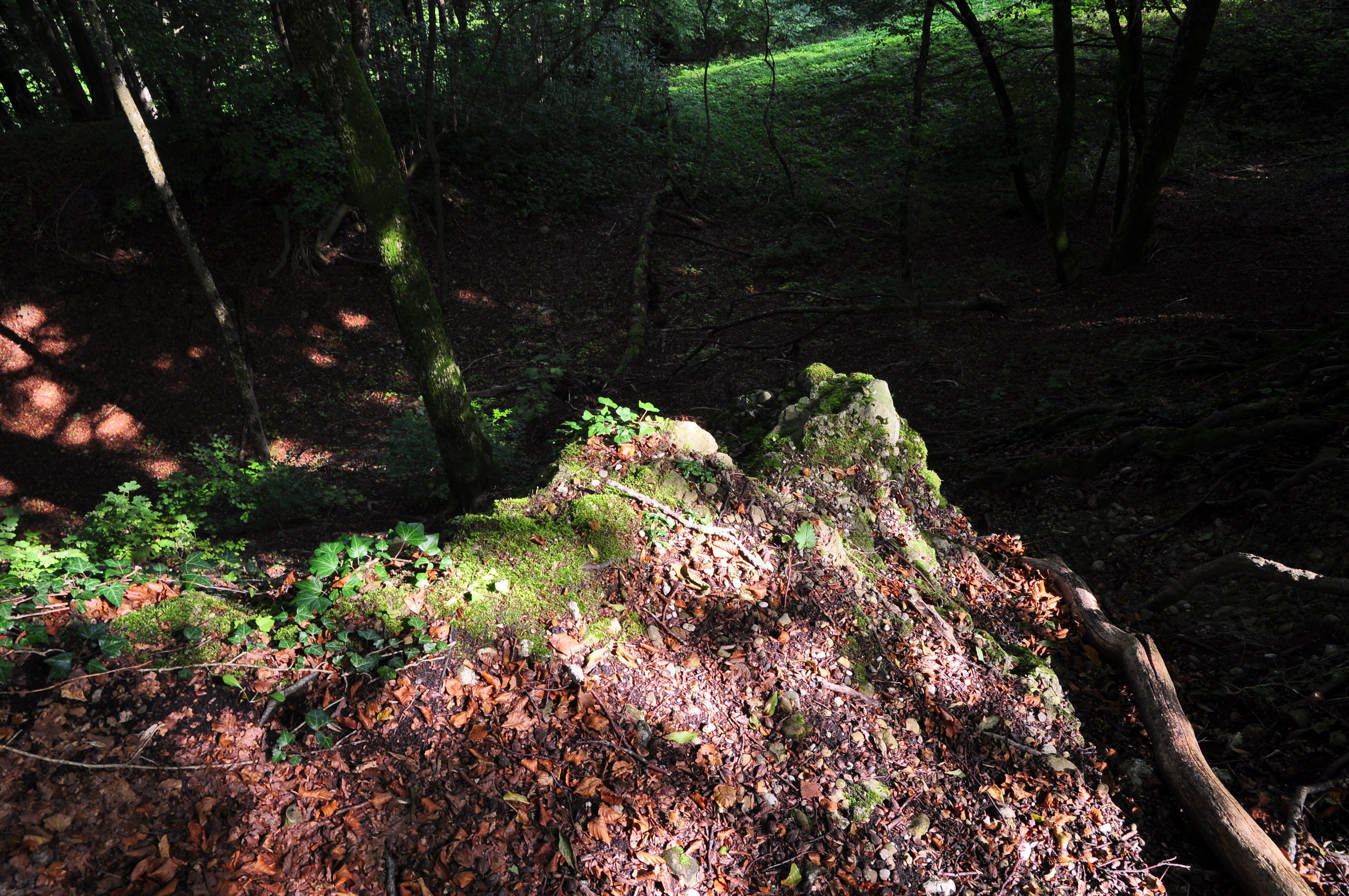
The site of Greifenberg Castle

Greifenberg Castle is a ruined castle in the municipality of Bäretswil and the canton of Zürich in Switzerland. It is a Swiss heritage site of national significance.

== See also ==
- List of castles in Switzerland
