= Glanzenberg Castle =

Castle ruin in Zurich, Switzerland

- Burg Fahr
- Unterengstringen
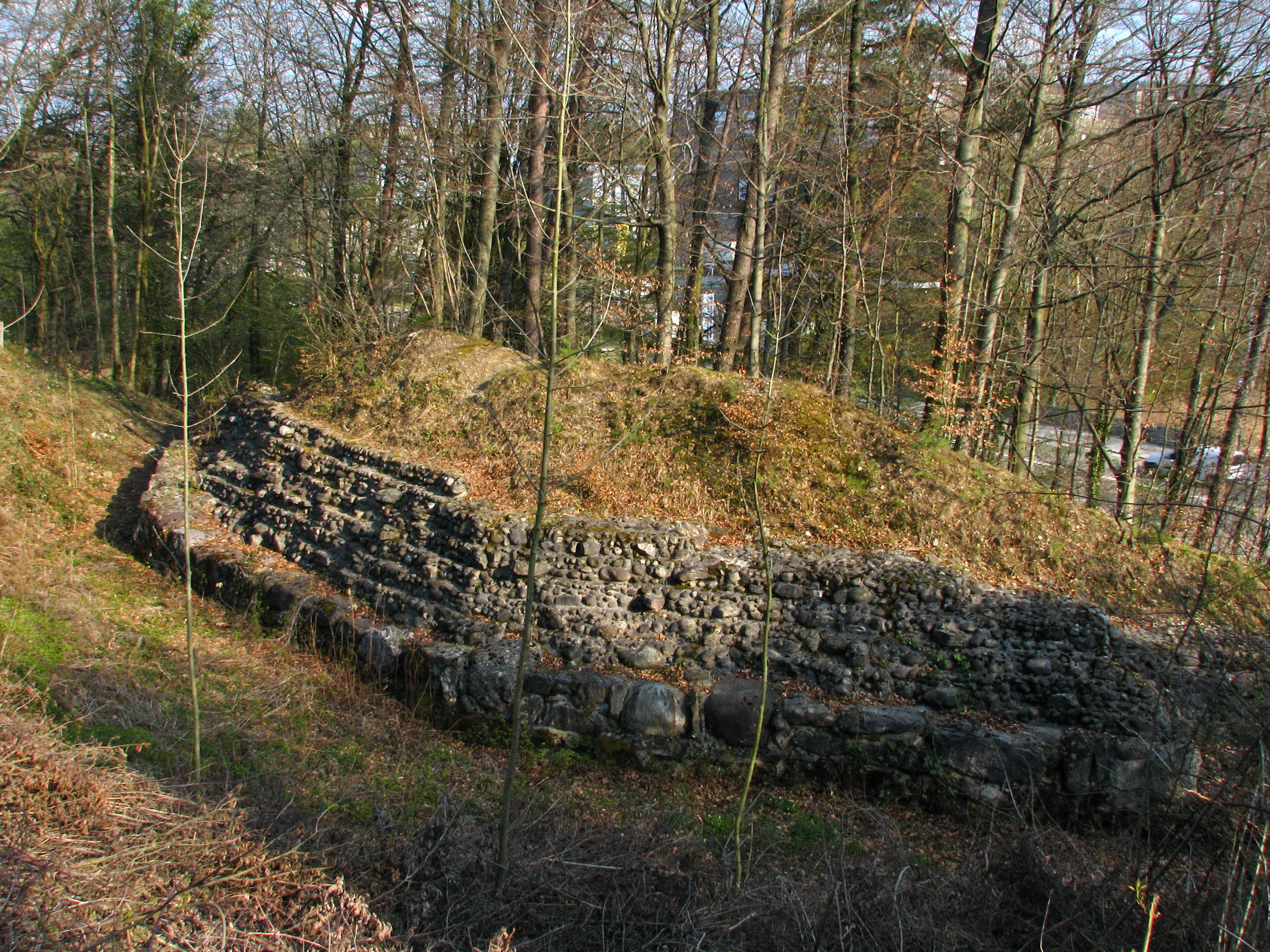
- Glanzenberg Castle in 2010

Site information
- Type: lowland castle
- Code: CH-ZH
- Condition: ruin

Location
- Coordinates: 47°24′08″N 8°25′20″E
- Area: 180 m × 45 m–110 m (591 ft × 148 ft–361 ft)
- Height: 399 m above the sea

Site history
- Built: about 1044 (Burg Fahr) about 1240 (Glanzenberg)

Garrison information
- Occupants: Freiadlige

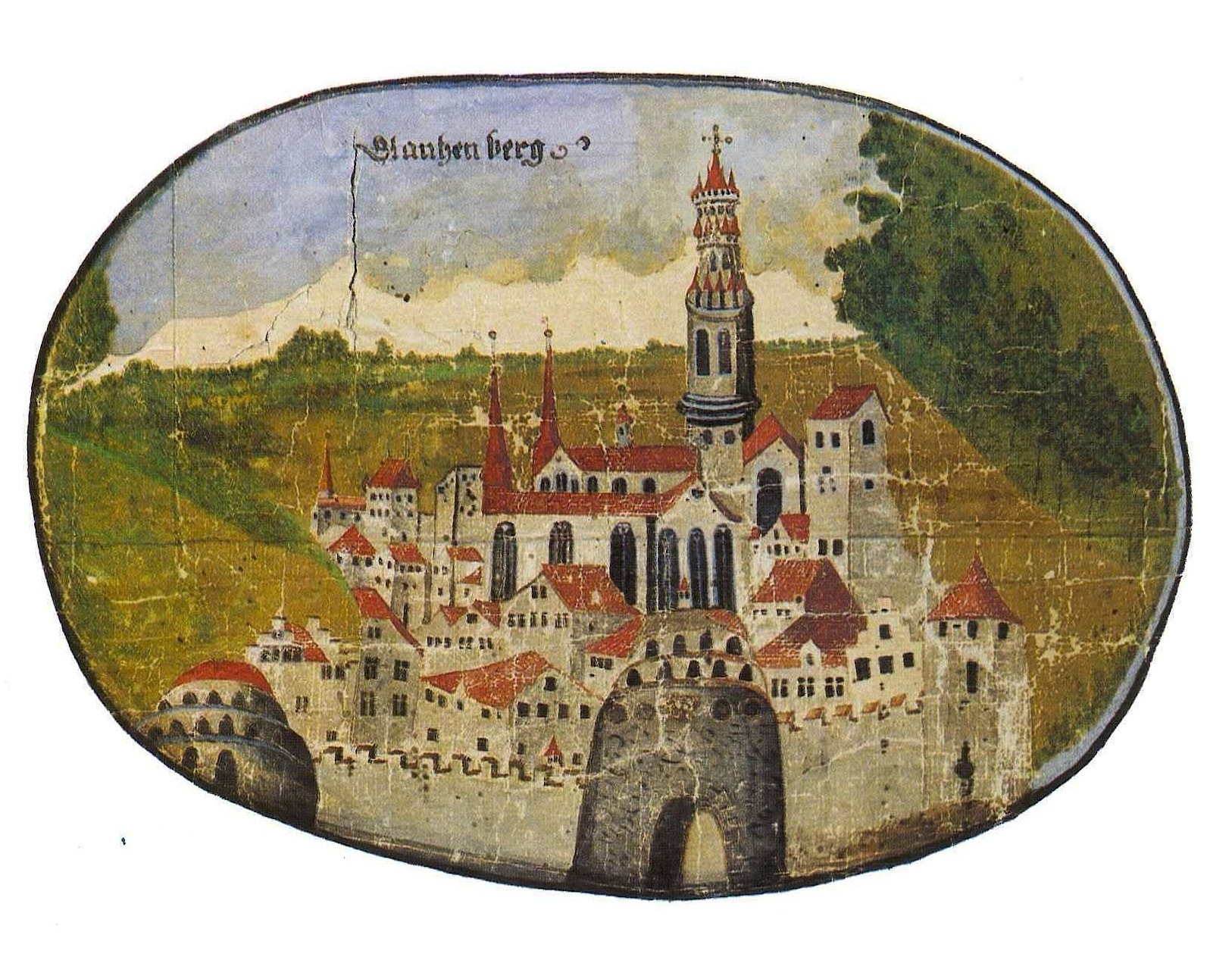
Glanzenberg Castle in 1727

Glanzenberg Castle (German: Burg Glanzenberg or Ruine Glanzenberg) is a ruined castle in the municipality of Unterengstringen in the Swiss canton of Zurich. It is a Swiss heritage site of national significance.

== See also ==
- List of castles in Switzerland
