= Hegi Castle =

Castle in Zurich, Switzerland

Coordinates: 47°30′30″N 8°46′17″E

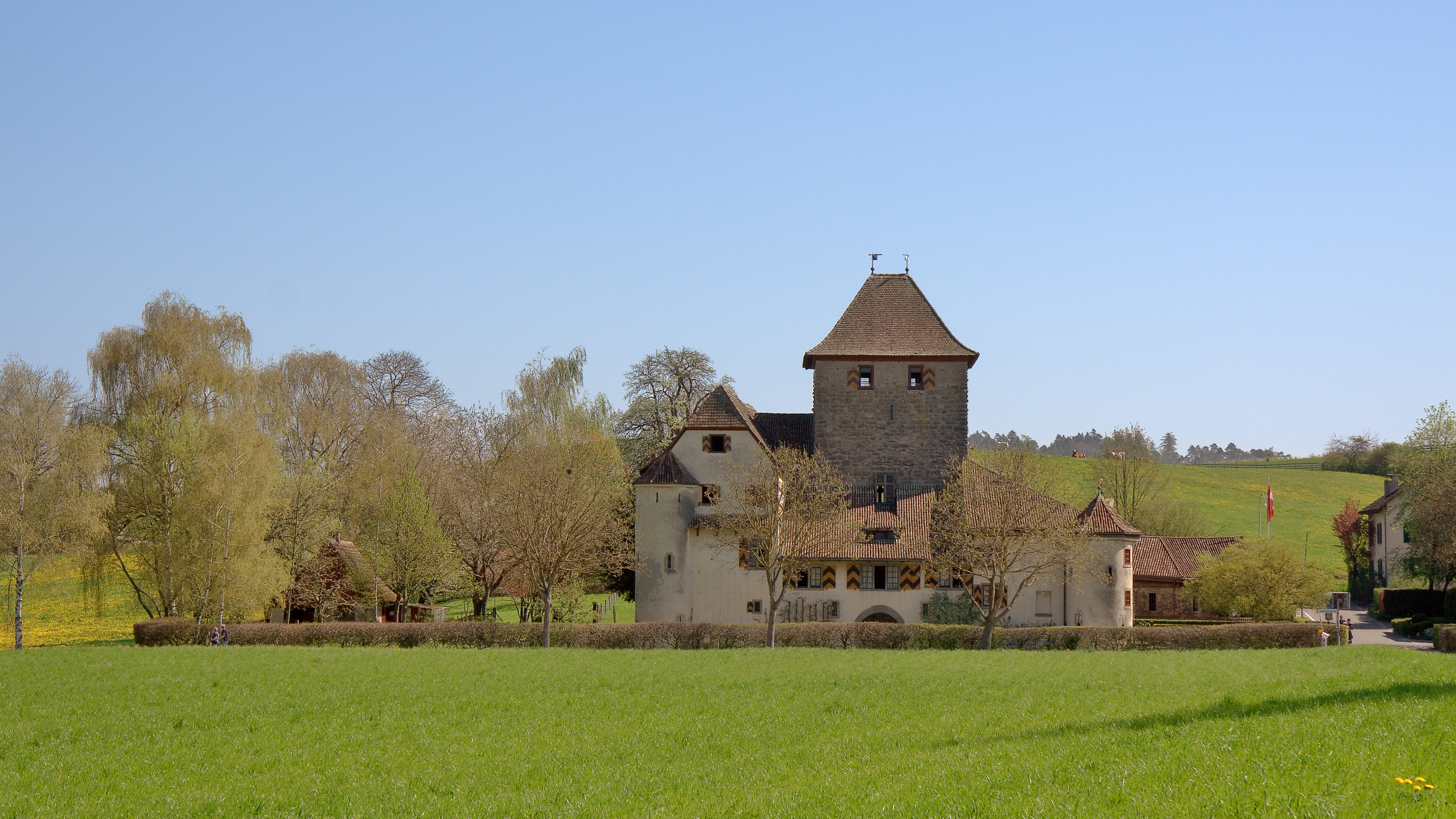
Hegi Castle

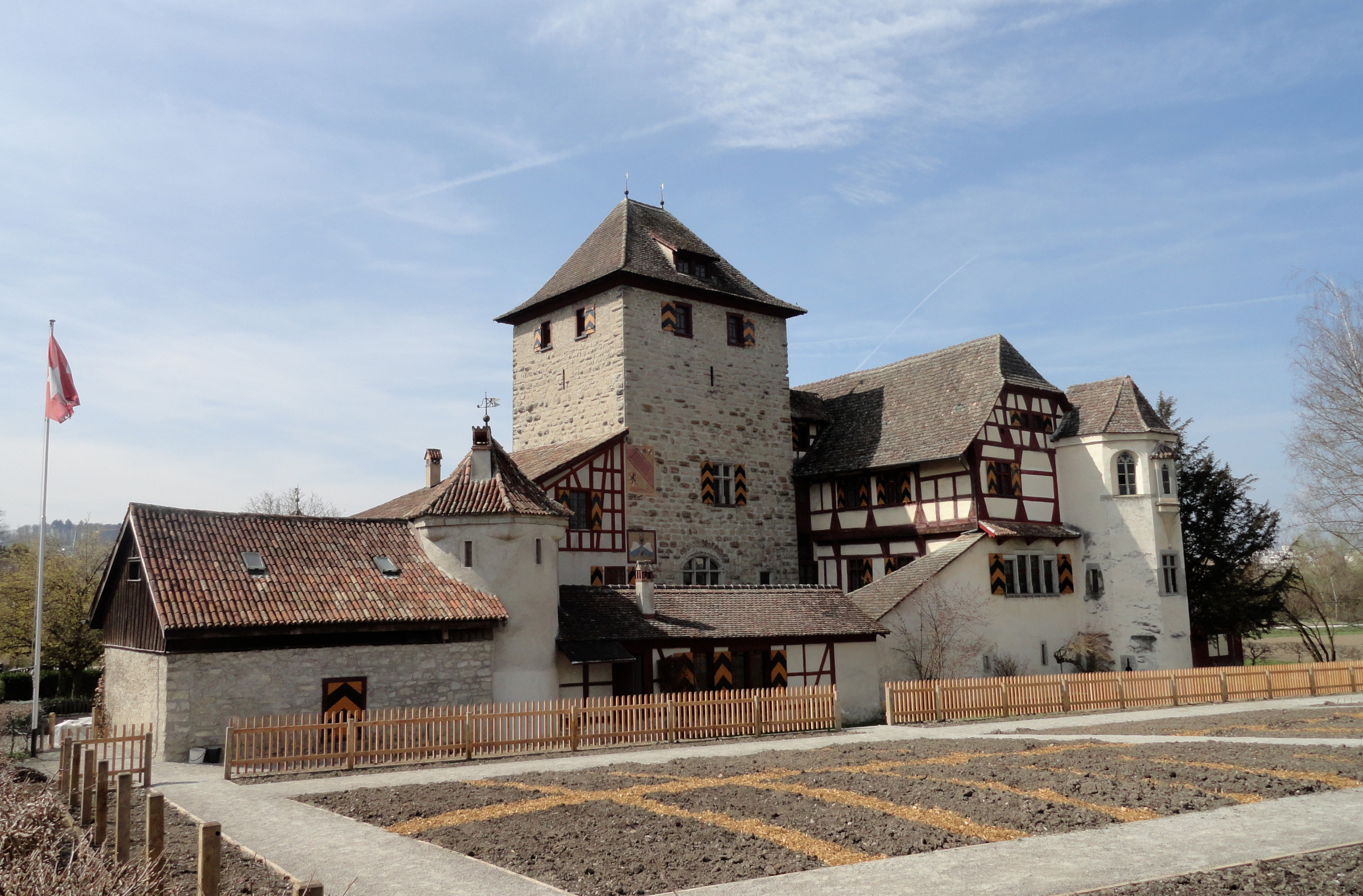
The east side of the castle

Hegi Castle (German: Schloss Hegi) is a medieval castle in Winterthur, in the canton of Zurich, Switzerland. Built around 1200 and first mentioned in 1225, it later passed to the Hohenlandenberg and Hallwyl families before coming under Zurich’s administration from 1587 to 1798. Restored in the early 20th century and owned by the city of Winterthur since 1947, it is now a museum and cultural venue, and a Swiss heritage site of national significance.

== History ==
The castle, first mentioned in 1225 in connection with the ministerials of Hegi, was probably built around 1200 to secure the property of the Bishopric of Constance. The core of the complex is a defensive residential tower with a surrounding moat. Under the Lords of Hohenlandenberg, who acquired the estate in 1460, the complex was expanded with a ring wall, round towers, a half-timber residential building with a chapel, and additional outbuildings.

In 1519 the estate passed by inheritance to the Hallwyl family, who managed and expanded it. In 1587 they attempted to sell it to the city of Winterthur, but Zurich took over the purchase and administered it until 1798 as an outer bailiwick (äussere Obervogtei) governed by members of the Zurich Grand Council. In the 19th century, the property was heavily altered under private ownership. It was purchased and restored in 1915–16 by history professor Friedrich Hegi-Naef, and in 1947 it was acquired by the city of Winterthur.

Today, Hegi Castle is listed as a Swiss heritage site of national significance.

== Tourism ==
The castle was first opened to visitors in 1947 and was used as a youth hostel until 2000. Today the castle houses a museum and also hosts cultural events. In 2012, a garden of traditional vegetable varieties was re-established on the eastern side, drawing on historic illustrations.

== See also ==
- History of Zürich
- List of castles in Switzerland
- Tourism in Switzerland
