= Botanical Garden of the University of Zurich =

Botanical garden in Zurich, Switzerland

Coordinates: 47.358566°N 8.560817°E

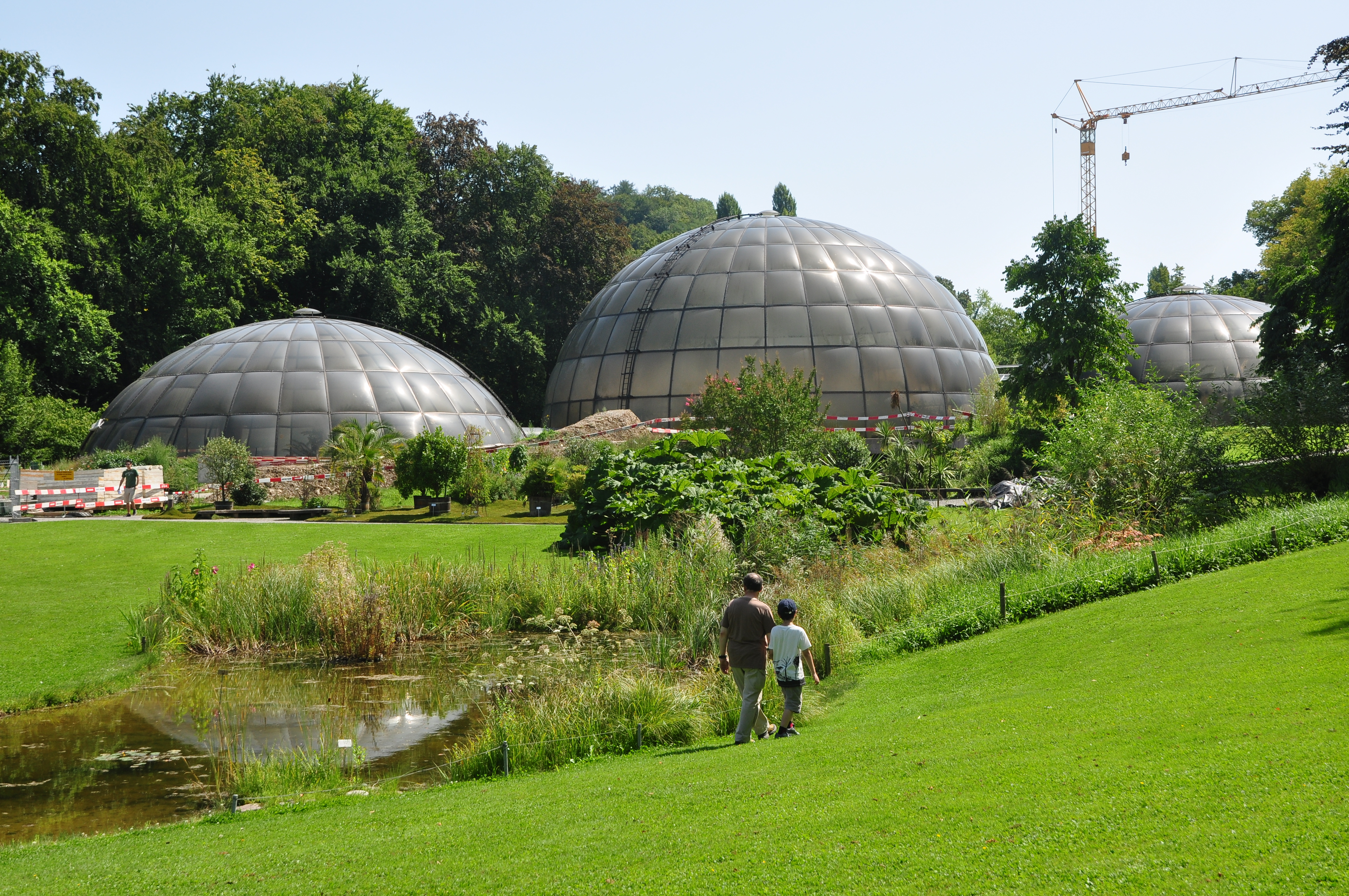
The Botanical Garden

The Botanical Garden of the University of Zurich (German: Botanischer Garten der Universität Zürich) is a botanical garden in the Swiss city of Zurich. It was opened in 1977 and is located at Zollikerstrasse in the Weinegg quarter of the city.

The garden should not be mistaken for the Old Botanical Garden, located on the former zur Katz bastion in the city centre, which is also owned by the University of Zurich.

== Greenhouses ==
The botanical garden also boasts three hemispherical greenhouses, each designed for a different climate: the largest is devoted to tropical plants, while the others are dedicated to subtropical and savannah plants. There are numerous species of palm trees, tree ferns, orchids and more, as well as three aquariums that recreate the atmosphere of rivers in Central Africa, South America and Southeast Asia.

== See also ==
- Natural History Museum of the University of Zurich
