= Rosenberg Estate =

Country estate in Zurich, Switzerland

Coordinates: 47°14′16″N 8°46′54″E

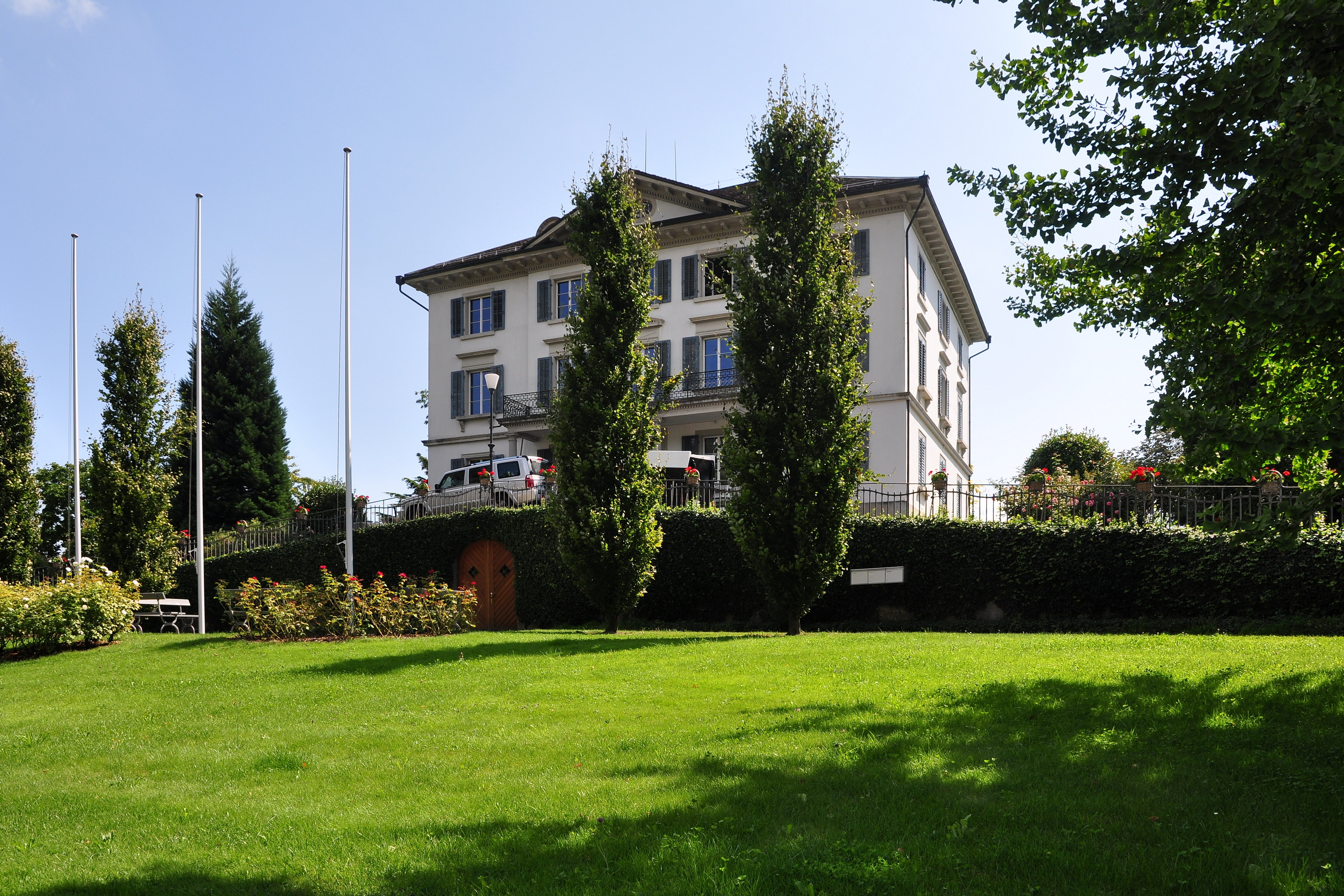
Rosenberg Estate

The Rosenberg Estate (German: Landsitz Rosenberg) is a country estate in the municipality of Hombrechtikon and the canton of Zurich in Switzerland. It is a Swiss heritage site of national significance.
