= Alt-Wülflingen Castle =

Castle in Zurich, Switzerland

Coordinates: 47°29′59″N 8°41′17″E

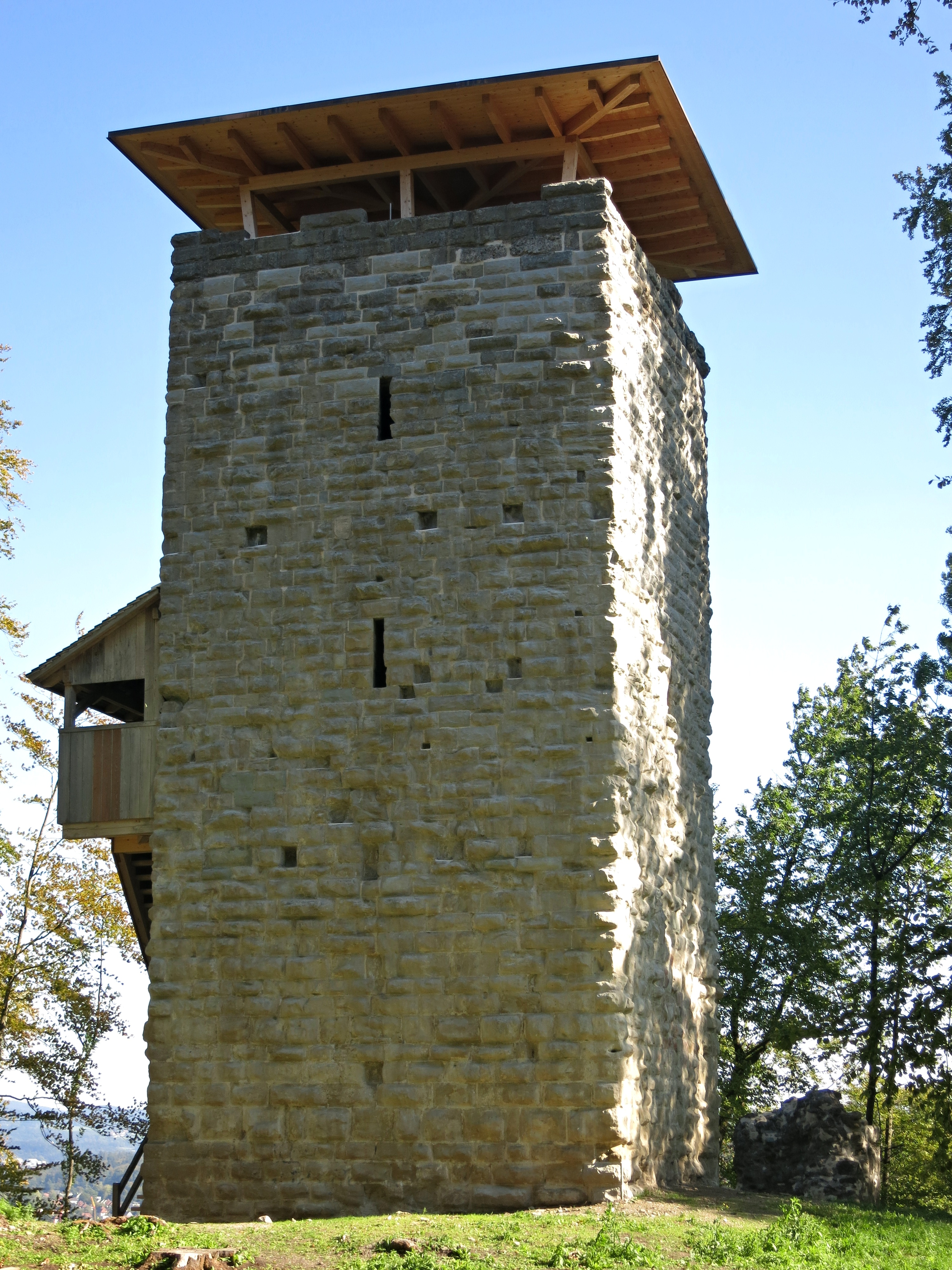
Alt-Wülflingen Castle

Alt-Wülflingen Castle (German: Burgruine Alt-Wülflingen) is a castle in the city of Winterthur of the canton of Zurich in Switzerland. It is a Swiss heritage site of national significance.

== See also ==
- List of castles in Switzerland
