= Spinnerei im Hard =

Former spinning mill in Switzerland

Coordinates: 47.517584°N 8.675854°E

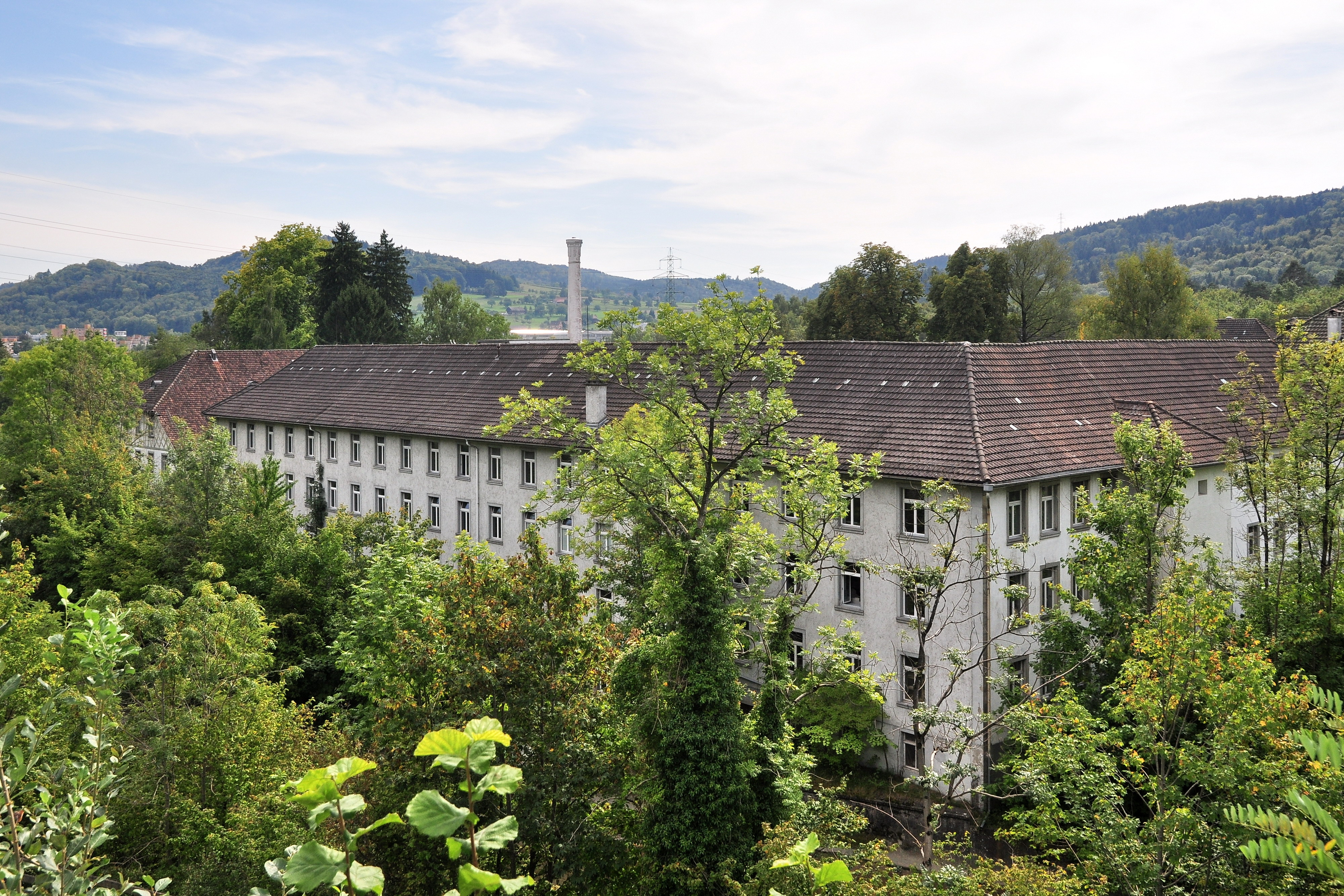
- The former mill in 2011
- Industry: Textiles
- Founded: 1800
- Founders: Members of the Sulzer, Ziegler and Haggenmacher families
- Defunct: 1924
- Headquarters: Wülflingen, Switzerland
- Number of employees: 205 (1855)

The Spinnerei im Hard ("Hard spinning mill") was a spinning mill in a bend of the Töss near Wülflingen. Founded by members of the Sulzer, Ziegler and Haggenmacher families of Winterthur and built in 1802, it was the first spinning mill in Switzerland to have both mechanical spinning machines and mechanical power. Operations ended in 1924. Since 1986 the complex has belonged to the Gemeinschaft Hard AG, which combines housing, work and culture.

== History ==
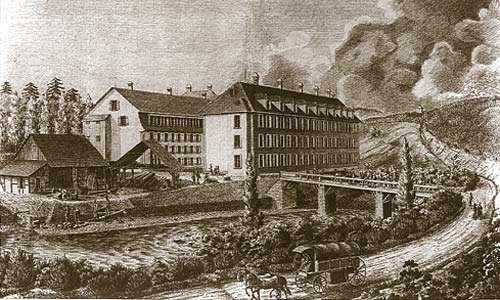
The mill seen from the east, sepia ink drawing, c. 1820. The first factory of 1802 stands behind the building of 1810–1811 on the right.

The Spinnerei im Hard was founded by seven members of the Sulzer, Ziegler and Haggenmacher families of Winterthur, among them Johann Heinrich Sulzer and Johann Heinrich Ziegler. After they had joined to form the Hardgesellschaft ("Hard Company") in 1800 and bought land in the bend of the Töss near Wülflingen in 1801, a large factory building, a house for the tenant farmer, a residence and a workers' house were built in 1802. The Continental System (1806–1813) brought a strong upturn, which allowed the plant to be enlarged in 1810–1811. The mill's own mechanical workshop contributed much to the company's success. From 1816 to 1827 a boarding school (Internat) was maintained for the children employed in the factory (about 200 in 1825).

A severe crisis in 1836–1839 forced the Hardgesellschaft to sell the mill to Karl Sebastian von Clais in 1841, under whom the business flourished again in the 1850s. In 1855, 205 people worked at the Hard. In 1865 the sons of von Clais sold the mill to the Honegger brothers of Wald. The sons of Julius Honegger closed it for good in 1924.

From 1924 to 1928 the complex belonged to the Knopffabrik Neftenbach (Neftenbach button factory), and then until 1985 to the plastics molding works H. Stüdli & Co. From 1935 to 1946 it housed the first Swiss vocational camp (Berufslager) for metalworkers, and from 1946 to 1962 the vocational school of the metal industry. Since 1986 it has belonged to the Gemeinschaft Hard AG, which is organized as a cooperative and combines living, working and culture. As of 2010 it provided housing for about 120 people and accommodated about 50 businesses.

== Bibliography ==
- E. Dejung, M. Ruoff, Spinnerei, Weberei und mechanische Werkstätte Hard bei Wülflingen 1800–1924, 1936
- S. Bärtschi-Baumann, Die Hard, 1994
- H.-P. Bärtschi et al., Industriekultur in Winterthur, 2002, 67–82
- S. Larcher, E. Bösch, Fabrikneue Arbeit: Haard Spinnerey 1801–1860, 2002
