= Elgg Castle =

Castle in Zurich, Switzerland

Coordinates: 47°29′00″N 8°51′57″E

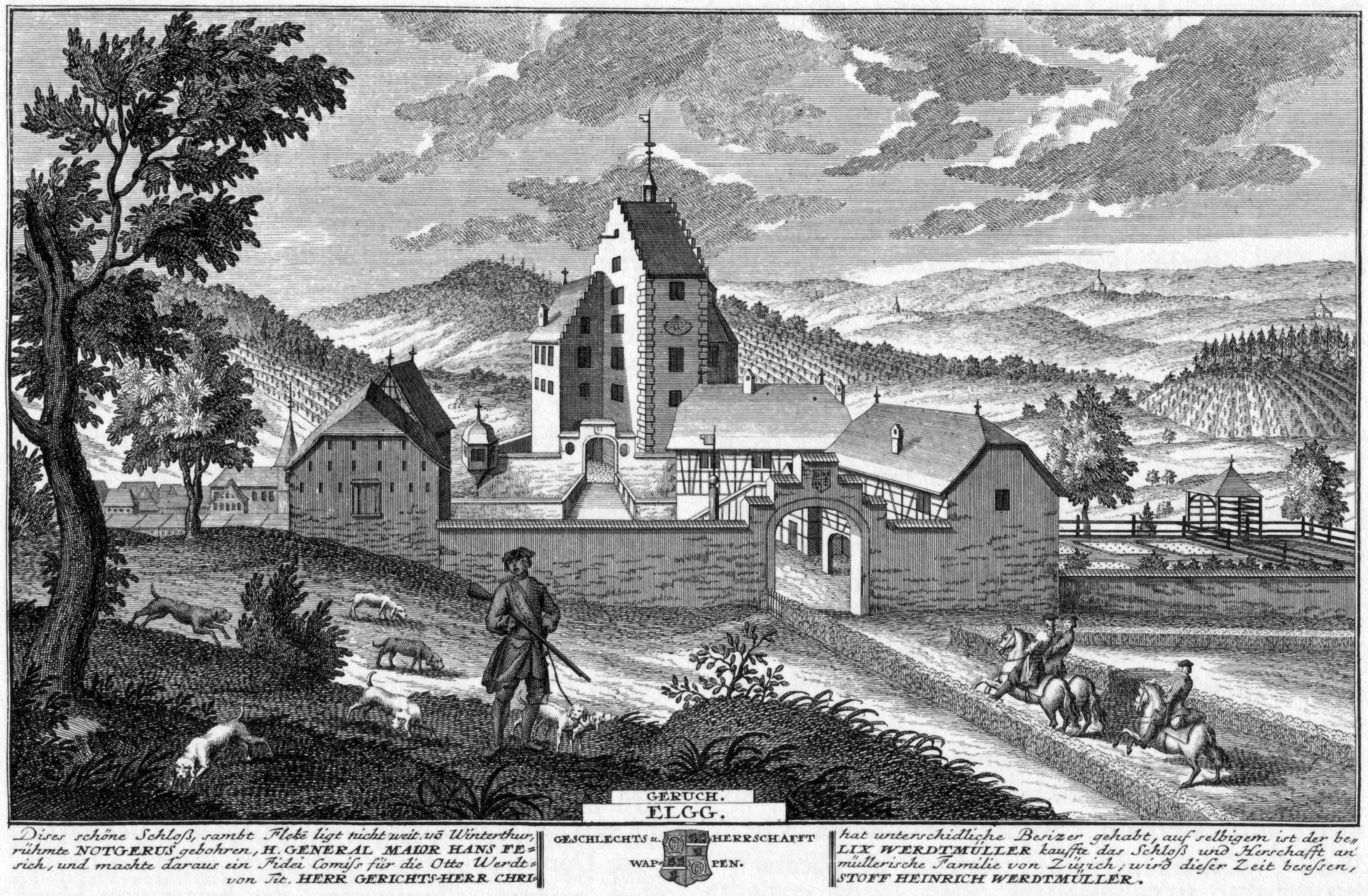
Elgg Castle in 1740

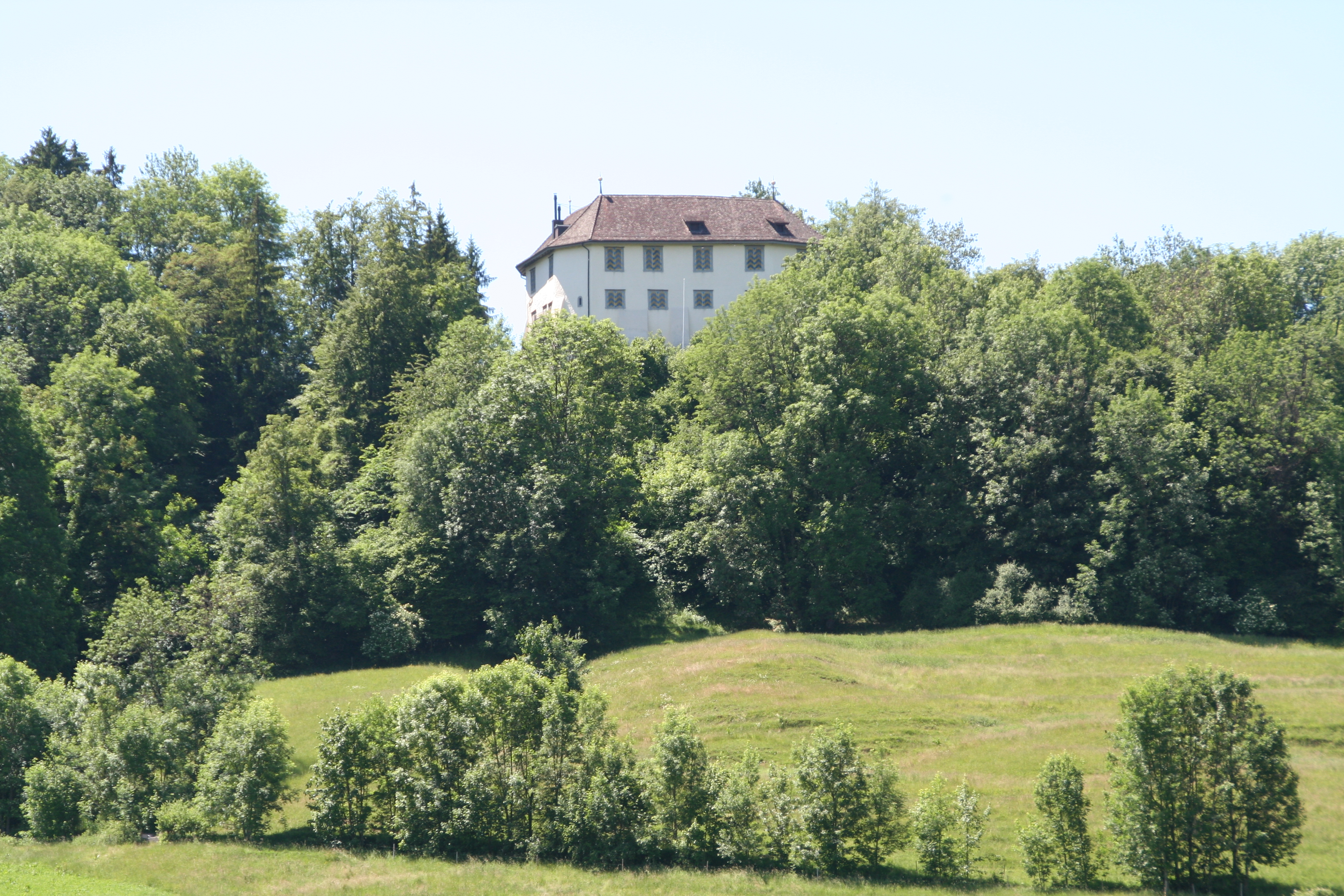
Elgg Castle in 2011

Elgg Castle (German: Schloss Elgg) is a castle in the municipality of Elgg in the Swiss canton of Zurich. It is a Swiss heritage site of national significance.

== See also ==
- List of castles in Switzerland
