= Hohenlandenberg Castle =

Castle in Zurich, Switzerland

Coordinates: 47°23′50″N 8°51′57″E

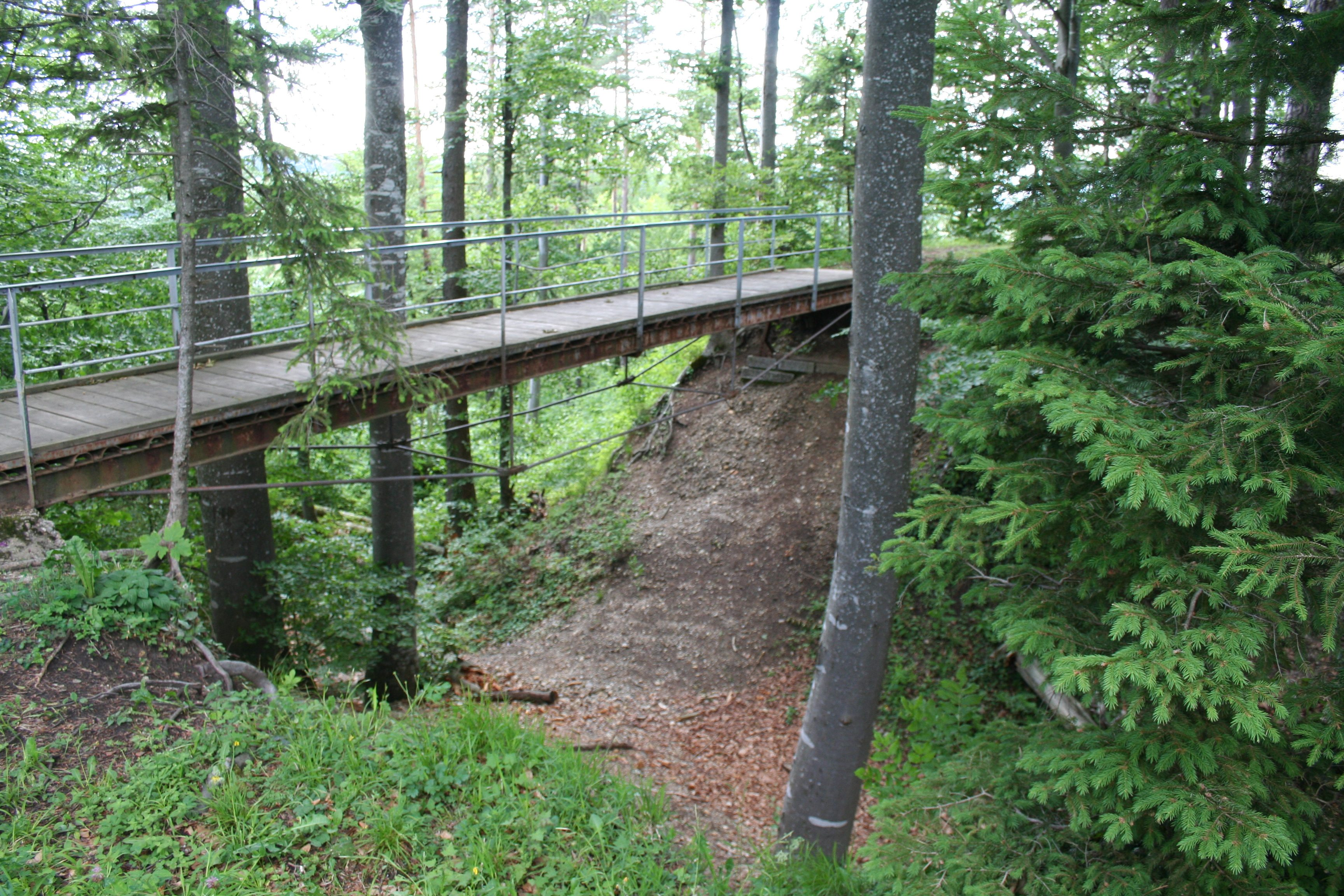
Hohenlandenberg Castle

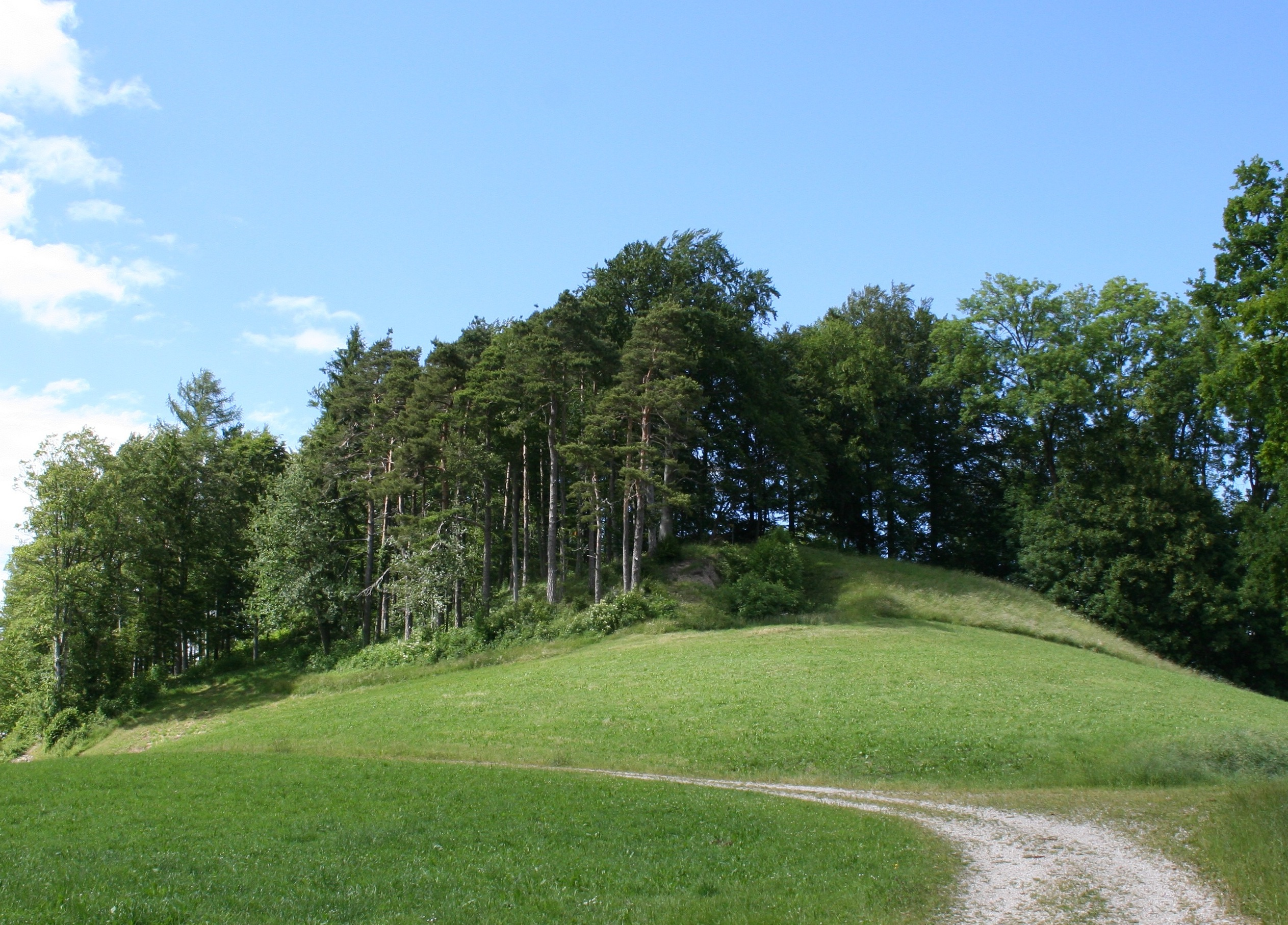
Hohenlandenberg Castle

Hohenlandenberg Castle (German: Ruine Hohenlandenberg) is a castle in the municipality of Wila and the canton of Zurich in Switzerland. It is a Swiss heritage site of national significance.

== See also ==
- List of castles in Switzerland
