= Baer House (Little Rock, Arkansas) =

Historic house in Arkansas, United States

- U.S. National Register of Historic Places
- U.S. Historic district – Contributing property
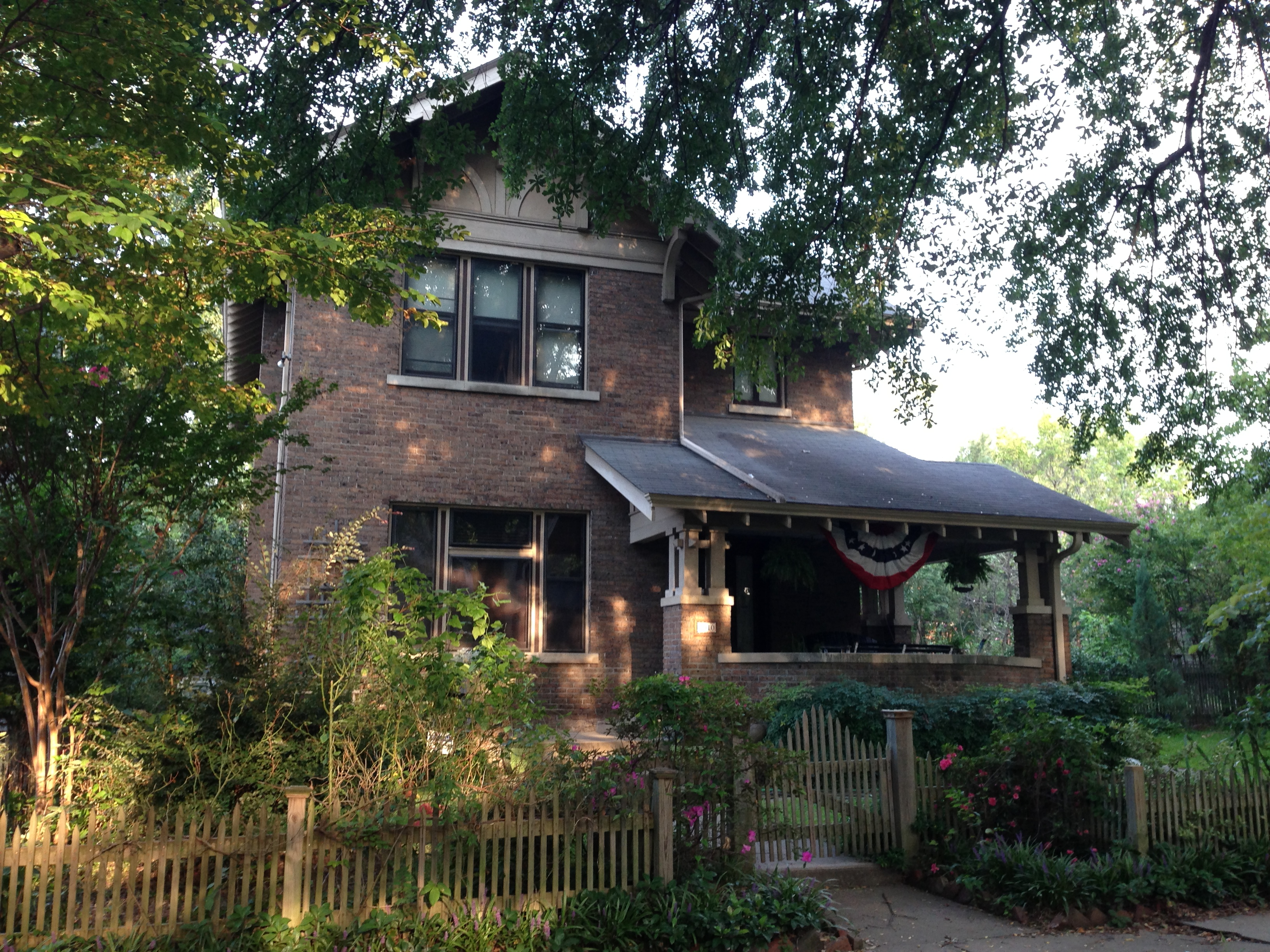

- Location within Arkansas Location within the United States
- Location: 1010 Rock Street, Little Rock, Arkansas
- Coordinates: 34°44′17″N 92°16′6″W
- Area: less than one acre
- Built: 1915
- Architect: Charles L. Thompson
- Architectural style: Bungalow/Craftsman
- Part of: MacArthur Park Historic District (ID77000269)
- MPS: Thompson, Charles L., Design Collection TR
- NRHP reference No.: 82000876

Significant dates
- Added to NRHP: December 22, 1982
- Designated CP: July 25, 1977

The Baer House is a historic house located at 1010 Rock Street in Little Rock, Arkansas.

== Description and history ==
It is a simple two-story L-shaped masonry structure, with a cross-gable roof configuration and a porch at the crook of the L. The front-facing gable has Craftsman-style brackets and half-timbering effects. The porch has a shed roof, and is supported by groups of short box columns set on tall brick piers, with a brick balustrade. The house was designed by the architect Charles L. Thompson, and was built about 1915.

The house was listed on the National Register of Historic Places on December 22, 1982. It was noted to have increased historical significance due to the finding of the original drawings for the home.

== See also ==
- National Register of Historic Places listings in Little Rock, Arkansas
