= Flaach Castle =

Castle in Zurich, Switzerland

Coordinates: 47°34′39″N 8°36′15″E

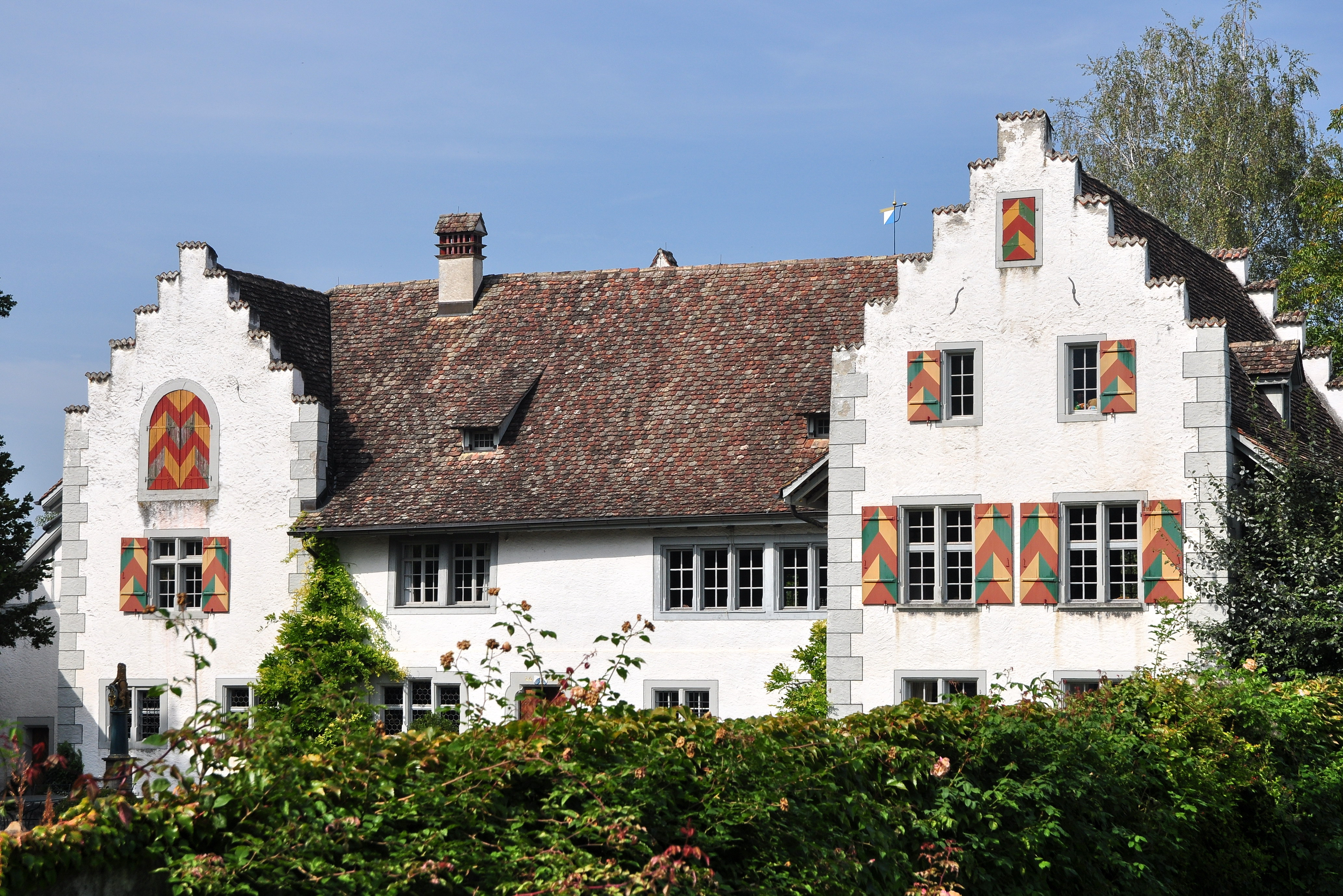
Flaach Castle

Flaach Castle (German: Schloss Flaach) is a castle in the municipality of Flaach in the Swiss canton of Zurich. It is a Swiss heritage site of national significance.

== See also ==
- List of castles in Switzerland
