= Eglisau-Glattfelden Power Station =

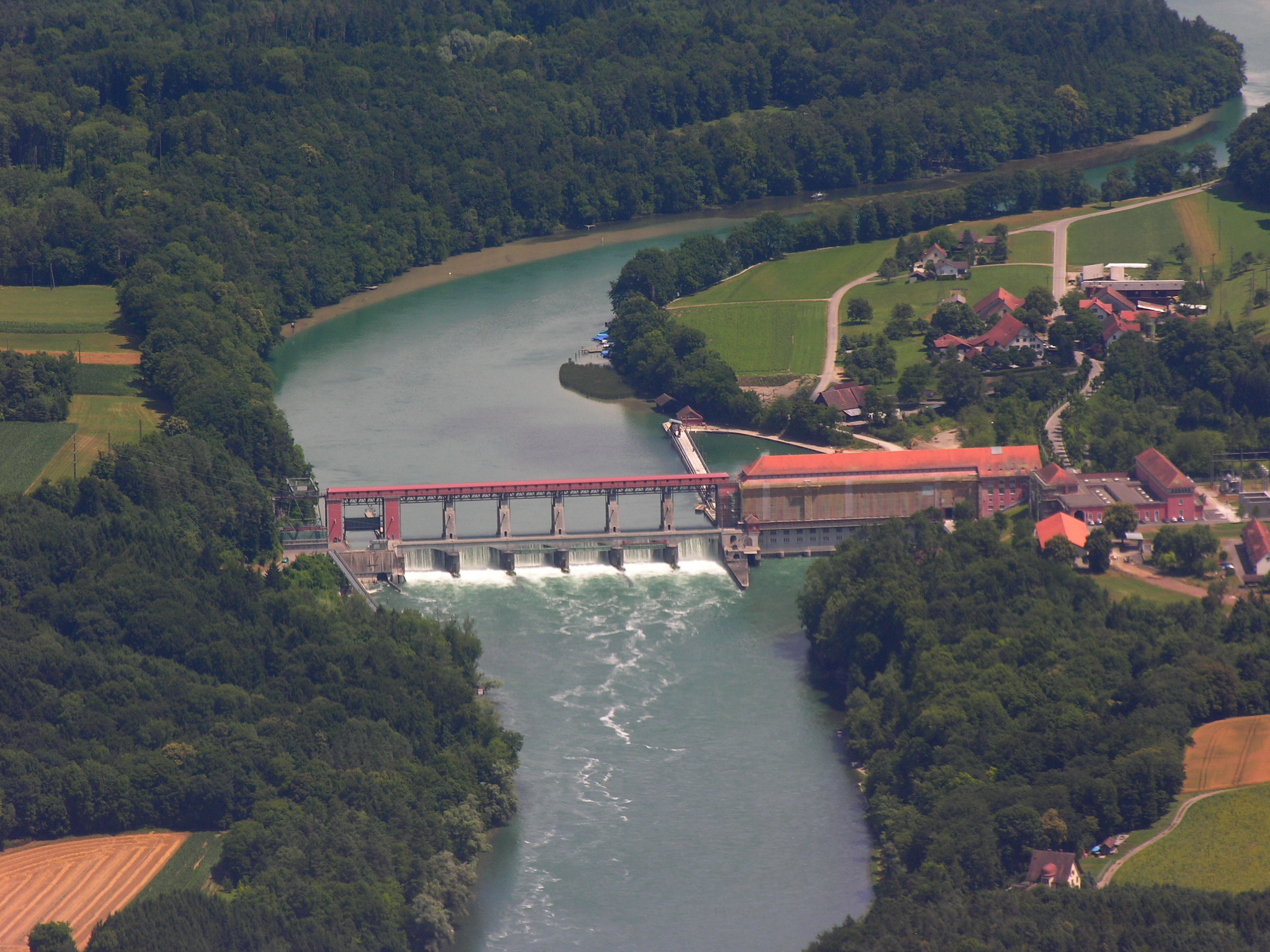
- Eglisau-Glattfelden Power Station viewed from the southwest

- Location within Switzerland
- Official name: Kraftwerk Eglisau-Glattfelden
- Country: Switzerland, Germany
- Coordinates: 47.5752°N 8.4728°E
- Construction began: 1915
- Opening date: 1920

Power Station
- Hydraulic head: 11 metres (36 ft)
- Annual generation: 318 GW·h

The Eglisau-Glattfelden Power Station (German: Kraftwerk Eglisau-Glattfelden), also known locally as Kraftwerk Rheinsfelden or Kraftwerk Rheinsfelden-Eglisau, is a hydroelectric power plant on the Rhine, on the German-Swiss border.

== Location ==
The power station is located about halfway between Eglisau and Hohentengen am Hochrhein, near the village of Rheinsfelden (in the municipality of Glattfelden). The power plant utilises the gradient between the mouths of the Thur and Glatt rivers, and its backwater reaches to the mouth of the Thur. Due to the Rhine forming the border of Switzerland and Germany, part of the facilities are located within Germany. The power generator building is located on the Swiss side.

== History ==
Initial studies for the construction of a power plant in the area were conducted from 1900 to 1910. Preparatory work began after the Zürcher and Schaffhauser electricity utilities received the 80-year concession in 1913 with the approval of the Grand Duchy of Baden. In 1914, the Nordostschweizerische Kraftwerke AG took over the concession. The plans for the station were created by the architects Gebrüder Pfister. Construction began in 1915. Several riverfront houses were evacuated to make way for the higher water level. For example, in the village of Oberriet, in Eglisau, 15 of the 17 buildings were demolished. Eglisau bridge needed to be rebuilt as well. The power station was built directly on the mouth of the Glatt, which was rerouted through tunnels into a lower area of the power plant. The tunnel began operation on January 16, 1916. The 114.5 m (376 ft) long tunnel has 6 openings, each with a width of 15.5 m (51 ft). The first construction section, an 18 m (59 ft) long section on the German side, contains a 12 m (39 ft) wide sluice for planned ship traffic. The power station first generated electricity on April 15, 1920. The maximum head was 11 m (36 ft), and the usable water flow was 390 m^{3}/s. In accordance with riverbank length, the state of Baden received 8% of the energy produced, with the cantons of Schaffhausen and Zurich receiving the other 92%.

The power station has been listed in the inventory of protected heritage objects since 1979. On December 16, 1998, a new concession was granted, which has been in force since April 1, 2002.

In 2012, the seven original Francis turbines were replaced with Kaplan turbines during a modernisation project. With a flow rate of 500 m^{3}/s, the new turbines together generate 43,4 MW of power, and produce an average of 318 GWh (1,140 TJ) of electricity yearly. The current concession ends on December 31, 2046.

Beginning in 2015, a new fish ladder and fish elevator were built over a period of two years, on the Swiss and German sides respectively.
