= Alt Wädenswil Castle =

Castle in Zurich, Switzerland

Coordinates: 47°12′47″N 8°41′03″E

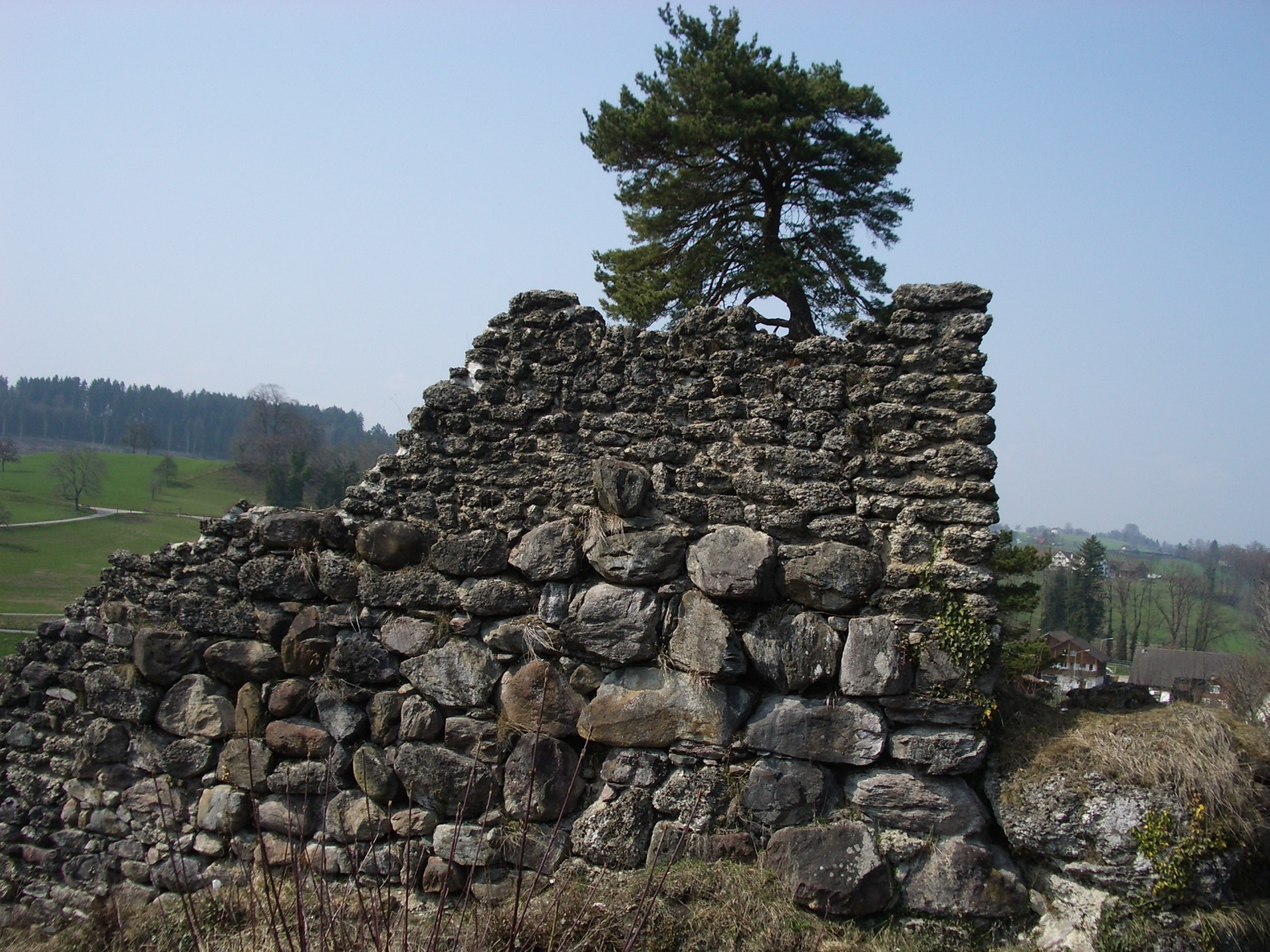
Alt Wädenswil Castle

Alt Wädenswil Castle (German: Ruine Alt-Wädenswil) is a castle in the municipality of Richterswil and the canton of Zurich in Switzerland. It is a Swiss heritage site of national significance.

== See also ==
- List of castles in Switzerland
