= Wülflingen Castle =

Castle in Winterthur, Switzerland

Coordinates: 47°30′40″N 8°41′57″E

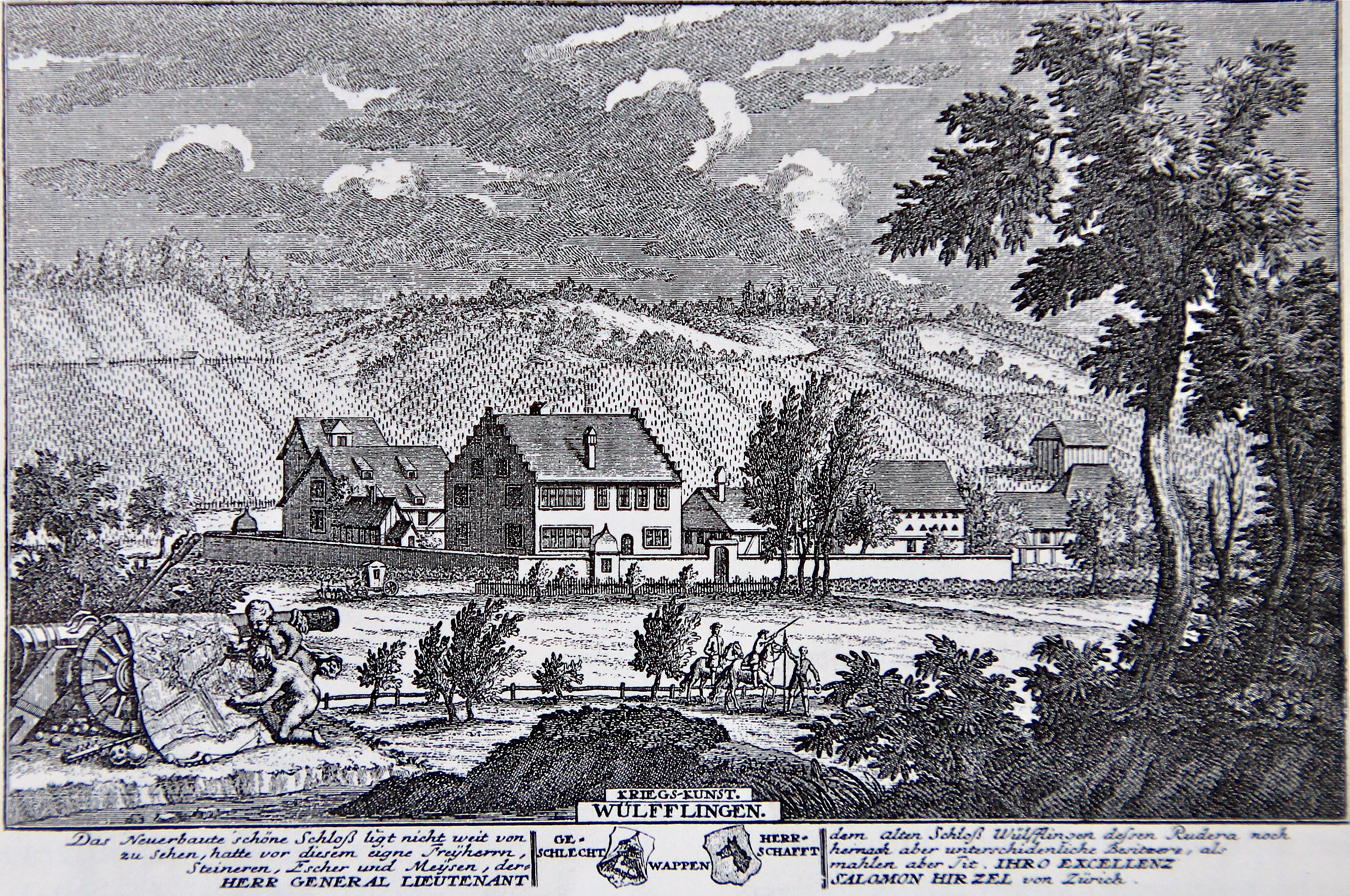
Schloss Wülflingen in 1754

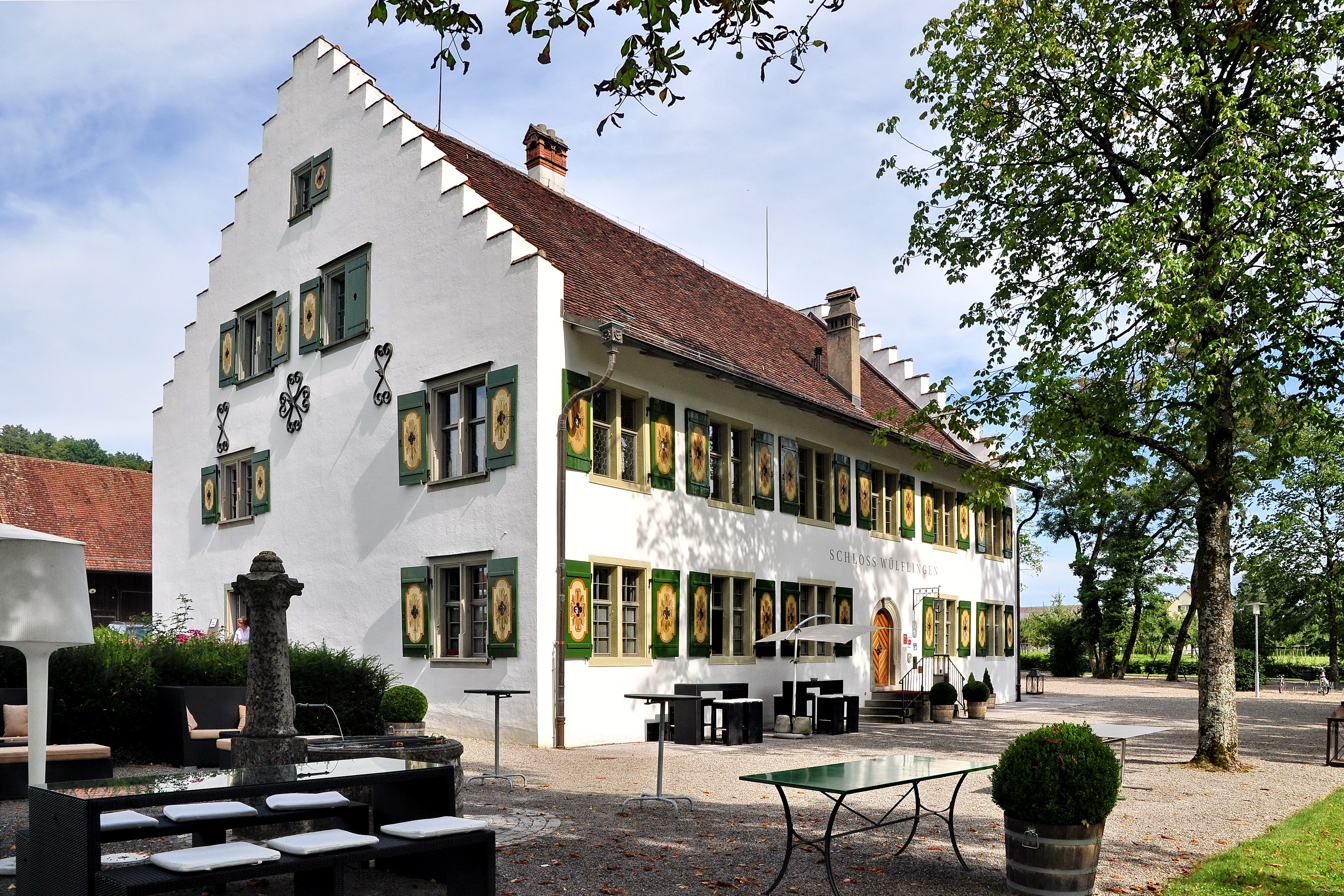
Schloss Wülflingen in 2011

Wülflingen Castle (German: Schloss Wülflingen) is a castle in the city of Winterthur and the canton of Zurich in Switzerland. It is a Swiss heritage site of national significance.

The Gottfried Keller Foundation aims the acquisition of major works from Switzerland and abroad, to entrust them as loans to Swiss museums or to return them to their original locations, such as the interior of Schloss Wülflingen. The collection comprises more than 8,500 paintings, sculptures and other art objects in around 110 museums respectively locations in Switzerland.
