= Wart Castle =

Castle in Zurich, Switzerland

Coordinates: 47°31′33″N 8°38′45″E

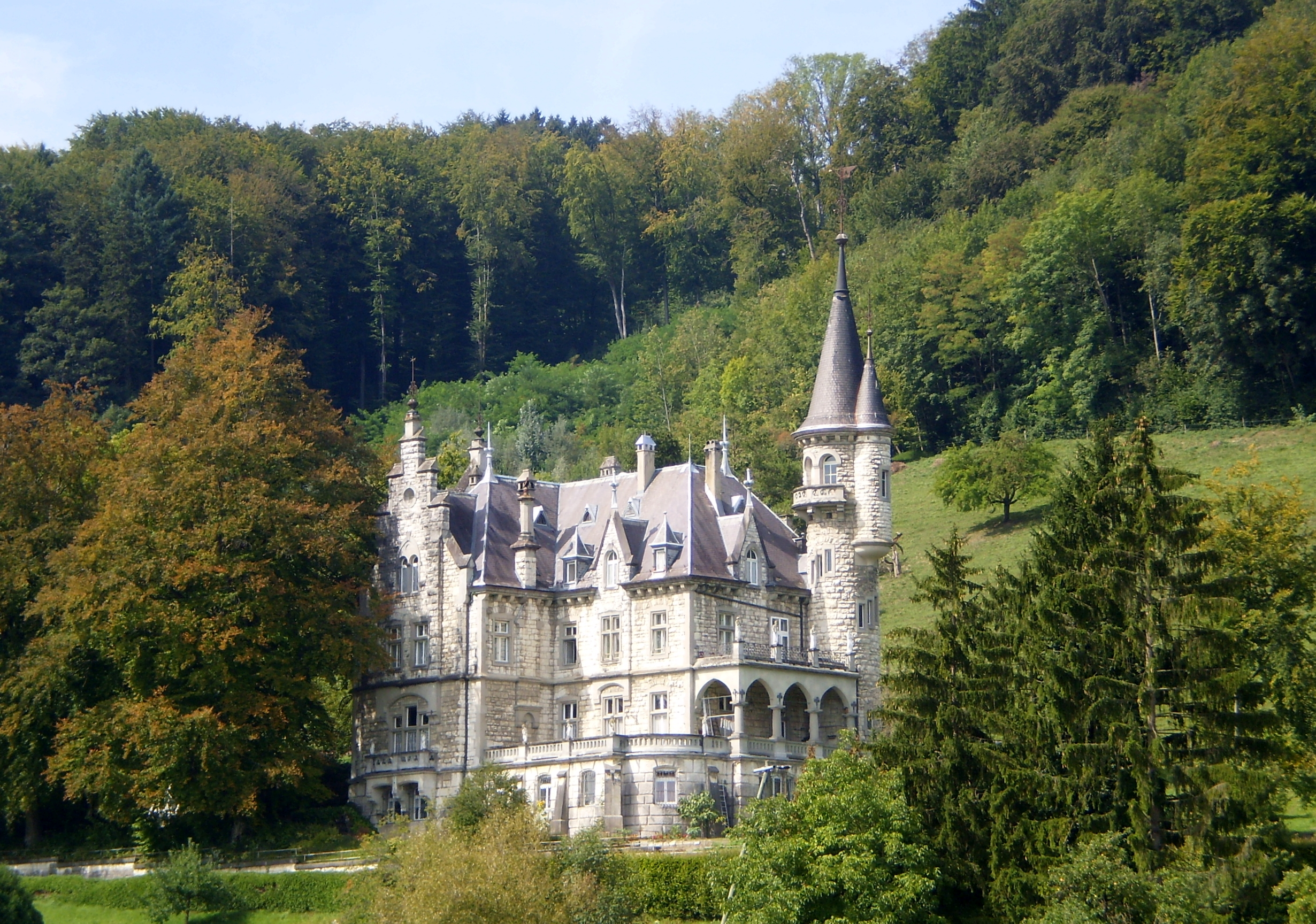
Wart Castle

Wart Castle (German: Schloss Wart) is a castle in the municipality of Neftenbach and the canton of Zurich in Switzerland. It is a Swiss heritage site of national significance.

== See also ==
- List of castles in Switzerland
