= David Hess (painter) =

Swiss writer, caricaturist and politician

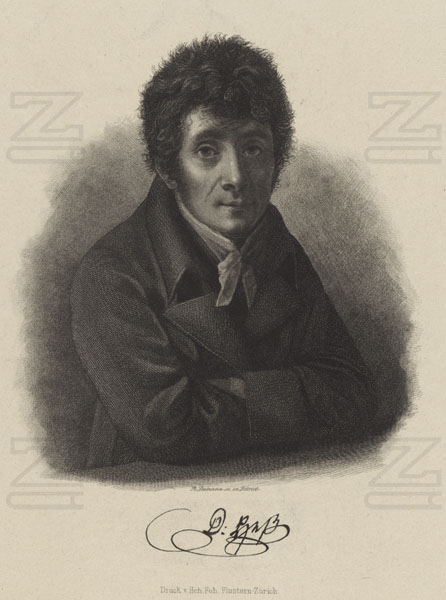
Portrait of David Hess, Drawing by Robert Leemann (1889)

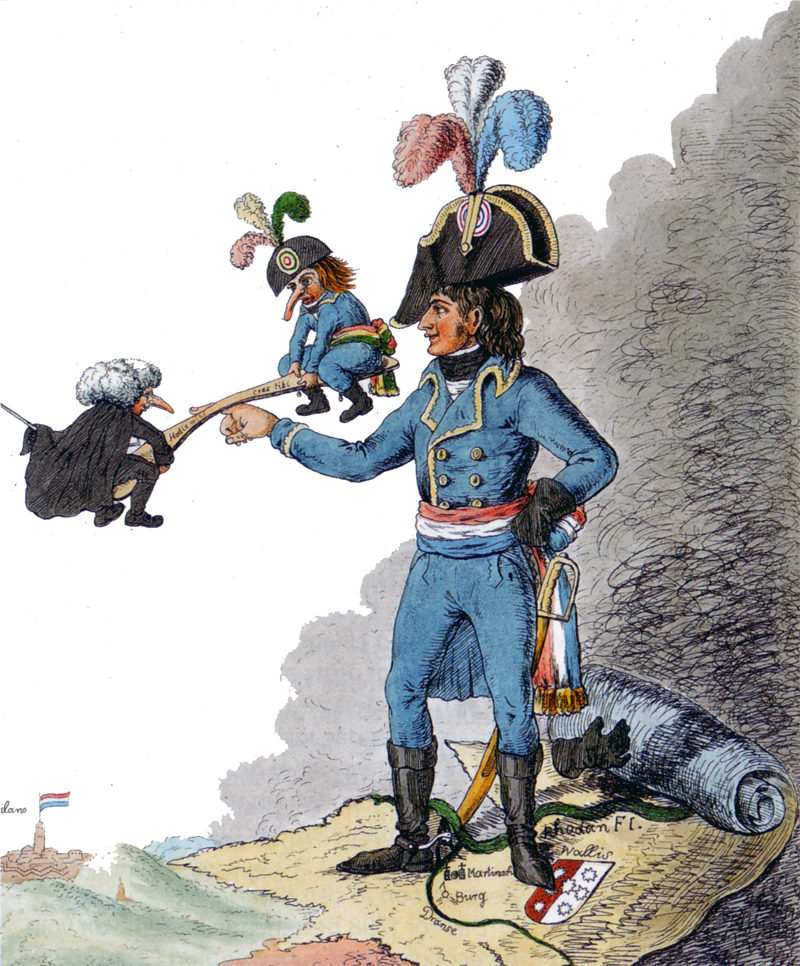
Caricature by David Hess, published in London under a pseudonym.

David Hess (29 November 1770 – 11 April 1843) was a Swiss writer, caricaturist, soldier and politician.

== Life ==
Hess was born on 29 November 1770 in Zurich, the son of Johann Rudolf Hess and Martha de la Tour. He grew up on his paternal family's estate, the Beckenhof, in Zurich's Unterstrass district. Hess' father was a Swiss officer in Dutch service, while his mother was the daughter of a French mining engineer. In accordance with his father's wishes, Hess followed a career as mercenary in Dutch service, joining a Swiss regiment of the Dutch States Army in 1787. He took part in a campaign in 1793 and returned to Zurich in 1796.

Hess saw the invasion of French troops and the end of the Old Swiss Confederation while serving as a captain with the Zurich troops in Aarberg, but did not take part in the Battle of Grauholz. In May of the following year he married Anna Hirzel. She died in 1802 after the birth of their second child. In 1805 he married Salome Vischer.

In September 1798 during the second battle for Zurich, foreign soldiers were quartered on his estate - an unpleasant consequence of the Helvetic Republic. He would later participate in a campaign against billeting. At the beginning of the mediation period in 1803, David Hess again took part in politics. From 1803 to 1830 he was a member of the Grand Council of Zurich, although he was not particularly active in it.

Hess had a wide circle of acquaintances, including Johann Martin Usteri, Johann Gottfried Ebel, the young Conrad Ferdinand Meyer, and Philipp Christoph Kayser. As a member of the Zurich artist's society, he was considered an anchor of the city's cultural life. In his last years he withdrew more and more into reading. He died on 11 April 1843 at his estate in Zurich.

== Works ==
In 1795 a collection of twenty cartoons called Hollandia Regenerata were published in London. These criticized the Batavian Republic. Another target of his many unpublished cartoons were the Zurich government and Napoleon Bonaparte. In 1801 he published a successful collection of caricatures under the pseudonym David Hildebrand.

In addition to his own diary, Hess wrote a biography of Salomon Landolt, the governor of Greifensee. In his entertaining 1818 work "Badenfahrt" (Trip to Baden), Hess described the city of Baden and its baths. He also drew all of its illustrations.

He remained a sharp critic of post-revolutionary conditions and democratic aspirations. In 1832, when protesters of the Industrial Revolution set fire to a mechanical spinning factory in Uster, he commented mockingly:

"You know the people aren't too bright
when even in broad daylight,
the party in Uster couldn't be celebrated
until it were illuminated."
