= Susette =

Susette may refer to:

- Susette La Flesche, also called Inshata Theumba (1854–1903), Native American writer, lecturer, interpreter and artist
- Susette Gontard (1769–1802), dubbed Diotima by the German poet Friedrich Hölderlin, the inspiration for Hölderlin's novel Hyperion
- Susette Hirzel, known as Susette (1769–1858), Swiss painter
- Susette Schultz Keast (1892–1932), American painter
- Mari Susette Sandoz (1896–1966), Nebraska novelist, biographer, lecturer, and teacher

== See also ==
- Suzette (given name)
