= Landenberg =

Swiss noble family

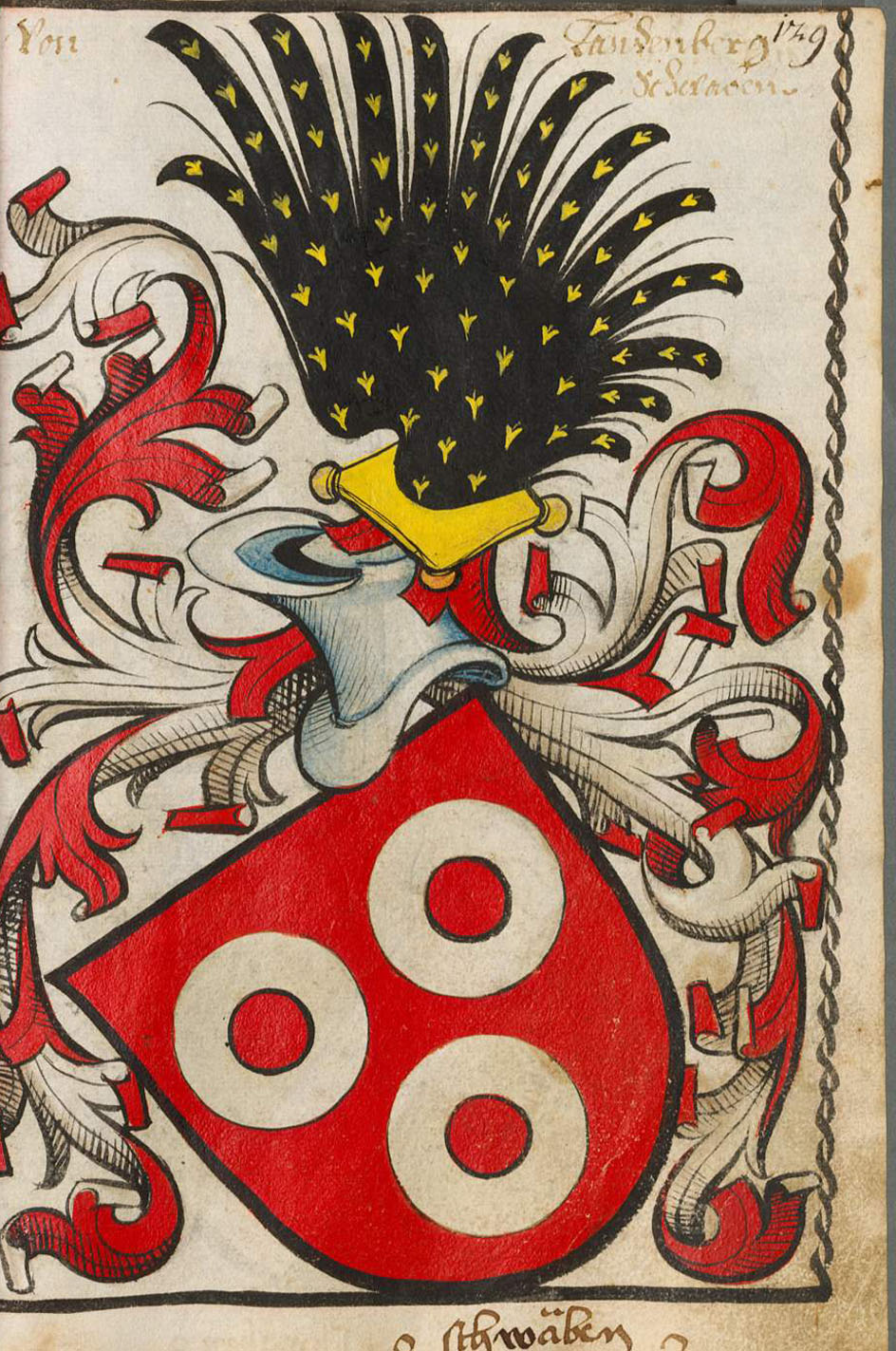
The Landenberg coat of arms in the 15th century

The Landenberg family was a noble family in medieval Switzerland.

== History ==
By the beginning 14th century, they were the most powerful family of eastern Switzerland, separating into four lines, Alt-Landenberg, Landenberg-Greifensee, Hohenlandenberg and Breitenlandenberg. The main line was extinct early, Rudolf I and his son Pantaleon both falling in the battle of Morgarten in 1315. The Landenberg-Greifensee line was the most successful during the 14th century but was outlived by the Hohenladenberg and Breitenlandenberg ones. Breitenlandenberg proved the most successful in the longer run, rising to significant power in the 15th century and lasting into the 19th.

The influence of the Landenberg-Greifensee line peaked in the 1350s with Hermann IV, whose sons came into financial difficulties and had to sell a number of castles, among them Alt-Landenberg and Greifensee. The reasons for this decline was their close ties with the house of Habsburg, which was itself struggling with difficulties and losing its hold over the territory due to both the rise of the city of Zürich and the growth of the Old Swiss Confederacy.

The Breitenlandenberg and Hohenlandenberg lines overcame this crisis by allying themselves with Zürich, adopting Zürich citizenship. Their territorial influence remained confined to the Zürcher Oberland due to the pressure of territorial expansion from both Zürich and the Swiss Confederacy, but by the end of the 14th century they became again very wealthy and gave out major credits to the cities of Winterthur and Constance.

The Hohenlandenberg line owned Andelfingen until 1434. The Breitenlandenberg line rose to great importance in Zürichgau in the 15th century. They had Zürich citizenship from the 14th century, and often intermarried with families of the Zürich patriciate like Schäfli. They also entered the Old Zürich War on the side of Zürich, and Wildhans von Breitenlandenberg was beheaded with his entire garrison at the siege of Greifensee in 1444. The knights of Breitenlandenberg also fought with Zürich, this time on the side of the Swiss, in the Burgundy Wars. They declined from the 16th century and sold the ancestral Breitenlandeberg castle in the 17th century, residing mostly in Zürich, although they retained jurisdiction in a number of communes, at Salenstein into the 18th century. The male line of Breitenlandenberg was extinct in the 1870s.

== Alt-Landenberg ==
- Beringer, fl. 1209
- Rudolf I, d. 1315

== Landenberg-Greifensee ==
- Hermann I
- Hermann II (d. 1306)
- Hermann IV (d. 1361), son of Hermann II, married Elisabeth of Schellenberg (d. 1340) and Diemut von Roteneck

== Hohenlandenberg ==
the current coat of arms of the Wila municipality is directly based on the Landenberg coat of arms

- Beringer II, known for his belligerence and fraud, which resulted in the castle of Hohenlandenberg being destroyed in 1344
- Jakob, married Barbara of Hegi
  - sons Ulrich and Hugo IV, the latter bishop of Constance in 1496
- Ulrich

== Breitenlandenberg ==
- Hermann I (d. before 1377), married Adelheid of Radegg-Blumberg. From 1330 at Turbenthal.
- Albrecht I (d. 1388, at the battle of Näfels), married Verena of Ebersberg
- Hermann IV "Schöch" (d. 1437), married Ursula Truchsess of Diessenhofen
  - sons of Hermann IV were Hermann, bishop of Constance, Kaspar, abbot of St. Gall abbey, Wildhans von Breitenlandenberg who fell in the Old Zürich War, and Rudolf V.
- Rudolf V (d. 1460), married Agathe Muntprat (d. 1505)
- Frischhans (1446-1516), married Margaretha of Büsingen
- Hans (d. 1540), married Blanchefleur of Rechberg, knighted in 1476 at the battle of Grandson
- Johann Rudolf (d. 1551)
- Hans Rudolf (d. 1606)
- Hans Dietrich (1571-1620), at Salenstein
- Hartmann Friedrich (1617-1677) at Salenstein
- Wolf Dietrich I (1655-1733), at Salenstein
- Wolf Dietrich (1712-1796), at Salenstein
- Hans Caspar (1735-1798)
