= Factory legislation in Switzerland =

Swiss laws regulating factory work

In Switzerland, factory legislation (German: Fabrikgesetze; French: lois sur les fabriques; Italian: leggi sulle fabbriche) regulated work in factories. The first attempts, at the beginning of the 19th century, concerned almost exclusively child labor and remained a cantonal matter until 1874. The federal Factory Act of 1877 came into force in 1878, was amended in 1905 and 1919, and was replaced in 1964 by the Labor Act (German: Arbeitsgesetz, ArG).

== Early regulation ==
Controversies over the blessings and curses of industrialization had already begun in the 18th century. However, the problems that came with it troubled the public above all after the Uster fire (Usterbrand) of 1832, and occupied it as the social question until the last third of the 19th century. The first attempts to regulate factory work go back to the take-off of the Swiss economy at the beginning of the 19th century, but they concerned almost exclusively child labor. This area also remained a cantonal competence until the Federal Constitution of 1874. By 1877, only nine cantons had legislated on the protection of young people, and three on the protection of women workers. The Glarus factory law of 1864, which introduced the 12-hour day, was a milestone.

== Factory Act of 1877 ==
A need for action across the country arose after a first survey, conducted at the suggestion of the Swiss Society for the Common Good, had revealed the catastrophic working and living conditions of factory workers. Measures for worker protection now became an integral part of a comprehensive "politics of the body" (Körperpolitik) that was intended to preserve the health of the population. A report on the situation of factory workers, written in 1868 by the economist Victor Böhmert, led Wilhelm Joos, a member of the National Council, to submit a motion in the same year for the creation of a federal factory law. The Federal Constitution of 1874 (Article 34) gave the Confederation legislative competence in this field. After a broad consultation (Vernehmlassung) with more than 60 submissions and a fierce referendum campaign, the Federal Act on Factory Work, the Factory Act of 1877, was narrowly approved in 1877 by 181,000 votes to 170,000; it came into force in 1878. The debate was dominated by the discussion about a general standard for working hours. By contrast, there were hardly any differences over the protective provisions for women.

First, the Factory Act subjected working conditions, with a normal working day of eleven hours (ten on Saturdays), and the liability of employers for bodily harm (accidents and occupational diseases, Gewerbekrankheiten), to protective norms of public law and partly of private law. Second, the act initiated a general reduction of working hours. Third, it introduced special protection for women and generalized the protection of children. The act was a first intervention by the public authorities in the internal order of the factory, a domain that had until then been regarded as belonging exclusively to the employers' private sphere. From then on, factory regulations were checked by the cantons, which were responsible for enforcing the act. In addition, a federal factory inspectorate was created to ensure that the provisions of the act were monitored.

== Revisions ==
The road to general enforcement, above all of the provisions on working hours, was long and arduous, however. Other shortcomings were remedied by special laws that regulated, besides liability, matters such as health insurance. In 1905, with the Saturday work amendment (Samstagsarbeitsnovelle), the legislature reduced working hours on Saturdays to nine. Even before its adoption, the National Council accepted a motion for a revision of the Factory Act submitted by Fritz Studer (SP), whereupon the Federal Council instructed the factory inspectors to present a draft. After lengthy debates, the revised Factory Act was passed by the federal parliament in 1914, but because of the First World War it did not come into force. In 1919 the act was modified, owing to the strong socio-political pressure of the time and through an amendment introducing the 48-hour week; it came into force in 1920. Besides the substantial reduction in working hours, women were now prohibited from certain tasks that endangered their health, and the amount of overtime required of them was limited; in addition, women who ran a household were prohibited from auxiliary work that went beyond the length of the ordinary working day. The eight-week ban on work for women before and after childbirth was reduced to six weeks after the birth, and this protection period (Schonzeit), which could be extended to eight weeks on request, was combined with a ban on dismissal. From 1925, women workers who ran a household had to be given Saturday afternoon off if they so wished.

== Replacement by the Labor Act ==
It was not until 1964 that another major law for the protection of labor was passed: the Federal Act on Work in Industry, Trade and Commerce (Labor Act, Arbeitsgesetz), which replaced the Factory Act. In 1998 it was revised in a popular vote toward greater flexibility of work, after a first attempt at revision had been defeated by a trade-union referendum in 1996. The new Labor Act lifted the ban on night work for women and extended the working time not requiring a permit to 11 p.m., which allows two-shift operation without a permit.

== Bibliography ==
- Volkswirtschaft, Arbeitsrecht und Sozialversicherung der Schweiz, 2 vols., 1925 (with bibliography)
- V. Schiwoff, Die Beschränkung der Arbeitszeit durch die kantonale Gesetzgebung und durch das erste eidgenössische Fabrikgesetz von 1877, 1952
- Handbuch der schweizerischen Volkswirtschaft, 1, 1955, 107–150, 922–927
- H. Dällenbach, Kantone, Bund und Fabrikgesetzgebung, 1961
- R. Braun, Sozialer und kultureller Wandel in einem ländlichen Industriegebiet (Zürcher Oberland) unter Einwirkung des Maschinen- und Fabrikwesens im 19. und 20. Jahrhundert, 1965
- E. Gruner, Die Arbeiter in der Schweiz im 19. Jahrhundert, 2nd ed., 1980, especially 227–257
- D. Grobéty, La Suisse aux origines du droit ouvrier, 1979
