= Susette Hirzel =

Swiss artist (1769-1858)

- Born: Susanna Hirzel; 10 January 1769; Zurich, Switzerland
- Died: 9 January 1858 (aged 88); Zurich, Switzerland
- Occupation: Painter
- Known for: Portrait painting
- Spouse: Hans Conrad Ott

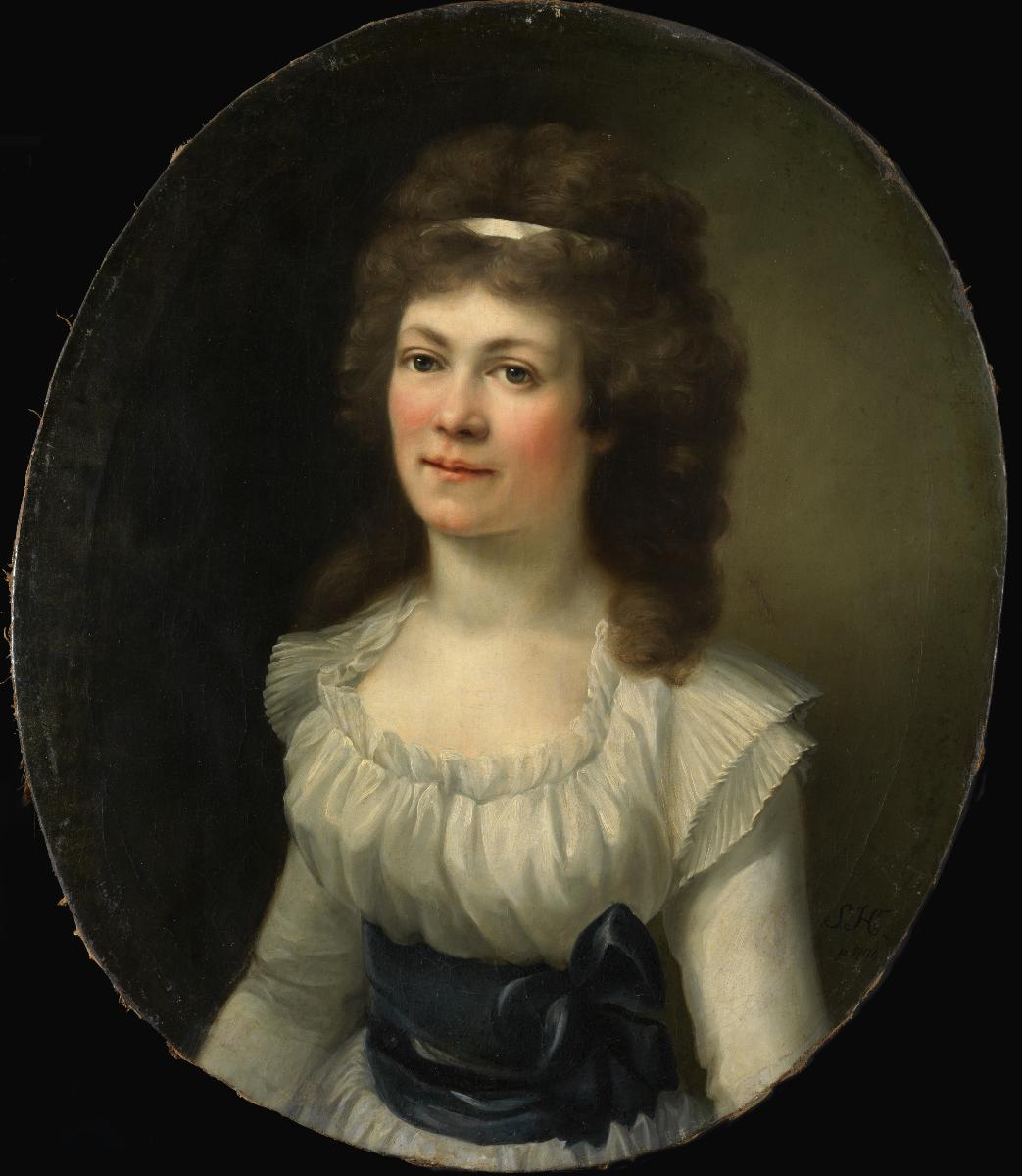
Portrait of Maria Barbara Schulthess, 1794

Susanna Hirzel, known as Susette Hirzel (10 January 1769 – 9 January 1858), was a Swiss portrait painter from Zurich. Born into a prominent Zurich family, she was active mainly during the 1790s and exhibited with the Zürcher Künstlergesellschaft in 1799 and 1801. Her known artistic activity lasted roughly ten years, and no work by her is documented after 1801. Hirzel is regarded as an important Swiss woman artist of her generation.

== Biography ==
Susanna Hirzel, known as Susette Hirzel, was born in Zurich on 10 January 1769. She was the daughter of Hans Conrad Hirzel, who held civic offices in Zurich, and Susanna Escher vom Glas. She was the fourth of five children and grew up in Zurich and at the family estate Zum Traubenberg in Zollikon.

Hirzel showed artistic ability early, but her training remained informal. Her family supported her interest in art, and her brother Caspar sent her engravings by well-known artists to copy. She briefly studied with Johann Balthasar Bullinger the Elder and, from 1790, was taught by the German portrait painter August Friedrich Oelenhainz, who was then living in Zurich.

During the 1790s, Hirzel was active as a portrait painter, and in 1799 and 1801 she took part in exhibitions of the Zürcher Künstlergesellschaft. As a woman from a prominent family, she could not accept commissions or sell her pictures, and her artistic activity declined around 1800. In 1801, she married Hans Conrad Ott, a Zurich councillor, and widower with two sons. No artistic activity by Hirzel is documented after that date. She died in Zurich on 9 January 1858.

== Work ==
Hirzel worked as a portrait painter. Her known artistic activity lasted roughly ten years. During the 1790s, she painted many portraits of people in her family and wider social circle. She also portrayed prominent Zurich figures, including David Hess and Salomon Landolt.

Only a limited part of Hirzel’s work is publicly accessible today, as many works are lost and most of the remaining works are privately owned. Her portraits have been associated with sensibility and Classicism, with an emphasis on individual character rather than social rank. She is regarded as an important Swiss woman artist of her generation.

Works by Hirzel are held by the City of Biel Art Collection, Kunsthaus Zürich and the Graphische Sammlung of the Zentralbibliothek Zürich.
