= Henggart =

- Municipality
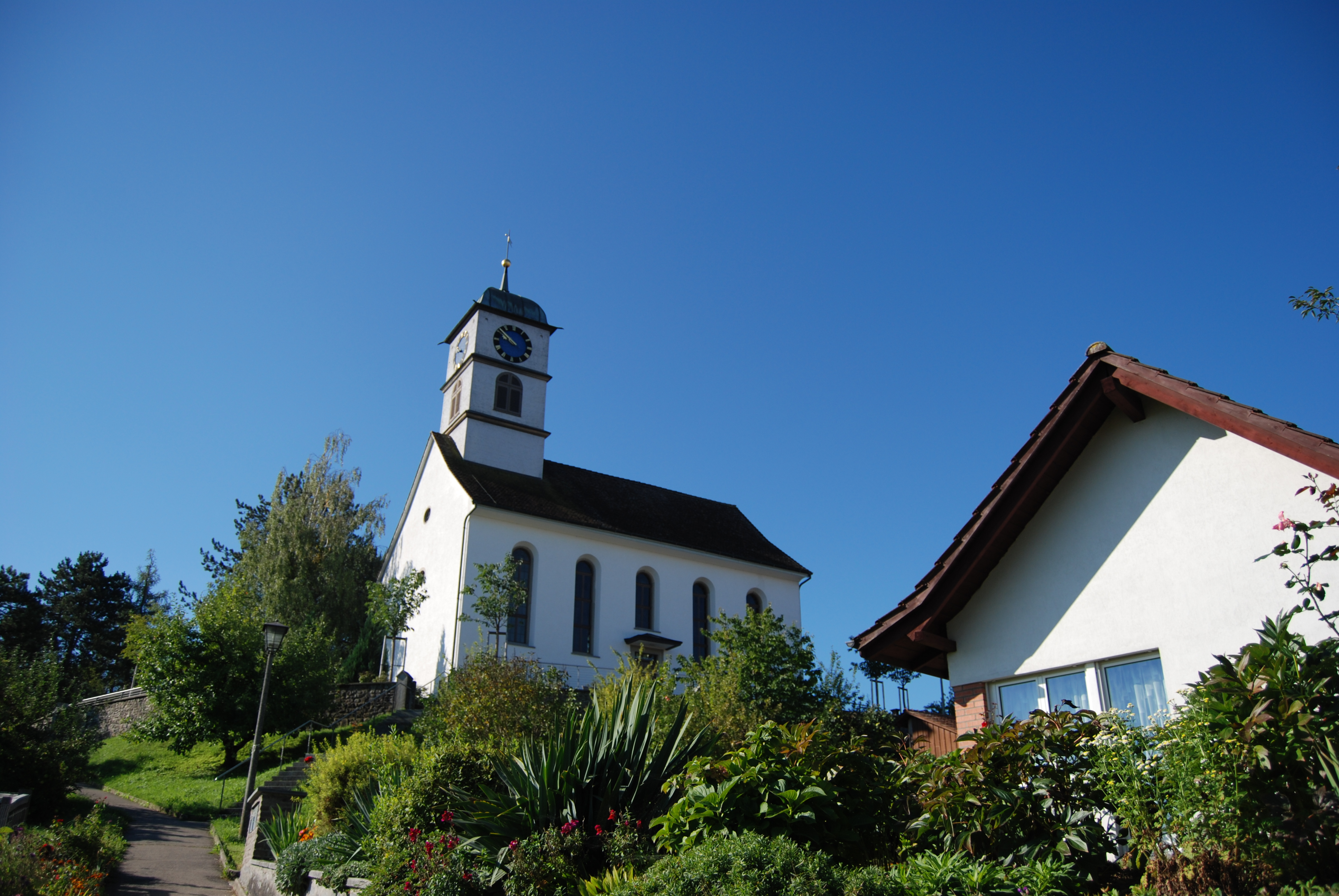

- Flag Coat of arms
- Location of Henggart
- Location within Switzerland Location within Canton of Zurich
- Coordinates: 47°34′N 8°41′E
- Country: Switzerland
- Canton: Zurich
- District: Andelfingen

Area
  - Total: 3.01 km^{2} (1.16 sq mi)
- Elevation: 440 m (1,440 ft)

Population (December 2020)
  - Total: 2,293
  - Density: 762/km^{2} (1,970/sq mi)
- Time zone: UTC+01:00 (CET)
  - Summer (DST): UTC+02:00 (CEST)
- Postal code: 8444
- SFOS number: 31
- ISO 3166 code: CH-ZH
- Surrounded by: Dägerlen, Hettlingen, Humlikon, Neftenbach
- Website: www.henggart.ch

Henggart is a municipality in the district of Andelfingen in the canton of Zürich in Switzerland.

== History ==
Henggart is first mentioned in 1228 as de Hengart.

== Geography ==
Aerial view from 300 m by Walter Mittelholzer (1923)

Henggart has an area of 3.1 km^{2} (1.2 sq mi). Of this area, 56.5% is used for agricultural purposes, while 19.9% is forested. The rest of the land, (23.5%) is settled.

== Demographics ==
Henggart has a population (as of 31 December 2020) of 2,293. As of 2007, 7.9% of the population was made up of foreign nationals. Over the last 10 years the population has grown at a rate of 31.4%. Most of the population (as of 2000) speaks German (94.4%), with Albanian being second most common ( 1.5%) and Italian being third ( 1.0%).

In the 2007 election the most popular party was the SVP which received 45.8% of the vote. The next three most popular parties were the SPS (14.3%), the FDP (11.5%) and the CSP (11.4%).

The age distribution of the population (as of 2000) is children and teenagers (0–19 years old) make up 26.3% of the population, while adults (20–64 years old) make up 61.9% and seniors (over 64 years old) make up 11.8%. In Henggart about 85.6% of the population (between age 25-64) have completed either non-mandatory upper secondary education or additional higher education (either university or a Fachhochschule).

Henggart has an unemployment rate of 1.57%. As of 2005, there were 35 people employed in the primary economic sector and about 14 businesses involved in this sector. 67 people are employed in the secondary sector and there are 14 businesses in this sector. 248 people are employed in the tertiary sector, with 48 businesses in this sector. The historical population is given in the following table:

year	population
1733	290
1850	279
1910	388
1950	464
1960	712
1980	970
2000	1,621

== Transportation ==
Henggart railway station is a stop of the S-Bahn Zürich on the line S33.
