= Salomon Landolt =

Swiss painter (1741–1818)

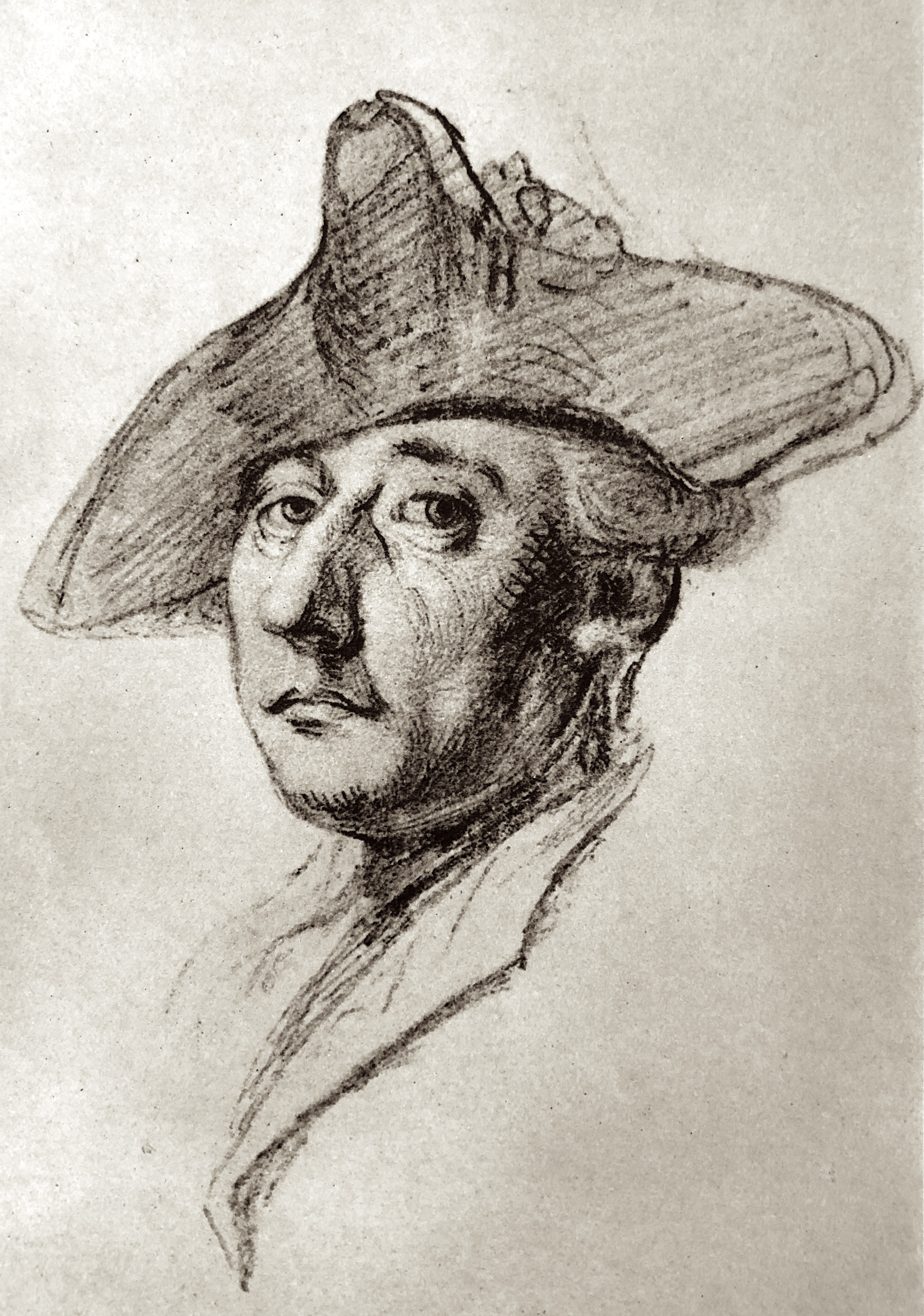
- Portrait by Johann Rudolf Füssli
- Born: 10 December 1741; Zürich, Switzerland
- Died: 26 November 1818 (aged 76); Andelfingen, Switzerland
- Occupations: Military officer, bailiff, politician, painter

Salomon Landolt (10 December 1741 – 26 November 1818) was a Swiss military officer, bailiff, politician and painter. He was elected to the Zürich city court, served as bailiff of Greifensee and Eglisau, and was involved in the reform of Zürich's military organisation. As a painter, he worked mainly in gouache and made military, hunting and landscape scenes. Gottfried Keller later portrayed him in the novella Der Landvogt von Greifensee.

== Biography ==
Salomon Landolt was born on 10 December 1741 in Zürich. He was the son of Johannes Landolt, chief bailiff of Hüttlingen, and remained unmarried. He was born into a family whose members held political and military offices.

In 1753 and 1754, Landolt received private lessons in Zürich alongside Johann Jakob Hess and Johann Heinrich Füssli. He then received military training at Wellenberg in Thurgau until 1764, while also taking lessons in portrait drawing from Johann Jakob Wirz. From 1764, he trained at the military academy in Metz, where he met the French battle painter Jean-Baptiste Le Paon. Landolt later spent time in Paris, Holland and Berlin.

In 1767, Landolt was elected to the Zürich city court. He joined the Mathematisch-Militärische Gesellschaft in Zürich in 1767 and became its secretary the following year. He was appointed lieutenant colonel in 1778 and given command of Zürich’s Jäger corps. He became involved in military reform and was associated with the development of Zürich's sharpshooter corps.

Landolt served as bailiff of Greifensee from 1781 to 1787 and of Eglisau from 1795 to 1798. In 1798, after the political changes of the Helvetic Republic, Landolt lost his official posts. He then gave more attention to painting, teaching and exhibiting his work. During the Mediation period, he was a member of the Zürich Grand Council. He died in Andelfingen on 26 November 1818.

== Painting ==
Salomon Landolt worked mainly in gouache, and only two oil paintings by him are known. His subjects ranged from military and hunting scenes to riders, field guards and quieter landscapes, including moonlit compositions. He developed his gouache technique through experimentation, with an emphasis on durable colour and luminous effects.

Military scenes that Landolt witnessed around Zürich in the late 1790s later became subjects in his paintings. Some of his works were later engraved by Franz Hegi.

About fifty works on paper are known from Landolt’s late period, while no works are known from his early or middle periods. One example of his landscape painting is Nächtliche Pferdeweide beim Kloster Wettingen, which shows horses, figures by water and a moonlit landscape near Wettingen Abbey. Works by Landolt are held in collections including the Aargauer Kunsthaus, Museen Maur, Kunstmuseum Winterthur and the Zentralbibliothek Zürich.

== Legacy ==
Landolt was later the subject of a biographical work by David Hess. Gottfried Keller portrayed him in the novella Der Landvogt von Greifensee.

== Gallery ==
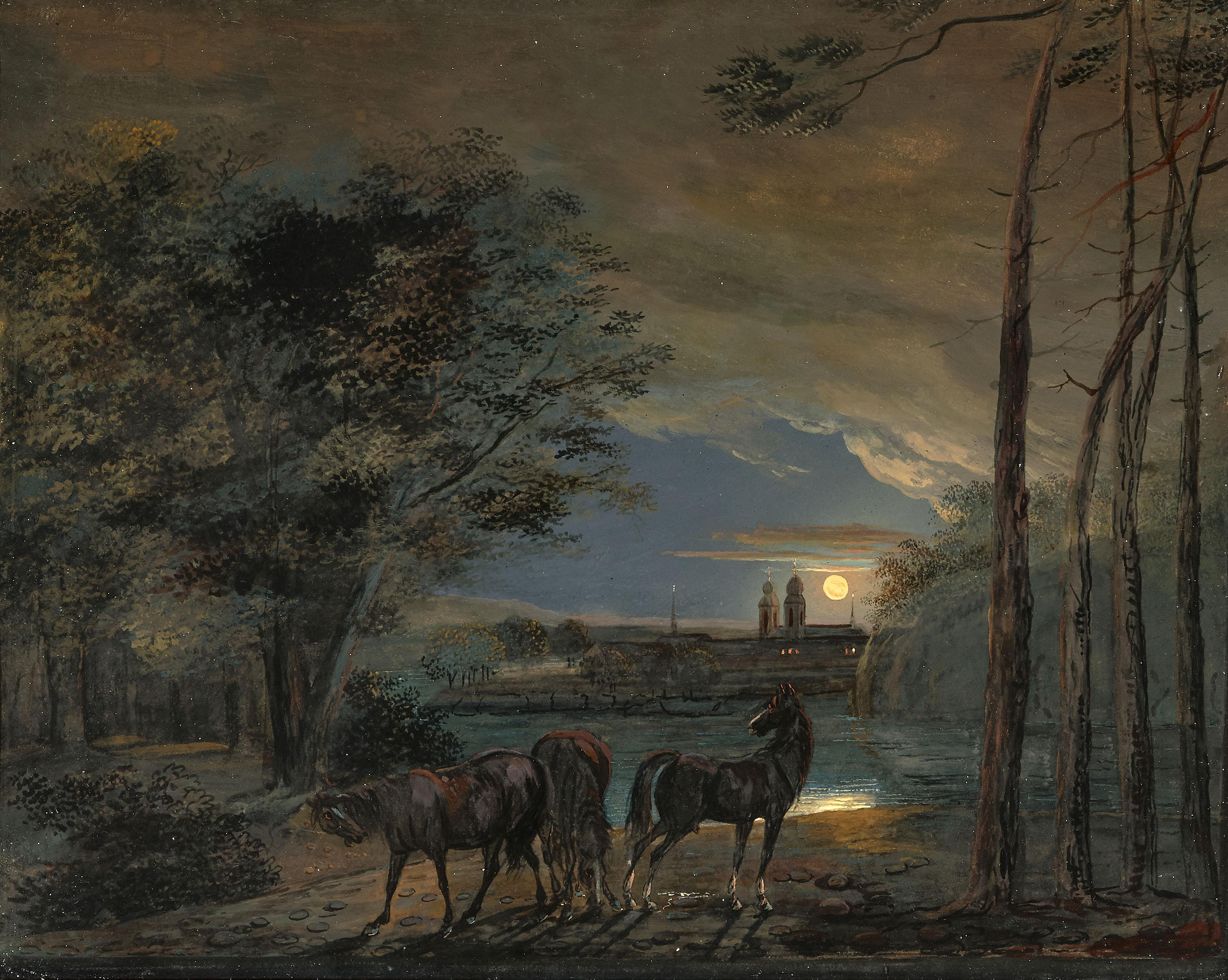
View of Rheinau Abbey by moonlight

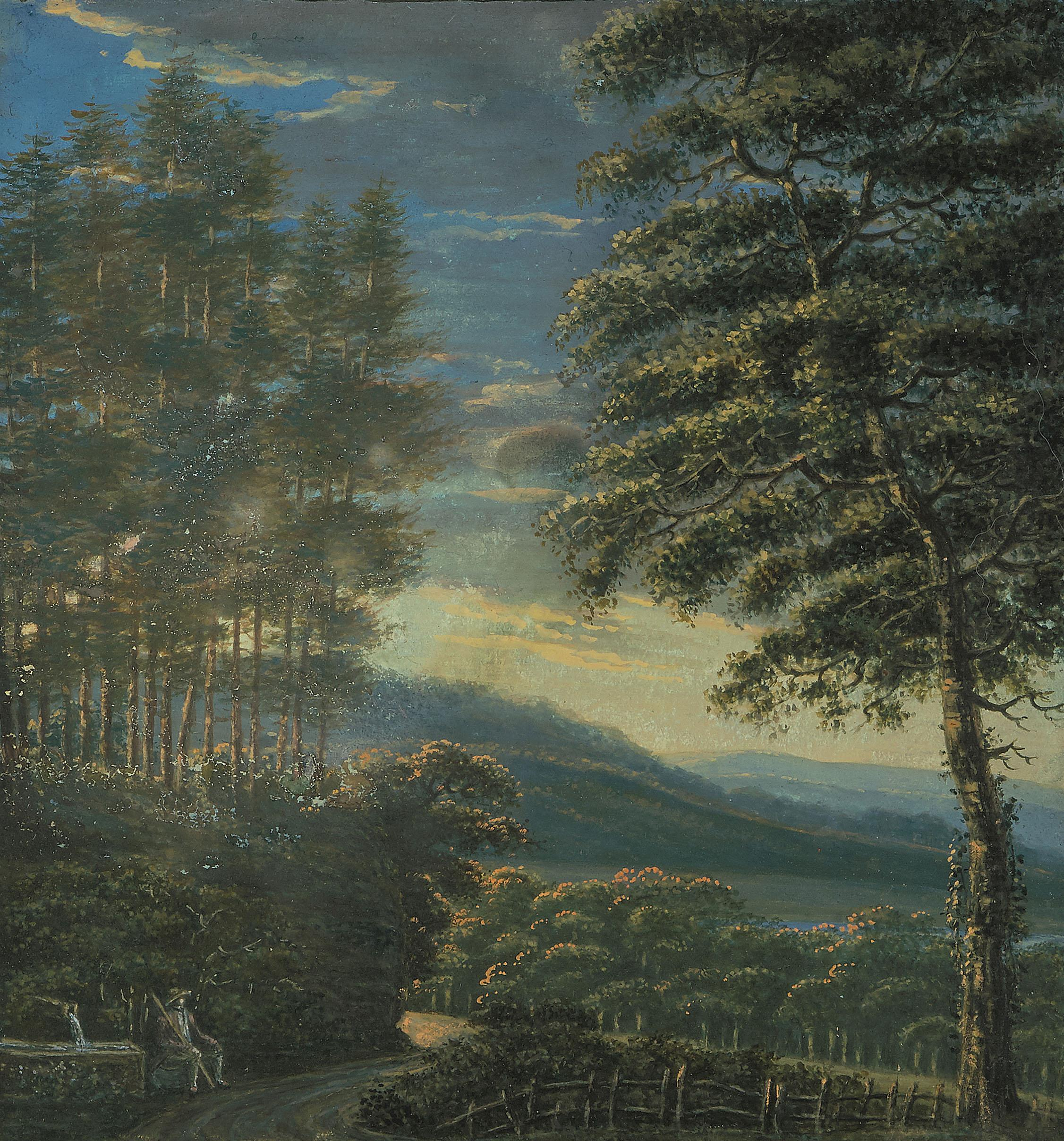
Traveller resting by a fountain in a wooded, hilly landscape near Zürich
