= Hettlingen =

- Municipality
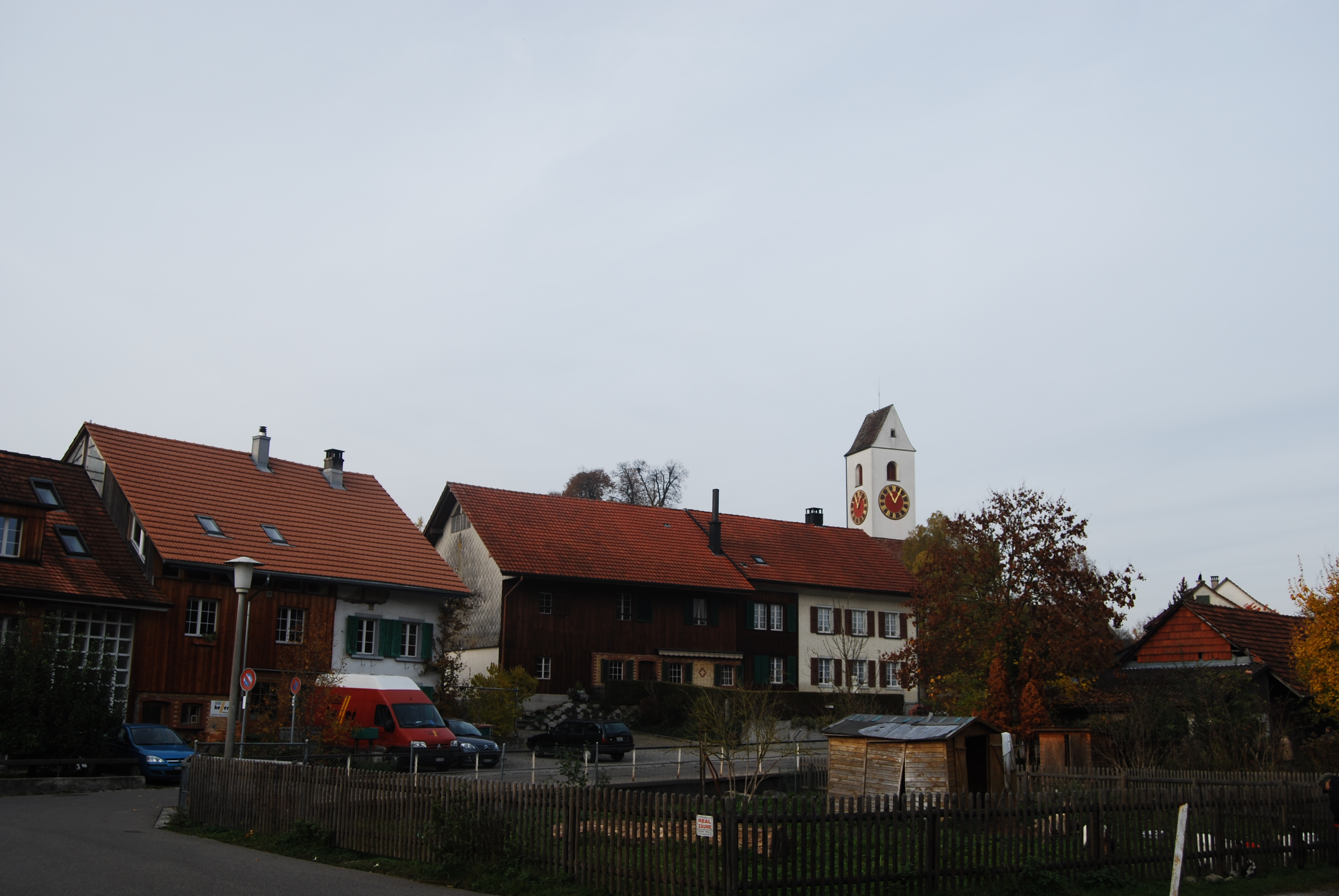

- Flag Coat of arms
- Location of Hettlingen
- Location within Switzerland Location within Canton of Zurich
- Coordinates: 47°33′N 8°43′E
- Country: Switzerland
- Canton: Zurich
- District: Winterthur

Area
  - Total: 5.87 km^{2} (2.27 sq mi)
- Elevation: 433 m (1,421 ft)

Population (December 2020)
  - Total: 3,101
  - Density: 528/km^{2} (1,370/sq mi)
- Time zone: UTC+01:00 (CET)
  - Summer (DST): UTC+02:00 (CEST)
- Postal code: 8442
- SFOS number: 221
- ISO 3166 code: CH-ZH
- Surrounded by: Dägerlen, Henggart, Neftenbach, Seuzach, Winterthur
- Website: www.hettlingen.ch

Hettlingen is a municipality in the district of Winterthur in the canton of Zürich in Switzerland.

== History ==
Aerial view from 200 m by Walter Mittelholzer (1931)

Hettlingen is first mentioned in 886 as Hetelinga.

== Geography ==
Hettlingen has an area of 5.8 km^{2} (2.2 sq mi). Of this area, 61.3% is used for agricultural purposes, while 21.8% is forested. Of the rest of the land, 16.1% is settled (buildings or roads) and the remainder (0.9%) is non-productive (rivers, glaciers or mountains). In 1996 housing and buildings made up 10.7% of the total area, while transportation infrastructure made up the rest (5.8%). Of the total unproductive area, water (streams and lakes) made up 0.2% of the area. As of 2007 13.8% of the total municipal area was undergoing some type of construction.

The municipality is located in the southern Zürcher Weinland.

== Demographics ==
Hettlingen has a population (as of 31 December 2020) of 3,101. As of 2007, 6.6% of the population was made up of foreign nationals. As of 2008 the gender distribution of the population was 48.6% male and 51.4% female. Over the last 10 years the population has grown at a rate of 41.9%. Most of the population (as of 2000) speaks German (94.7%), with French being second most common ( 1.0%) and English being third ( 0.9%).

In the 2007 election the most popular party was the SVP which received 39.1% of the vote. The next three most popular parties were the FDP (17.2%), the CSP (13.3%) and the SPS (13.2%).

The age distribution of the population (as of 2000) is children and teenagers (0–19 years old) make up 26.4% of the population, while adults (20–64 years old) make up 61.2% and seniors (over 64 years old) make up 12.3%. The entire Swiss population is generally well educated. In Hettlingen about 86.2% of the population (between age 25–64) have completed either non-mandatory upper secondary education or additional higher education (either university or a Fachhochschule). There are 922 households in Hettlingen.

Hettlingen has an unemployment rate of 1.07%. As of 2005, there were 70 people employed in the primary economic sector and about 26 businesses involved in this sector. 66 people are employed in the secondary sector and there are 20 businesses in this sector. 414 people are employed in the tertiary sector, with 56 businesses in this sector. As of 2007 35.2% of the working population were employed full-time, and 64.8% were employed part-time.

As of 2008 there were 618 Catholics and 1679 Protestants in Hettlingen. In the 2000 census, religion was broken down into several smaller categories. From the census, 64.5% were some type of Protestant, with 61% belonging to the Swiss Reformed Church and 3.5% belonging to other Protestant churches. 18.7% of the population were Catholic. Of the rest of the population, 0% were Muslim, 2.9% belonged to another religion (not listed), 2.6% did not give a religion, and 11.1% were atheist or agnostic.

The historical population is given in the following table:

year	population
1467	c205
1634	274
1836	493
1850	489
1900	462
1910	428
1950	597
1970	1,054
2000	2,383

== Transportation ==
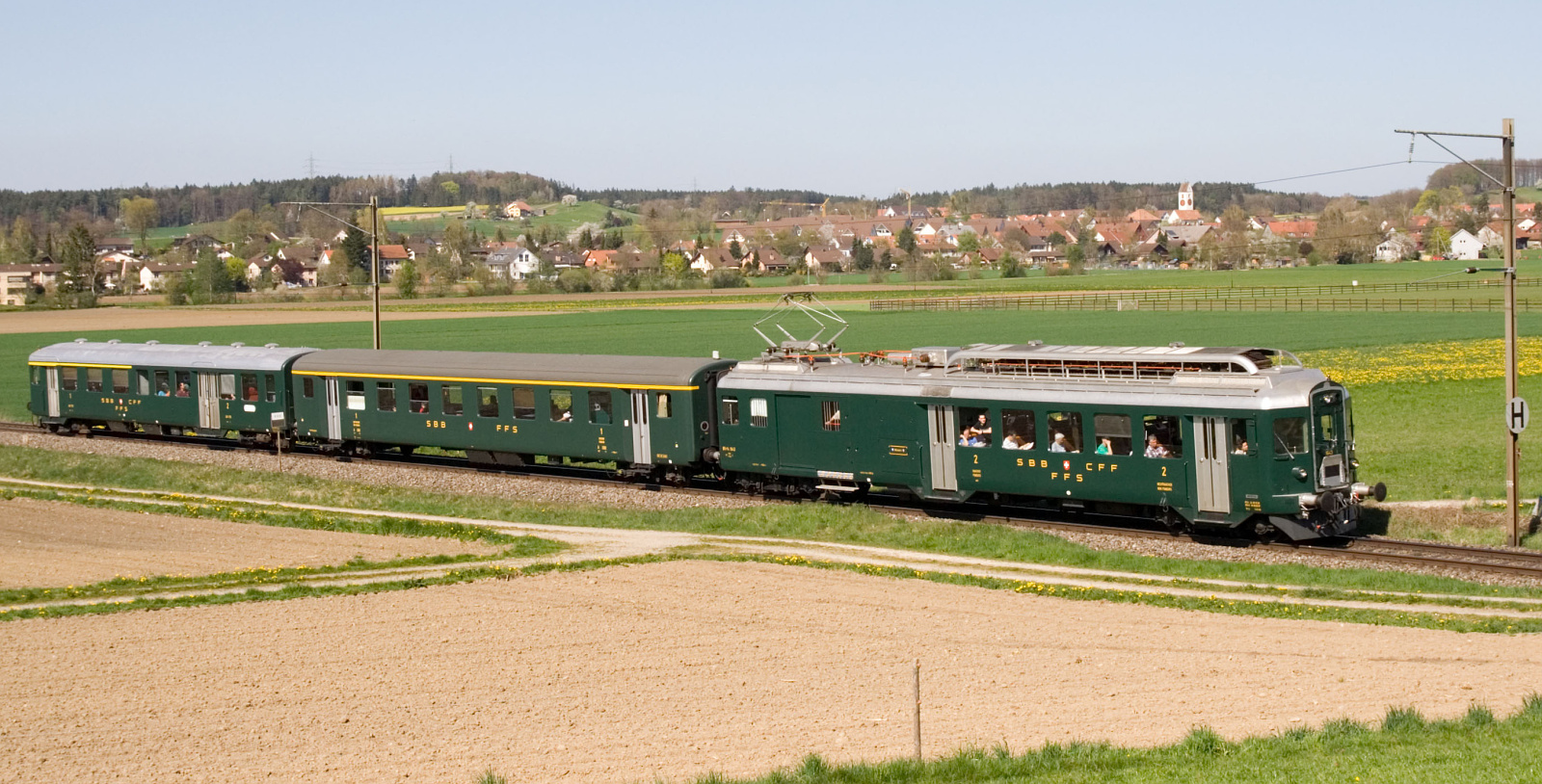
Historic SBB push-pull train consisting of BDe 4/4, A, ABt near Hettlingen

Hettlingen railway station is a stop of the S-Bahn Zürich on the line S33.
