= Dägerlen =

- Municipality
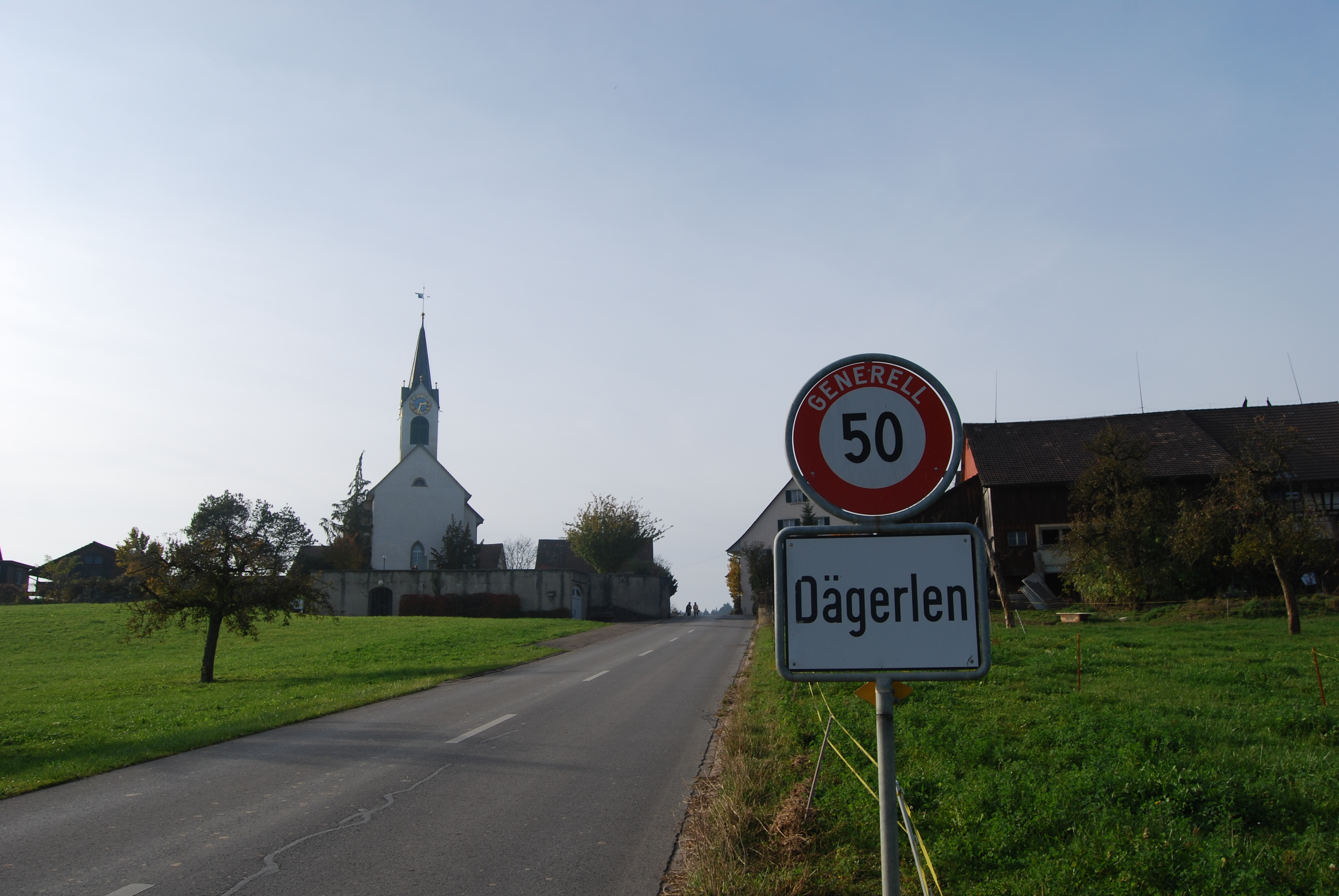

- Flag Coat of arms
- Location of Dägerlen
- Location within Switzerland Location within Canton of Zurich
- Coordinates: 47°34′N 8°43′E
- Country: Switzerland
- Canton: Zurich
- District: Winterthur

Area
  - Total: 7.90 km^{2} (3.05 sq mi)
- Elevation: 474 m (1,555 ft)

Population (December 2020)
  - Total: 1,037
  - Density: 131/km^{2} (340/sq mi)
- Time zone: UTC+01:00 (CET)
  - Summer (DST): UTC+02:00 (CEST)
- Postal code: 8471
- SFOS number: 214
- ISO 3166 code: CH-ZH
- Surrounded by: Adlikon, Dinhard, Henggart, Hettlingen, Humlikon, Seuzach, Thalheim an der Thur
- Website: www.daegerlen.ch

Dägerlen is a municipality in the district of Winterthur in the canton of Zürich in Switzerland.

== History ==
Aerial view from 200 m by Walter Mittelholzer (1923)

Dägerlen is first mentioned in the 14th century as Tegerlo. During the 13th century, Rutschwil (first mentioned in 1219 as Ruoltswilare) was the fief of a Kyburg. It was held by a ministerialis or unfree knight in service of the Counts of Kyburg. They held extensive properties in what would become the municipality of Dägerlen. In 1264, when the Kyburg family died out, it came under the authority of the Habsburgs.

== Geography ==
Dägerlen has an area of 8 km^{2} (3.1 sq mi). Of this area, 66.9% is used for agricultural purposes, 25.2% is forested, 7.4% is settled (buildings or roads) and the remainder (0.5%) is non-productive (rivers, glaciers or mountains). In 1996 housing and buildings made up 4.4% of the total area, while transportation infrastructure made up 2.9%. Water (streams and lakes) made up 0.4% of the total area. As of 2007 4% of the total municipal area was undergoing some type of construction.

The municipality is located on the edge of the Zürcher Weinland south of the Thur river. It includes the settlements of Dägerlen, Oberwil, Rutschwil, Berg and Bänk.

== Demographics ==
Dägerlen has a population (as of 31 December 2020) of 1,037. As of 2007, 7.8% of the population was made up of foreign nationals. As of 2008 the gender distribution of the population was 51.5% male and 48.5% female. Over the last 10 years the population has grown at a rate of 21.2%. Most of the population (as of 2000) speaks German (95.7%), with Albanian being second most common ( 2.2%) and Italian being third ( 0.6%).

In the 2007 election the most popular party was the SVP which received 51.4% of the vote. The next three most popular parties were the CSP (15.5%), the SPS (12.6%) and the Green Party (9.4%).

The age distribution of the population (as of 2000) is children and teenagers (0–19 years old) make up 30.3% of the population, while adults (20–64 years old) make up 59.3% and seniors (over 64 years old) make up 10.5%. The entire Swiss population is generally well educated. In Dägerlen about 81.9% of the population (between age 25 and 64) have completed either non-mandatory upper secondary education or additional higher education (either University or a Fachhochschule). There are 301 households in Dägerlen.

Dägerlen has an unemployment rate of 1.18%. As of 2005, 78 people were employed in the primary economic sector and about 32 businesses involved in this sector; 85 people were employed in the secondary sector and there are 12 businesses in this sector; 60 people were employed in the tertiary sector, with 19 businesses in this sector. As of 2007 41% of the working population were employed full-time, and 59% were employed part-time.

As of 2008 there were 133 Catholics and 643 Protestants in Dägerlen. In the 2000 census, religion was broken down into several smaller categories. From the census, 73.6% were some type of Protestant, with 70.1% belonging to the Swiss Reformed Church and 3.5% belonging to other Protestant churches and 12.1% of the population were Catholic. Of the rest of the population, 0% were Muslim, 3.7% belonged to another religion (not listed), 1.3% did not give a religion, and 9.3% were atheist or agnostic.

The historical population is given in the following table:

year	population
1467	c140
1634	314
1771	398
1850	524
1860	560
1880	441
1900	507
1950	476
1970	508
2000	859
