= August Friedrich Oelenhainz =

German painter

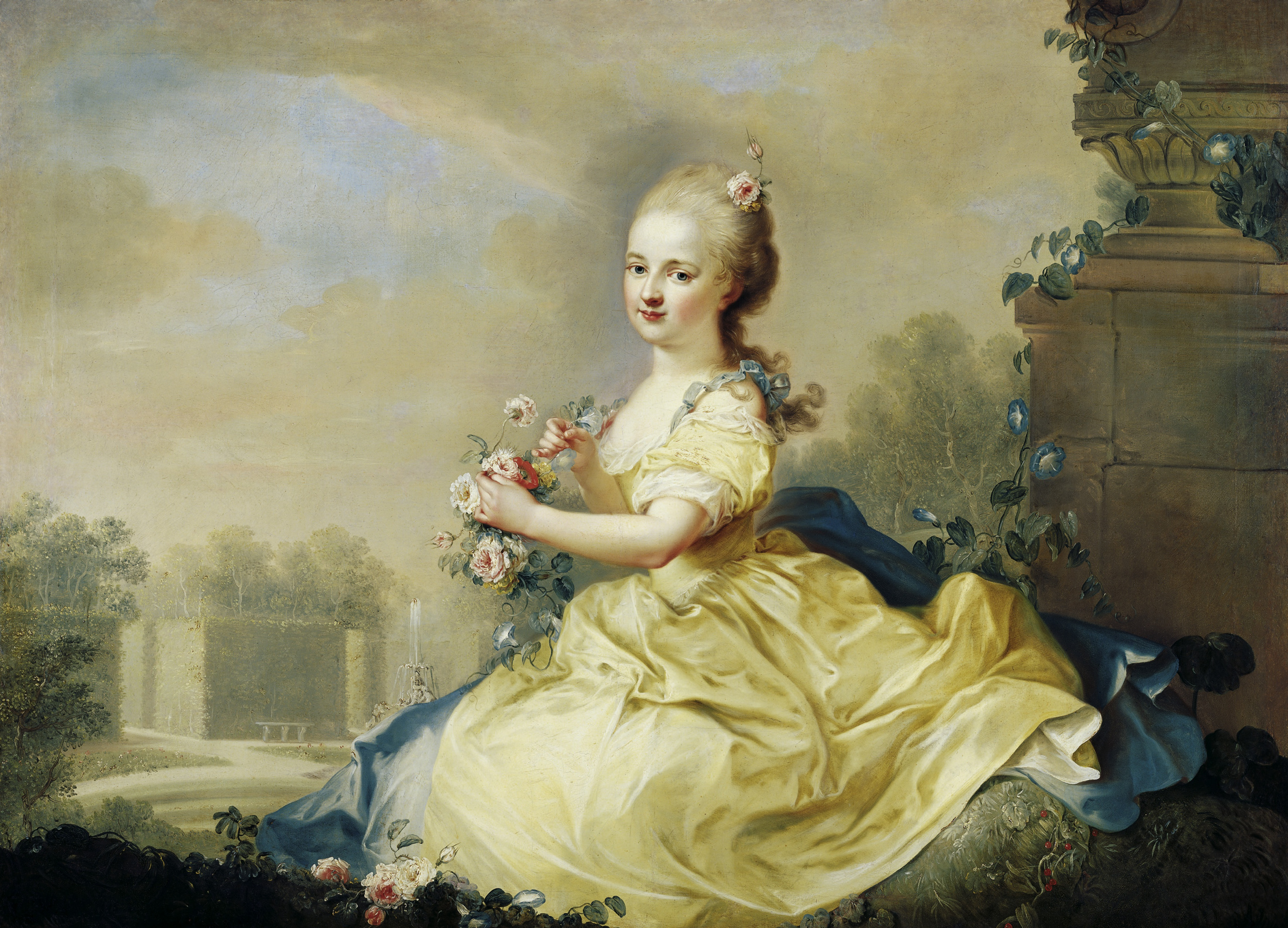
Portrait of Maria Josepha Hermengilde von Liechtenstein by August Friedrich Oelenhainz

August Friedrich Oelenhainz (June 28, 1745 – November 5, 1804) was a German painter.

== Biography ==
Oelenhainz's father was a preacher. He studied under his uncle Wolfgang Dietrich Mayr in Tübingen, and then later at the art school in Stuttgart with the Württemberg court painter Johann Wilhelm Beyer. In 1766 he studied at the Academy of Fine Arts Vienna. Oelenhainz moved to Vienna, where in the imperial court he rapidly became a popular painter. He primarily painted portraits. From 1790 he worked in 1792 in Zurich and Bern. From 1800 he lived in 1801 in Stuttgart and Ulm. In 1803 he traveled to Paris and on the way home died unexpectedly in 1804. Oelenhainz was never married.

The painter Susette Hirzel studied briefly with Oelenhainz.

== Sources ==
- Albert Ilg, Julius Hartmann: Oelenhainz, August Friedrich. In: Allgemeine Deutsche Biographie (ADB). Band 24. Duncker & Humblot, Leipzig 1887, p. 284ff.
