= Greifensee Reformed Church =

Church in Zurich, Switzerland

Gallus-Kapelle
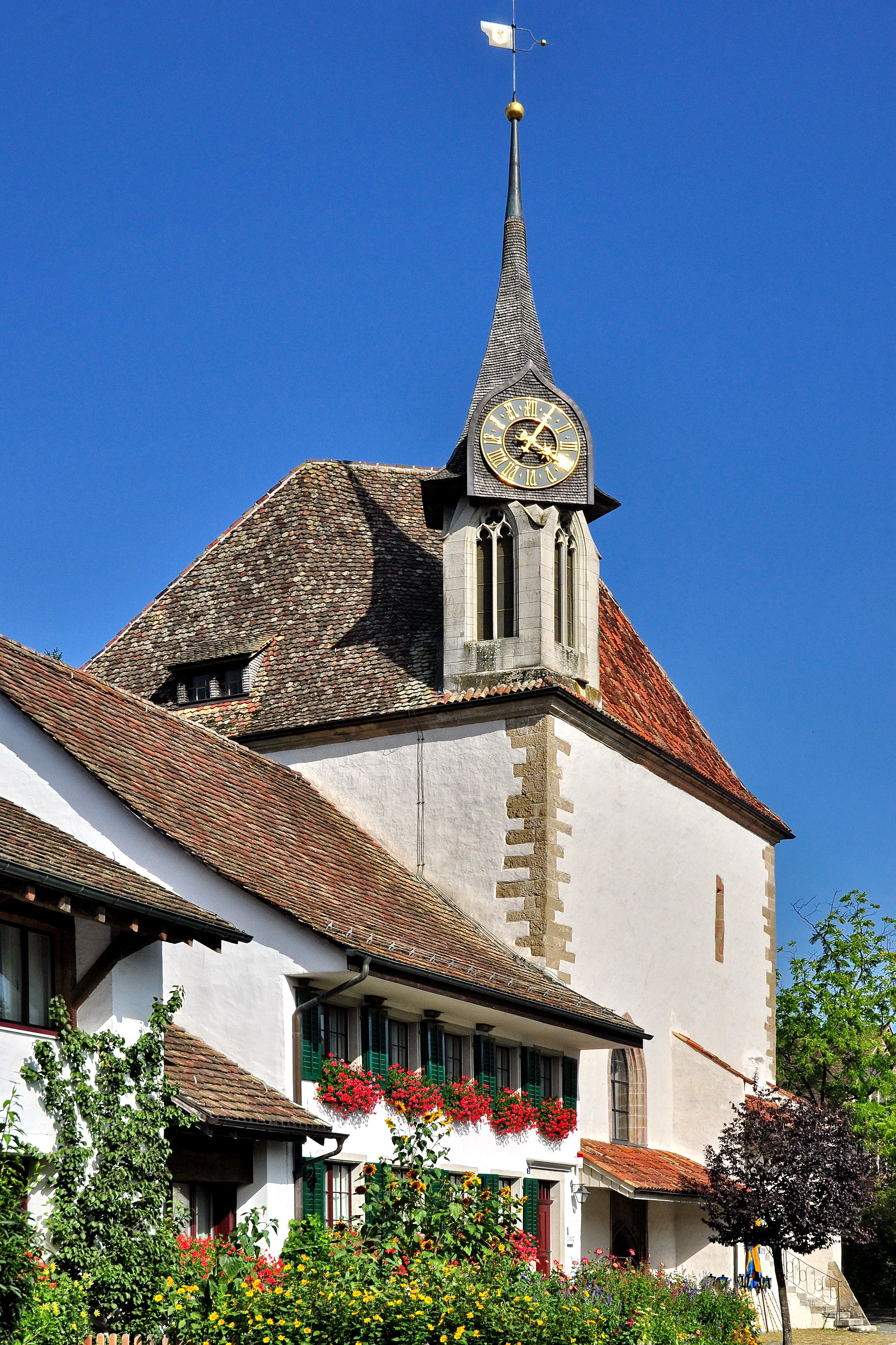

Religion
- Affiliation: Reformed
- District: Evangelical Reformed Church of the Canton of Zürich

Location
- Location: Greifensee, Canton of Zürich; Switzerland
- Interactive map of Gallus-Kapelle
- Coordinates: 47°21′54″N 8°40′37″E

Architecture
- Type: Church
- Style: Gothic fortified church
- Completed: around 1340 AD

Website
- Official website (in German)

Reformierte Kirche Greifensee (native German name, literally: Greifensee Reformed Church or commonly Gallus-Kapelle Im Städtli), is a church and a listed heritage building in the municipality of Greifensee, Canton of Zürich, Switzerland.

== Architecture ==
The triangular building is considered to be the oldest intact Gothic monument of the medieval town of Greifensee. Originally, it was integrated into the eastern corner of the city walls as a Wehrkirche, a fortified church, repeating in its ground floor the plan of the small town. The Gothic building got its unusual floor plan due to the inclusion in the town walls of Greifensee. The facade is dominated by a clock tower with pinnacles. The interior has a single central pillar, which unfolds to a stellar vault with magnificent keystones. The wooden gallery dates back to 1638, the baptismal font is from 1603, and the pulpit in rococo style dates from 1780. On the inner walls Bible verses are painted.

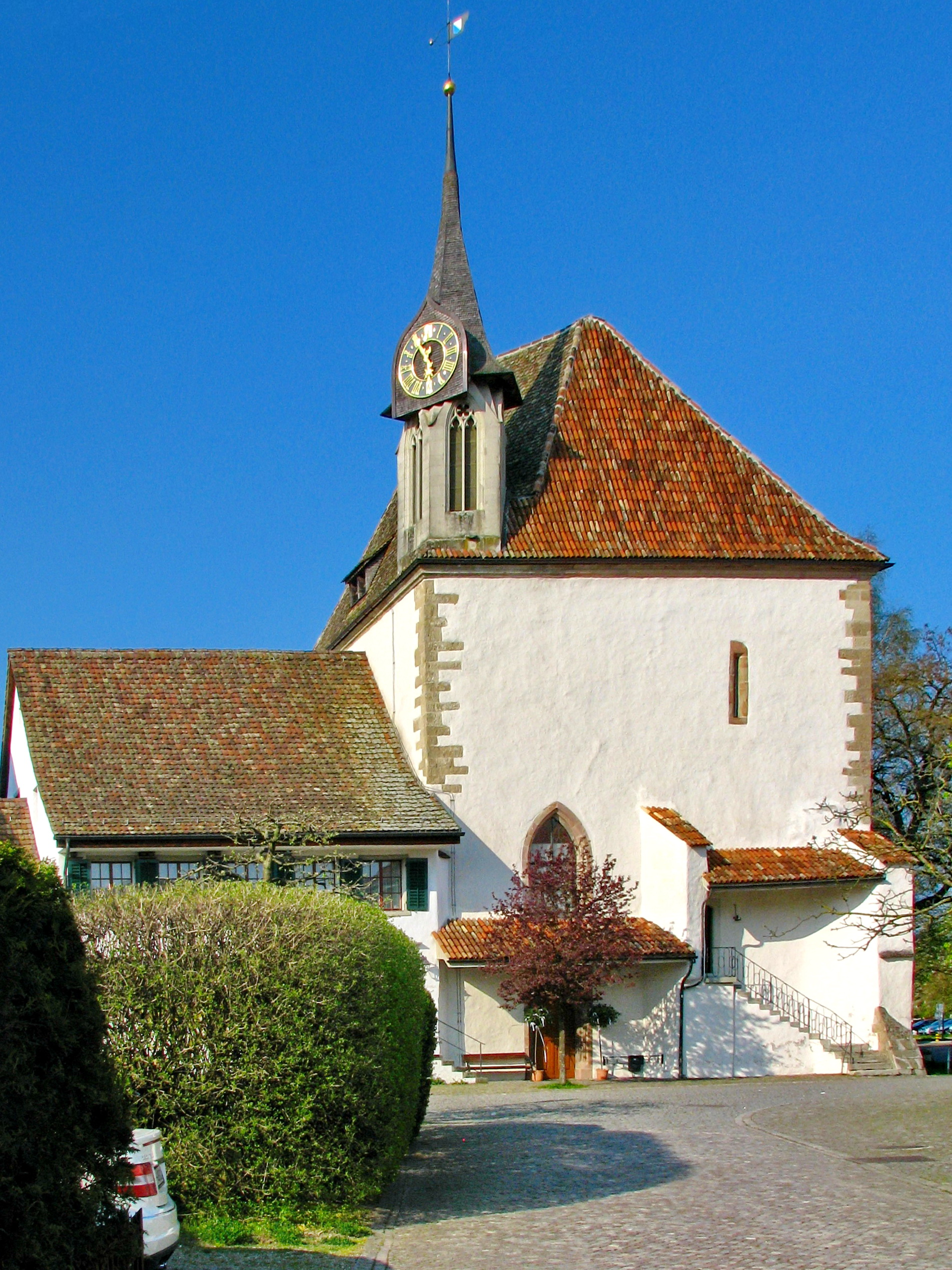
Gallus-Kapelle and the town hall of Greifensee

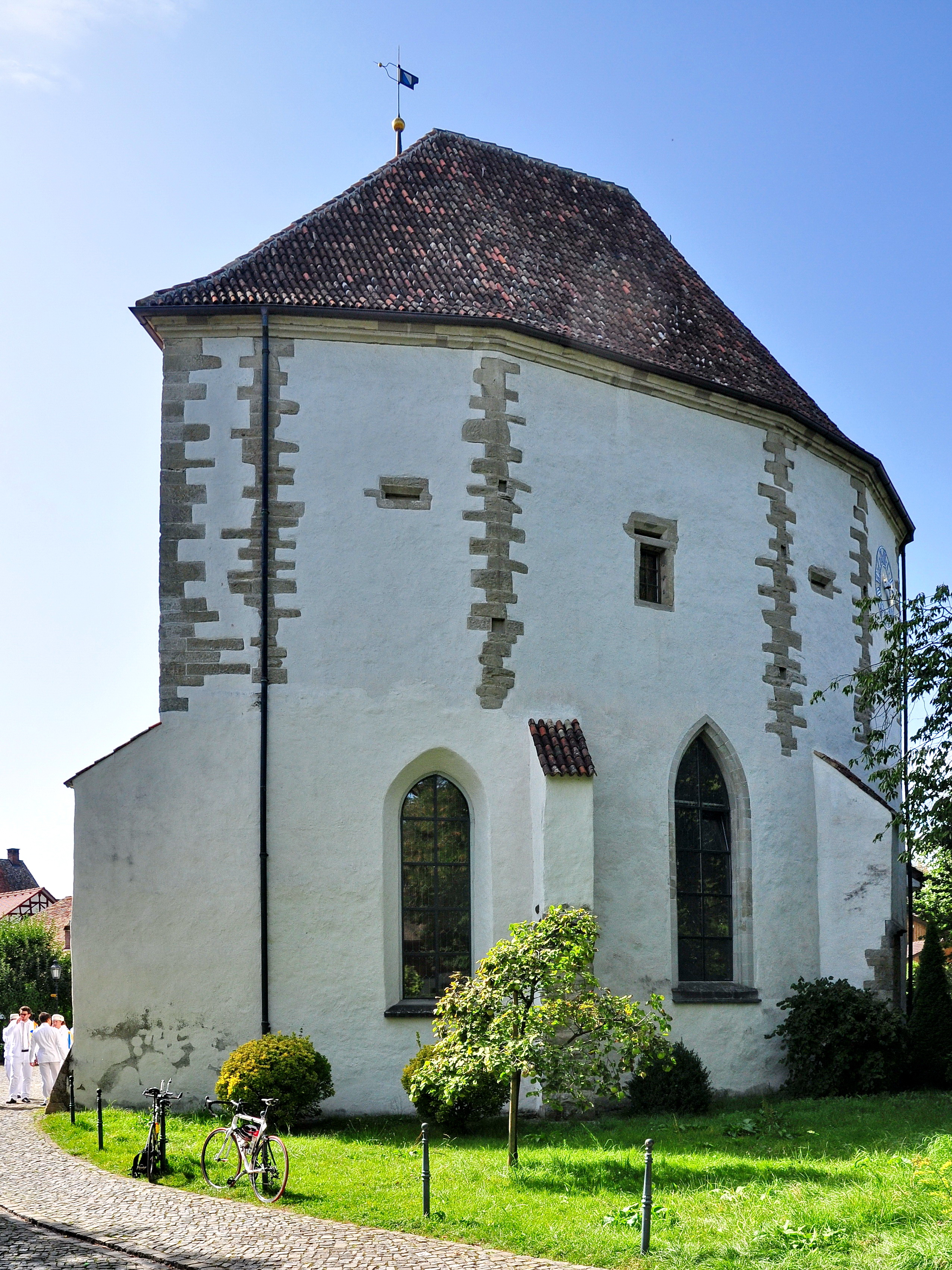
View from outside of the town wall

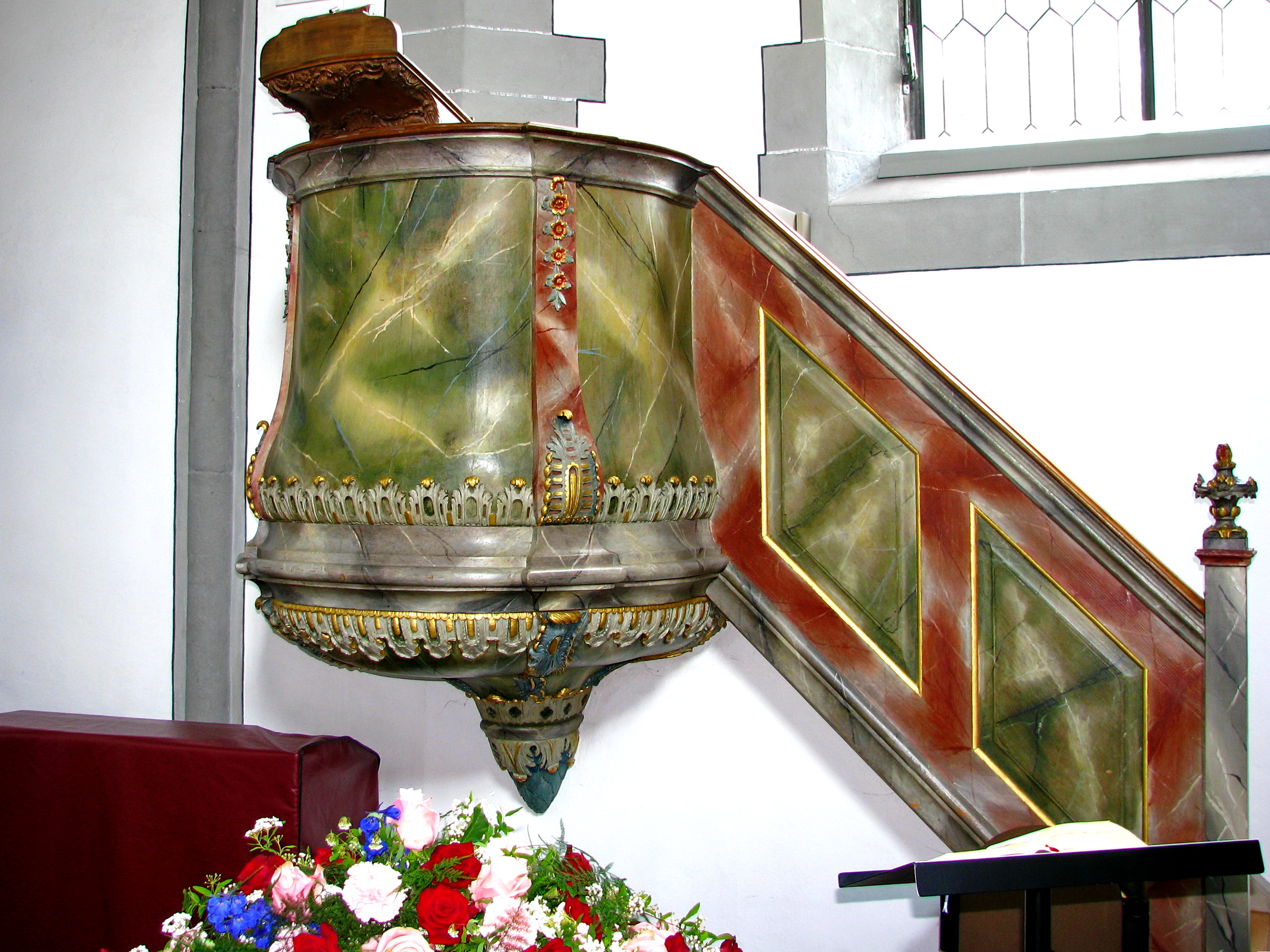
Pulpit inside the church

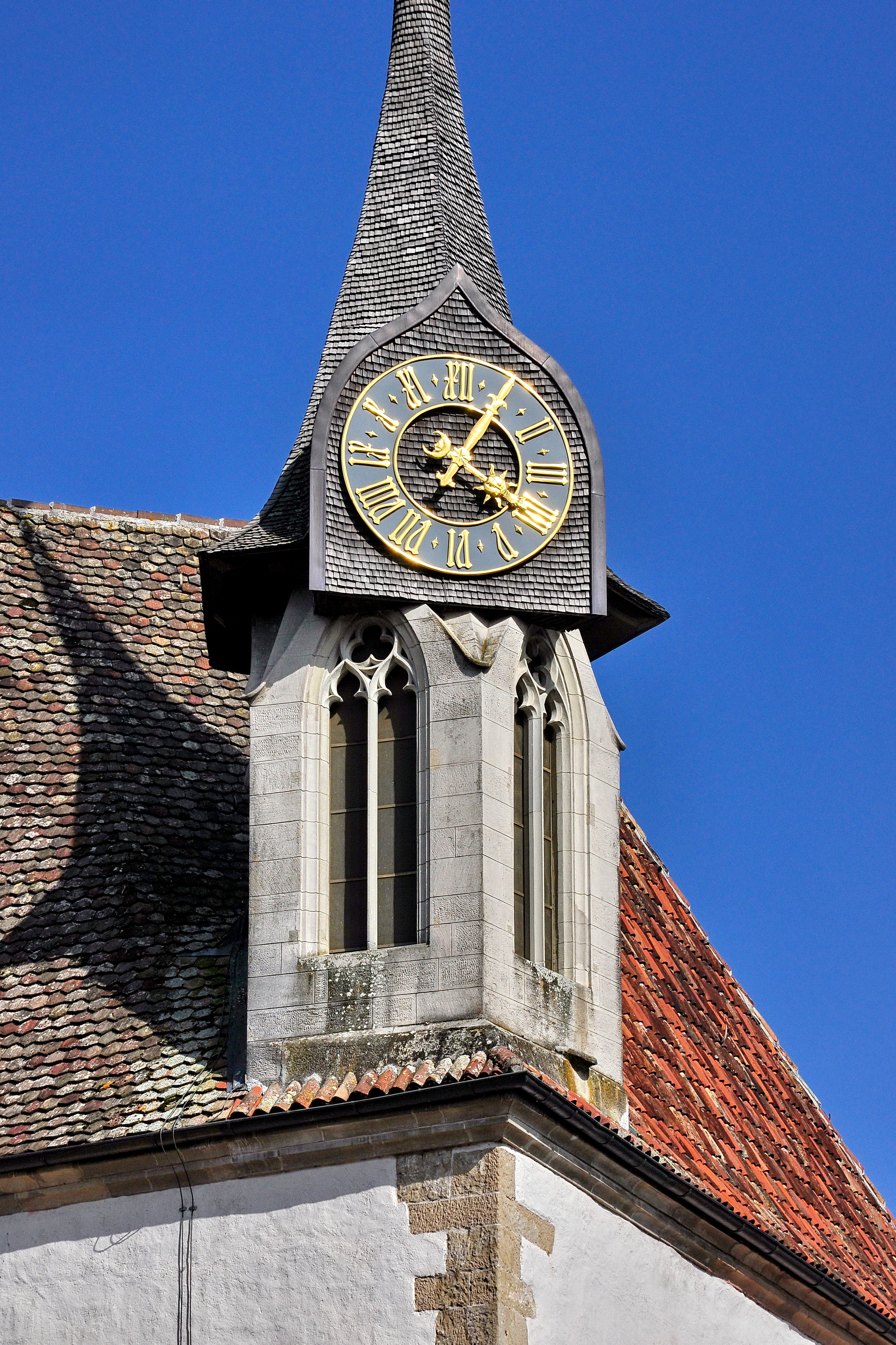
Ridge tower

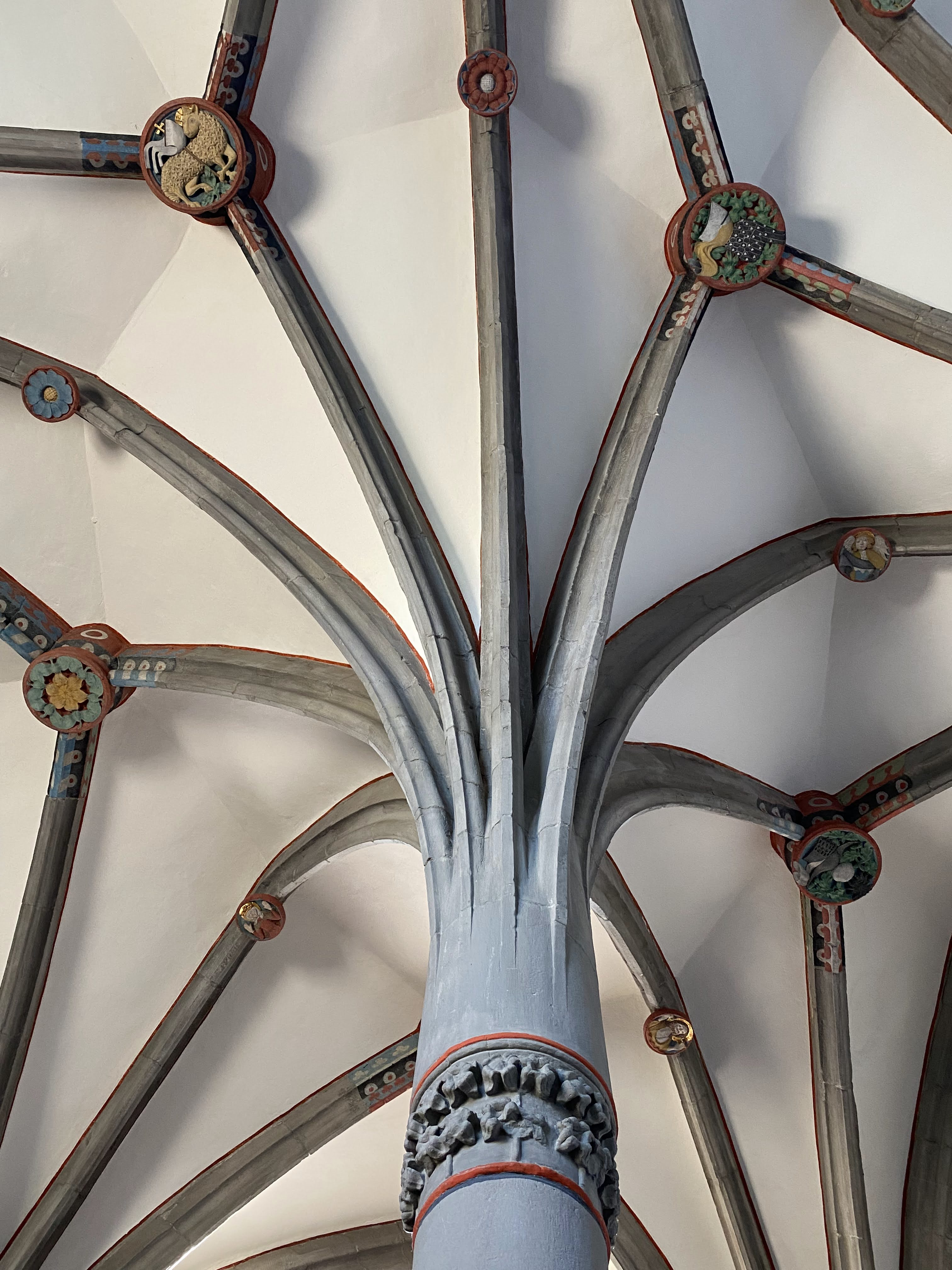
Peripheral keystones at the ceiling

== History ==
Nobleman Hermann IV (the younger Marschal) von Landenberg donated, for his salvation and on his wife Elisabeth von Schellenberg favour, the fortified chapel around 1330–1340. The year book (Jahrzeitbuch) of the Uster church lists donations by the Landenberg family in favor of the Uster church, as well as the foundation of the chapel in Greifensee and the foundation of the Greifensee castle chapel around 1350. The castle chapel is dedicated to St Catherine, and also was given by Hermann IV. For centuries, the tiny Gallus chapel has been the Parish church of the medieval town of Greifensee. The church is associated to the Reformed Church of the canton of Zürich and also is popular for weddings.

== Cultural Heritage ==
The small building is listed as Reformierte Kirche, Im Städtli in the Swiss inventory of cultural property of national and regional significance as a Class A object of national importance.
