= Humlikon =

- Former municipality
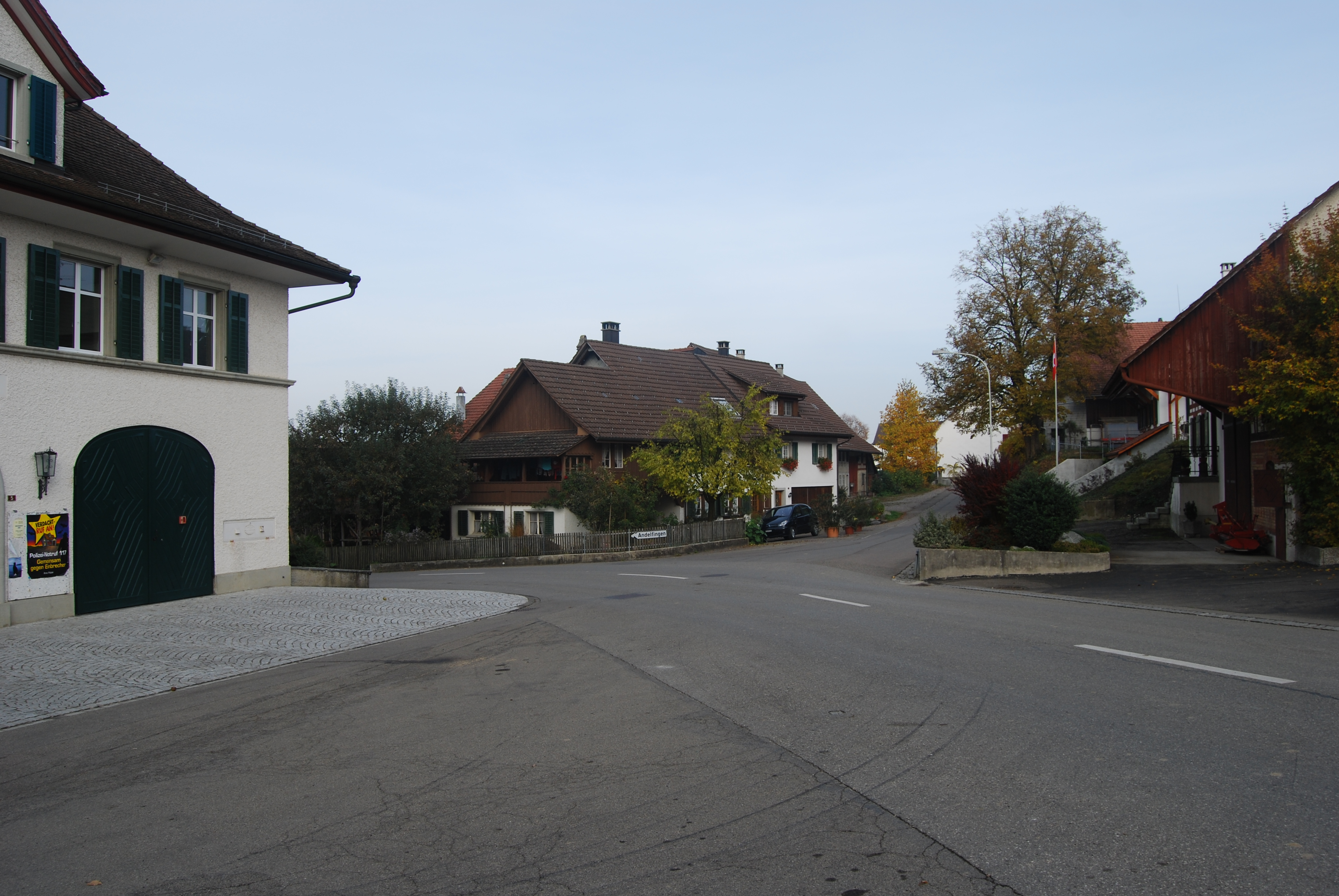

- Flag Coat of arms
- Location of Humlikon
- Location within Switzerland Location within Canton of Zurich
- Coordinates: 47°35′N 8°40′E
- Country: Switzerland
- Canton: Zurich
- District: Andelfingen

Area
  - Total: 3.70 km^{2} (1.43 sq mi)
- Elevation: 420 m (1,380 ft)

Population (December 2020)
  - Total: 484
  - Density: 131/km^{2} (339/sq mi)
- Time zone: UTC+01:00 (CET)
  - Summer (DST): UTC+02:00 (CEST)
- Postal code: 8457
- SFOS number: 32
- ISO 3166 code: CH-ZH
- Surrounded by: Adlikon, Andelfingen, Dägerlen, Dorf, Henggart, Neftenbach
- Website: www.humlikon.ch

Humlikon is a former municipality in the district of Andelfingen in the canton of Zürich in Switzerland. On 1 January 2023 the former municipalities of Adlikon and Humlikon merged to form the municipality of Andelfingen. 43 residents were killed in the crash of Swissair Flight 306.

== History ==
Humlikon is first mentioned in 1228 as Humlincon.

Aerial view (1953)

== Geography ==
Humlikon has an area of 3.7 km^{2} (1.4 sq mi). Of this area, 63.6% is used for agricultural purposes, while 28.3% is forested. The rest of the land, (8.2%) is settled.

The municipality is located south of the Thur river in the Zürcher Weinland.

== Swissair Flight 306 ==
On 4 September 1963, 43 people from Humlikon went to visit an agricultural test site near Geneva on Swissair Flight 306. When the flight crashed shortly after take off, the village lost one fifth of its 217 inhabitants, including all members of the municipal council, all the school caretakers and the post office clerk.

39 children were orphaned by the crash. However, because most households still had grandparents or elder siblings, only six children had to leave their homes, all but one of whom were raised by relatives in other villages.

On October 26 and 27, the new municipal council was elected by the remaining 52 inhabitants entitled to vote; it was not easy to fill all vacancies.

== Demographics ==
Humlikon has a population (as of 31 December 2020) of 484. As of 2007, 4.8% of the population was made up of foreign nationals. Over the past 10 years (2000–2010), the population has grown at a rate of 10.7%. Most of the population (as of 2000) speaks German (94.1%), with French being second most common (1.5%) and Serbo-Croatian being third (1.0%).

In the 2007 election, the most popular party was the SVP which received 53.6% of the vote. The next three most popular parties were the CSP (9.4%), the SPS (9%) and the FDP (8.5%).

The age distribution of the population (as of 2000) is children and teenagers (0–19 years old) make up 26.2% of the population, while adults (20–64 years old) make up 63.2% and seniors (over 64 years old) make up 10.5%. The entire Swiss population is generally well educated. In Humlikon about 85.9% of the population (between age 25-64) have completed either non-mandatory upper secondary education or additional higher education (either university or a Fachhochschule).

Humlikon has an unemployment rate of 2.24%. As of 2005, there were 27 people employed in the primary economic sector and about 12 businesses involved in this sector. Four people are employed in the secondary sector and there are 2 businesses in this sector. 88 people are employed in the tertiary sector, with 13 businesses in this sector. The historical population is given in the following table:

Year	Population
1467	ca.60
1634	178
1850	346
1880	320
1900	263
1950	213
2000	408
2018	487
