= Adlikon bei Andelfingen =

- Former municipality
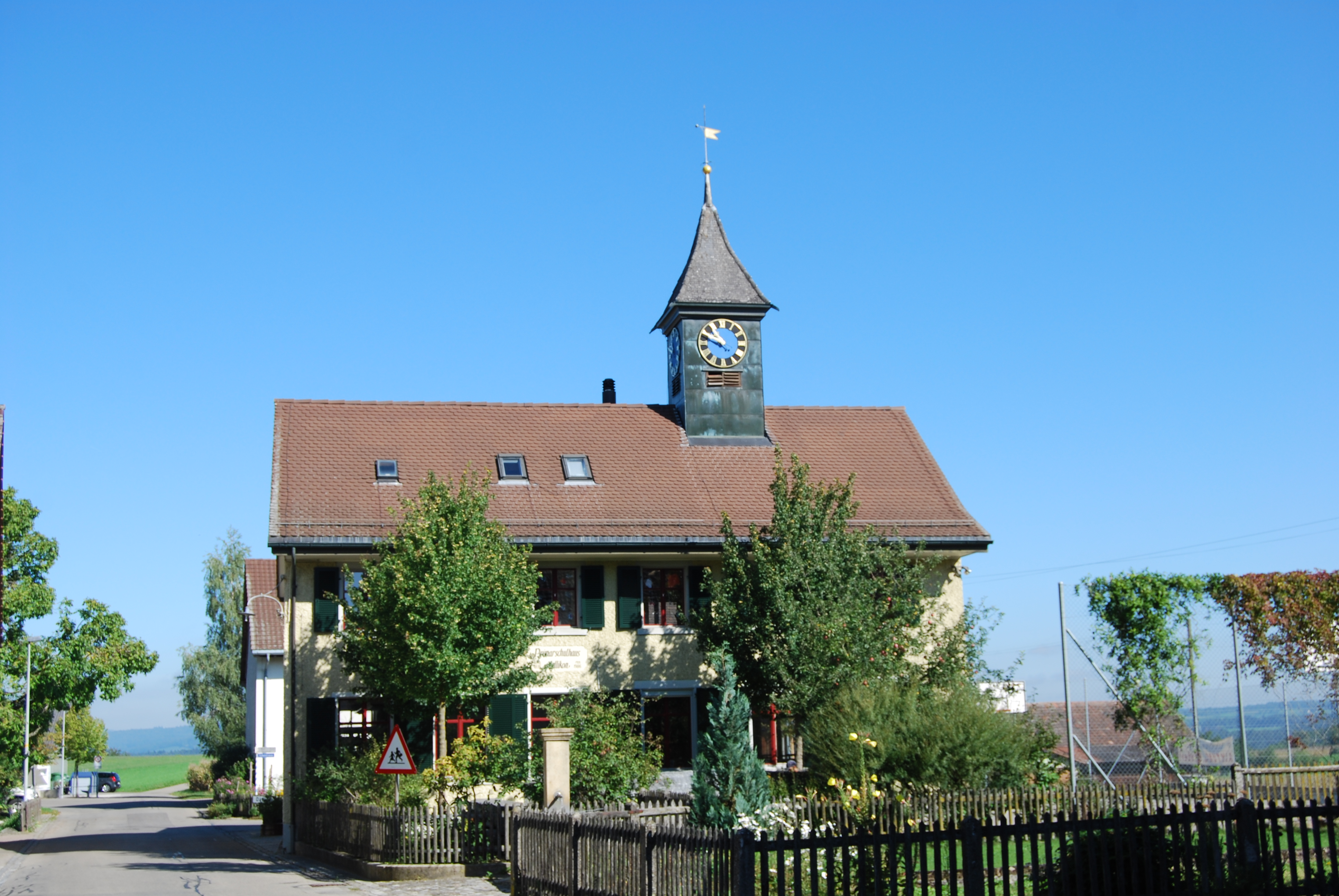

- Flag Coat of arms
- Location of Adlikon bei Andelfingen
- Location within Switzerland Location within Canton of Zurich
- Coordinates: 47°35′N 8°42′E
- Country: Switzerland
- Canton: Zurich
- District: Andelfingen

Area
  - Total: 6.71 km^{2} (2.59 sq mi)
- Elevation: 448 m (1,470 ft)

Population (December 2020)
  - Total: 693
  - Density: 103/km^{2} (267/sq mi)
- Time zone: UTC+01:00 (CET)
  - Summer (DST): UTC+02:00 (CEST)
- Postal code: 8452
- SFOS number: 21
- ISO 3166 code: CH-ZH
- Surrounded by: Andelfingen, Dägerlen, Humlikon, Ossingen, Thalheim an der Thur
- Website: www.adlikon.ch

Adlikon bei Andelfingen (or simply Adlikon) is a former municipality in the district of Andelfingen in the canton of Zürich in Switzerland. On 1 January 2023 the former municipalities of Adlikon and Humlikon merged to form the municipality of Andelfingen.

== History ==
Adlikon is first mentioned in 1255 as Adilinkon.

== Geography ==
Aerial view (1946)

Adlikon has an area of 6.6 km^{2} (2.5 sq mi). Of this area, 66% is used for agricultural purposes, while 23% is forested. Of the rest of the land, 8.6% is settled (buildings or roads) and the remainder (2.4%) is non-productive (rivers, glaciers or mountains).

The municipality is located south of the Thur river. It includes the hamlets of Dätwil und Niederwil.

== Demographics ==
Adlikon has a population (as of 31 December 2020) of 693. As of 2007, 3.5% of the population was made up of foreign nationals. Over the last 10 years the population has grown at a rate of 1.2%. Most of the population (as of 2000) speaks German (98.1%), with Albanian being second most common ( 1.0%) and English being third ( 0.3%).

In the 2007 election the most popular party was the SVP which received 53% of the vote. The next three most popular parties were the CSP (9.9%), the Green Party (9.7%) and the SPS (8.6%).

The age distribution of the population (as of 2000) is children and teenagers (0–19 years old) make up 29.5% of the population, while adults (20–64 years old) make up 59.3% and seniors (over 64 years old) make up 11.2%. In Adlikon about 85.6% of the population (between age 25-64) have completed either non-mandatory upper secondary education or additional higher education (either university or a Fachhochschule).

Adlikon has an unemployment rate of 1.62%. As of 2005, there were 66 people employed in the primary economic sector and about 27 businesses involved in this sector. 20 people are employed in the secondary sector and there are 5 businesses in this sector. 120 people are employed in the tertiary sector, with 13 businesses in this sector. The historical population is given in the following table:

year	population
1467	46 adults
1470	27
1634	253
1850	569^{a}
1900	432
1950	394
2000	587

^a In 1872 Humlikon separated from Adlikon, 1850 numbers are without Humlikon.
