= Johann Martin Usteri =

Swiss poet

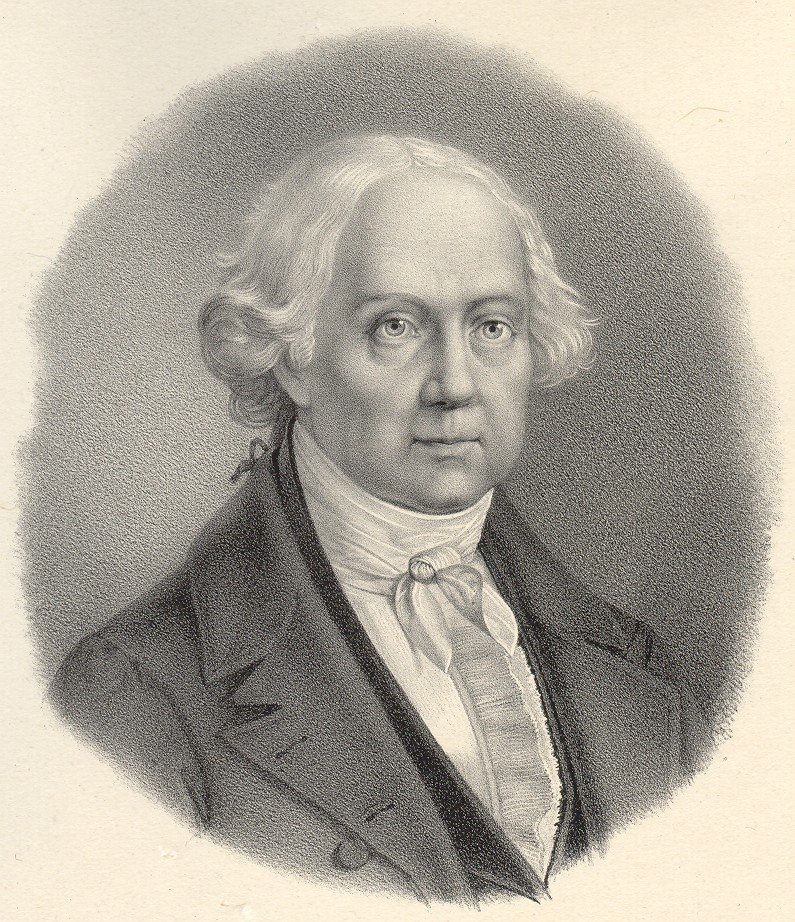
Johann Martin Usteri (c.1800)

Johann Martin Usteri (14 February 1763 in Zürich – 29 July 1827, Rapperswil) was a Swiss poet, noted for his narrative poetry and his idylls. He was one of the earliest poets to write poems in Swiss German, specifically in his native Zürich dialect; among these, his Vicar holds the foremost place.
