= Greifensee, Zürich =

Greifensee
- Municipality
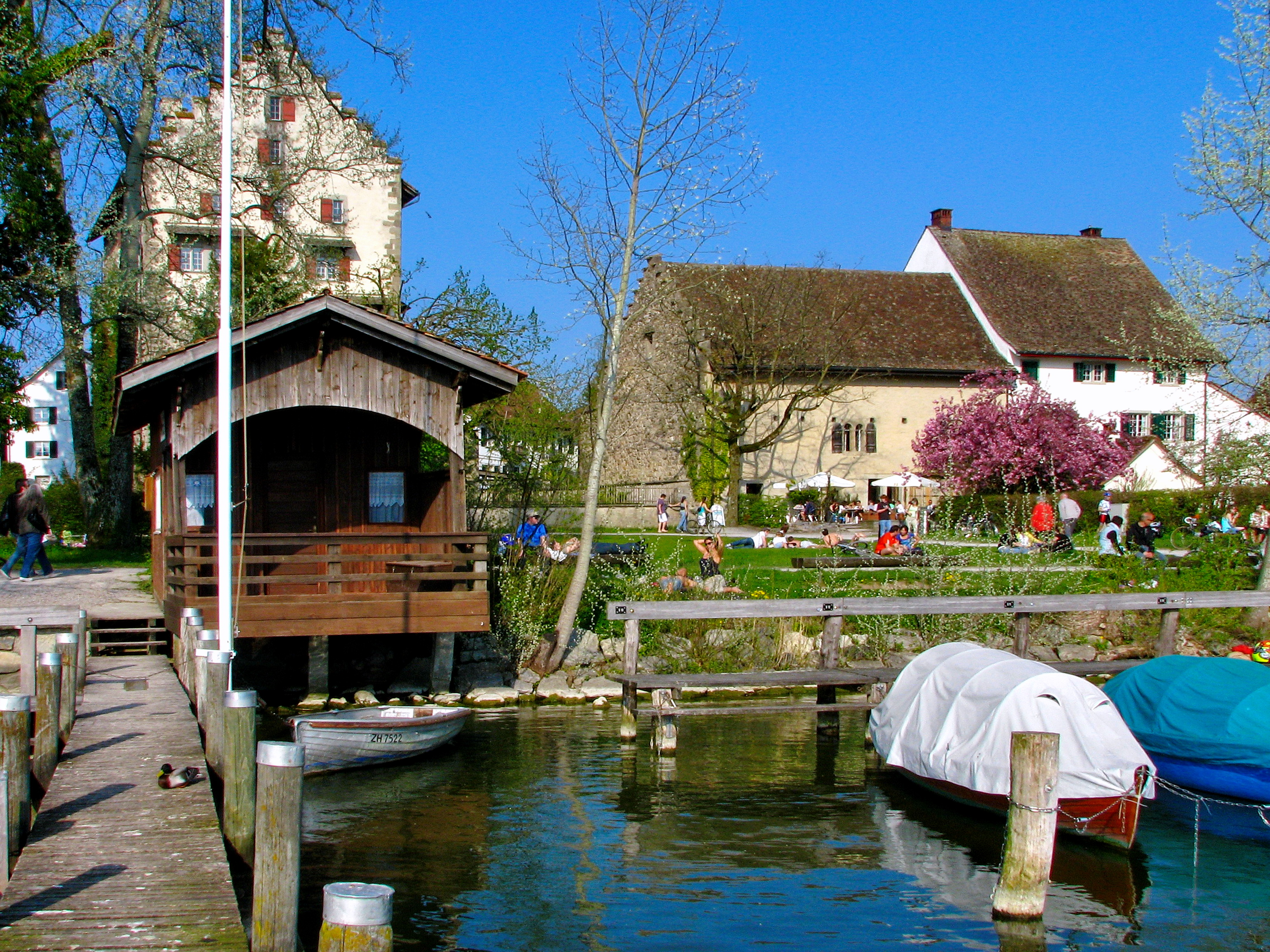

- Flag Coat of arms
- Location of Greifensee
- Location within Switzerland Location within Canton of Zürich
- Coordinates: 47°22′N 8°41′E
- Country: Switzerland
- Canton: Zürich
- District: Uster

Area
  - Total: 2.30 km^{2} (0.89 sq mi)
- Elevation: 439 m (1,440 ft)

Population (December 2020)
  - Total: 5,307
  - Density: 2,310/km^{2} (5,980/sq mi)
- Time zone: UTC+01:00 (CET)
  - Summer (DST): UTC+02:00 (CEST)
- Postal code: 8606
- SFOS number: 194
- ISO 3166 code: CH-ZH
- Surrounded by: Fällanden, Maur, Schwerzenbach, Uster, Volketswil
- Website: www.greifensee.ch

Greifensee (Swiss Standard German pronunciation: [ˈɡraɪfn̩ˌseː]) is a municipality in the district of Uster in the Canton of Zurich in Switzerland.

== History ==
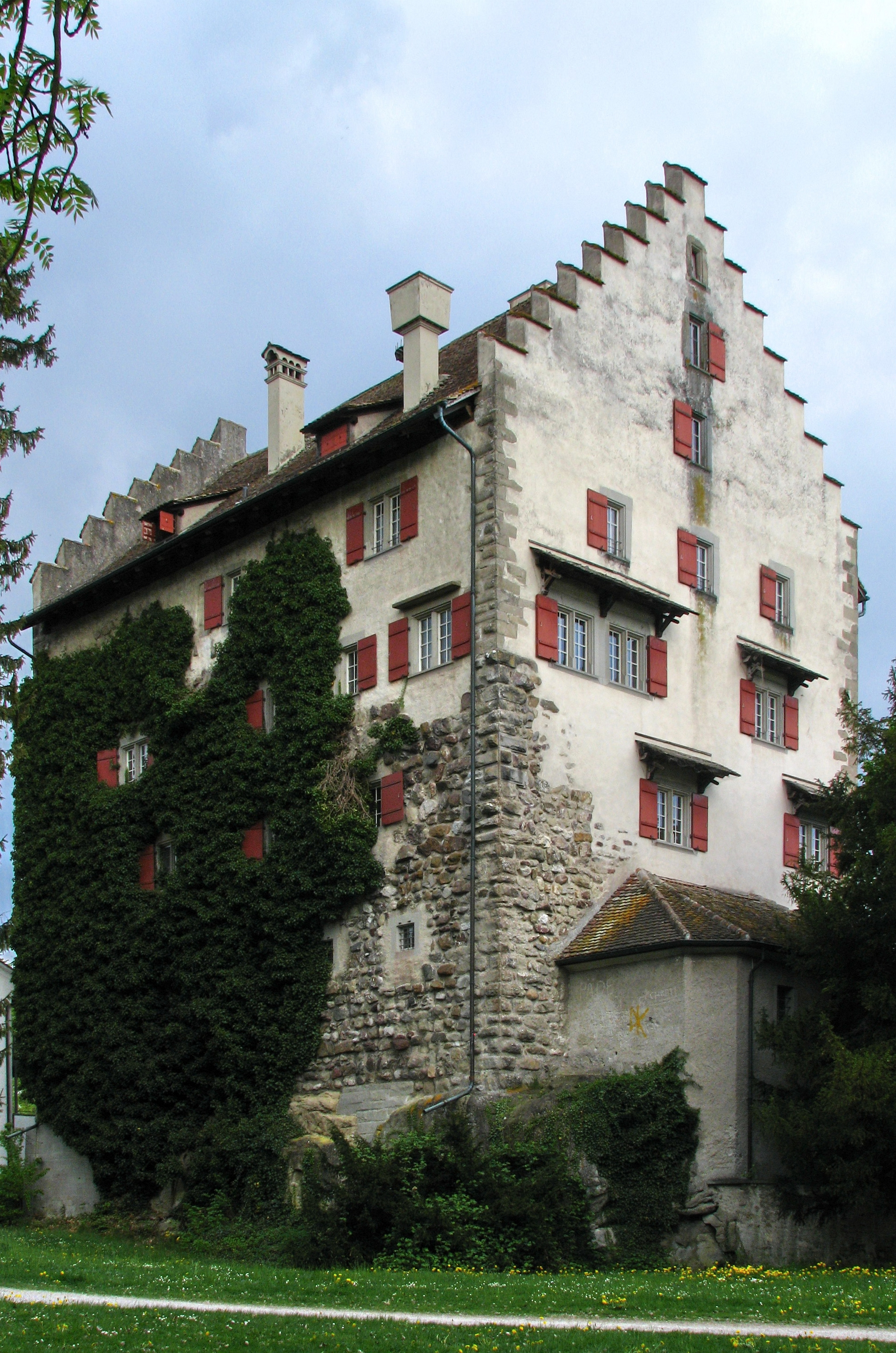
Castle of Greifensee

=== Early history ===
Settlements in Greifensee date back in 4000 B.C. In 1975, a Neolithic stilt house village located on the northern shore of the Lake Greifen area called Böschen was discovered by recreational divers. Initially, they found ceramics, lavishly decorated pots and bowls, and simple, large food tanks. In scientific dives, the remains of a village with 24 huts have been revealed. The excellent condition of the timber relicts allows dendrochronological dating to the year 1051 B.C. Weaving spindles made of clay, tools, needles and fishing hooks from bronze, charred wild apples and cereals have been conserved. Ten years after its construction, the settlement was destroyed by a fire and not rebuilt. For the subsequent years, in the canton of Zürich various archaeological relicts have been found, such as heavy bronze bracelets, glass, mainly bronze fibulas and flint blades probably from the Mediterranean and France. Relicts dating to the Roman period have been found in neighbouring municipalities, in Riedikon (Uster), and about nine kilometers away near Pfäffikon ZH located at Lake Pfäffikon (Irgenhausen Castrum).

=== Middle Ages ===
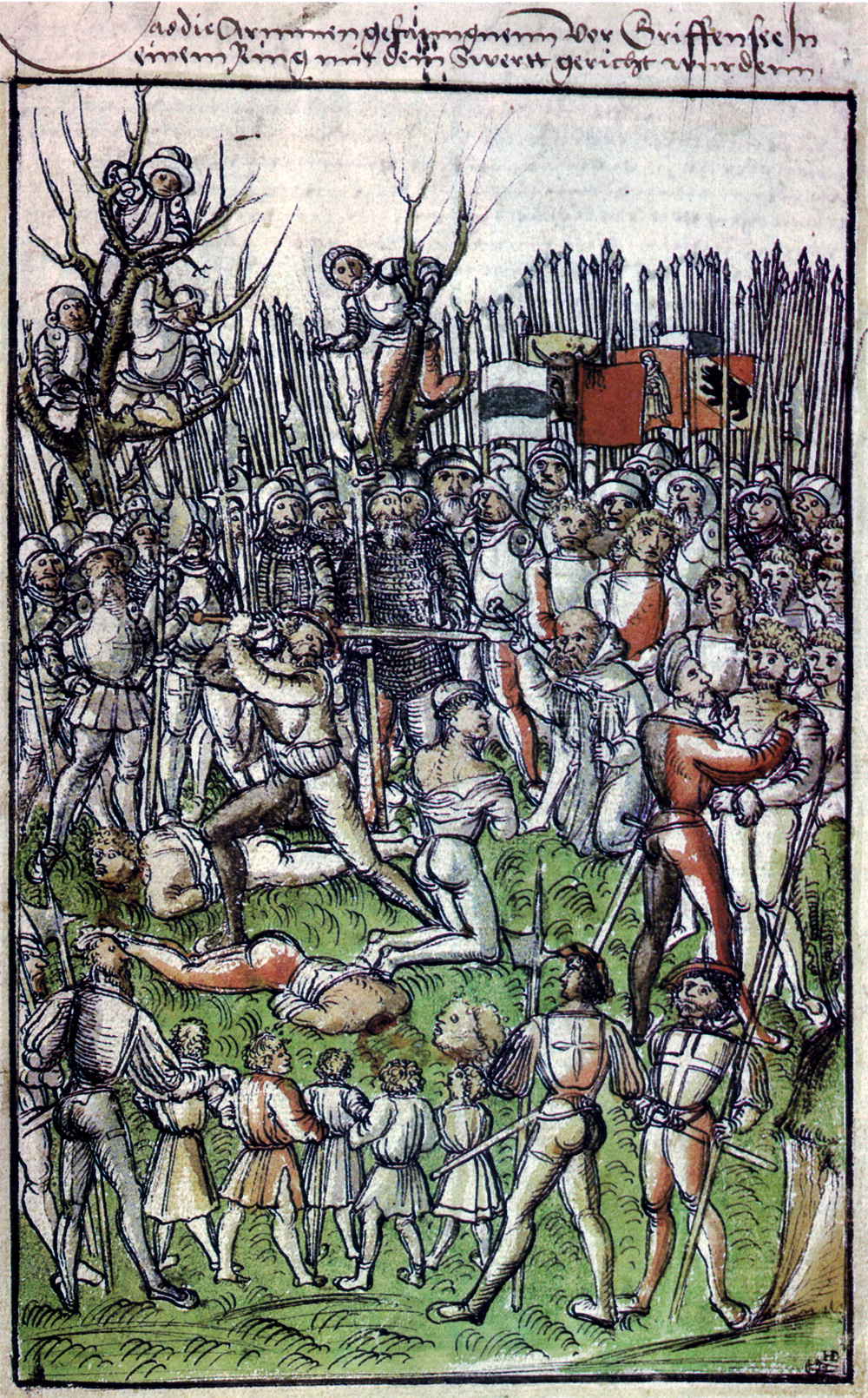
Execution of the defenders of Greifensee during the Old Zurich War, from Schodeler's chronicle, c. 1515.

Probably in the late 12th century, a tower house (later Castle of Greifensee) was built at the location of a small village, estimated to be a settlement by the Counts of Rapperswil. On April 29, 1260, «R. et H. minstri de Grifense» are mentioned.

Greifensee was a bailiwick (Landvogtei, Amt), of Rapperswil, of Toggenburg and of Zurich, during 1300–1798. On January 7, 1300, Greifensee was given by Elisabeth von Rapperswil-Habsburg-Laufenburg, the sister of Rudolf V, Count of Rapperswil, to the nobleman Hermann II of Landenberg. His son, Hermann IV (the younger Marshal), fortified the small town, Greifensee castle and the city walls. He donated, for his salvation and on his wife's favour, the Gallus Chapel around 1330–1340, Greifensee's former Parish church, too.

In 1369, the Amt of Greifensee was sold to Count Friedrich Donat Diethelm of Toggenburg; in early 1402, Friedrich VII sold it to the city of Zürich, and beginning in 1419, Greifensee is the first country bailiwick of the city of Zurich.

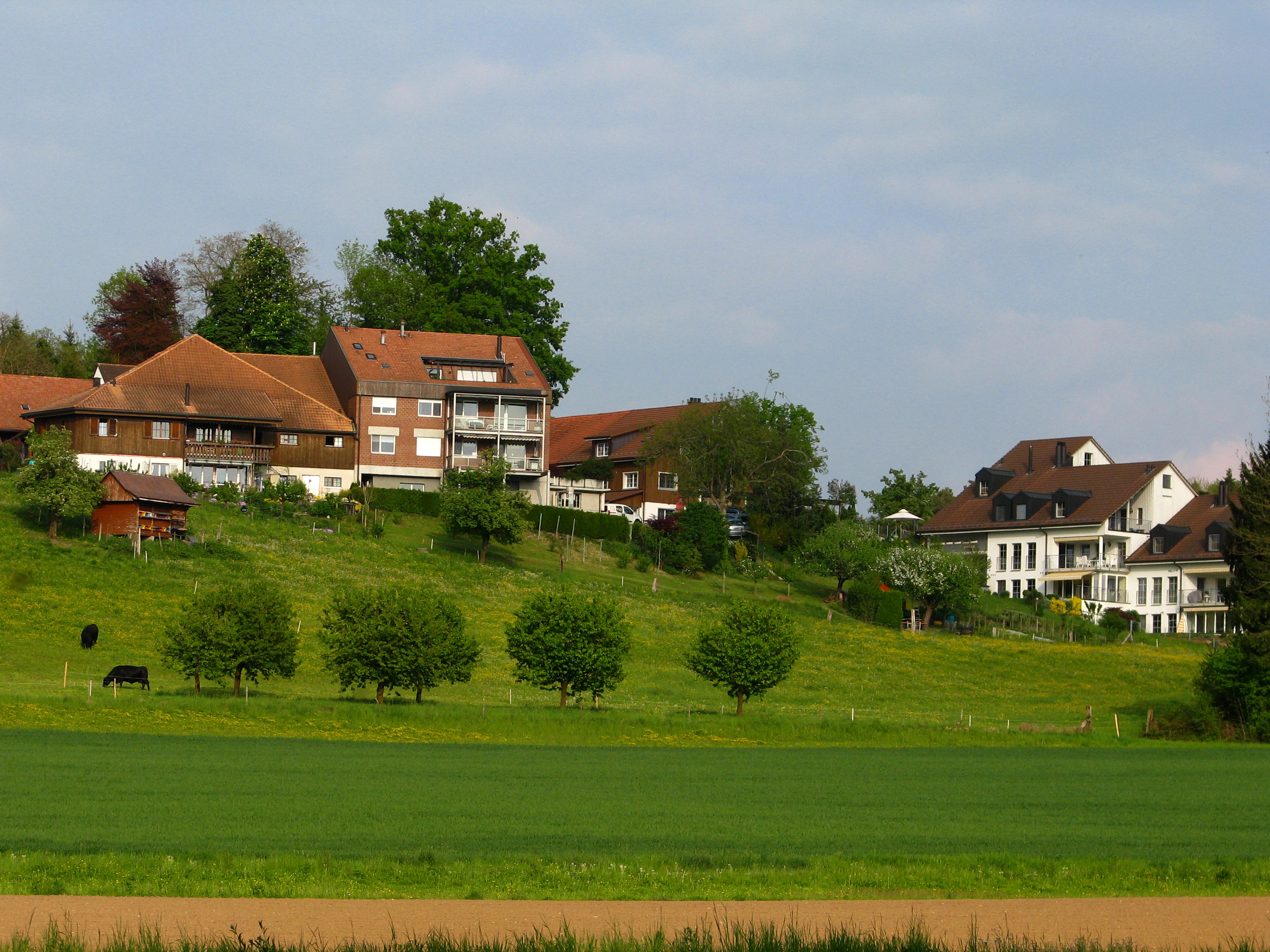
Wildsberg

Aerial view from 250 m by Walter Mittelholzer (1927)

In May 1444, during the Old Zurich War, the Old Swiss Confederacy laid siege to Greifensee which was held by about 70 defenders, most of them inhabitants of the Amt Greifensee with a few Habsburg and Zurich soldiers. The town was captured after four weeks, on May 27, and all but two of the surviving 64 defenders were beheaded on the next day, including the leader, Wildhans von Breitenlandenberg. Breitenlandenberg's body was brought to his family, the bodies of the other surrenders were buried at the Uster church. Even in times of war, mass execution was widely considered a cruel and unjust deed. On May 29, the Castle of Greifensee and the city walls were broken.

=== Early modern and modern history ===
In the year 1520, Zurich decided to reconstruct the ruins as residence of Zurich’s Landvögte among them Heinrich Biberli (1403), Gerold Edlibach (1504) and Salomon Landolt (1776).

The canting coat of arms (or, a griffin rampant gules) dates to the 15th century, replacing the older Landenberg arms of party per cross or and sable. It was adopted as municipal coat of arms in 1930.

== Geography ==
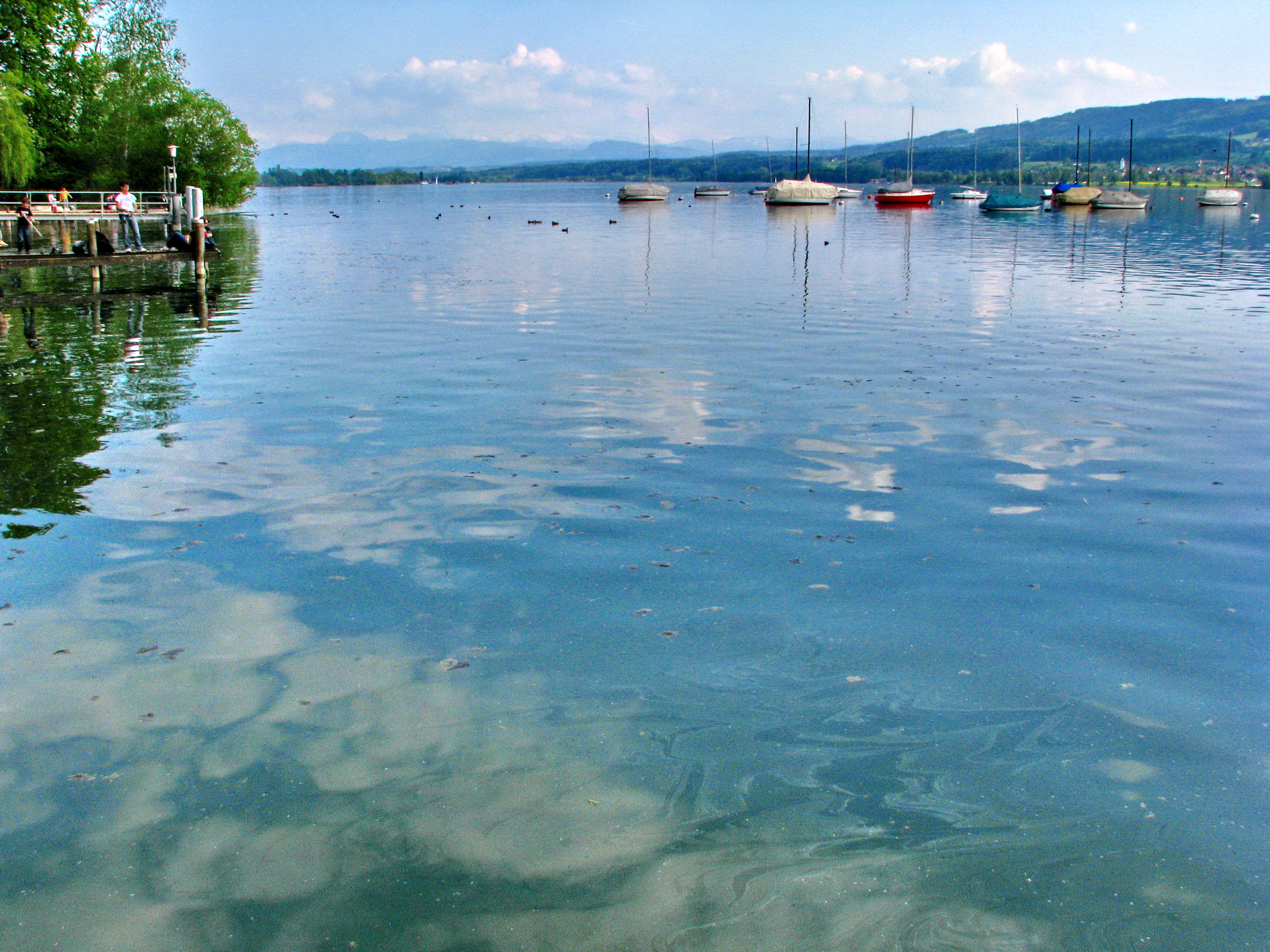
Lake Greifen (Greifensee)

Greifensee has an area of 2.3 km^{2} (0.89 sq mi). Of this area, 37.3% is used for agricultural purposes, while 11.6% is forested. Of the rest of the land, 44.6% is settled (buildings or roads) and the remainder (6.4%) is non-productive (rivers, glaciers or mountains). In 1996 housing and buildings made up 37.8% of the total area, while transportation infrastructure made up the rest (6.5%). Of the total unproductive area, water (streams and lakes) made up 0% of the area. As of 2007 37.5% of the total municipal area was undergoing some type of construction.

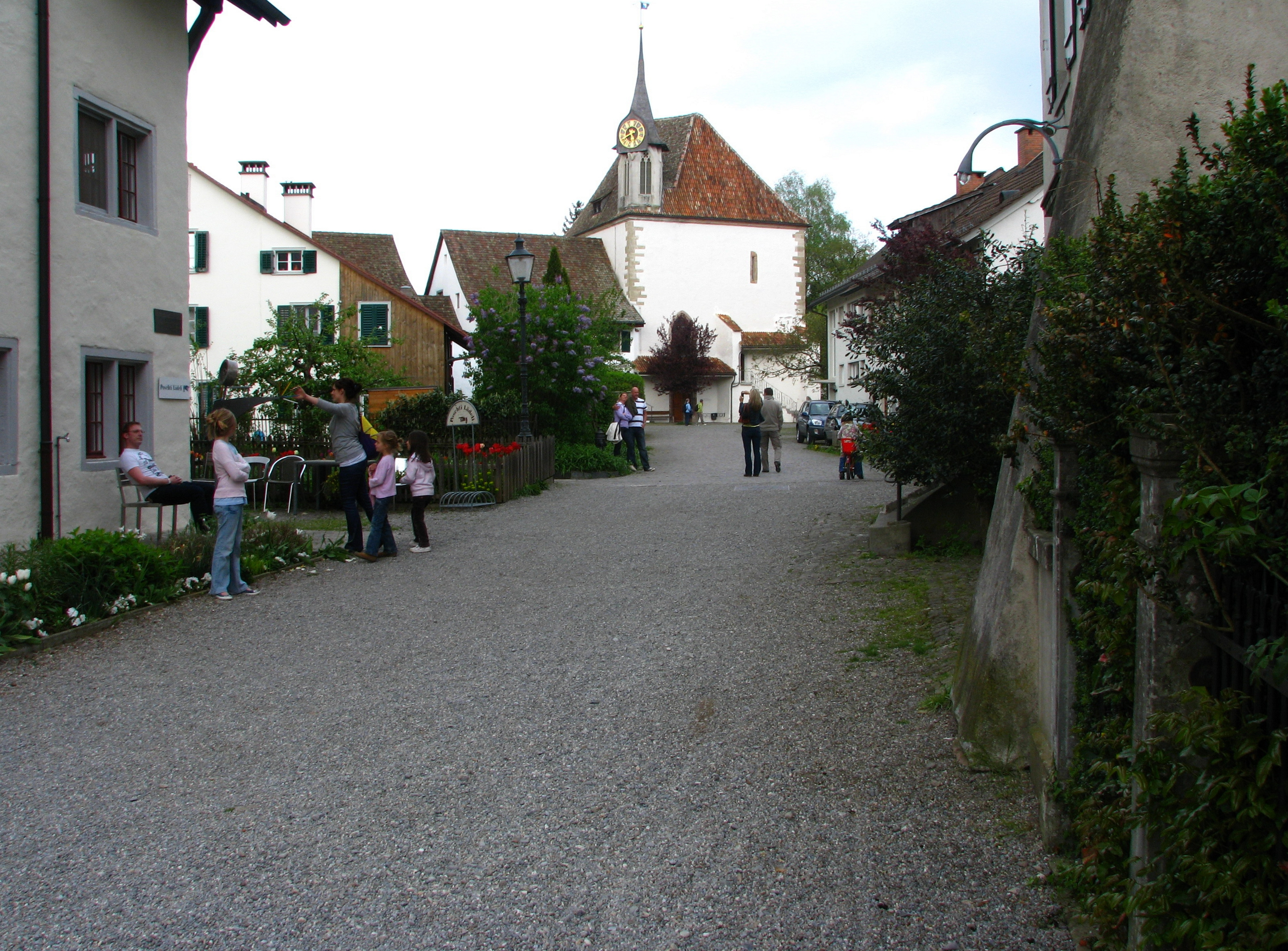
Altstadt and Gallus chapel

It is located on the lake Greifensee, approximately 12 km (7.5 mi) to the east of Zurich. The town has a historic part complete with a castle and a unique church (Gallus Chapel) which was shaped as a triangle so it could fit into the city walls.

== Demographics ==
Greifensee has a population (as of 31 December 2020) of 5,307. As of 2007, 15.2% of the population was made up of foreign nationals. As of 2008 the gender distribution of the population was 49.2% male and 50.8% female. Over the last 10 years the population has decreased at a rate of -0.2%. Most of the population (as of 2000) speaks German (88.3%), with French being second most common ( 1.7%) and Italian being third ( 1.5%).

In the 2007 election the most popular party was the SVP which received 25.6% of the vote. The next three most popular parties were the SPS (21%), the FDP (15%) and the CSP (13%).

The age distribution of the population (as of 2000) is children and teenagers (0–19 years old) make up 25.3% of the population, while adults (20–64 years old) make up 65% and seniors (over 64 years old) make up 9.7%. The entire Swiss population is generally well educated. In Greifensee about 85.5% of the population (between age 25-64) have completed either non-mandatory upper secondary education or additional higher education (either university or a Fachhochschule). There are 2198 households in Greifensee.

As of 2008 there were 1464 Catholics and 2085 Protestants in Greifensee. In the 2000 census, religion was broken down into several smaller categories. From the census, 48.1% were some type of Protestant, with 44% belonging to the Swiss Reformed Church and 4.1% belonging to other Protestant churches. 31.3% of the population were Catholic. Of the rest of the population, 0% were Muslim, 3.9% belonged to another religion (not listed), 3.2% did not give a religion, and 12.7% were atheist or agnostic.

The historical population is given in the following table:

| year | population |
|---|---|
| 1634 | 133 |
| 1799 | 278 |
| 1836 | 406 |
| 1850 | 396 |
| 1900 | 289 |
| 1950 | 279 |
| 1960 | 421 |
| 1970 | 2,674 |
| 1980 | 5,423 |
| 2000 | 5,242 |

== Cultural Heritage ==
Located on Greifensee lakeshore, Greifensee–Storen–Wildsberg is part of the 56 Swiss sites of the UNESCO World Heritage Site Prehistoric pile dwellings around the Alps, and the settlement is also listed in the Swiss inventory of cultural property of national and regional significance as a Class object. Because the lake has grown in size over time, the original piles are now around 4 metres (13 ft) to 7 metres (23 ft) under the water level of 406 metres (1,332 ft).

== Industry ==
Mettler Toledo has one of its world headquarters in Greifensee and is also the towns biggest employer.

Greifensee has an unemployment rate of 1.92%. As of 2005, there were 21 people employed in the primary economic sector and about 7 businesses involved in this sector. 557 people are employed in the secondary sector and there are 21 businesses in this sector. 548 people are employed in the tertiary sector, with 99 businesses in this sector. As of 2007 43.8% of the working population were employed full-time, and 56.3% were employed part-time.

== Transport ==
Nänikon-Greifensee railway station is a stop of the Zurich S-Bahn on the lines S9 and S14. It is a 16-minute (S9) ride from Zürich Hauptbahnhof.

== Notable people ==
- Johann Jakob Bodmer (1698 in Greifensee – 1783) a Swiss author, academic, critic and poet
- Sándor Végh (1912–1997) a Hungarian, later French, violinist and conductor; lived in Greifensee from 1971
