= Andelfingen, Switzerland =

Andelfingen
- Municipality
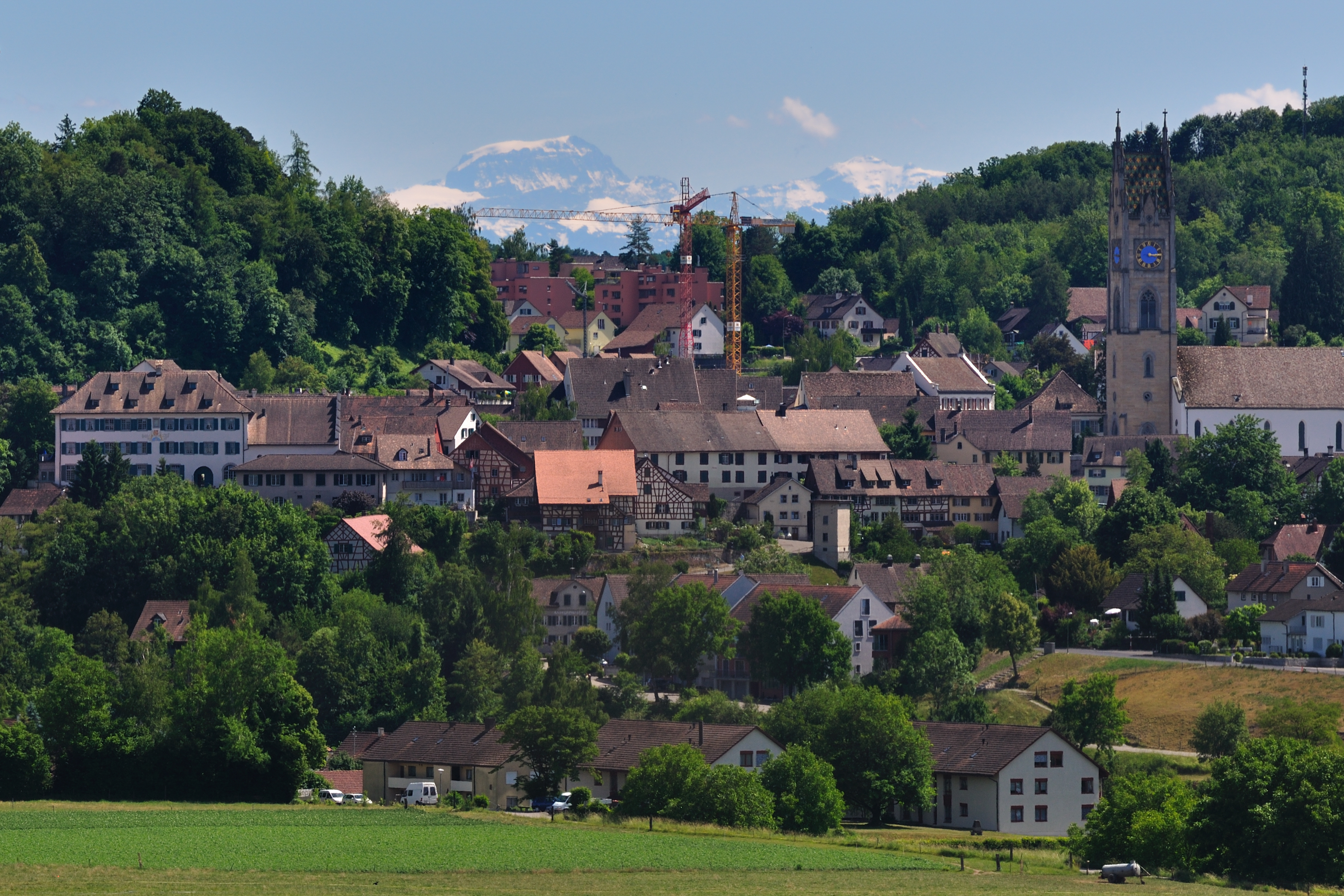

- Flag Coat of arms
- Location of Andelfingen
- Location within Switzerland Location within Canton of Zurich
- Coordinates: 47°35′N 8°41′E
- Country: Switzerland
- Canton: Zurich
- District: Andelfingen

Area
  - Total: 6.65 km^{2} (2.57 sq mi)
- Elevation: 370 m (1,210 ft)

Population (December 2020)
  - Total: 2,232
  - Density: 336/km^{2} (869/sq mi)
- Time zone: UTC+01:00 (CET)
  - Summer (DST): UTC+02:00 (CEST)
- Postal code: 8450
- SFOS number: 291
- ISO 3166 code: CH-ZH
- Surrounded by: Adlikon, Dorf, Flaach, Humlikon, Kleinandelfingen, Ossingen, Volken
- Website: www.andelfingen.ch

Andelfingen is a village and a municipality in the district of Andelfingen in the canton of Zürich in Switzerland. On 1 January 2023 the former municipalities of Adlikon and Humlikon merged to form the municipality of Andelfingen.

== History ==
Andelfingen is first mentioned in 1248 as Andelfingon. Until 1970, it was known as Grossandelfingen.

== Geography ==
Aerial view from 300 m by Walter Mittelholzer (1919)

Andelfingen has an area of 6.7 km^{2} (2.6 sq mi). Of this area, 47.4% is used for agricultural purposes, while 34.1% is forested. Of the rest of the land, 14.2% is settled (buildings or roads) and the remainder (4.3%) is non-productive (rivers, glaciers or mountains).

The municipality is the capital of the district of Andelfingen. It is located on the southern banks of the river Thur.

== Demographics ==
Andelfingen has a population (as of 31 December 2020) of 2,232. As of 2007, 11.6% of the population was made up of foreign nationals. Over the last 10 years the population has grown at a rate of 10.1%. Most of the population (as of 2000) speaks German (89.5%), with Italian being second most common (3.9%) and Serbo-Croatian being third (1.6%).

In the 2007 election, the most popular party was the SVP which received 39.8% of the vote. The next three most popular parties were the CSP (15.6%), the FDP (15.1%) and the SPS (13.2%).

The age distribution of the population (as of 2000) is children and teenagers (0–19 years old) make up 24.7% of the population, while adults (20–64 years old) make up 59.8% and seniors (over 64 years old) make up 15.5%. In Andelfingen about 77.3% of the population (between age 25–64) have completed either non-mandatory upper secondary education or additional higher education (either university or a Fachhochschule).

Andelfingen has an unemployment rate of 0.9%. As of 2005, there were 41 people employed in the primary economic sector and about 16 businesses involved in this sector. 527 people are employed in the secondary sector and there are 34 businesses in this sector. 530 people are employed in the tertiary sector, with 90 businesses in this sector. The historical population is given in the following table:

Year	Population
1467	58 households
1634	413
1850	730
1900	855
1950	931
1970	1,453
1990	1,576

== Transportation ==
Andelfingen railway station is a stop of the S-Bahn Zürich on the lines S12, S24 and S33.
