= Usterbrand =

1832 machine-breaking in Uster

- Engraving of the fire
- Date: 22 November 1832
- Location: Oberuster, Uster, canton of Zurich
- Type: Machine-breaking
- Target: Mechanical spinning and weaving mill of Corrodi & Pfister
- Arrests: 75

The Usterbrand (lit. 'Uster fire'; French: incendie d'Uster; Italian: incendio di Uster) was the most significant case of machine-breaking in Switzerland. On 22 November 1832, the day of the commemoration of the Ustertag of 1830, an angry crowd destroyed the mechanical spinning and weaving mill of Corrodi & Pfister in Oberuster, in Uster.

== Background ==
The background was the distress of the small manufacturers (Tüchler) and home weavers of the Zürcher Oberland. Through their turnout at the Ustertag, they had contributed to the fall of the conservative government of the city of Zurich, but the new liberal Grand Council had not responded to their demand, recorded in the "Uster Memorial", for a ban on weaving machines. The small manufacturers and home workers, however, do not appear to have played a leading part in the attack.

== Aftermath ==
Seventy-five people were arrested at the scene and in the Zürcher Oberland. In 1833 the main culprits were sentenced to long terms of penal labor in chains (Kettenstrafe), but they were amnestied in 1839 after the Züriputsch. In 1835 the Grand Council passed a law for the protection of property.

== Bibliography ==
- F. L. Keller, Die gewaltsame Brandstiftung in Uster am 22. Nov. 1832, 1833
- A. Hauser, "Der Maschinensturm von Uster", in Zürcher Taschenbuch 1958, 1957, 107–116
- A. Bauhofer, "Der Brand von Uster und das Gesetz zum Schutze des Eigentums", in Zürcher Taschenbuch 1965, 1964, 84–96
- E. Bucher, "Ein sozio-ökonomisches und ein politisches Kapitel aus der Regeneration", in Schweizerische Zeitschrift für Geschichte, 32, 1982, 5–124
