= Rorbas =

- Municipality
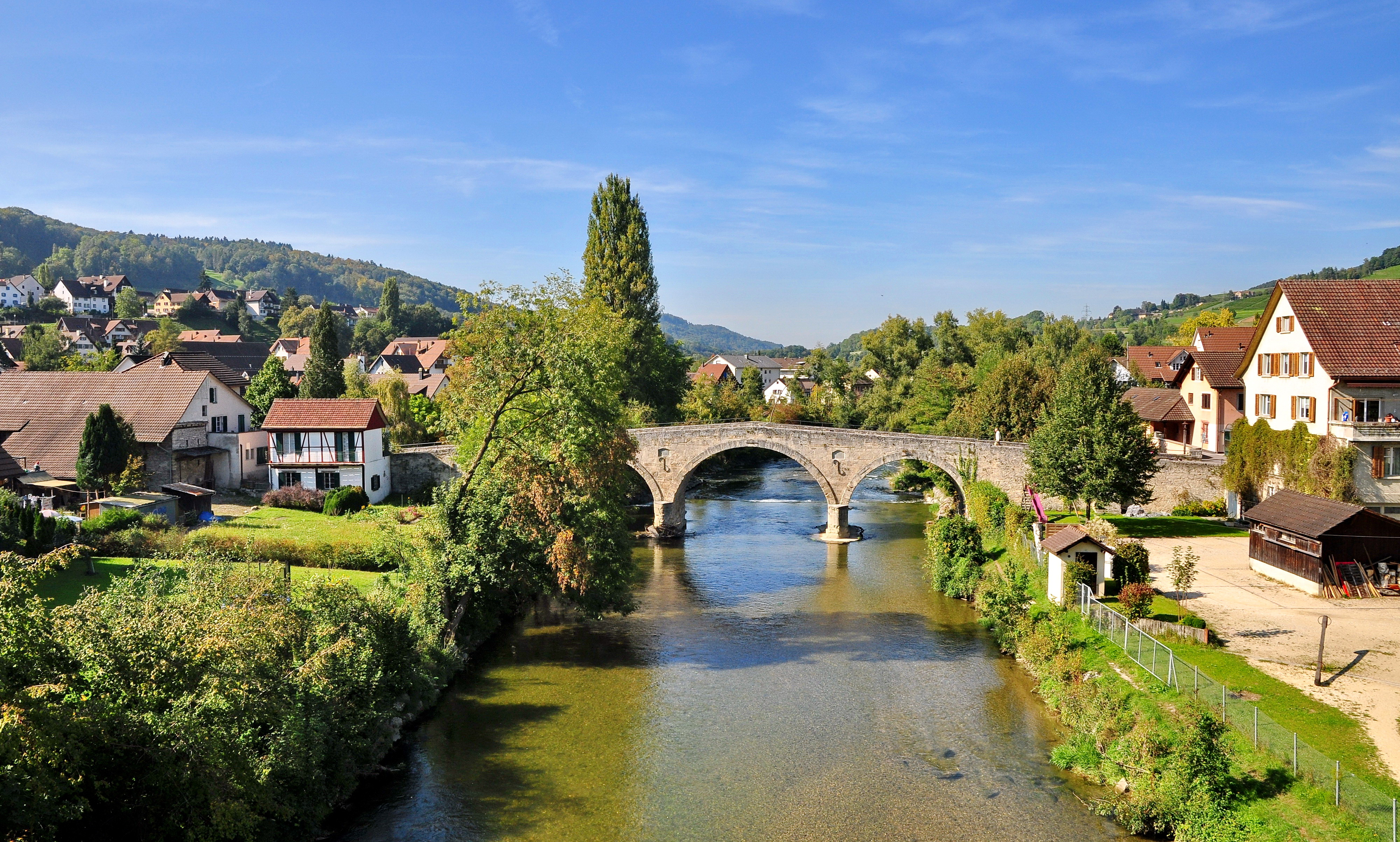

- Flag Coat of arms
- Location of Rorbas
- Location within Switzerland Location within Canton of Zurich
- Coordinates: 47°32′N 8°35′E
- Country: Switzerland
- Canton: Zurich
- District: Bülach

Area
  - Total: 4.44 km^{2} (1.71 sq mi)
- Elevation: 395 m (1,296 ft)

Population (December 2020)
  - Total: 2,885
  - Density: 650/km^{2} (1,680/sq mi)
- Time zone: UTC+01:00 (CET)
  - Summer (DST): UTC+02:00 (CEST)
- Postal code: 8427
- SFOS number: 68
- ISO 3166 code: CH-ZH
- Surrounded by: Bülach, Eglisau, Embrach, Freienstein-Teufen
- Website: www.rorbas.ch

Rorbas is a municipality in the district of Bülach in the canton of Zürich in Switzerland.

== Geography ==
Aerial view (1953)

Rorbas has an area of 4.5 km^{2} (1.7 sq mi)—where 35.7% is used for agricultural purposes, 46.6% is forested and 15% is settled (buildings or roads). The remainder (2.7%) is non-productive (rivers, glaciers or mountains).

Rorbas is situated in the lower Töss Valley.

== Demographics ==
Rorbas had a population (as of 31 December 2020) of 2,885. in 2007. 18.8% of the population was made up of foreign nationals. Over the last 10 years, the population has grown at a rate of 0.8%. Most of the population in 2000 spoke German (87.1%), with Italian the second most common (2.8%) and Portuguese third (1.8%).

In the 2007 election, the most popular party was the Swiss People's Party (SVP) which received 44.2% of the vote, followed by the Social Democratic Party of Switzerland (SPS) with 19.4%, the Christian Social Party (CSP) with 13.3% and the Green Party with 9.8%.

The age distribution of the population in 2000 was 26.8% for children and teenagers (0–19 years old), while adults (20–64 years old) made up the 64.6%, and seniors (over 64 years old) made up the 8.7%. About 77.6% of the population (between age 25-64) had completed either non-mandatory upper secondary education or additional higher education (either university or a Fachhochschule).

Rorbas had an unemployment rate of 1.77% in 2005. There were 57 people employed in the primary economic sector in 11 businesses. 96 people were employed in the secondary sector in 23 businesses. 360 people were employed in the tertiary sector, with 67 businesses.

== Gallery ==
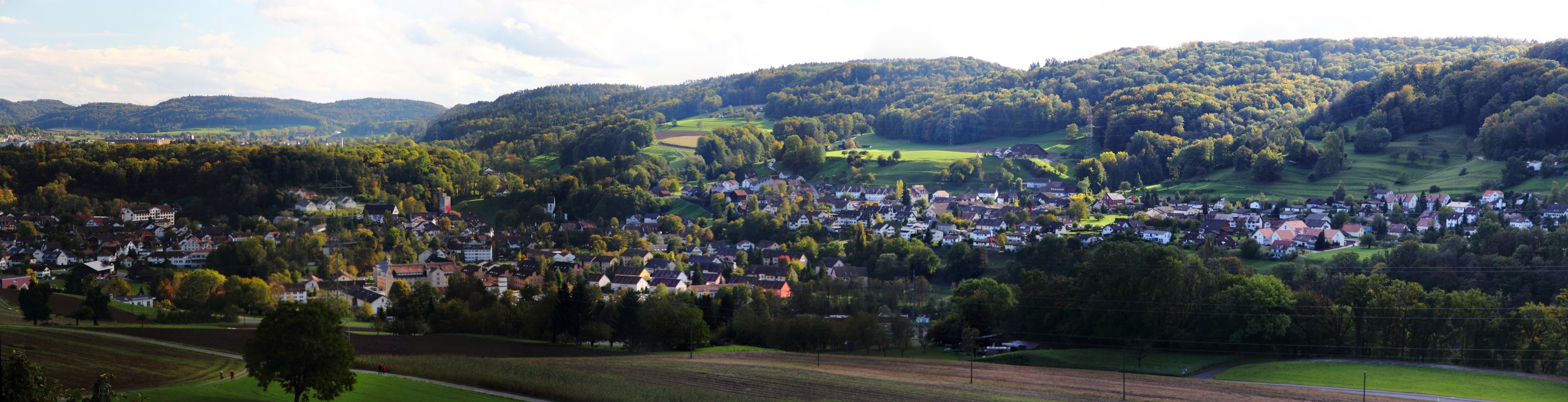
Panoramic View of Rorbas and the Töss valley

== Transport ==
Embrach-Rorbas railway station is served by Zurich S-Bahn line S41, linking the communities, Winterthur and Waldshut.
