= Embrach-Rorbas railway station =

Railway station in Switzerland

Embrach-Rorbas
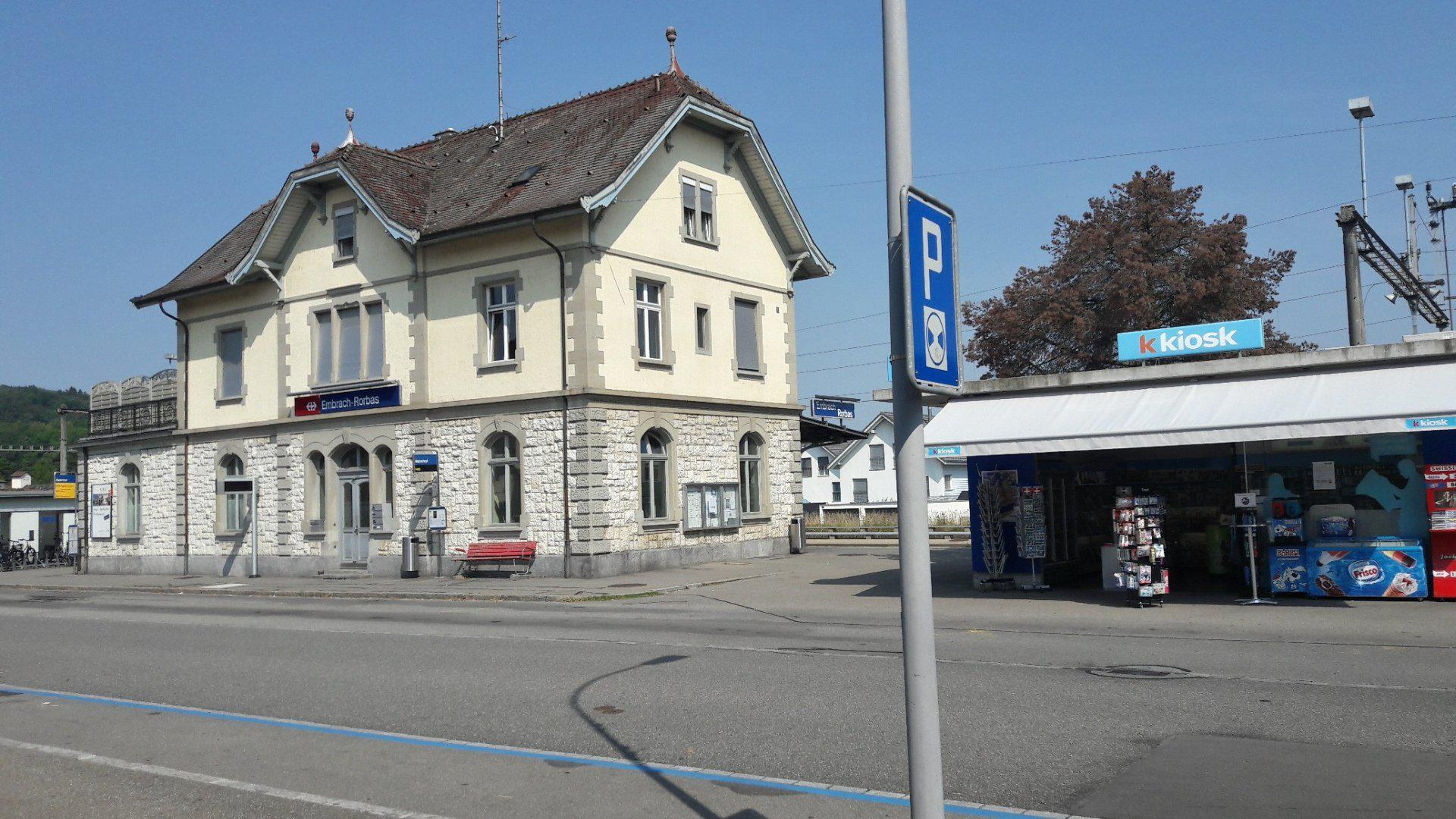
- The station building in 2018

General information
- Location: Stationsstrasse; Embrach, Zurich; Switzerland
- Coordinates: 47.520577°N 8.586631°E
- Elevation: 423 m (1,388 ft)
- Owner: Swiss Federal Railways
- Operator: Thurbo
- Line: Winterthur–Bülach–Koblenz
- Connections: Zurich Transport Network (ZVV)
- Bus: PostAuto lines 520 522

Other information
- Fare zone: 123 (ZVV)

Services
| Preceding station | Zurich S-Bahn | Following station |
|---|---|---|
| Bülach Terminus | S41 | Pfungen towards Winterthur |
| Bülach Terminus | SN41 Limited service | Pfungen towards Winterthur |
Location
- Location within Switzerland Location within Canton of Zurich

Embrach-Rorbas railway station is a railway station in the municipality of Embrach in the canton of Zurich, Switzerland. The station takes its name from that municipality, and the adjoining municipality of Rorbas. It is located on the Winterthur to Koblenz line, within fare zone 123 of the Zürcher Verkehrsverbund (ZVV).

== Services ==
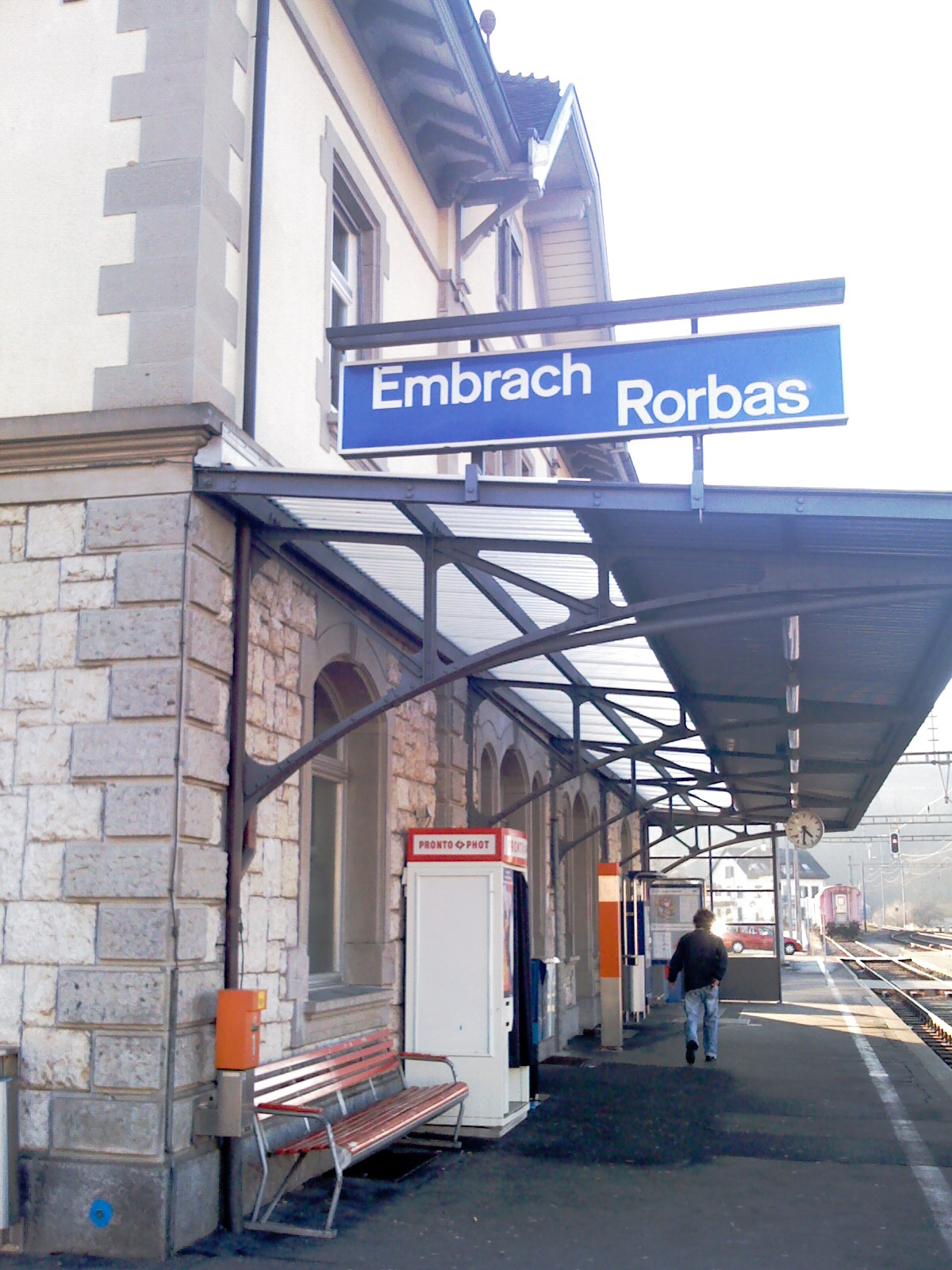
The station in 2008

The railway station is served by Zurich S-Bahn line S41, which operates between Bülach and Winterthur.

- Zurich S-Bahn S41: half-hourly service to Bülach and Winterthur.

During weekends, there is also a Nighttime S-Bahn service (SN41) offered by ZVV.

- SN41: hourly service to Bülach and Winterthur.

The station is additionally served by PostAuto bus routes.

== See also ==
- Rail transport in Switzerland
