= Neftenbach =

- Municipality
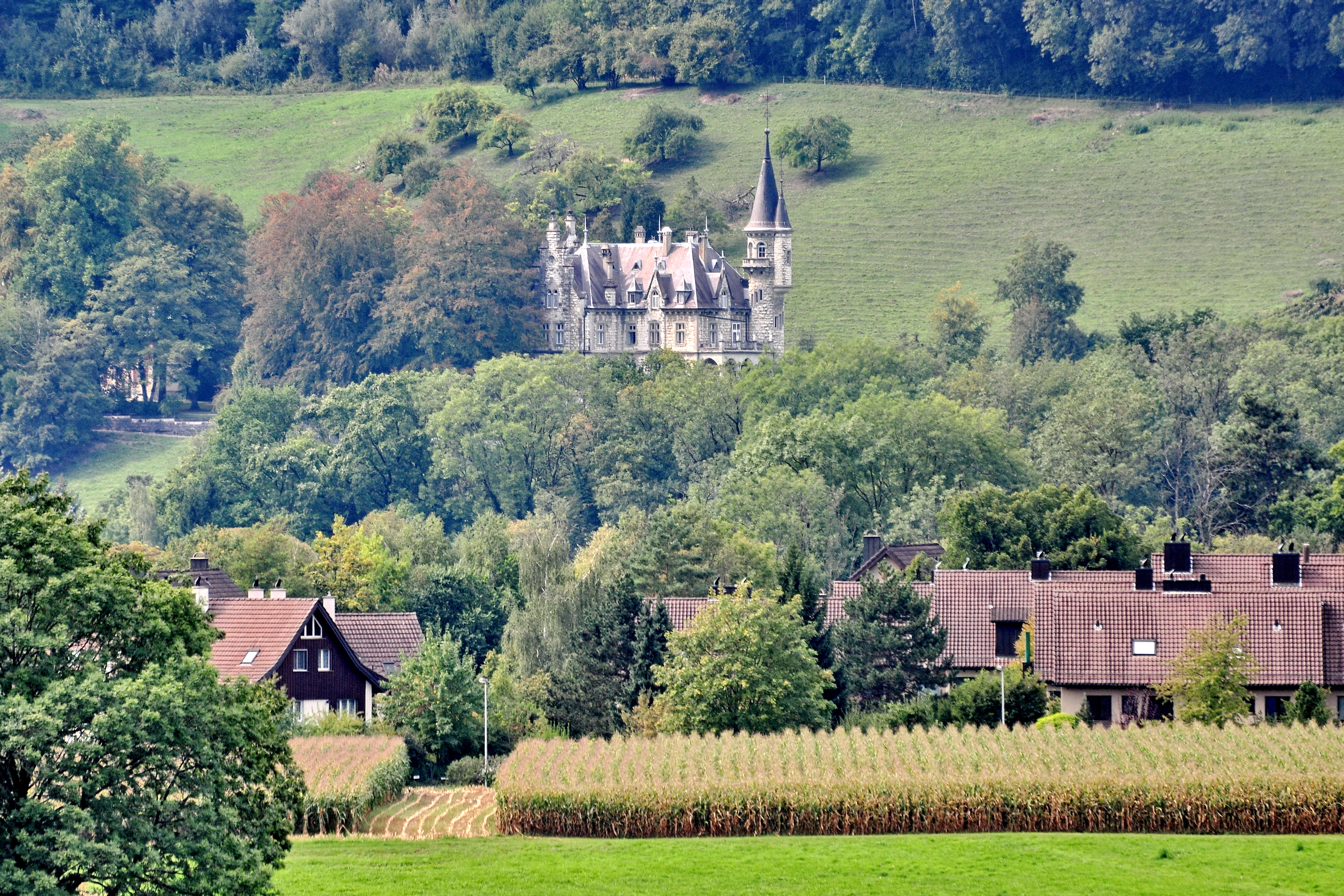

- Flag Coat of arms
- Location of Neftenbach
- Location within Switzerland Location within Canton of Zurich
- Coordinates: 47°32′N 8°40′E
- Country: Switzerland
- Canton: Zurich
- District: Winterthur

Area
  - Total: 14.95 km^{2} (5.77 sq mi)
- Elevation: 415 m (1,362 ft)

Population (December 2020)
  - Total: 5,756
  - Density: 385.0/km^{2} (997.2/sq mi)
- Time zone: UTC+01:00 (CET)
  - Summer (DST): UTC+02:00 (CEST)
- Postal code: 8413
- SFOS number: 223
- ISO 3166 code: CH-ZH
- Surrounded by: Buch am Irchel, Dättlikon, Dorf, Henggart, Hettlingen, Humlikon, Pfungen, Winterthur
- Website: www.neftenbach.ch

Neftenbach (German pronunciation: [ˈnɛftn̩ˌbax]) is a municipality in the district of Winterthur in the canton of Zürich in Switzerland. Besides the village of Neftenbach itself, the municipality includes the settlements of Hünikon, Aesch, Riet and Irchelhöfen.

== History ==
Neftenbach is first mentioned in 1209 as Neftinbach. The village was owned by the barons of Wart, whose arms were adopted as the municipal coat of arms in 1921.

Aerial view (1962)

== Geography ==
Neftenbach has an area of 15 km^{2} (5.8 sq mi). Of this area, 55.1% is used for agricultural purposes, while 29.8% is forested. Of the rest of the land, 14% is settled (buildings or roads) and the remainder (1%) is non-productive (rivers, glaciers or mountains). In 1996 housing and buildings made up 10.3% of the total area, while transportation infrastructure made up the rest (3.9%). Of the total unproductive area, water (streams and lakes) made up 0.5% of the area. As of 2007 9.6% of the total municipal area was undergoing some type of construction.

The municipality is located in the lower Töss Valley. It consists of the village of Neftenbach and the hamlets of Hünikon, Aesch, Riet and Irchelhöfen.

== Demographics ==
Neftenbach has a population (as of 31 December 2020) of 5,756. As of 2007, 9.3% of the population was made up of foreign nationals. As of 2008 the gender distribution of the population was 49.7% male and 50.3% female. Over the last 10 years the population has grown at a rate of 8.3%. Most of the population (as of 2000) speaks German (94.4%), with Italian being second most common ( 1.3%) and Albanian being third ( 1.1%).

In the 2007 election the most popular party was the SVP which received 42% of the vote. The next three most popular parties were the SPS (14.3%), the FDP (11.5%) and the CSP (11.3%).

The age distribution of the population (as of 2000) is children and teenagers (0–19 years old) make up 28.6% of the population, while adults (20–64 years old) make up 62.1% and seniors (over 64 years old) make up 9.3%. In Neftenbach about 83.6% of the population (between age 25-64) have completed either non-mandatory upper secondary education or additional higher education (either university or a Fachhochschule). There are 1782 households in Neftenbach.

Neftenbach has an unemployment rate of 1.29%. As of 2005, there were 225 people employed in the primary economic sector and about 56 businesses involved in this sector. 350 people are employed in the secondary sector and there are 52 businesses in this sector. 781 people are employed in the tertiary sector, with 129 businesses in this sector. As of 2007 42.3% of the working population were employed full-time, and 57.7% were employed part-time.

As of 2008 there were 1060 Catholics and 2678 Protestants in Neftenbach. In the 2000 census, religion was broken down into several smaller categories. From the census, 61.7% were some type of Protestant, with 56.6% belonging to the Swiss Reformed Church and 5.1% belonging to other Protestant churches. 21.8% of the population were Catholic. Of the rest of the population, 0% were Muslim, 3.1% belonged to another religion (not listed), 2.6% did not give a religion, and 10.6% were atheist or agnostic.

The historical population is given in the following table:

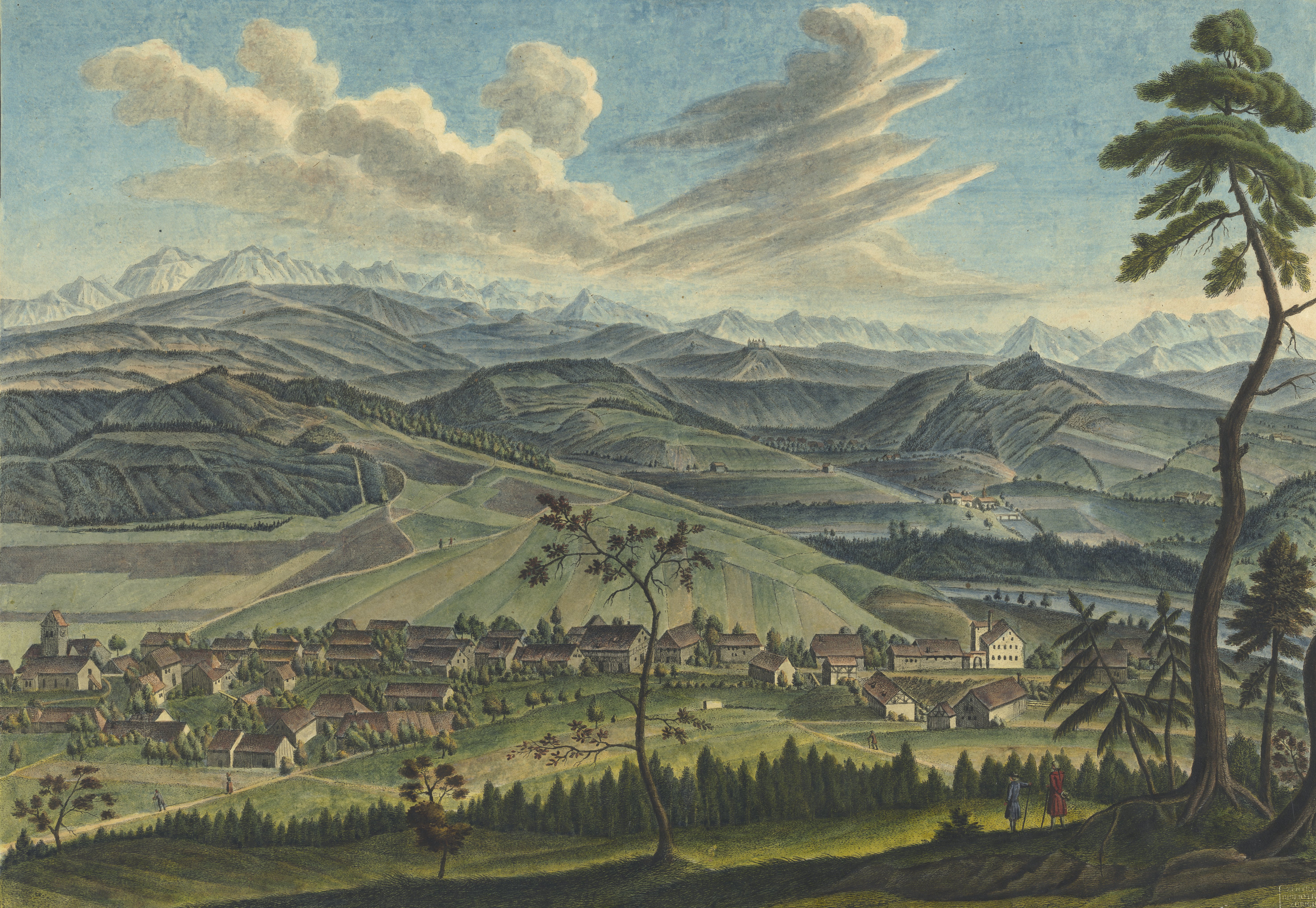
Neftenbach in 1781

year	population
1836	1,452
1850	1,490
1880	1,421
1900	1,608
1950	1,853
1970	2,180
2000	4,504

== Transport ==
Pfungen-Neftenbach railway station is served by Zurich S-Bahn line S41, which links Winterthur and Waldshut.
