= Pfungen =

- Municipality
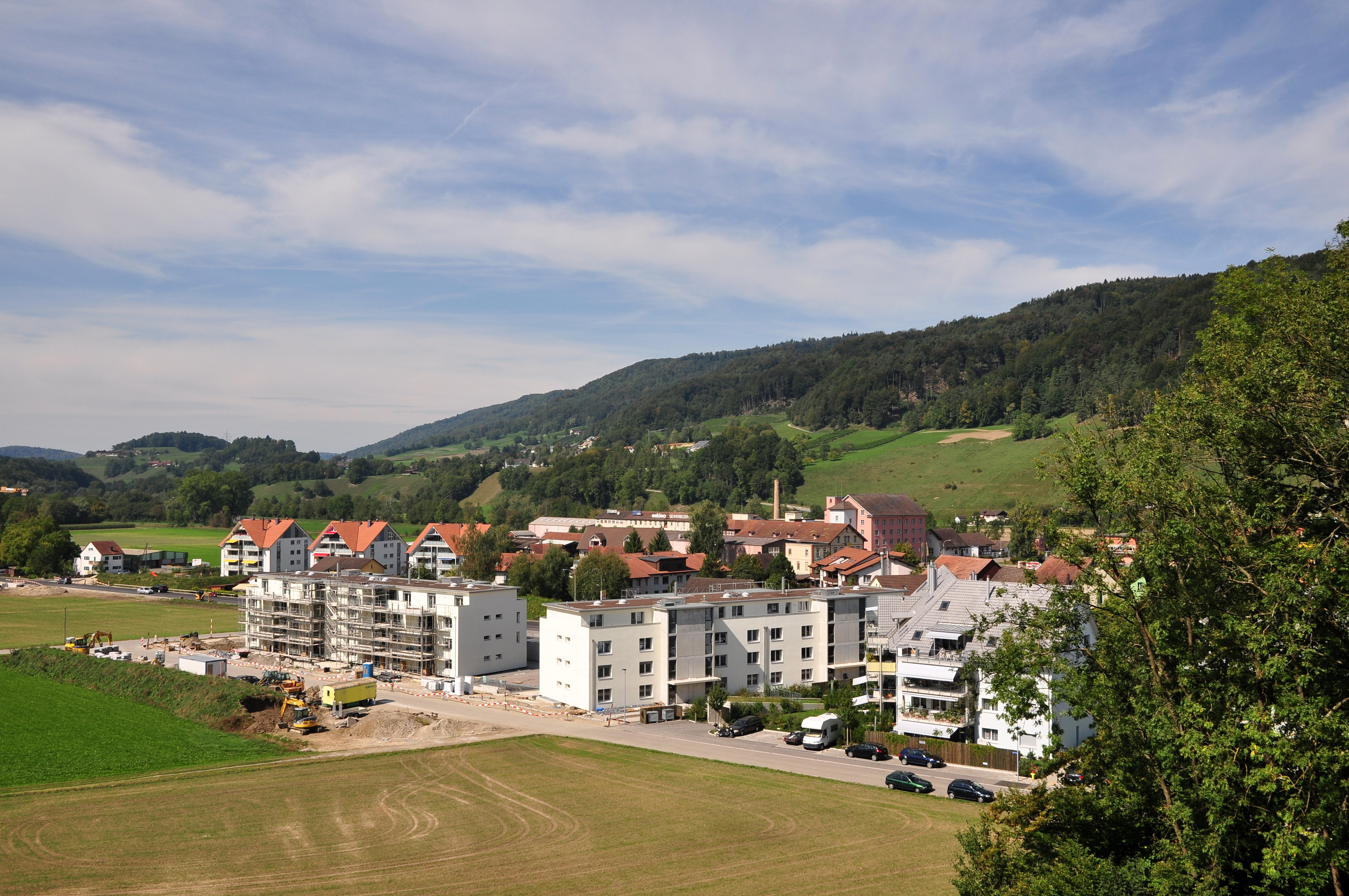

- Flag Coat of arms
- Location of Pfungen
- Location within Switzerland Location within Canton of Zurich
- Coordinates: 47°31′N 8°39′E
- Country: Switzerland
- Canton: Zurich
- District: Winterthur

Area
  - Total: 4.99 km^{2} (1.93 sq mi)
- Elevation: 412 m (1,352 ft)

Population (December 2020)
  - Total: 3,948
  - Density: 791/km^{2} (2,050/sq mi)
- Time zone: UTC+01:00 (CET)
  - Summer (DST): UTC+02:00 (CEST)
- Postal code: 8422
- SFOS number: 224
- ISO 3166 code: CH-ZH
- Surrounded by: Dättlikon, Embrach, Neftenbach, Oberembrach, Winterthur
- Website: www.pfungen.ch

Pfungen is a municipality in the district of Winterthur in the canton of Zürich in Switzerland.

== History ==
Pfungen is first mentioned in 993 as Funginga.

== Geography ==
Aerial view (1953)

Pfungen has an area of 5 km^{2} (1.9 sq mi). Of this area, 32.3% is used for agricultural purposes, while 41.6% is forested. Of the rest of the land, 24% is settled (buildings or roads) and the remainder (2%) is non-productive (rivers, glaciers or mountains). In 1996 housing and buildings made up 16.2% of the total area, while transportation infrastructure made up the rest (7.6%). Of the total unproductive area, water (streams and lakes) made up 1.6% of the area. As of 2007 22.3% of the total municipal area was undergoing some type of construction.

The municipality is located in the lower Töss Valley, with the village sitting on a spur of the Multberg and additional settlements in the Rums river valley. It consists of the village of Pfungen and settlements in the Rums river valley as well as the industrial development in Bruni.

== Demographics ==
Pfungen has a population (as of 31 December 2020) of 3,948. As of 2007, 22.4% of the population was made up of foreign nationals. As of 2008 the gender distribution of the population was 50.7% male and 49.3% female. Over the last 10 years the population has grown at a rate of 7.1%. Most of the population (as of 2000) speaks German (85.1%), with Italian being second most common ( 6.2%) and Turkish being third ( 2.5%).

In the 2007 election the most popular party was the SVP which received 48.7% of the vote. The next three most popular parties were the SPS (14.9%), the CSP (9.8%) and the FDP (8.9%).

The age distribution of the population (as of 2000) is children and teenagers (0–19 years old) make up 25.3% of the population, while adults (20–64 years old) make up 63.2% and seniors (over 64 years old) make up 11.5%. In Pfungen about 71.8% of the population (between age 25-64) have completed either non-mandatory upper secondary education or additional higher education (either university or a Fachhochschule). There are 1061 households in Pfungen.

Pfungen has an unemployment rate of 2.28%. As of 2005, there were 27 people employed in the primary economic sector and about 8 businesses involved in this sector. 283 people are employed in the secondary sector and there are 31 businesses in this sector. 321 people are employed in the tertiary sector, with 62 businesses in this sector. As of 2007 35% of the working population were employed full-time, and 65% were employed part-time.

As of 2008 there were 612 Catholics and 1266 Protestants in Pfungen. In the 2000 census, religion was broken down into several smaller categories. From the census, 52.3% were some type of Protestant, with 51.2% belonging to the Swiss Reformed Church and 1.1% belonging to other Protestant churches. 25.8% of the population were Catholic. Of the rest of the population, 0% were Muslim, 9.1% belonged to another religion (not listed), 3.4% did not give a religion, and 8.8% were atheist or agnostic.

The historical population is given in the following table:

| year | population |
|---|---|
| 1467 | c. 50 |
| 1633 | 240 |
| 1850 | 522 |
| 1900 | 1,061 |
| 1950 | 1,278 |
| 1970 | 1,870 |
| 2000 | 2,486 |

== Transport ==
Pfungen-Neftenbach railway station is served by Zurich S-Bahn line S41, which links Winterthur and Waldshut.
