= Töss Valley =

Valley in the canton of Zürich, Switzerland

Coordinates: 47°21′01″N 8°56′06″E

The Töss Valley (German: Tösstal) is a valley and a region of the canton of Zürich in Switzerland.

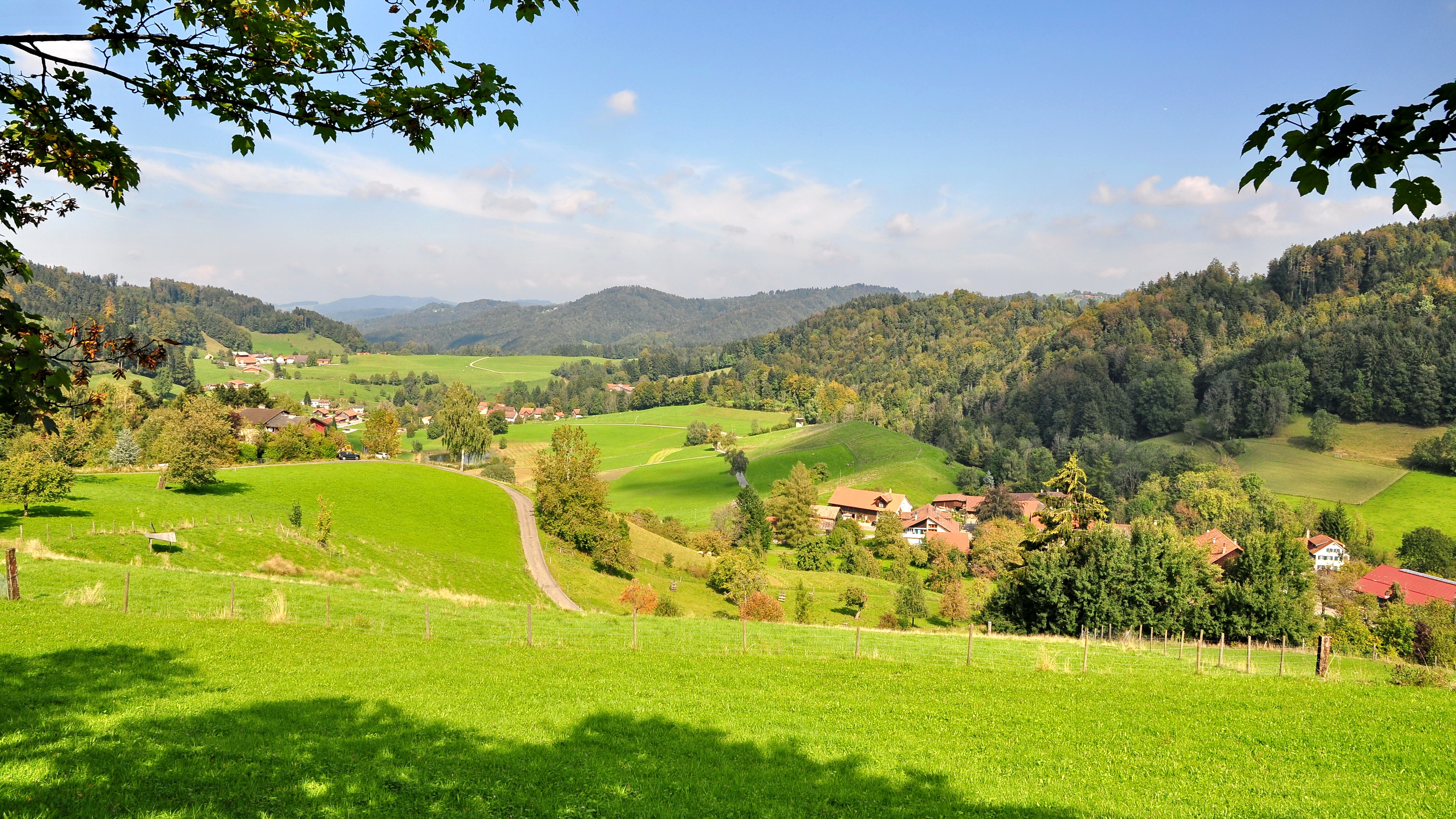
Töss valley at Bäretswil

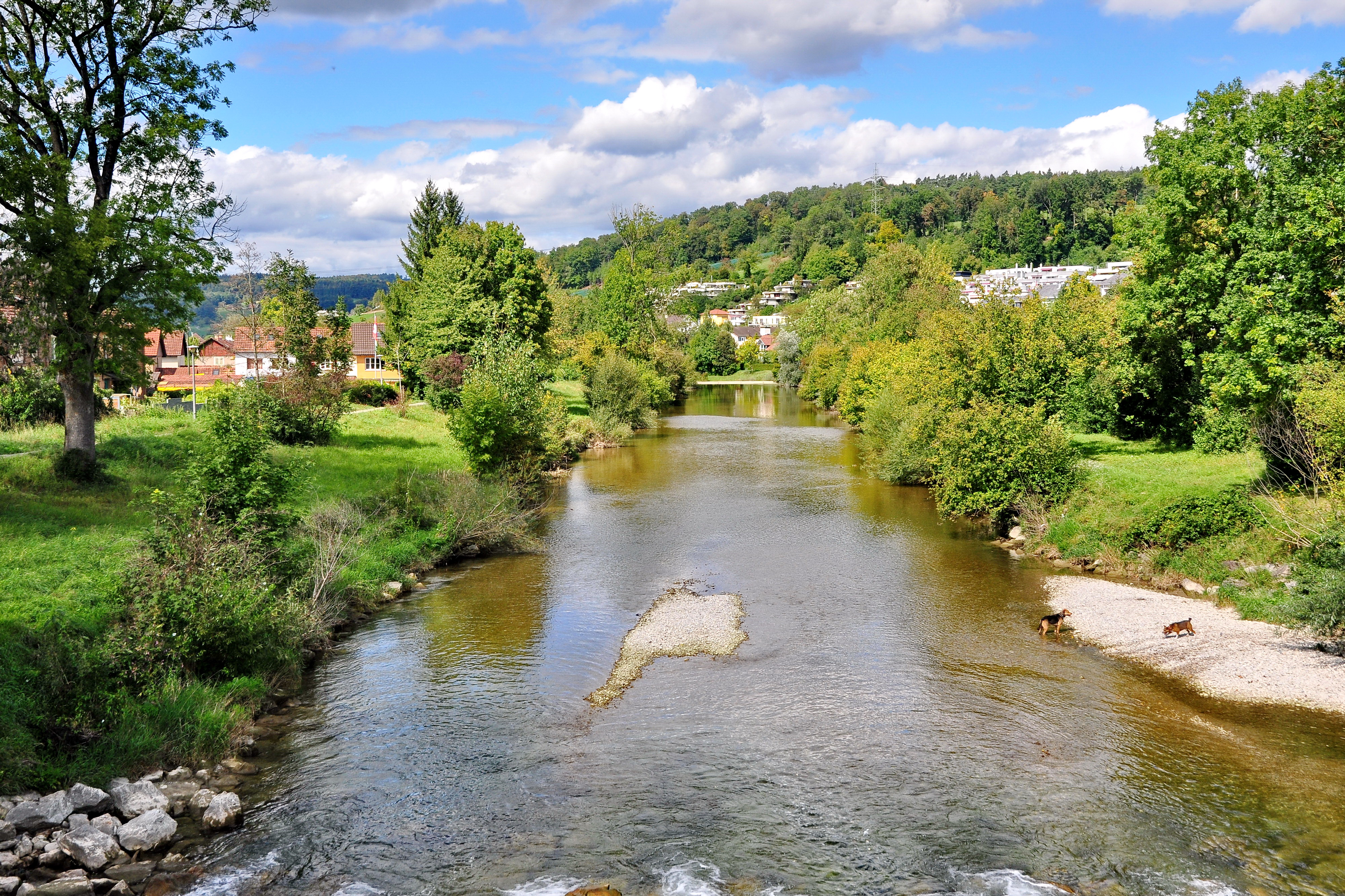
Winterthur Wülflingen

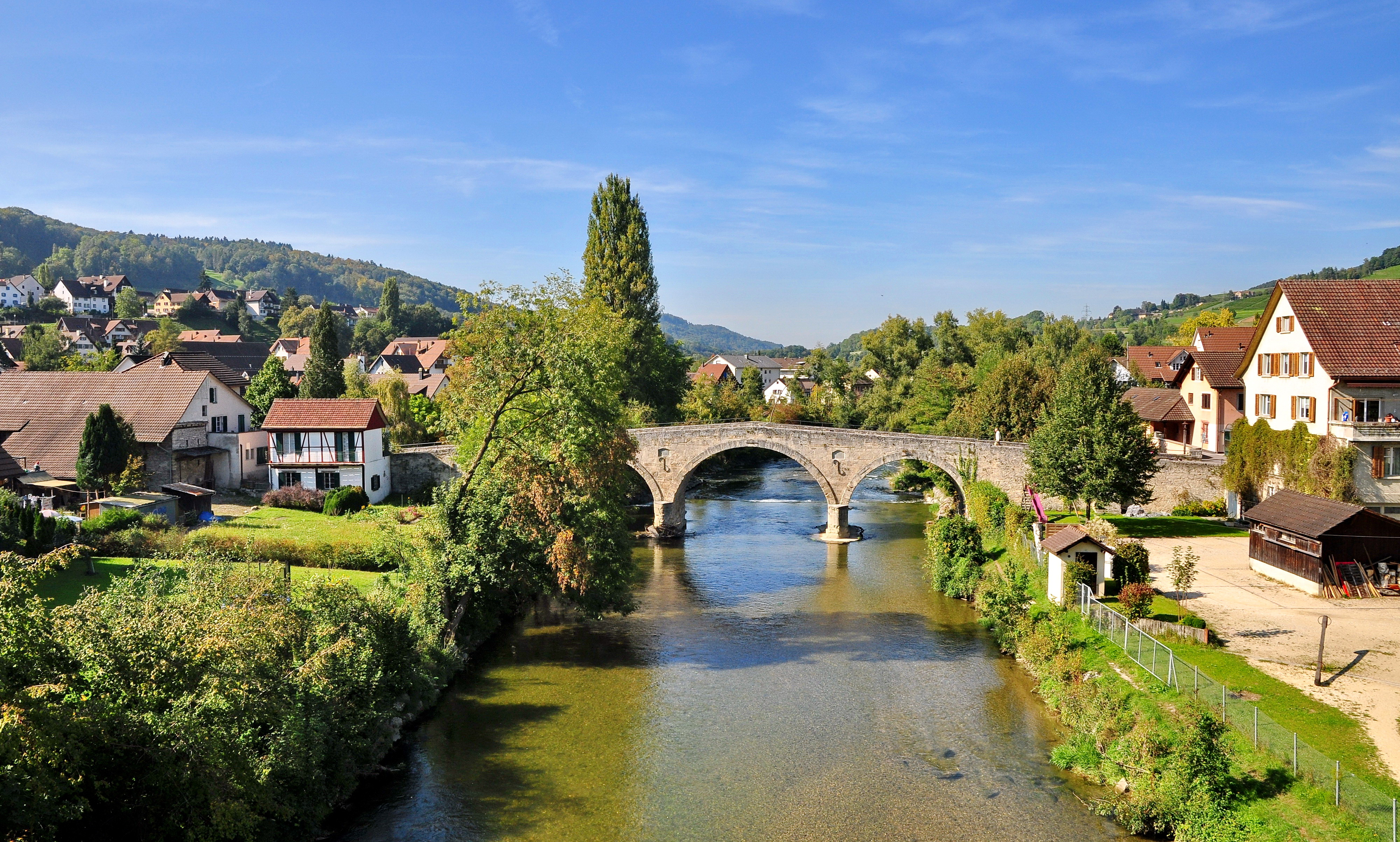
Rorbas

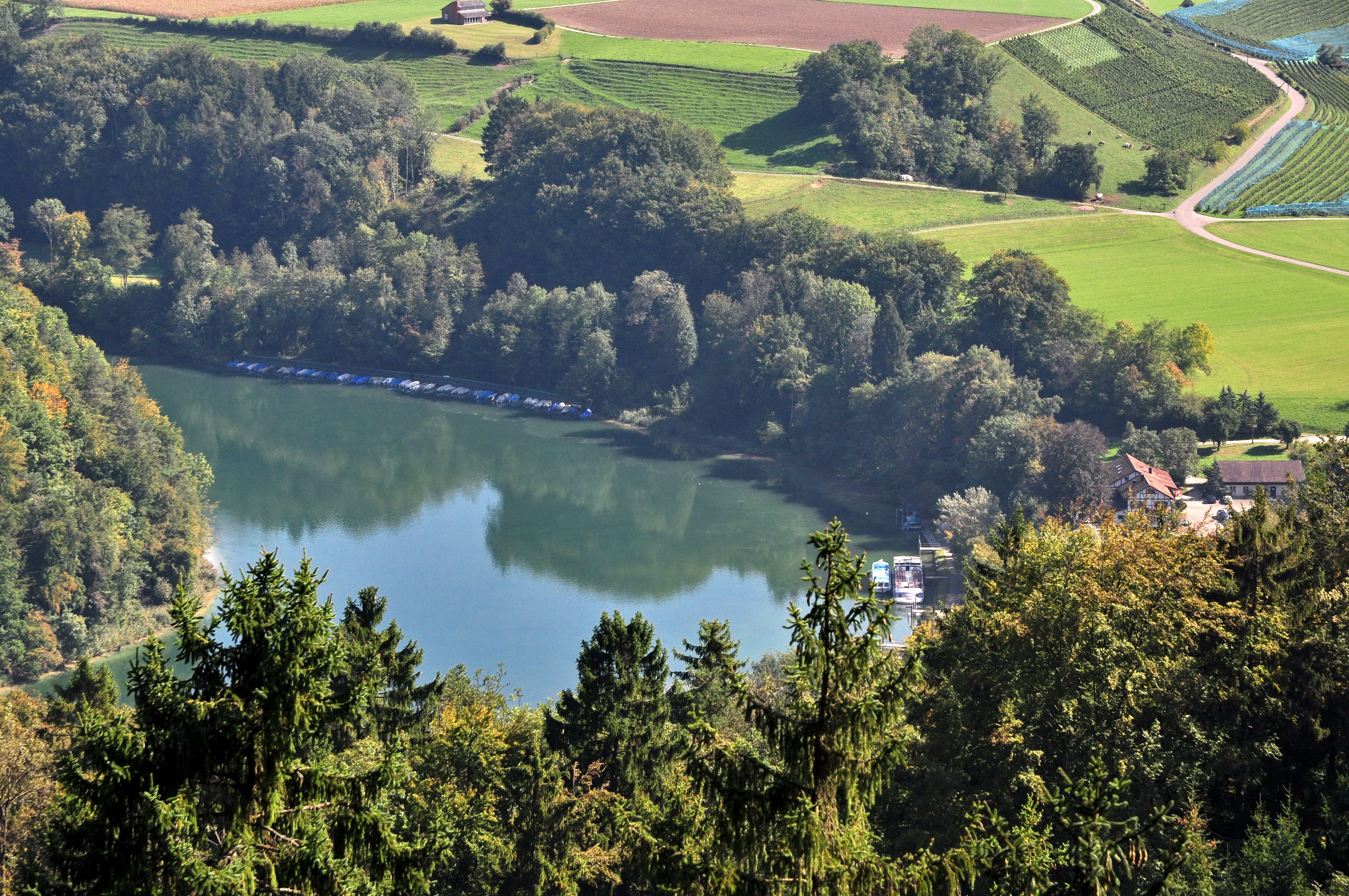
Tössegg, confluence of the Töss (to the left) and Rhine at Freienstein-Teufen

== Geography ==
The valley embraces parts of the Zürcher Oberland including the districts of Hinwil, Pfäffikon and Winterthur, in addition to parts of the Zürcher Unterland (lower Töss valley).

Usually Tösstal is the name of the upper Töss valley, i.e. its narrow, valley-like area in the southeast of the city of Winterthur. The river Töss rises at Tössstock mountain (el. 1,154 m) flows along the valley including the municipalities and villages of Steg, Lipperschwändi and Wellenau (villages of Fischenthal), Bauma, Juckern, Blitterswil, Saland, Tablat, Wila, Turbenthal, Zell, Rikon, Kollbrunn, and Sennhof near Winterthur. The Tösstal is a popular recreation area and well known for hiking tours in the surrounding mountains as Schnebelhorn and Hulftegg pass, and for skating and biking along Töss.

The lower Töss valley includes the widely flattened parts in the west of Winterthur; it compromises the quarters of Winterthur called Töss and Wülflingen, the municipalities Neftenbach, Pfungen, Dättlikon, Embrach, Rorbas, Freienstein and Teufen where the Töss joins the Rhine at Tössegg.

== History ==
First settlement of the upper Töss valley by Celts is considered probable. After the Romans had withdrawn from the area of Winterthur (Vitudurum), the Alemanni advanced into the Töss valley. In the 19th century, water power was the basis of a flourishing textile industry that settled along the course of the river. The poor smallholder population earned money by carving wooden spoons in addition to working in the factories, which earned the region the name Chellenland (Swiss German: Chelle = English: cooking spoon). The water power of the Töss, however, also repeatedly caused flooding and brought much destruction to the region.

In 1876, the Töss Valley Railway was completed, connecting the cities of Winterthur and Rapperswil. The driving force behind its realisation was the Swiss railway builder Adolf Guyer-Zeller, who also initiated the construction of the Jungfrau Railway. Until 1956, the steam railway was one of the last still in operation in Switzerland; to this day, the Dampfbahn-Verein Zürcher Oberland still runs steam locomotives on the Hinwil-Bauma line.

== Transportation ==
The Tösstalstrasse (motorway) was built in 1837, the Tösstalbahn (S26) opened in 1872/76.

== Literature ==
- Hans Bernhard: Wirtschafts- und Siedelungsgeographie des Tösstales. In: Jahresberichte der Geographisch-Ethnographischen Gesellschaft in Zürich, Vol. 11, 1910-1911 (Digitalisat)
- Kurt Hutter et al.: Das Tösstal. Birkenhalde Verlag, 2007. ISBN 978-3-905172-49-2.
