= Pfungen railway station =

Railway station in Switzerland

Pfungen
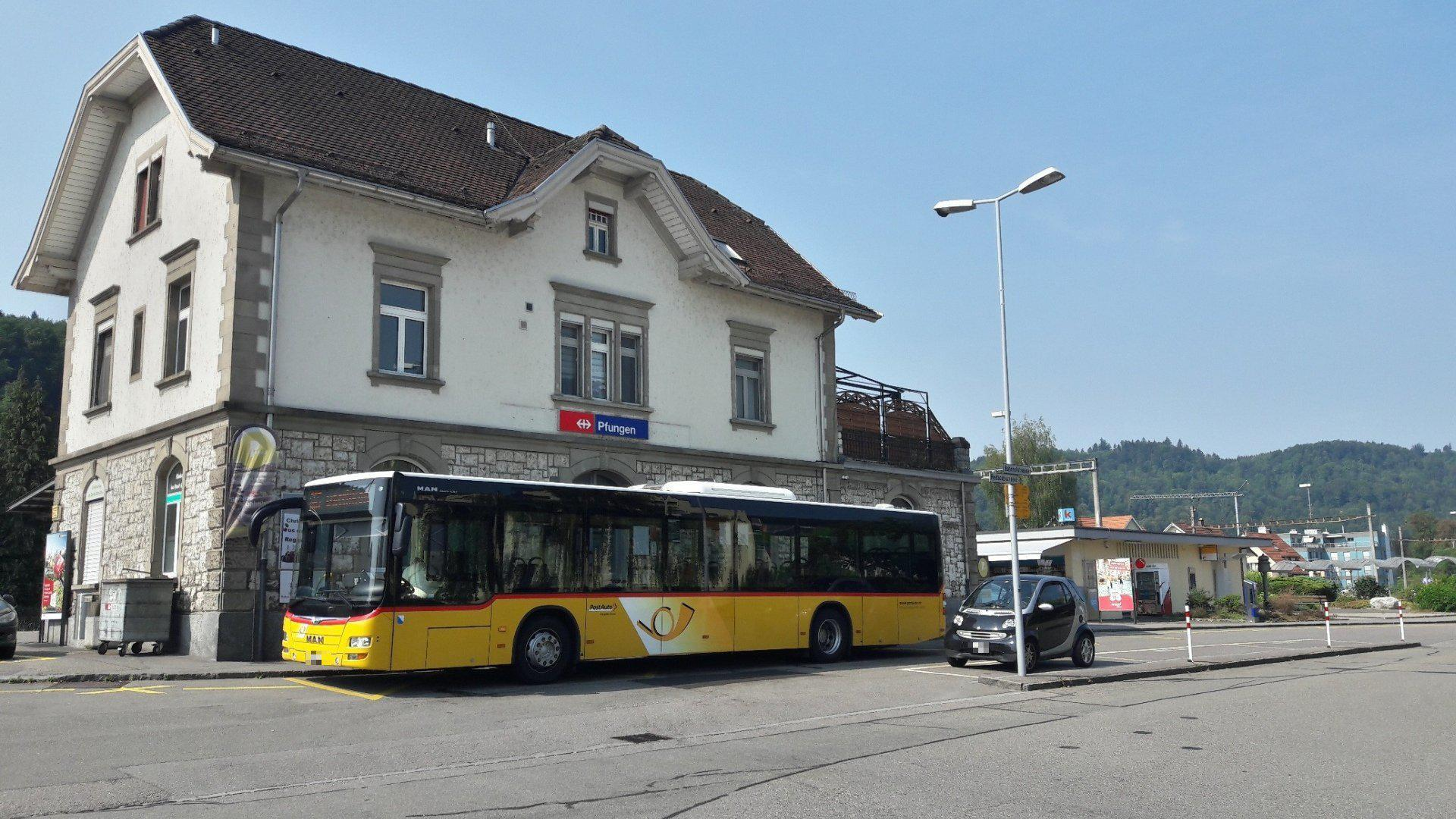
- The station in 2018

General information
- Location: Bahnhofstrasse; Pfungen, Zurich; Switzerland
- Coordinates: 47.515983°N 8.646294°E
- Elevation: 412 m (1,352 ft)
- Owner: Swiss Federal Railways
- Operator: Thurbo
- Line: Winterthur–Bülach–Koblenz
- Connections: Zurich Transport Network (ZVV)
- Bus: PostAuto line 529; Stadtbus Winterthur line 674

Other information
- Fare zone: 123 (ZVV)

History
- Former names: Pfungen-Neftenbach

Services
| Preceding station | Zurich S-Bahn | Following station |
|---|---|---|
| Embrach-Rorbas towards Bülach | S41 | Winterthur Wülflingen towards Winterthur |
| Embrach-Rorbas towards Bülach | SN41 Limited service | Winterthur Wülflingen towards Winterthur |
Location
- Location within Switzerland Location within Canton of Zurich

Pfungen railway station is a railway station in the municipality of Pfungen in the canton of Zurich, Switzerland. Prior to the 2014 timetable change the station was called Pfungen-Neftenbach, but it was shortened as it serves Pfungen and has no connections to Neftenbach. The station lies on the Winterthur to Koblenz line, within fare zone 123 of the Zürcher Verkehrsverbund (ZVV).

== Services ==
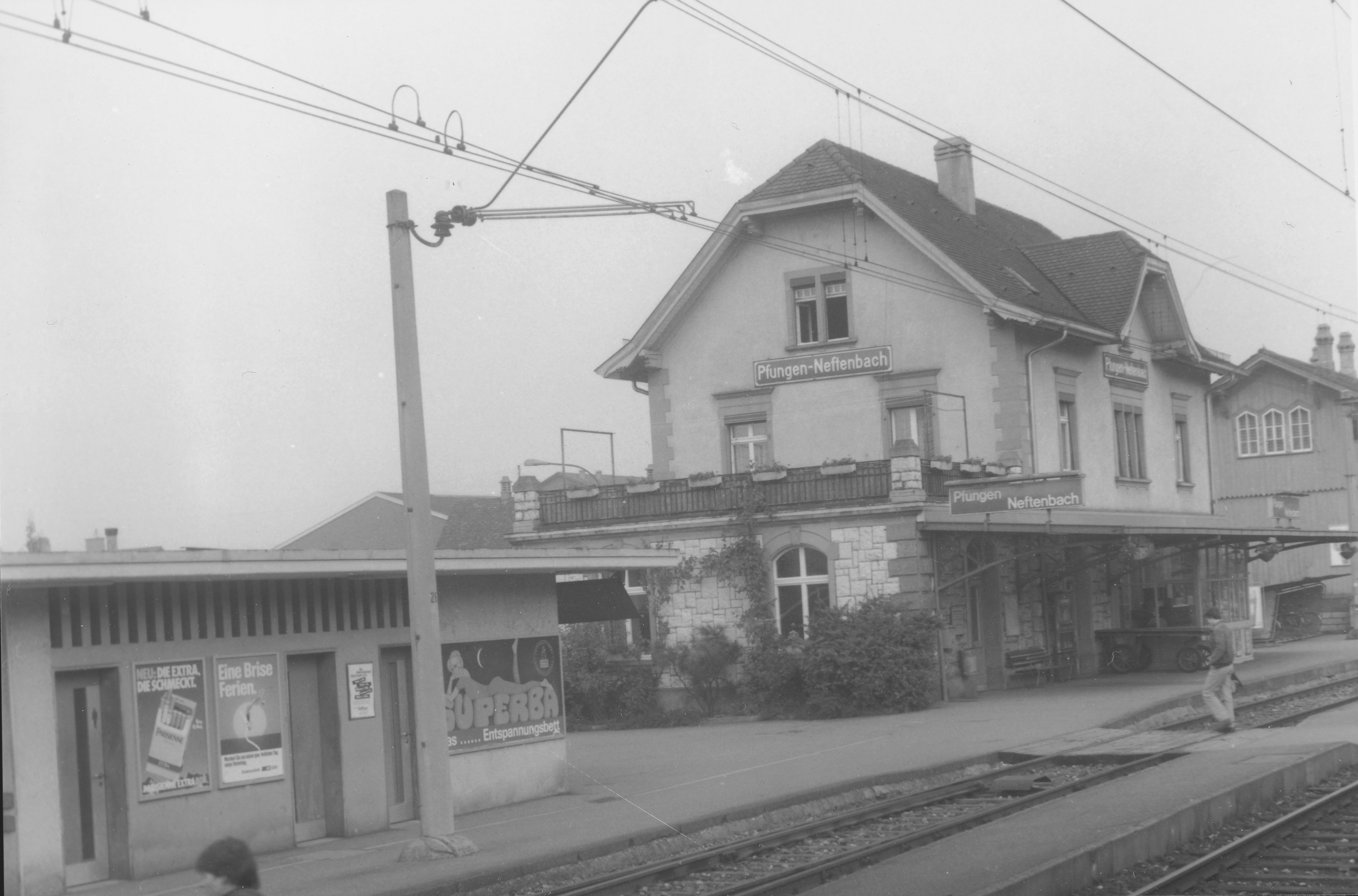
The station in 1963

Pfungen railway station is served by Zurich S-Bahn line S41, which operates between Bülach and Winterthur.

- Zurich S-Bahn S41: half-hourly service to Bülach and Winterthur.

During weekends, there is also a Nighttime S-Bahn service (SN41) offered by ZVV.

- SN41: hourly service to Bülach and Winterthur.

The station is additionally served by buses of PostAuto and Stadtbus Winterthur.

== See also ==
- Rail transport in Switzerland
