= Bülach Observatory =

Sternwarte Bülach
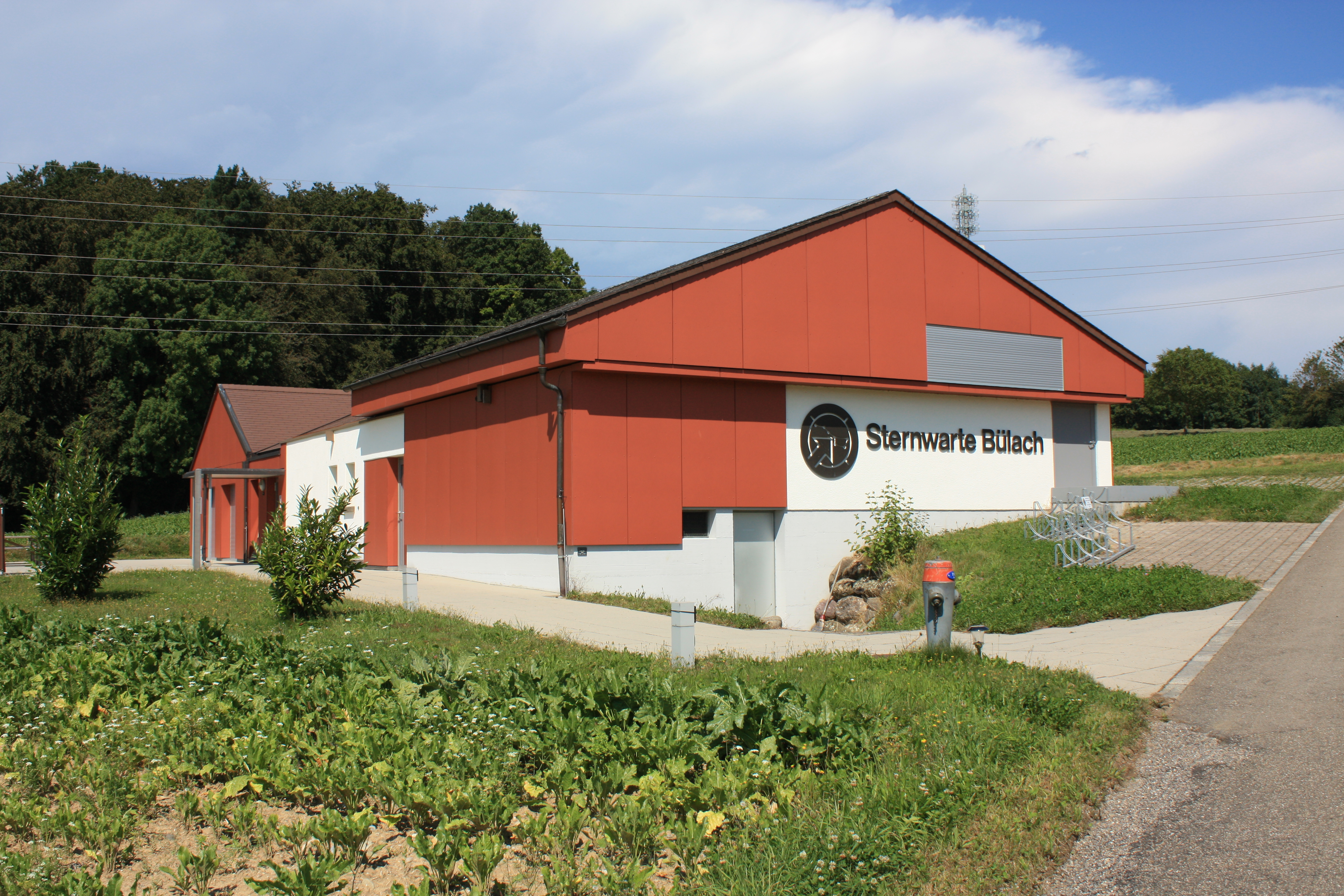
- Alternative names: Sternwarte Bulach
- Organization: Astronomische Gesellschaft Zürcher Unterland
- Observatory code: 167
- Location: Eschenmosen, Bülach, Canton of Zurich, Switzerland
- Coordinates: 47°31.173′N 8°34.239′E
- Altitude: 550 metres (1,800 ft)
- Website: www.sternwartebuelach.ch

Bülach Observatory (German: Sternwarte Bülach) is a public astronomical observatory near Bülach, canton of Zürich, Switzerland.

The observatory provides infrastructure for guided tours, classes and astronomical meetings. At the heart of the spacious roof terrace is the big "twin telescope" with mirror diameters of 85 and 50 cm. The '85 is a pure Cassegrain telescope with a focal length of 7.8 m. The other telescope can be converted from Cassegrain in Newton configuration, the focal length is from 10 to 15 m (Cassegrain) and 2.5 m (Newton). In this arrangement, the Bülacher telescope is unique in Switzerland in its design.

== Foundation School and Public Observatory Bülach ==
The foundation school and public observatory Bülach are in charge of the observatory Bülach. The five-member Board of Trustees holds one annual meeting. The Board of Trustees Gerold Hildebrandt, president of the foundation school and public observatory Bülach Felix Schäpper, Treasurer Thomas Baer, director of education and public observatory Bülach Arnold Benz, Astronomical Institute of the ETH Zurich Felix Angst, Rector Zurich North Canton School (KZN).
