= Dättlikon =

- Municipality
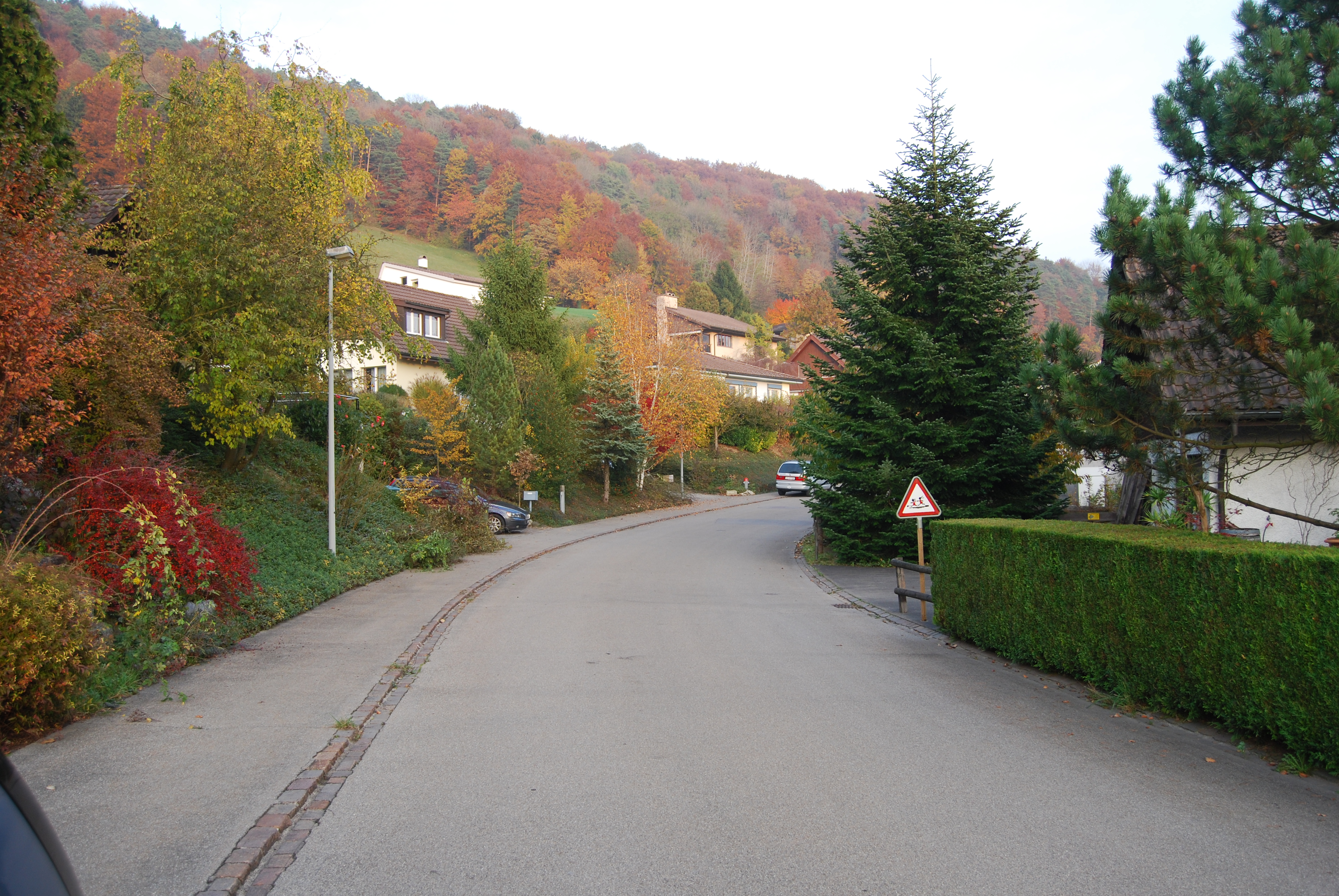

- Flag Coat of arms
- Location of Dättlikon
- Location within Switzerland Location within Canton of Zurich
- Coordinates: 47°31′N 8°38′E
- Country: Switzerland
- Canton: Zurich
- District: Winterthur

Area
  - Total: 2.87 km^{2} (1.11 sq mi)
- Elevation: 386 m (1,266 ft)

Population (December 2020)
  - Total: 797
  - Density: 278/km^{2} (719/sq mi)
- Time zone: UTC+01:00 (CET)
  - Summer (DST): UTC+02:00 (CEST)
- Postal code: 8421
- SFOS number: 215
- ISO 3166 code: CH-ZH
- Surrounded by: Buch am Irchel, Embrach, Freienstein-Teufen, Neftenbach, Pfungen
- Website: www.daettlikon.ch

Dättlikon is a municipality in the district of Winterthur in the canton of Zürich in Switzerland.

== History ==
Dättlikon is first mentioned in 1241 as Tetelinkhoven.

== Geography ==
Dättlikon has an area of 2.9 km^{2} (1.1 sq mi). Of this area, 43% is used for agricultural purposes, while 45.7% is forested. Of the rest of the land, 9.6% is settled (buildings or roads) and the remainder (1.7%) is non-productive (rivers, glaciers or mountains). In 1996 housing and buildings made up 5.6% of the total area, while transportation infrastructure made up the rest (3.8%). Of the total unproductive area, water (streams and lakes) made up 1% of the area. As of 2007 9.6% of the total municipal area was undergoing some type of construction.

The municipality is located on the southern terrace of Irchel evelvation, in the lower Töss Valley. It consists of the village of Dättlikon and the settlement Blumetshalden an der Töss.

== Demographics ==
Dättlikon has a population (as of 31 December 2020) of 797. As of 2007, 7.5% of the population was made up of foreign nationals. As of 2008 the gender distribution of the population was 51.2% male and 48.8% female. Over the last 10 years the population has grown at a rate of 19.6%. Most of the population (as of 2000) speaks German (96.8%), with English being second most common ( 0.8%) and Portuguese being third ( 0.6%).

In the 2007 election the most popular party was the SVP which received 39% of the vote. The next three most popular parties were the SPS (19.1%), the CSP (13.2%) and the FDP (10.5%).

The age distribution of the population (as of 2000) is children and teenagers (0–19 years old) make up 26.1% of the population, while adults (20–64 years old) make up 62.4% and seniors (over 64 years old) make up 11.5%. The entire Swiss population is generally well educated. In Dättlikon about 88.6% of the population (between age 25–64) have completed either non-mandatory upper secondary education or additional higher education (either University or a Fachhochschule). There are 200 households in Dättlikon.

Dättlikon has an unemployment rate of 1.43%. As of 2005, there were 27 people employed in the primary economic sector and about 9 businesses involved in this sector. 39 people are employed in the secondary sector and there are 13 businesses in this sector. 38 people are employed in the tertiary sector, with 11 businesses in this sector. As of 2007 43.8% of the working population were employed full-time, and 56.3% were employed part-time.

As of 2008 there were 128 Catholics and 381 Protestants in Dättlikon. In the 2000 census, religion was broken down into several smaller categories. From the census, 71.6% were some type of Protestant, with 70.1% belonging to the Swiss Reformed Church and 1.5% belonging to other Protestant churches. 18.5% of the population were Catholic. Of the rest of the population, 0% were Muslim, 1.7% belonged to another religion (not listed), 0.4% did not give a religion, and 7.8% were atheist or agnostic.

The historical population is given in the following table:

year	population
1634	156
1850	396
1900	354
1920	409
1930	338
1950	361
2000	529
