= Nico Georgiadis =

Swiss chess grandmaster (born 1996)

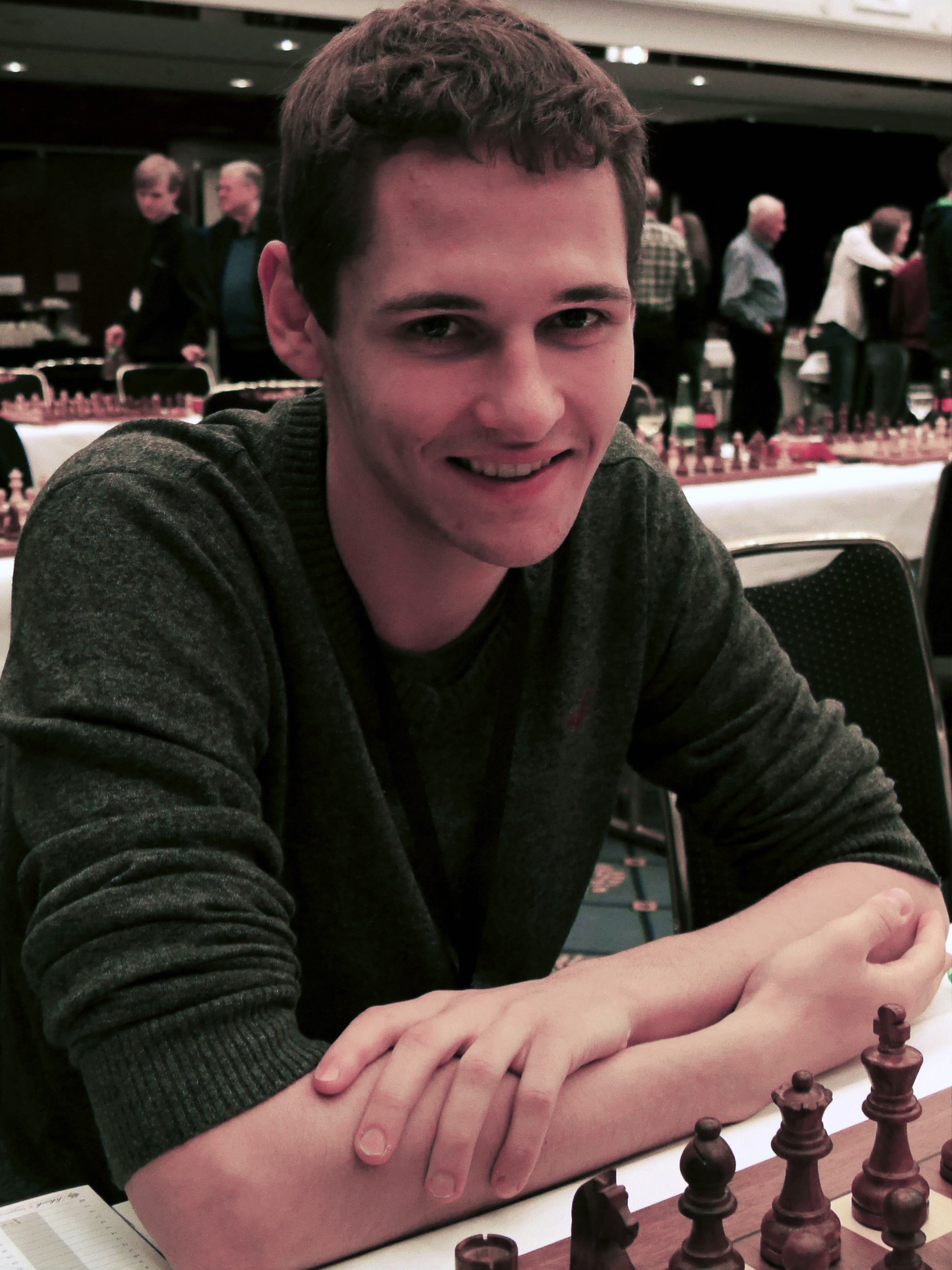
- Nico Georgiadis, 2017

Personal information
- Born: 22 January 1996 (age 30) Bülach, Switzerland

Chess career
- Country: Switzerland
- Title: Grandmaster (2017)
- FIDE rating: 2529 (July 2026)
- Peak rating: 2578 (June 2022)

Nico Georgiadis (born 22 January 1996) is a Swiss chess player. He holds the title of Grandmaster, which FIDE awarded him in 2017.

== Chess career ==
Born in Bülach, Georgiadis earned his international master title in 2013 and his grandmaster title in 2017.
