= Embrach =

- Municipality
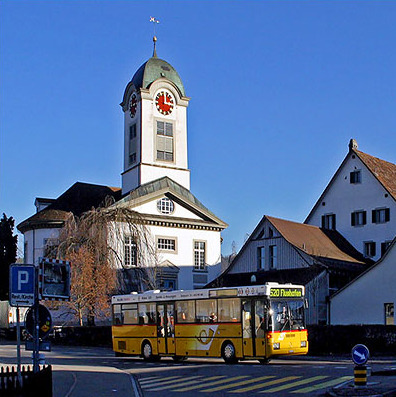

- Flag Coat of arms
- Location of Embrach
- Location within Switzerland Location within Canton of Zürich
- Coordinates: 47°30.63′N 8°35.63′E
- Country: Switzerland
- Canton: Zürich
- District: Bülach

Government
  - Mayor: Erhard Büchi FDP/PRD

Area
  - Total: 12.72 km^{2} (4.91 sq mi)
- Elevation: 428 m (1,404 ft)
- Highest elevation (Tisch on top of Blauen): 609 m (1,998 ft)
- Lowest elevation (Töss): 360 m (1,180 ft)

Population (December 2020)
  - Total: 9,610
  - Density: 756/km^{2} (1,960/sq mi)
- Time zone: UTC+01:00 (CET)
  - Summer (DST): UTC+02:00 (CEST)
- Postal code: 8424
- SFOS number: 56
- ISO 3166 code: CH-ZH
- Surrounded by: Bülach, Dättlikon, Freienstein-Teufen, Lufingen, Oberembrach, Pfungen, Rorbas, Winkel
- Website: www.embrach.ch

Embrach is a municipality in the district of Bülach in the canton of Zürich in Switzerland.

== Coat of arms ==
Blazon

Gules, two keys argent in saltire. Until the middle of the 16th century seals with the image of St. Peter were used. Today's St. Peter's keys are a reference to this tradition. The change was made to the secular symbol due to the Reformation (iconoclasm).

== Geography ==
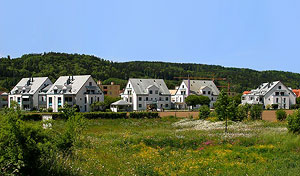
Residential area "Im Grund" in summertime

Embrach is situated in the "Embrachertal" (Embrach Valley), 6 kilometers northeast of the international airport of Zurich, in a wide U-shaped side valley of the river Töss. A plain of 500 ha size, 5 km length and up to 1.5 km width forms the ground of the valley. The plain is bounded by the slopes of the hill Blauen to the east, by the hill Dättenberg to the west, by the Ghei and the Egg to the south, and by the Tössschlucht (canyon of river Töss) to the north. The stream Wildbach drains the "Embrachertal" northwards into the river Töss at Rorbas. The landscape was formed by the Linth glacier during the ice-age.

Out of the total 12.72 square kilometers of Embrach, 45% account for forests, 35% for arable land and 18% for settlement area plus roads. The portion of the settlement area is steadily increasing by more than 30 ha per year at the expense of the cultivated area. [3].

The village stretches mainly along the main street from the "Hinterdorf" in the south to the Psychiatric Center Hard in the north. Embrach is a 3 km long so-called "Street Village" (Strassendorf in German). The best living areas are on the slopes of Sonnenberg and Guldenberg in the east of the village. Since the Middle Ages, grape vines have been grown on these slopes.

The highest point is the "Tisch" (table) on top of the hill "Blauen" at 609 meters above sea level. 688897 / 263243. The deepest point is in the river "Töss" in west of the "Kleinwasserkraftwerks Freienstein" at 360 meters above sea level. 686459 / 264803. The village center with the Reformed Church is located at 428 meters above sea level, approximately 6 km northeast of the international airport of Zurich. The geographical center we find "Im Grund" southwest of "Badi Talegg" (municipal swimming pool). 687307 / 262610. The northernmost point is the river "Töss" north of the farm "Neumoos" 686703 / 264944. The easternmost point is situated on the road Oberembrach - Pfungen at the junction to the farm Freienhof. 689816 / 261984. The southernmost point, we find on the northwest edge of the "Multikomponentendeponie Zürcher Unterland (DEZU)" - a landfill site for construction waste. 686071 / 260639. The westernmost point is at the forest edge in the "Plattenwiese" close to the road Embrach - Winkel. 685077 / 261482.

== Population ==
Embrach has a population (as of 31 December 2020) of 9,610.

Historical population

Year	Pop.	±% p.a.
1850	1,429	—
1900	1,581	+0.20%
1920	1,647	+0.20%

Year	Pop.	±% p.a.
1940	1,825	+0.51%
1960	2,201	+0.94%
1980	5,766	+4.93%

Year	Pop.	±% p.a.
1990	6,851	+1.74%
2000	7,380	+0.75%
2007	8,577	+2.17%

- Foreigners 2007: 21%
- Confessions 2000: Protestant 43%, Catholic 31%, Without a Religion 14%, Other 9%

== Economy ==
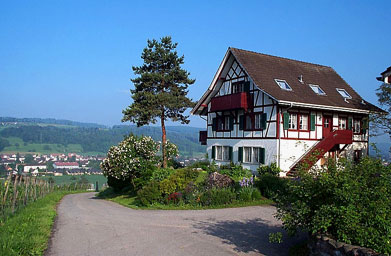
Winery on "Guldenberg"

There are 3,044 households in Embrach. The population density is 675 people per one square kilometer. More than every second inhabitant (56%) of Embrach owns a car. Embrach provides 3,500 jobs, of which 30% are part-time jobs. The service sector has a share of just 75%, the manufacturing sector and the industry nearly 25% and the remainder is distributed to 24 farms. Trade and maintenance hold more than 25%, transport 20% (mainly companies in Embraport), the health and social services 18% (Psychiatrie-Zentrum Hard, nursing home, medical), manufacturing 17%, real estate, computer science, management, education 11%, construction 7%. A total of 4,500 Embrach citizens are employed. A family home in the best location, could cost 1 million CHF, with land prices of up to 600 CHF per square meter. Rental for a 4-room apartment is 1,400 – 2,100 CHF per month.
In Embrach 58 hotel beds are available. You can relax in one of the 12 Restaurants in town for anyone who does not eat at home. There are also four grocery stores in the village.

=== Education ===
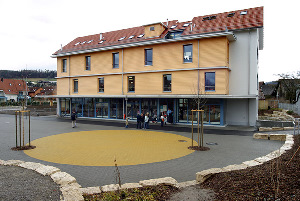
Primary school Embrach Dorf

The powerful Schulpflege (school board) is responsible for the proper fulfillments of all tasks in the primary school education. It is primarily operative at the strategic level. A school board is responsible for the operational tasks. The board provides educational, personnel and administrative management within the framework of their delegated powers. It supports and advises the Schulpflege in all aspects of the school. The school has a kindergarten, primary and secondary school structure. In Embrach 1,600 students are taught at different locations. Three main locations are in the Schoolhouse Dorf, Hungerbühl and Ebnet. In addition there are several grass pitches and gym halls available. Gymnasiums providing secondary education are in Bülach, Winterthur and Zürich. Nearby higher education can be found at universities in Winterthur and Zürich.

=== Industrial history ===
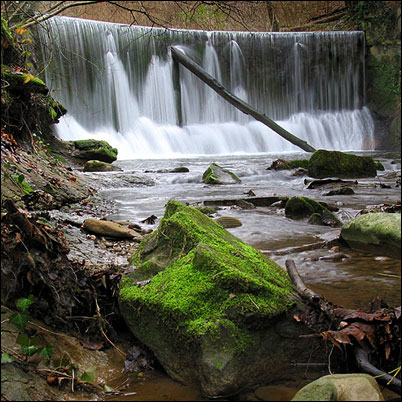
Waterfall, near Haumühle

Textile Industry The opening of the silk factory Seidenzwirnerei Zinggeler in 1871, is regarded as the first industrial enterprise of Embrach. In 1988 the building was demolished and converted to a parking lot for the Reformed Church. What remains is the "Chlostergumpen" (a nature reserve with local significance), the water reservoir of the former silk factory. The valley became home to countless spinners and weavers. The Spirella Company can be regarded as the last heir of these traditional factories. In Embrach factory shower curtains for the world are still produced. Since 1987 all other companies have gone.

Pottery industry Pioneer in the field of pottery is the brick factory "Ziegelhütte", west of the "Hard" forest on the road to "Pfungen". Their history goes back to the Middle Ages. Ofenganz, Klinker Ganz, Steinzeuffabrik, Töferei Zangger Neri, led this tradition and produced until 1980. Today, they trade only with pottery goods or have been dissolved. Only the pottery Landert still produces in Embrach.

Machine industry Since the Middle Ages there were blacksmiths in town, they provided the farmers with tools, and later with machines for crops. Over time, other companies were established, such as Meili weapons, until 1914, Bölsterli Setma Electric Motors, Zwinggi, washing machines, hydro plants, milling machinery, Karl Keller, Precision Engineering, Krebser Kehrli, medical instruments, Oskar Diener medical instrument and precision mechanics. See also: Abraham Ganz

Communications Telecommunications arrived in the form of the telegraph to Embrach in 1872. 23 years later, the first telephone was installed and since 1992, three mobile phone networks provide services to the inhabitants of the valley. There are several providers for the broadband Internet and digital television. One problem is the analog radio receiver - despite various attempts, the reception from the Zürich area has failed to improve, including the last project on the Sonnenberg.

=== Resources ===
Silica sand for glass in Bülach has long been promoted in Embrach, there was even a mine on the hillside to the east of the Village. The underground of Embrach is rich in gravel, a big part of it is already degraded. From the 9th century already, hydropower was used from Illinger mill. From the mid 19th century many other industry combined to make use of a large number of old water reservoirs in the valley. Today the Haumühle again turns a waterwheel. Since 2004, a small power plant on the Töss River produces power for up to 1000 people.

== Traffic and transport ==
=== Medieval trade ===
The route Kloten - Embrach - Andelfingen was part of a medieval trade route from southern Germany. The route went from Stein am Rhein on to Stammheim, Andelfingen, Pfungen, Embrach after Kloten, thence to Baden, then to Geneva and Lyon to the fairs. The records of duty in Kloten show that the products mainly transported were wine, iron, salt, linen, fruits and spices. The path in the early maps is shown as a dirt road, noted only as a (Saumpfad) horse track.

=== Modern road construction ===
The bridge over the Töss 1838 in Bruni, now Tössallmend Neftenbach, made this river transitional weather independent. This cleared the way for the road Pfungen - Embrach - Rorbas. A stone bridge over the river at Rorbas was built in 1840. The "Kohlenschwärze" (the slippery moist forest on the northern slope of the Blauen over the Töss River) is a geological, hydrological problem area since the Middle Ages, always leading to file entries. The road there could only be completed by 1850. Towards the south, the route Embrach - Lufingen - Kloten was built 1841 to 1850. In the north from 1842 to 1843, the road piece Rorbas - Wagenbrechi - Chrützstrass - Glattfelden was accomplished. From 1858, the route Embrach Dreispitz - Eschenberg - Bülach, with gentle climbs passable throughout the year, was finished. Earlier connections to Bülach were steep, unpaved mule tracks in wretched condition. The road Embrach - Nürensdorf was completed in 1864. These new roads and bridges were built based on a French model with solid groundwork over 5 meters in width. The surface consists of gravel, some asphalt. These roads and bridges withstood the pressures and the volume of modern traffic until 1970. Since 1905 the streets of Embrach are electrically illuminated.

=== From stagecoach to Zurich transport network ===
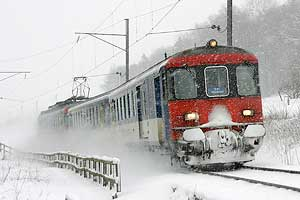
The old S41 train; now a new light Thurbo is in service

A mail- and stagecoach on the route Rorbas - Embrach - Kloten ran from 1862 for 20 years. The Schweizerische Nordostbahn (NOB - Director Alfred Escher) received a concession in 1870 for the construction of the railway line "Winterthur - Embrach - Bülach - Koblenz". Start of construction was 1874 and there were an average of 1400 workers, 225 trolleys, and 60 horses used. Most of the workers came from Italy. A railway bridge (metal) near the Haumühle spanned the Wildbach in 1875. It was newly built in 1950 as a stone arch bridge. The Dättenberg was drilled through on 23 October 1875. The tunnel and the whole line opened in 1876. The settlement area Embrach developed as a consequence in a northerly direction. The SBB took over the NOB in 1902.

The first bus line was licensed to operate on the route Rorbas - Freinstein - Embrach - Kloten from 1932. From 1942 the PTT ran the line from Teufen. Today, the ZVV line 520 operates from Teufen - Freienstein - Rorbas - Embrach - to the airport Zürich Kloten. The Zürcher Verkehrsverbund (ZVV) since 1990 optimizes the connections with S-Bahn and bus lines. Embrach is connected every half-hour to the cities Bülach (5 minutes), Kloten (10 minutes), Winterthur (20 minutes) and Zürich (35 minutes).

=== The future a highway? ===
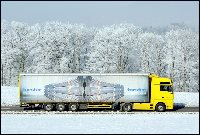
Truck traffic in Embrach

The biggest problem of the community is the private transport. According to a survey of the Canton (2007) each workday up to 17,000 motor vehicles pass through the main road in Embrach. Already in the construction zone regulations of 1953 and 1962 (Bau- und Zonenordnung Embrach 1953 und 1962), a north and east bypass were scheduled. In 1976, a small part of northern bypass was built, but a continuation through the Dättenberg could not be realized until now. In the traffic plan of 26 March 2007 a highway is planned that would connect Bülach and Winterthur (part of the outer north bypass of Zurich). Alternatives to this four-lane highway, also in the above plan, are back once again an east bypass Embraport - Lufingen and a tunnel through the Dättenberg to Bachenbülach. The money for both projects is not in sight.

== Railway ==
Embrach-Rorbas railway station is served by Zurich S-Bahn line S41, which links Winterthur and Waldshut.

== History ==
=== Beginnings ===
First traces of settlement are grave finds from the Bronze Age around 800 BC at Ofengupf in Oberembrach. Many Roman settlements are documented in the catchment area of Embrach valley. In the valley itself there are few traces of the Romans, documented are only a few coins and shards finds. One this is sure and that is that the name Embrach is of Gallo-Roman origin. Imbriacus (first written down in 1044 as Imbriaguam), from Imbri (rain) Acus (field), so fields of rain. Or Imbrex (Roman brick) Acus, so the fields of Brickmaker. The second option fits so nicely for the further history of the place ...

=== Middle Ages, with written documents ===
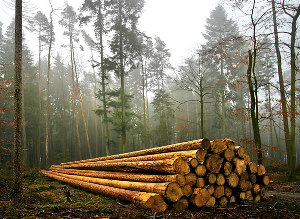
Timber in the forest "Hüeneren

An Alamanni population is first mentioned around 750. In 820 we find a record to the hamlet and mill of Illingen as estate of the cathedral (Grossmünster) in Zurich. The mill is clearly a sign of extensive agriculture in Embrach Valley at this time. The foundations of the first monastery of the 9th century were first laid open during excavations in 1992, radiocarbon dated. The Hunfried certificate mentioned Embrach for the first time in written form in 1044. The secular power is in the wake of the Toggenburger. Heidegger (they have a tavern right in Embrach) and Bochsler were Embrach nobleman in the 14th century. In the War of Sempach (Sempacherkrieg) (1386) and later in the Old Zurich War (1444) the troops of the Eidgenossen plundered, destroyed the church and the convent.

After this war the governmental power over Embrach chances from the House of Habsburg to the state of Zurich. A Latin school in the Abbey at 1454 is documented. At the turn of the century the population is growing strongly. The consequences are massive inflation, wages collapse and widespread poverty. It follows that what we today would call economic development program. Wine and wood use will be encouraged to adopt taxes. The vineyard employs more people than arable economy. Grubbing enlarges the area, but lead to legal uncertainty, which at the time is record to Embrach.

=== From the Reformation to the Civil Community ===
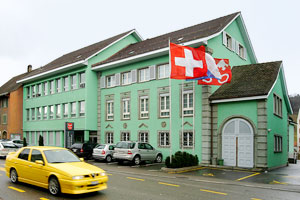
The green town hall

Heinrich Brennwald (1478–1551, author of a four Swiss Chronicle books) enters 1518 as the last provost of the Monastery of Embrach. The Monastery was under Brennwald 1524 in the wake of the Zurich Reformation secularized. Embrach is now reformed. A gradual migration stop imported from 1556 aims to prevent economic collapse. In 1547 the first appearance of today's municipal coat of arms with two crossed keys of Saint Peter. With the reformation of Zwingli, more and more in children's education is invested. Classes are held in the parish office of the inn, and from 1740 in Journeyman house of 1522. An extremely long cold winter 1571 caused a massive inflation (partly 1000%) in food and soil. Zurich approved the pledge of the municipality of large parts of the community property. One fifth of the population will shift to poverty. A local 1715 hail storm devastated the village. A large sum of donations from around the region and Zurich comes to repairing the damage together. The repairs take up to three years. The autumn storms in 1739 laid the forest in the "Hardwald" flat, the economic loss to the community is tremendous. And there is no better. An earthquake shook Embrach in 1778, the church from 1446 collapses. The building was never really stable; it was constantly renewed and patched. Even before the major political upheavals at the turn of the century, in 1780 a new church was completed. It is up to now used transverse oval church by David Vogel.

=== Age of Enlightenment ===
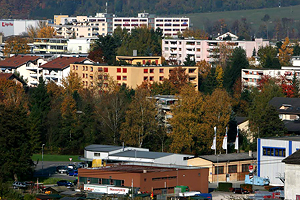
Residential area "Im Feld"

Aerial view by Walter Mittelholzer (1923)

In 1799 up to 40,000 Austrians and French military man are in the valley of Embrach. The damage will be at 28 million CHF (converted to current conditions) is estimated. The founding of Canton of Zurich in 1803 by Napoleon (Mediation Constitution). 1809 Oberembrach achieved independence. in the consequence Embrach was called Unterembrach until 1931. The first cantonal referendum on 10 March 1831 takes place. The liberal constitution based on the "Memorials von Uster" was debatable and adopted. As a result, a huge political and economic grow was achieved. Modern roads (1838–1964) and railroads (1874–1876) are built, communication services are launched (1850), school houses are constructed and health services are established. The administrative centre for the area at the Amtshaus Embrach was moved in 1831 to the Bülach district administration. On Easter Tuesday 1856 Eduard Gotthard Engel is a murder victim of a robbery. Already 14 days later, the two perpetrators, the well-known day labourers Jakob Bosshard and Jakob Reinberger, are beheaded with the guillotine in Zurich. Thousands of onlookers were witnesses. This was one of the last civilian executions in the Canton of Zurich.

=== Up to the present ===
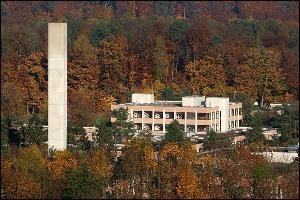
Psychiatrie-Zentrum Hard (PZH)

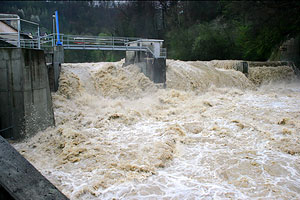
Hydroelectric power station

For a long time the industry in the Embrach valley produced electric energy from local hydropower using various small ponds. These water reservoirs are today still found on both sides of the Embrach Valley slopes. That changed in 1904 when the power plant was established. A year later the streets were electrically illuminated. In 1934 a swimming pool, the Chlostergumpen, with diving tower was built. Total land amelioration was made 1963–65; not everyone was satisfied with the result.
Due to its favourable geographical location near Winterthur Bülach Zurich and in particular the Zurich Airport Embrach was in 1960–1965 a fast-growing community. The Swissair built an entire residential district on Dreispitz for its employees. East of the village, family homes at a prime location on the Sonnenberg emerged. In "Im Feld" modest apartment buildings were built.
Since 1965 a controversial shooting range for hunters has existed at the Au, very close to the Töss River. In 1972 an indoor and outdoor swimming pool was built, the present "Badi Talegg", which was renewed and expanded 2004-2005. A big change took place in 1972 when a huge construction site was started on the northern edge of Embrach. The duty-free Embraport site opened its doors in 1973.
After long planning starting 1918 (from 1945 on the location Embrach was in conversation), the third Psychiatric Clinic of the Canton of Zurich on the Hard in Embrach was opened in 1974. In the area too, a transit centre for asylum seekers has been running since 1989. The Psychiatrie-Zentrum Hard (PZH) and the Integrierte Psychiatrie Winterthur (ipw) merged in January 2010. Maybe this Embrach intuition will come to an end in the near future. The municipalities of Embrach Valley operate a retirement home for up to 100 elderly people since 1982 (after enlargement in 2010).
Hurricane Lothar (gusts to 270 kilometres per hour)in 1999 devastated large areas of municipal and private forest.
In 2004 the hydroelectric power station at the Töss River was modernized. The output is 2,000,000 kWh per year, which covers the electricity needs of about 1000 people in the Canton of Zurich. The EW Embrach is responsible for the operation.

== Politics ==
=== Party strength ===
Embrach

Zurich state council elections in %	1926	1939	1947	1959	1967	1979	1987	1999	2007
SVP	44.5	49.6	33.6	30.8	16.2	28.3	26.2	39.7	42.8
SP	31.3	16.8	35.2	29.4	35.5	27.3	17.2	18.1	17.5
FDP	15.6	10.1	10.7	17.8	23	16.0	16.4	12.8	9.3
Grüne	-	-	-	-	-	-	12.2	3.4	7.7
CVP	7.2	3.3	5.2	6.7	5.8	7.4	5.3	7.3	8.3
LDU from 2007 GLP	-	8.6	4.7	6.6	11.1	7.3	5.2	1.9	5.2
EVP	-	10.6	9.7	8.7	8.4	9.6	6.4	3.8	4.5

=== Municipal Council ===
(7 Members, status 2016)

- Mayor, Erhard Büchi, FDP
- Deputy mayor/Chairman of the maintenance and security board, Heiner Vögeli, SVP
- Chairman of the primary school supervisory board, Philipp Baumgartner
- Chairman of the social board, Regula Bächi-Seiler, FDP
- Chairman of the planning and constructing board, Rebekka Bernhardsgrütter
- Chairman of the real estate board, Hans Dietrich, CVP
- Chairman of the public health board, Peter Hunziker, SP

=== Personalities ===
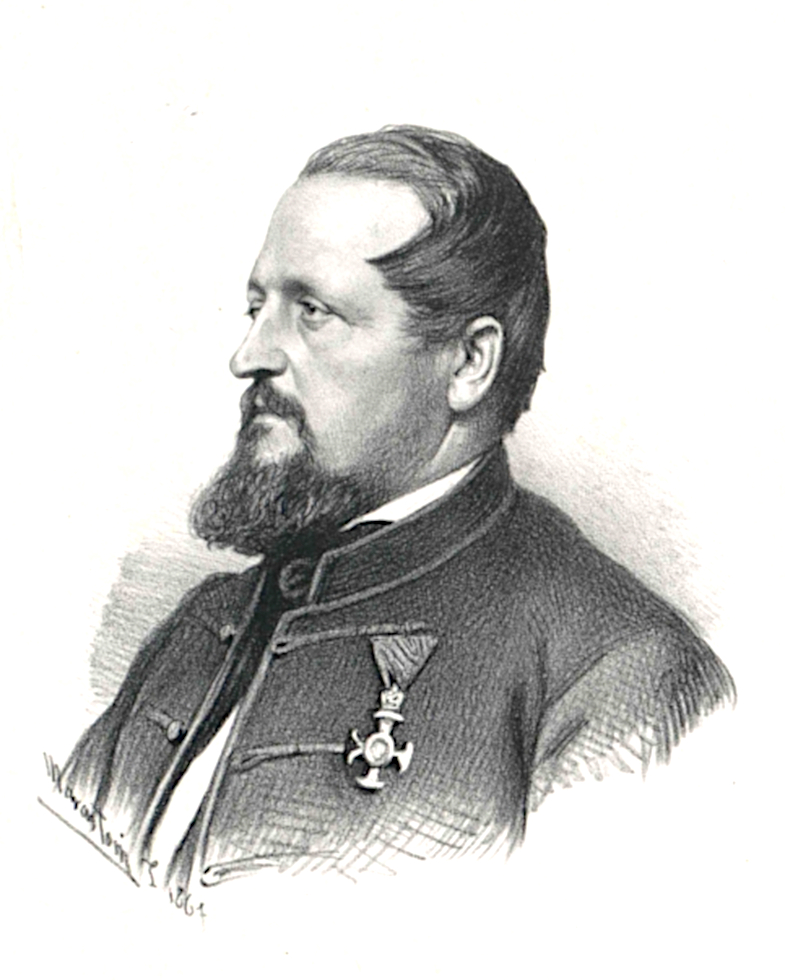
Abraham Ganz

- Ábrahám Ganz (*1814 in Unter-Embrach, 1867† in Budapest, Hungary) Swiss-born Hungarian industry pioneer, founder of the Ganz Works.
- Otmar Blumer (*1848 in Glarus, 1900† in Unter-Embrach) Cotton manufacturer, member of the council of states (Ständerat), member of the Zurich state council, Colonel Brigadier of the Swiss cavalry.
- Karl Kolb (*1889 in Hörhausen, Thurgau) Veterinarian, 48 years board member of Embrach primary school, 24 years Mayor, Swiss army Colonel in war time.
- Fritz Ganz (*1916 in Neftenbach – 1992† in Embrach) Electrician, professional cyclist, board member of "EWZ" und "NOK", unionist, 16 years chairman of Embrach primary school, chairman of the retirement home commission, board member of KZU, mayor, member of the Zurich state council, chairman of the state national council, member of the national council.

== Culture and Leisure ==
=== Artists ===
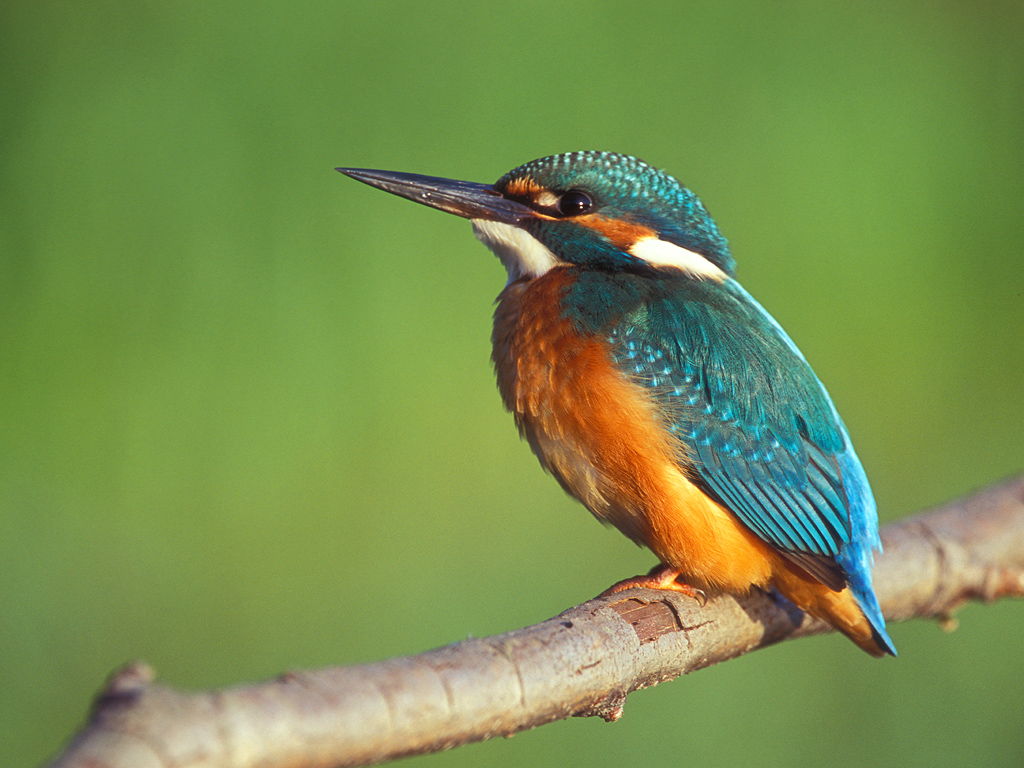
Kingfisher near "Haumühle"

Hedwig Neri
Hedwig Neri (*1914 in Embrach – 1997† in Embrach) The ceramic and faience painter Hedwig Zangger Neri worked from 1945 in addition to clay, with glass, textiles, oil paint and pencil. An example is the picture from Murano glass in the abdication hall. Not far away, in the old Amtshaus, live and act the Neris. The house is a place of culture and attracts many artists. Ruedi Walter, Inigo Gallo and Margrit Rainer are frequent guests. Today in the year 2008, Nicola Di Capua, and the soprano Gabriela Bergallo scepter in history Amtshaus.

Bella Neri
Bella Neri (*1942 in Embrach) is the daughter of Hedwig Neri. Bella Neri studied in Zurich to be an actress and made a career with the Federal theater, in film and television. She works with Margrit Rainer, Ruedi Walter, Stephanie Glaser, Walter Roderer and many more. The next stage of Bella Neri's activity will be with productions of all kinds for children.

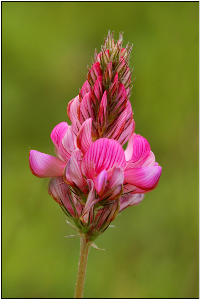
Natur in Embrach

Alain Garnier
Alain Garnier (*1926 in Blois, Frankreich - 2005† in Embrach) Resistance, studied at the École des Beaux-Arts in Paris. Painter, ceramist, sculptor in metal.
One of his early works is the stage setting for Jean-Paul Sartre's drama "Les mouches" in theater "Le vieux Colombier. The meeting with Picasso 1947 influenced his work, he turned to the ceramic designer and later in "Rosenthal". Garnier moved to Switzerland in 1972 and 1980 after Embrach, where he worked in the Obermühle a ceramic workshop and gallery in the brick hut in a metal workshop operates. The fountain in front of the Post and the iron sculpture in front of the village schoolhouse come from him. A tragic accident cost him his life in 2005.

Arthur Woods
The Swiss American Artist Arthur Woods (*1948 in Talaquah, Oklahoma, USA) lived 1981 - 2005 in Embrach. In this time various Space Art projects. The Cosmic Dancer from Arthur Woods visits on 22 May 1993 the Russian Mir space station. It is the reduction of plastic from the year 1986, up to now in the residential area "Im Grund" is. Arthur's large oil paintings often show motives from the Embrach environment, for example the picture "Sonntagsspaziergang" (Sunday Walk) in the parish house. Today Artur Woods has an art gallery in Stein am Rhein.

David Thayer

The Swiss-American Artist lives in Embrach since 2007 and has produced 2 Albums with his Band "Little Tornadoes" since. He also made many Films including: Bigfoot: A Beast on the run, Verbotene Sprache and a documentary about the city of Bogota.

=== Attractions ===
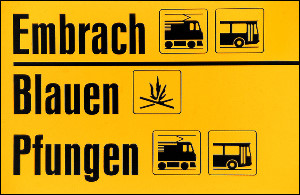
Hiking trail

- Töss river canyon near "Bindensteg". From the bridge (Bindensteg) to the power plant in Freienstein the Töss canyon is a protected zone of national importance.
- Haumühle with historical sawmill and flour mill driven by large water wheels. In addition, the area around the mill is a nature reserve of regional exploitation. With rare plants and birds like the Kingfisher. The creek wedges here through a small gorge before it plunges over a waterfall, and leads at Rorbas in the Töss river.
- There is a view point to the Embrachertal and the Alps from the top of Forenirchel. There are footpaths from the Castle Teufen, Dättlikon or Freienstein.

=== Leisure ===
- "Badi Talegg" with indoor pool swimming, whirlpool, outdoor swimming pool surrounded by trees and a Finnish sauna.
- Walking around on the "Blauen", forest trail. From parking at the "Warpel" easily accessible.
- Walking from Oberembrach to Rorbas longitudinally through the town, all along the creek. Grilling spots can be found at the Haumühle, wood is ready for use.
- Walk on the Dättenberg from Augwil to Tössegg. Various opportunities for grilling. Postal Bus Station at start "Hinter Marcheln" and near the end in Teufen (just 10 minutes above Tössegg) in Teufen.

== Photos ==
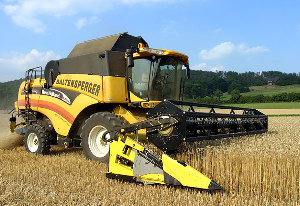
Harvester on Embrach cornfields

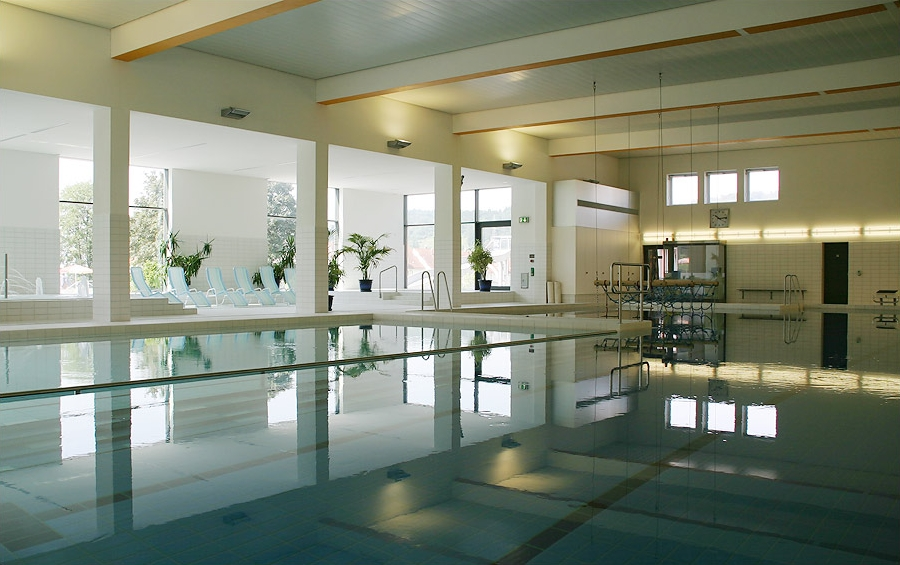
Swimming pool "Badi Talegg"

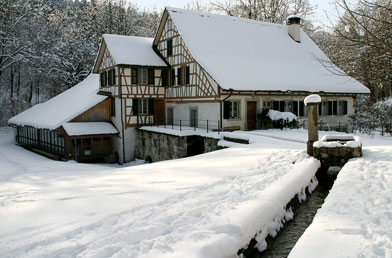
The ancient saw and flour mill "Haumühle"

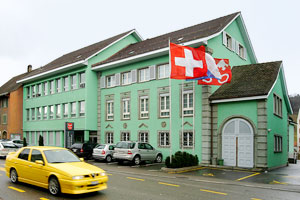
The green town hall

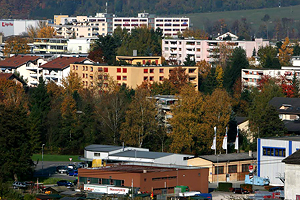
Residential area "Im Feld"

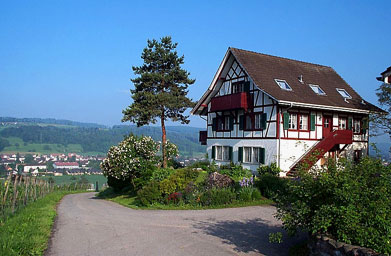
Winery "Guldenberg"

== Literature ==
All in German:

- Baer Hans, 200 Jahre "neue" Kirche Embrach. Ein Beitrag zur Baugeschichte der reformierten Kirche Embrach. 1980.
- Baer Hans, Legenden und Sagen aus dem Embrachertal. Lesegesellschaft Bülach, 1981
- Baer Hans, Geschichte der Gemeinde Embrach Band 1. Von den Anfängen bis zur Französischen Revolution. Kulturkommission Embrach, 1994.
- Baer Hans, Embracher Laufbrunnen. Kulturkommission Embrach, 1996
- Wiggenhauser Béatrice, Klerikale Karrieren: Das ländliche Chorherrenstift Embrach und seine Mitglieder im Mittelalter. 1997. ISBN 3-905312-45-X
- Stromer Markus, Geschichte der Gemeinde Embrach. Band 2: Das 19. und 20. Jahrhundert. 1999.
- Baer Hans, Embrach – einst und jetzt. Kulturkommission Embrach, 2001
- Baer Hans: Seidenzwirnerei Zinggeler, Embrach; zur Geschichte eines verschwundenen Zeitzeugen der Textilindustrie; Kulturkommission Embrach 2009
- Baer Hans: Tonwarenfabrik Embrach; zur Geschichte eines verschwundenen Zeitzeugen der Keramikindustrie; IMBREX Holding AG 2010
