= Vetropack =

Swiss glass packaging manufacturer

- Formerly: Verrerie SA
- Traded as: SIX: VETN
- Industry: Glass
- Founded: 1911
- Founder: Henri Cornaz
- Headquarters: Bülach, Switzerland
- Products: Packaging glass
- Revenue: CHF 778.9 million (2025)
- Number of employees: 3,532 (2025)
- Website: vetropack.com

Vetropack is a Swiss manufacturer of packaging glass. It goes back to the Verrerie SA, a glassworks opened in Saint-Prex by Henri Cornaz in 1911, which became Vetropack Holding SA in 1969. From 1986 the group bought glassworks in Austria, the Czech Republic, Croatia, Slovakia, and Ukraine.

== History ==
The Saint-Prex glassworks in 1931, aerial photograph by Walter Mittelholzer

Created in 1966, Vetropack managed the branches of the Verrerie SA, the glassworks that Henri Cornaz had opened in Saint-Prex in 1911. Cornaz had taken over the Semsales glassworks in 1912, which was later integrated into the Saint-Prex works, and the Bülach glassworks in 1917 (closed in 2002). In 1959 the company bought the Zurich firm Müller+Krempel SA, to which the Wauwil glassworks (closed in 1993) belonged. The Verrerie SA, the main producer of packaging glass in Switzerland, became Vetropack Holding SA in 1969.

The group bought glassworks in Austria in 1986 and 1993, in the Czech Republic in 1991, in Croatia in 1996, in Slovakia in 2002, and in Ukraine in 2006. In 2010 Vetropack had some 3,000 employees, who produced more than 4,000 metric tons of packaging glass a day.

== Bibliography ==
- H. Rieben et al., Portraits de 250 entreprises vaudoises, 1980, 47–53
- K. Lüönd, Le verre, reflet de l'esprit du temps, 2011 (German edition: Zeitgeist im Glas, 2011)
