= Winterthur Wülflingen railway station =

Railway station in Switzerland

Winterthur Wülflingen
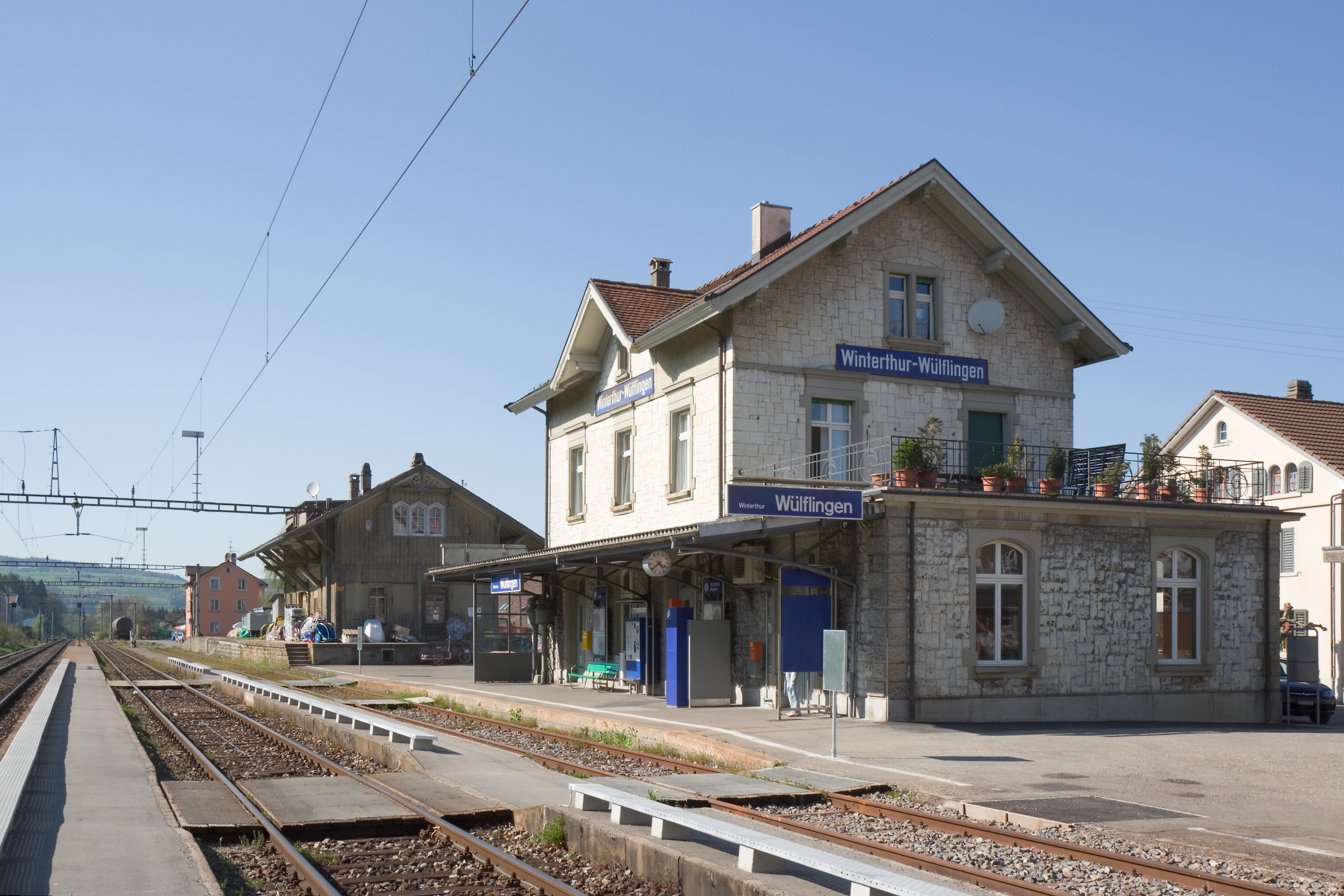
- The station in 2007

General information
- Location: Wydenweg 13; Winterthur, Zürich; Switzerland
- Elevation: 422 m (1,385 ft)
- Owner: Swiss Federal Railways
- Line: Winterthur–Bülach–Koblenz railway
- Platforms: 2
- Train operators: Thurbo
- Connections: Stadtbus Winterthur line 7

Construction
- Architect: Karl Strasser (1908)

Other information
- Fare zone: 120 (ZVV)

History
- Opened: 1 August 1876
- Rebuilt: 1908
- Electrified: 15 July 1945

Services
Preceding station	Zurich S-Bahn	Following station
Pfungen towards Bülach	S41	Winterthur Töss towards Winterthur
Pfungen towards Bülach	SN41 Limited service	Winterthur Töss towards Winterthur
Location
- Location within Switzerland Location within Canton of Zurich

Winterthur Wülflingen railway station (German: Bahnhof Winterthur Wülflingen) is a railway station that serves Wülflingen, which is district number 6 in Winterthur, a city in the canton of Zurich, Switzerland. It forms part of the Winterthur–Bülach–Koblenz railway.

It is one of ten railway stations in the city of Winterthur (fare zone 120 of ZVV), the others being: Oberwinterthur, Reutlingen, Sennhof-Kyburg, Winterthur, Winterthur Grüze, Winterthur Hegi, Winterthur Seen, Winterthur Töss, and Winterthur Wallrüti.

== Location and layout ==
The station is situated to the southeast of the Wülflingen district, and separated from the district's centre by the A1/A4 motorway.

The station's architectural features, consisting of a station building and a goods shed, are inscribed on the Swiss Inventory of Cultural Property of National Significance, as a typical station from the turn of the century.

Winterthur Wülflingen has two platform tracks. The station itself is now unstaffed, and a restaurant is housed in the station building. Opposite the station is the Niderfeld industrial zone, which is connected to the railway tracks.

== History ==
At the time of their planning and construction, the railway line and station were outside the district limits, and it was anticipated that they would serve primarily freight traffic to and from the spinning factory. For that reason, work began in 1875 on the construction of a simple timber station building. This building, a freight shed with integrated station office, was ready for occupation in time for the opening of the Winterthur–Bülach–Koblenz railway.

Due to industrialization and a consequential increase in the residential population, the town gradually expanded enough to reach the station, making a proper station building necessary. That is why the present station building, which, at the time, was promoted in Wülflingen in exaggerated fashion with a direct "Wülflingen–Paris" rail link, was built in 1908.

The original building, located west of the 1908 station building, has remained to this day as a goods shed.

== Services ==
=== Rail ===
As of the December 2023 timetable change, the following services stop at Winterthur Wülflingen:

- Zurich S-Bahn
  - S41: half-hourly service between Bülach and Winterthur.
  - SN41: on Friday and Saturday night, one round-trip between Bülach and Winterthur.

=== Bus ===
One Stadtbus Winterthur bus line calls at Winterthur Wülflingen:

Line	Route
7	Bhf. Winterhur – Schlosstal – Bhf. Wülflingen

As of the December 2010 timetable change, there was also an extra weekend night bus line, which runs at similar intervals to the daytime service.

== See also ==
- History of rail transport in Switzerland
- Rail transport in Switzerland
