= Bülach =

- Municipality
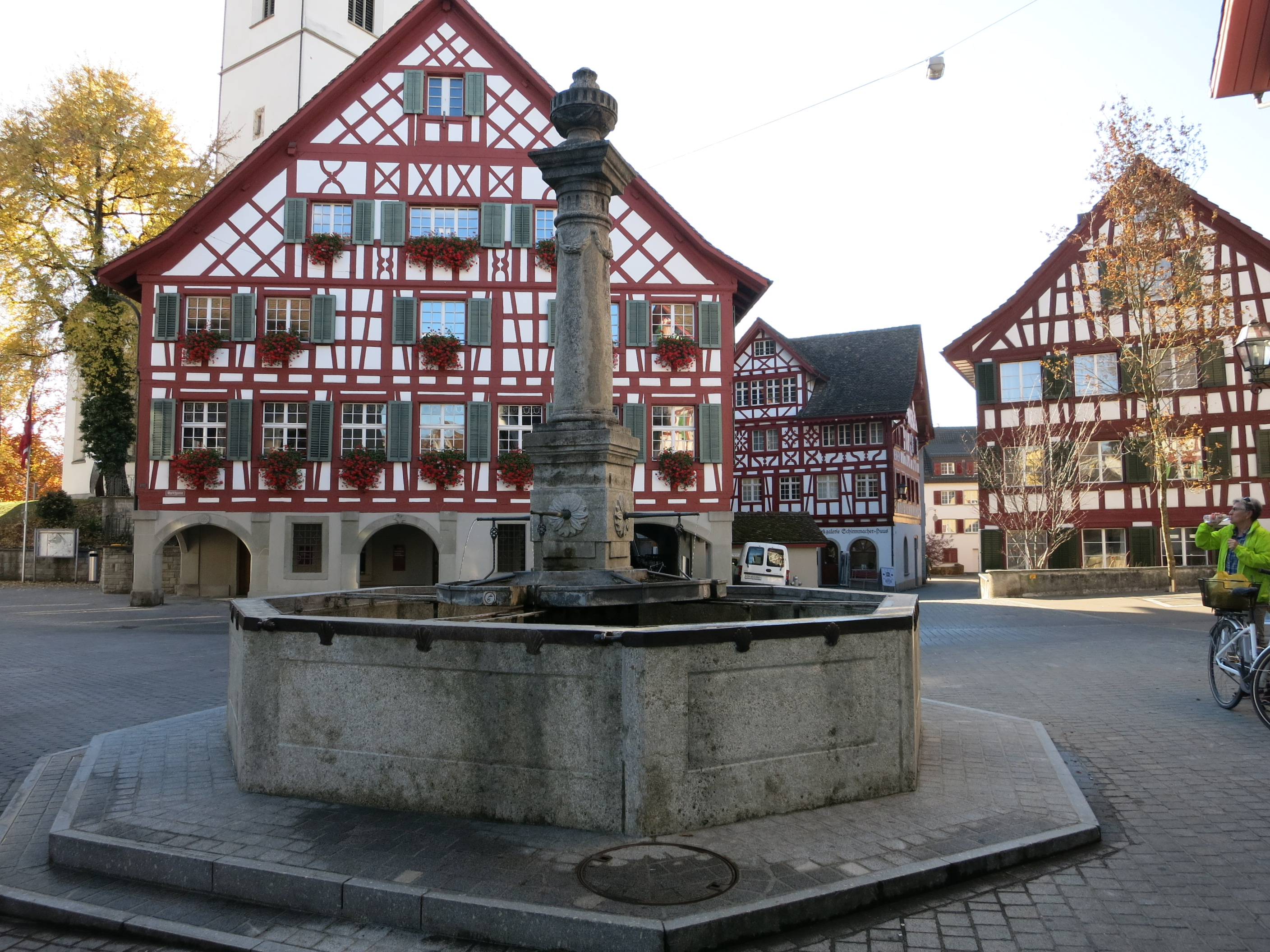

- Flag Coat of arms
- Location of Bülach
- Location within Switzerland Location within Canton of Zürich
- Coordinates: 47°31′N 8°32′E
- Country: Switzerland
- Canton: Zürich
- District: Bülach

Government
  - Executive: Stadtrat with 7 members
  - Mayor: Stadtpräsident; Mark Eberli Evangelical People's Party of Switzerland
  - Parliament: Gemeinderat with 28 members

Area
  - Total: 16.09 km^{2} (6.21 sq mi)
- Elevation (Kreisel Marktgasse): 416 m (1,365 ft)

Population (December 2020)
  - Total: 21,998
  - Density: 1,367/km^{2} (3,541/sq mi)
- Demonym: German: Bülacher(in) or Büler(in)
- Time zone: UTC+01:00 (CET)
  - Summer (DST): UTC+02:00 (CEST)
- Postal code: 8180
- SFOS number: 53
- ISO 3166 code: CH-ZH
- Localities: Nussbaumen, Eschenmosen, Wisli,
- Surrounded by: Bachenbülach, Eglisau, Embrach, Glattfelden, Hochfelden, Höri, Rorbas, Winkel
- Twin towns: Santeramo in Colle (Italy)
- Website: www.buelach.ch

Bülach (German pronunciation: [ˈbyːlax]; High Alemannic: Büüli) is a historic town and a municipality in Switzerland in the canton of Zürich. It is the administrative capital of Bülach district. It is situated in the Glatt Valley (German: Glattal) to the east of the small river Glatt and about 4 km (2.5 mi) south of the High Rhine and about 6 km (3.7 mi) north of the Zurich Airport.

The official language of Bülach is Swiss Standard German, but the main spoken language is the local variant of the Alemannic Swiss German dialect.

== History ==
Aerial view by Walter Mittelholzer (1933)

Bülach is first mentioned in 811 as Pulacha. From early times it fell within the province of the Alamanni. Joachim Werner's description of the early cemetery excavated there was published in 1953.

== Geography ==
Bülach has an area of 16.1 km^{2} (6.2 sq mi). Of this area, 33.2% is used for agricultural purposes, 39.5% is forested, 26.9% is settled (buildings or roads) and the remainder (0.4%) is non-productive (rivers, glaciers or mountains).

The municipality is located around the lower Glatt Valley. The town of Bülach and the village of Niederflachs are in the valley. Around the town are the hamlets of Heimgarten am Rinsberg, Eschenmosen (since 1919, earlier part of Winkel) and Nussbaumen am Dettenberg. The municipality of Bachenbülach was part of Bülach until 1849 when it became an independent municipality. Bülach is located on the old road from Zürich through Kloten to Eglisau.

The historical population of Bülach is listed in the following table:

year	population
Late Middle Ages	less than 500
16-18th Centuries	about 1,000
1836	1,278
1850	1,545
1900	2,175
1920	3,239
1950	4,634
1970	11,043
2000	13,999
2005	14,815
2006	15,571
2008	16,589
2010	17,478
January 2012	17,457
May 2012	17,667
2023	23,593

== Demographics ==
Bülach has a population (as of 31 December 2020) of 21,998. As of 2007, 22.6% of the population was made up of foreign nationals. Over the last 10 years the population has grown at a rate of 17.8%. Most of the population (as of 2000) speaks German (83.9%), with Italian being second most common ( 4.7%) and Serbo-Croatian being third ( 2.5%).

In the 2007 election the most popular party was the SVP which received 38.3% of the vote. The next three most popular parties were the SPS (17%), the CSP (12.5%) and the FDP (11.2%).

The age distribution of the population (as of 2000) is as follows: children and teenagers (0–19 years old) make up 23.1% of the population, while adults (20–64 years old) make up 64.8% and seniors (over 64 years old) make up 12.2%. In Bülach about 73.2% of the population (between age 25–64) have completed either non-mandatory upper secondary education or additional higher education (either university or a Fachhochschule).

== Attractions ==
The Reformed Church and the popular Sigristenkeller gallery stand on a small hill, and are surrounded by pretty old buildings, including the Pfarrhaus and the old Tithe Barn. The church is named after Saint Laurentius, to whom the town's coat of arms is dedicated. Saint Laurentius was deacon to Pope Sixtus II, and became a martyr when he was condemned to death by fire in 258 AD. The church forms a well-matched unit with the Town Hall, and has a tower rising above it to a height of 74 meters. Also on the first Saturday of every month at 6pm, trumpeters play for half an hour from the top of the tower.

Duke Leopold III of Austria (Habsburg) granted Bülach a town charter in 1384, including its own jurisdiction and the right to hold its own market.

== Economy and transport ==
One of the most important institutions in the town and its biggest employer (over 700 employees) is the regional hospital Spital Bülach with 200 beds. Other important employers include the traditional glass producer Vetropack, civil engineering firm Mageba, and the Zürcher Unterländer newspaper.

Bülach has an unemployment rate of 3.07%. As of 2005, there were 130 people employed in the primary economic sector and about 36 businesses involved in this sector. 1893 people are employed in the secondary sector and there are 133 businesses in this sector. 5596 people are employed in the tertiary sector, with 607 businesses in this sector.

Bülach railway station is a node of the Zürich S-Bahn on the lines S41 and S9. Its train station is a 24-minute (S9) ride from Zürich Hauptbahnhof.

It also has a direct bus link from Zurich Airport which takes 25 minutes on 530 service.

== Education ==
The primary schools include Schuleinheit Böswisli, Schuleinheit Schwerzgrueb, Schuleinheit Lindenhof, and Schuleinheit Hohfuri.

Lower secondary schools include Schule Hinterbirch and Schule Mettmenriet.

The Kantonsschule Zürcher Unterland (KZU) is located in Bülach.

== Notable people ==
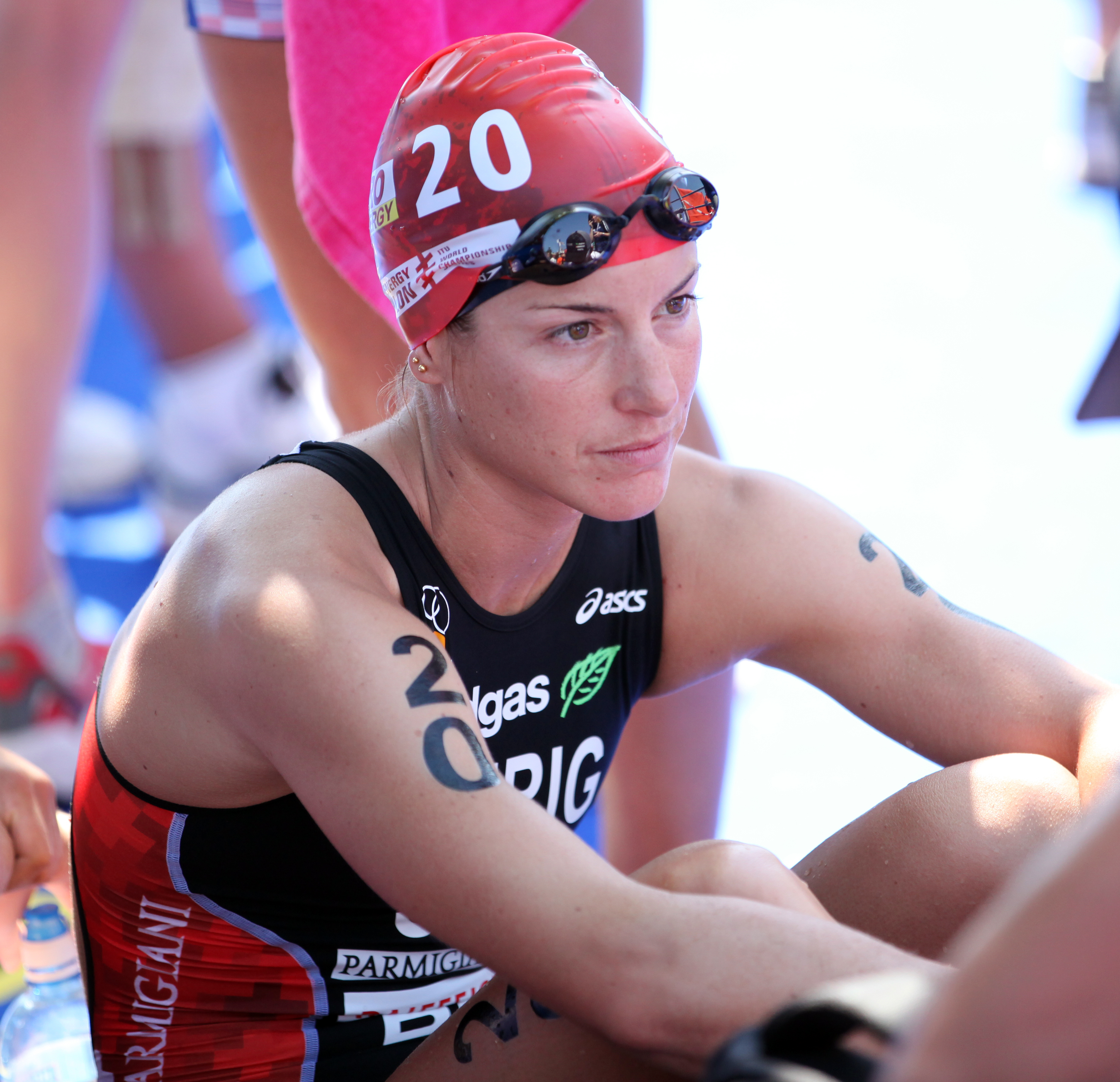
Nicola Spirig, 2011

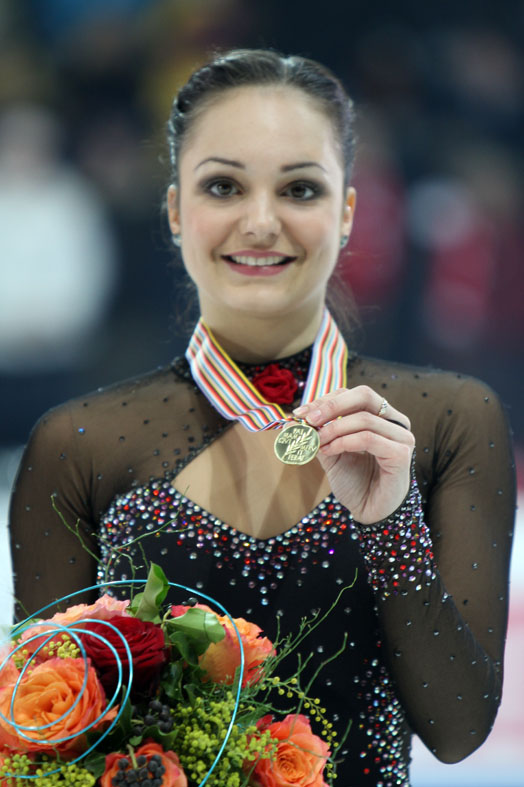
Sarah Meier, 2011

- Sir John Brunner (born 1842) British Industrialist
- Jürg Gutknecht (born 1949) computer scientist
- Daniel Klajner (born 1963) conductor, teaches orchestral conducting at the University of Music and Performing Arts Vienna
- Claude Meier (born 1964) Divisional general of the Swiss Armed Forces

Sport

- Kurt Klingler (born 1928) former sports shooter, competed in the 1968 Summer Olympics
- Karl Elsener (1934–2010) football goalkeeper, 34 caps for the Switzerland 1958/1966
- Louis Pfenninger (born 1944) former racing cyclist, competed in the 1964 Summer Olympics
- Ercüment Şahin (born 1968) Turkish retired professional footballer, over 360 club caps
- Marcello Marrocco (born 1969) a retired Italian professional footballer, over 325 club caps
- Martin Plüss (born 1977) retired professional ice hockey player
- Nicola Spirig (born 1982) professional triathlete, competed in the 2012 Summer Olympics
- Sarah Meier (born 1984) former figure skater, eight-time Swiss national champion
- Christine Meier (born 1986) ice hockey player
- Reto Berra (born 1987) professional ice hockey goaltender
- Martina van Berkel (born 1989) butterfly swimmer, competed in the 2012 Summer Olympics
- Ramona Elsener (born 1992) ice dancer
- Eddy Yusof (born 1994) male artistic gymnast, lives in Bülach
- Niels Hintermann (born 1995) World Cup alpine ski racer
- Nico Georgiadis (born 1996) chess grandmasterboen
- Benoît Schwarz-van Berkel (born 1991) Swiss Olympic curling team
