= S41 (ZVV) =

Railway service in Switzerland

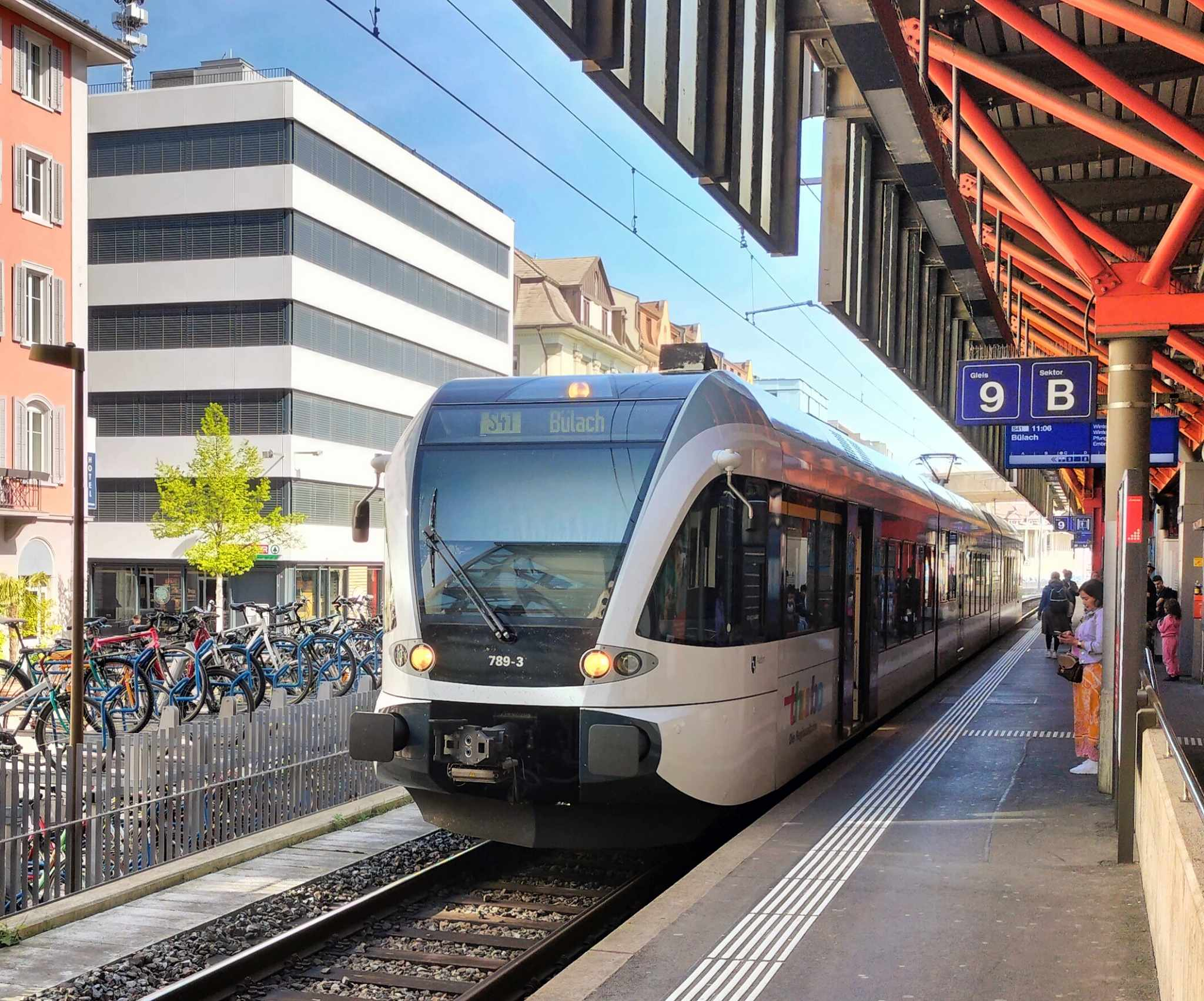
- Stadler GTW of Thurbo operating as S41 service at Winterthur

Overview
- Status: Operational
- Locale: Canton of Zurich, Switzerland
- Termini: Winterthur; Bülach
- Stations: 6
- Website: ZVV (in English)

Service
- Type: S-Bahn
- System: Zurich S-Bahn
- Operator(s): Zürcher Verkehrsverbund (ZVV)
- Rolling stock: Thurbo Stadler GTW

Technical
- Track gauge: 1,435 mm (4 ft 8 1/2 in)

The S41 is a regional railway line of the Zürich S-Bahn on the ZVV. It connects the cities of Bülach and Winterthur in the canton of Zürich, calling at all intermediate stations.

== Route ==
- S41 Winterthur–Bülach

The line runs on the Winterthur–Bülach–Koblenz railway and serves the following stations:

- Winterthur Hauptbahnhof
- Winterthur Töss
- Winterthur Wülflingen
- Pfungen
- Embrach-Rorbas
- Bülach

== Scheduling ==
The train frequency between Winterthur Hauptbahnhof and Bülach is once every 30 minutes.

== Rolling stock ==
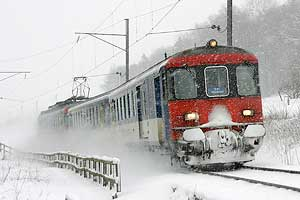
Former RABDe 510 operating as S41 in 2008

Initially, the line was served by Swiss Federal Railways RABDe 510 push-pull trains. All services are now operated by electrically powered Stadler GTW trains belonging to THURBO.

== History ==
Zürich S-Bahn network as of December 2018

Until 2019, the S41 continued once per hour from Bülach to Waldshut in southern Germany. This route is now operated by the S36 service.

== See also ==
- Rail transport in Switzerland
- Public transport in Zurich
- ZVV fare zones
