= Zürcher Unterland =

Region of Switzerland

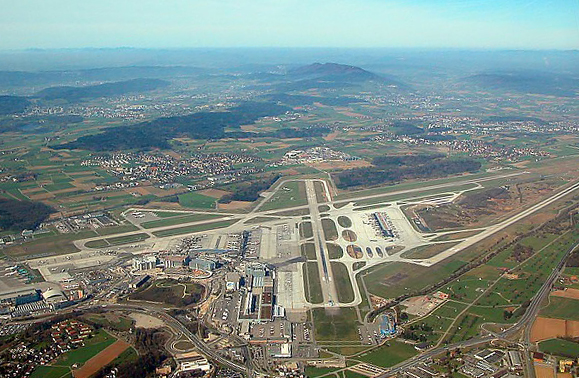
Aerial view of Zurich Airport, looking northwest, towards Rümlang, Oberglatt, Niederhasli, Dielsdorf, Buchs, Regensberg and the Lägern.

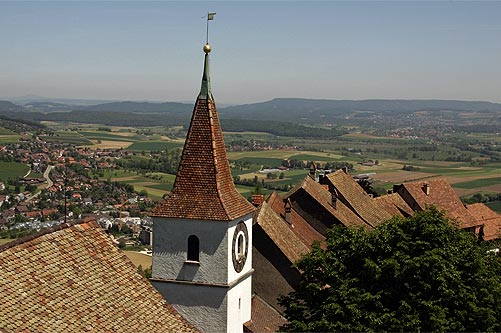
View from Regensberg castle, looking northeast towards Neerach, Bülach and the Irchel.

The Zürcher Unterland ("Zurich lowlands") comprises the northwestern part of the canton of Zurich, including the districts of Bülach and Dielsdorf.

Geographically, it is located in the Swiss Plateau, between the Limmat Valley, the city of Zurich and the Zürcher Oberland in the south, river Rhine and Germany in the north. Its limit in the west is the border to the canton Aargau, in the east it ends at the district of Winterthur and the Töss river. The elevation range is between the low point of 355m at the Rhine at Eglisau, and the high point of 856m on Lägern. Its main part is lying on both sides of the river Glatt.

With the exception of the Rafzerfeld, the entire region came under the government of the city of Zurich in the course of the 15th century (Regensberg and Bülach in 1409, Regensdorf in 1469).

The region has been strongly influenced economically by Zurich Airport since the 1950s, and has been urbanized, forming part of "Greater Zurich".

There are two regional newspapers, the Zürcher Unterländer and the Neues Bülacher Tagblatt.
