= Irchel =

Elevation in the Canton of Zürich

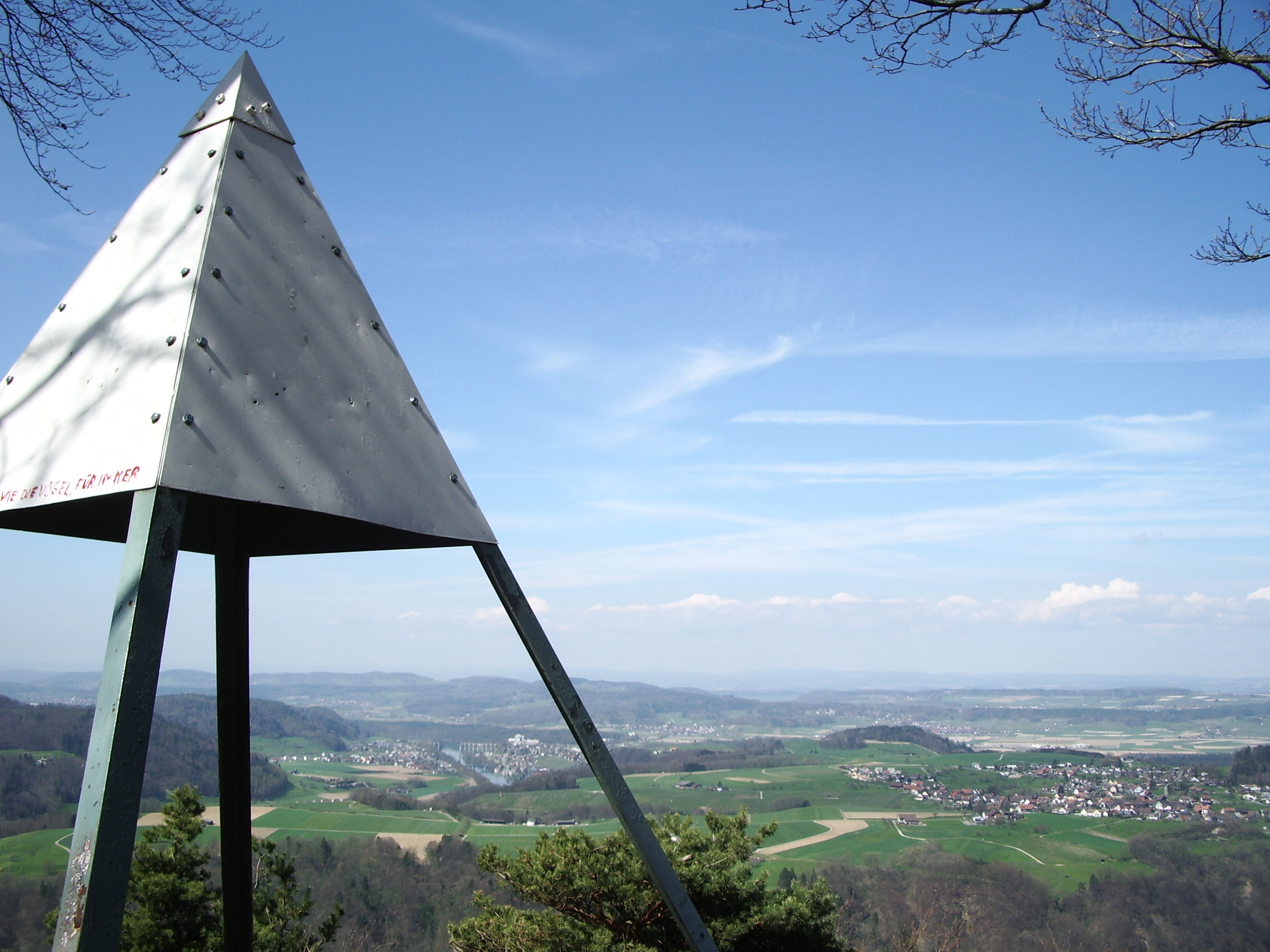
- view from the Hochwacht towards Eglisau and Buchberg

Highest point
- Elevation: 694 m (2,277 ft)
- Prominence: 260 m (850 ft)
- Isolation: 14.9 km (9.3 mi)
- Coordinates: 47°32′22″N 08°36′26″E

Geography
- Location within Switzerland
- Location: Zürich, Switzerland

Climbing
- Easiest route: Trail

Irchel is also the name of a hill in the city of Zürich, and of a campus of Zürich University located there.

The Irchel is an elevation in the Canton of Zürich, located at the Rhine between the Töss and Thur rivers, on the territory of Buch am Irchel, Berg am Irchel and Freienstein-Teufen, separating the Andelfingen and Bülach districts. It is an outlying ridge of the Jura Mountains, rising to 694 m, lying east of the Lägern. Historically, it was part of the Germanic Limes. The name is from a Helvetic word for "stag".

peaks:

- Hochwacht 668.4 m
- Forenirchel 656.4 m
- Buechemer-Irchel Höhe 694 m
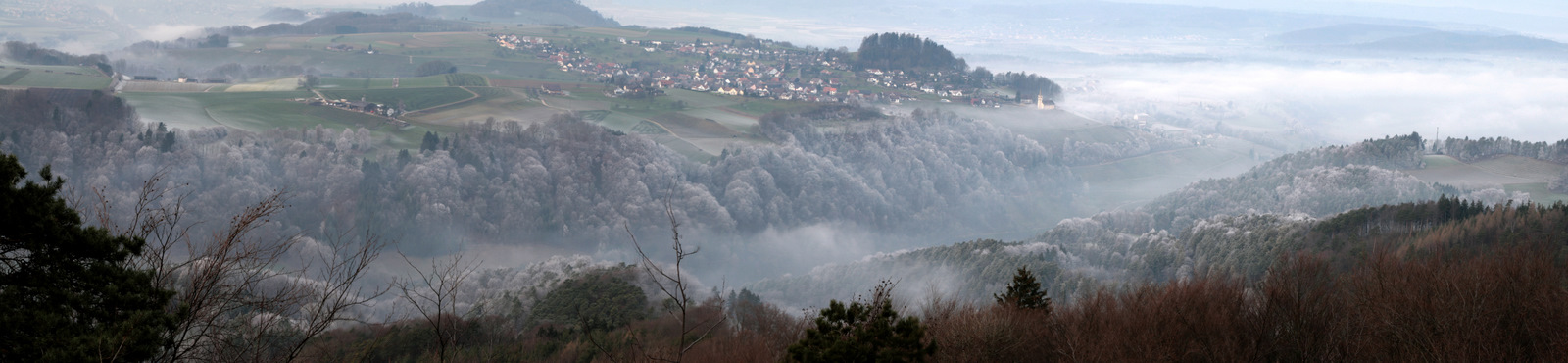
View of the Rhine valley and Buchberg (SH) from the Irchel

== See also ==
- List of most isolated mountains of Switzerland
