= Teufen =

There are two municipalities of Switzerland named Teufen:

- Teufen, Appenzell Ausserrhoden
  - Teufen AR railway station, a station of Appenzell Railways in Teufen
- Freienstein-Teufen in the district of Bülach in the Canton of Zurich
