= Buch am Irchel =

- Municipality
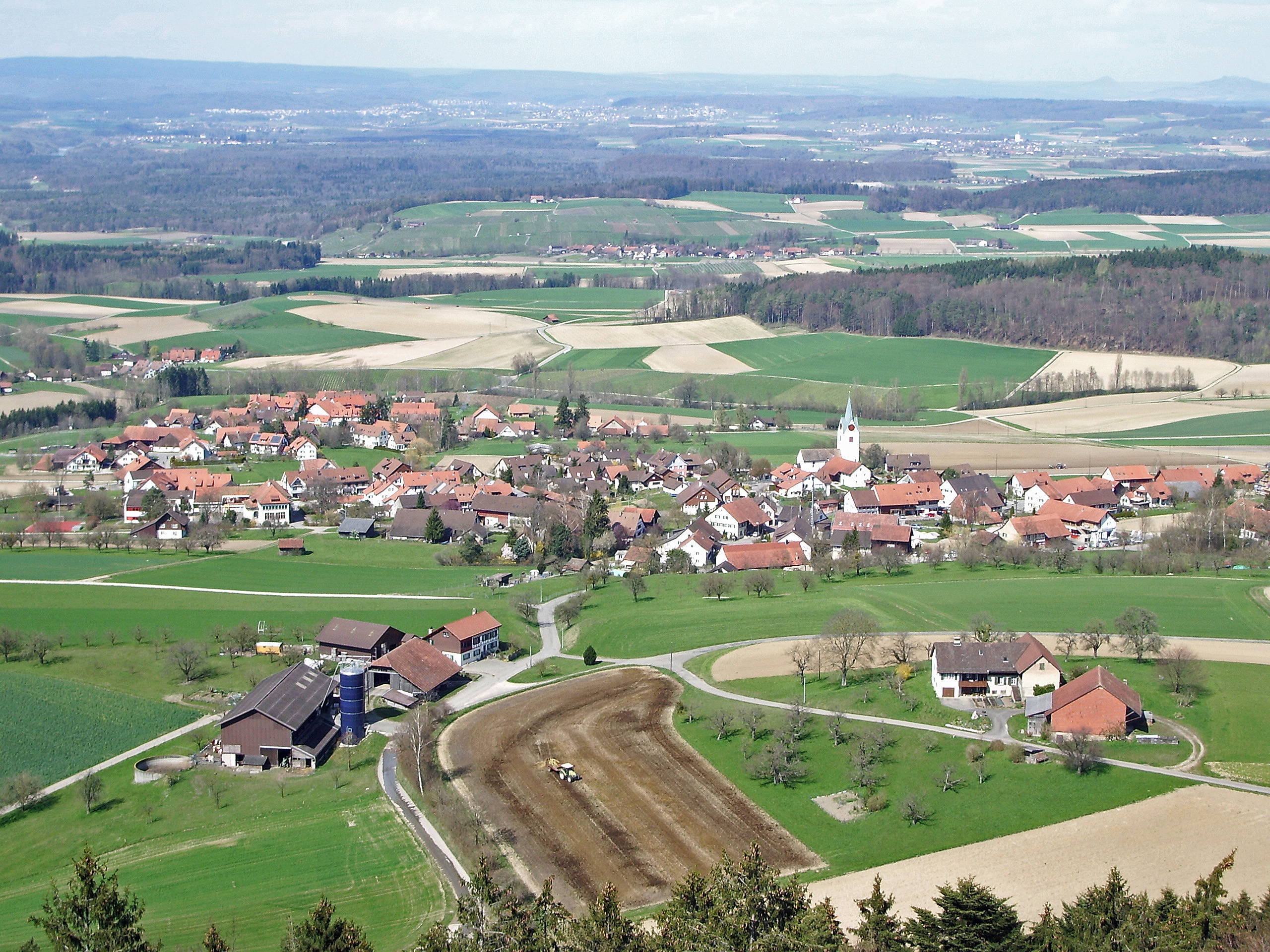

- Flag Coat of arms
- Location of Buch am Irchel
- Location within Switzerland Location within Canton of Zurich
- Coordinates: 47°33′N 8°37′E
- Country: Switzerland
- Canton: Zurich
- District: Andelfingen

Area
  - Total: 10.26 km^{2} (3.96 sq mi)
- Elevation: 534 m (1,752 ft)

Population (December 2020)
  - Total: 1,022
  - Density: 99.61/km^{2} (258.0/sq mi)
- Time zone: UTC+01:00 (CET)
  - Summer (DST): UTC+02:00 (CEST)
- Postal code: 8414
- SFOS number: 24
- ISO 3166 code: CH-ZH
- Localities: Oberbuch, Unterbuch, Bebikon, Desibach, Wiler
- Surrounded by: Berg am Irchel, Dättlikon, Dorf, Freienstein-Teufen, Neftenbach, Volken
- Website: www.buchamirchel.ch

Buch am Irchel is a municipality in the district of Andelfingen in the canton of Zürich in Switzerland.

== History ==
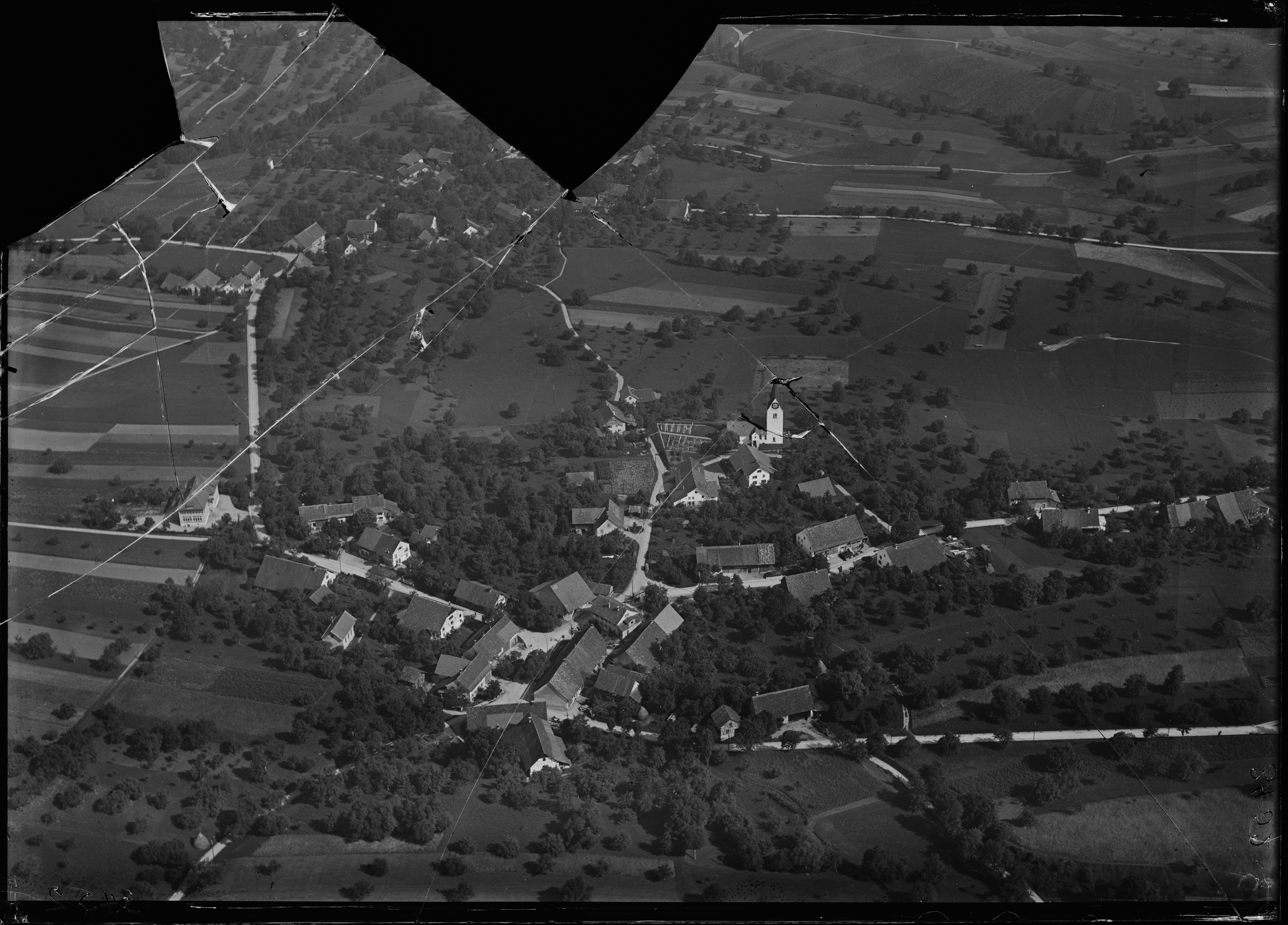
Aerial view from 300 m by Walter Mittelholzer (1923)

Buch am Irchel is first mentioned around 1238 as Buoch. In 1244 it was mentioned as Bebinchon.

== Geography ==
Buch am Irchel has an area of 10.2 km^{2} (3.9 sq mi). Of this area, 56.1% is used for agricultural purposes, while 37.8% is forested. Of the rest of the land, 6% is settled (buildings or roads) and the remainder (0.1%) is non-productive (rivers, glaciers or mountains).

The municipality includes the sections of Ober- and Unterbuch, which are located on the north-east slope of the Irchel elevation. It also includes the sections of Wiler, Bebikon, Desibach and Oberhueb. In 1855, the village of Gräslikon became part of Berg am Irchel.

== Demographics ==
Buch am Irchel has a population (as of 31 December 2020) of 1,022. As of 2007, 5.0% of the population was made up of foreign nationals. Over the last 10 years the population has grown at a rate of 17.5%. Most of the population (as of 2000) speaks German (98.4%), with English and Spanish being the second most common ( 0.3%).

In the 2007 election the most popular party was the SVP which received 46.8% of the vote. The next three most popular parties were the CSP (12.9%), the FDP (12.2%) and the SPS (8.6%).

The age distribution of the population (as of 2000) is children and teenagers (0–19 years old) make up 30.8% of the population, while adults (20–64 years old) make up 58.7% and seniors (over 64 years old) make up 10.6%. The entire Swiss population is generally well educated. In Buch am Irchel about 86.9% of the population (between age 25-64) have completed either non-mandatory upper secondary education or additional higher education (either university or a Fachhochschule).

Buch am Irchel has an unemployment rate of 0.84%. As of 2005, there were 89 people employed in the primary economic sector and about 31 businesses involved in this sector. 31 people are employed in the secondary sector and there are five businesses in this sector. 50 people are employed in the tertiary sector, with 15 businesses in this sector. The historical population is given in the following table:

year	population
1634	311
1736	600
1850	840^{a}
1900	516
1950	445
2000	728

^a Including Gräslikon, which became part of Berg am Irchel in 1855.
