= Flaach =

- Municipality
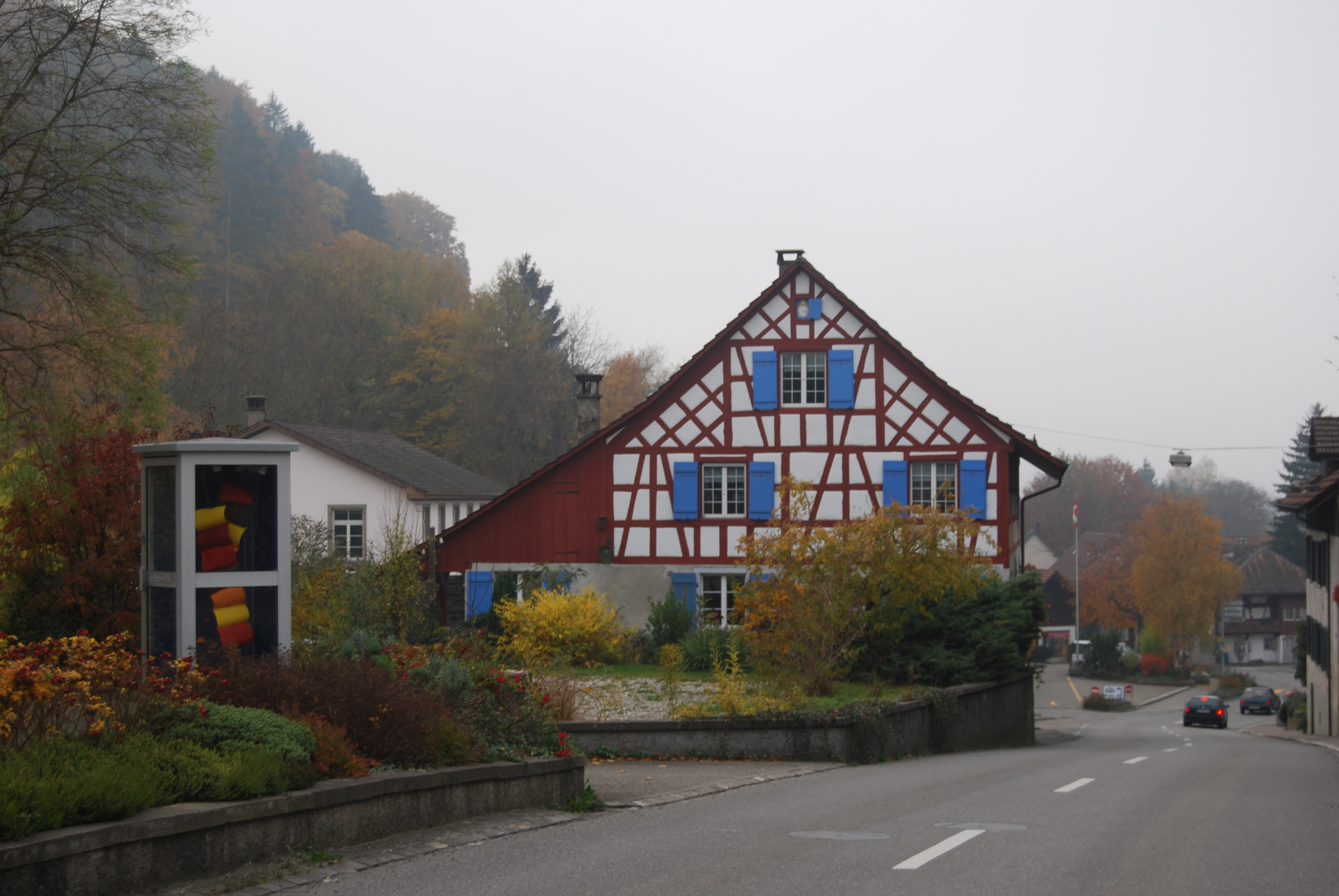

- Flag Coat of arms
- Location of Flaach
- Location within Switzerland Location within Canton of Zurich
- Coordinates: 47°34′33″N 8°36′32″E
- Country: Switzerland
- Canton: Zurich
- District: Andelfingen

Area
  - Total: 10.16 km^{2} (3.92 sq mi)
- Elevation: 360 m (1,180 ft)

Population (December 2020)
  - Total: 1,430
  - Density: 141/km^{2} (365/sq mi)
- Time zone: UTC+01:00 (CET)
  - Summer (DST): UTC+02:00 (CEST)
- Postal code: 8416
- SFOS number: 28
- ISO 3166 code: CH-ZH
- Surrounded by: Andelfingen, Berg am Irchel, Buchberg (SH), Kleinandelfingen, Marthalen, Rüdlingen (SH), Volken
- Website: www.flaach.ch

Flaach is a municipality in the district of Andelfingen in the canton of Zürich in Switzerland.

== History ==
Aerial view (1954)

Flaach is first mentioned in 1044 as Flacha, though the only surviving copy of the document dates from 1347.

== Geography ==
Flaach has an area of 10.2 km^{2} (3.9 sq mi). Of this area, 51.4% is used for agricultural purposes, while 34.2% is forested. Of the rest of the land, 8.2% is settled (buildings or roads) and the remainder (6.2%) is non-productive (rivers, glaciers or mountains).

The municipality is partially agrarian. It is located south of the confluence of the Thur river. The municipality expanded several times at the expense of Berg am Irchel. It expanded in 1619 when Oberdorf joined, in 1775 when Schloss Schollenberg joined and in 1788 when Ziegelhütte joined Flaach.

Schloss Flaach is a Swiss heritage site of national significance.

== Demographics ==
Flaach has a population (as of 31 December 2020) of 1,430. As of 2007, 11.1% of the population was made up of foreign nationals. Over the last 10 years the population has grown at a rate of 10.5%. Most of the population (as of 2000) speaks German (91.6%), with Serbo-Croatian being second most common ( 2.4%) and Albanian being third ( 2.2%).

In the 2007 election the most popular party was the SVP which received 58.3% of the vote. The next three most popular parties were the CSP (12.3%), the SPS (9.2%) and the FDP (6.5%).

The age distribution of the population (as of 2000) is children and teenagers (0–19 years old) make up 29.8% of the population, while adults (20–64 years old) make up 56.3% and seniors (over 64 years old) make up 13.9%. The entire Swiss population is generally well educated. In Flaach about 80.2% of the population (between age 25-64) have completed either non-mandatory upper secondary education or additional higher education (either university or a Fachhochschule).

Flaach has an unemployment rate of 1.56%. As of 2005, there were 123 people employed in the primary economic sector and about 37 businesses involved in this sector. 118 people are employed in the secondary sector and there are 19 businesses in this sector. 426 people are employed in the tertiary sector, with 52 businesses in this sector. The historical population is given in the following table:

year	population
1467	90 Adults
1640	577
1727	797
1836	1,002
1850	1,087
1860	1,103
1900	852
1941	716
1950	758
1980	871
2000	1,164

== Notable residents ==
The seventh Chief Apostle of the New Apostolic Church, Richard Fehr, was born in Flaach on 15 July 1939.
