= Berg am Irchel =

- Municipality
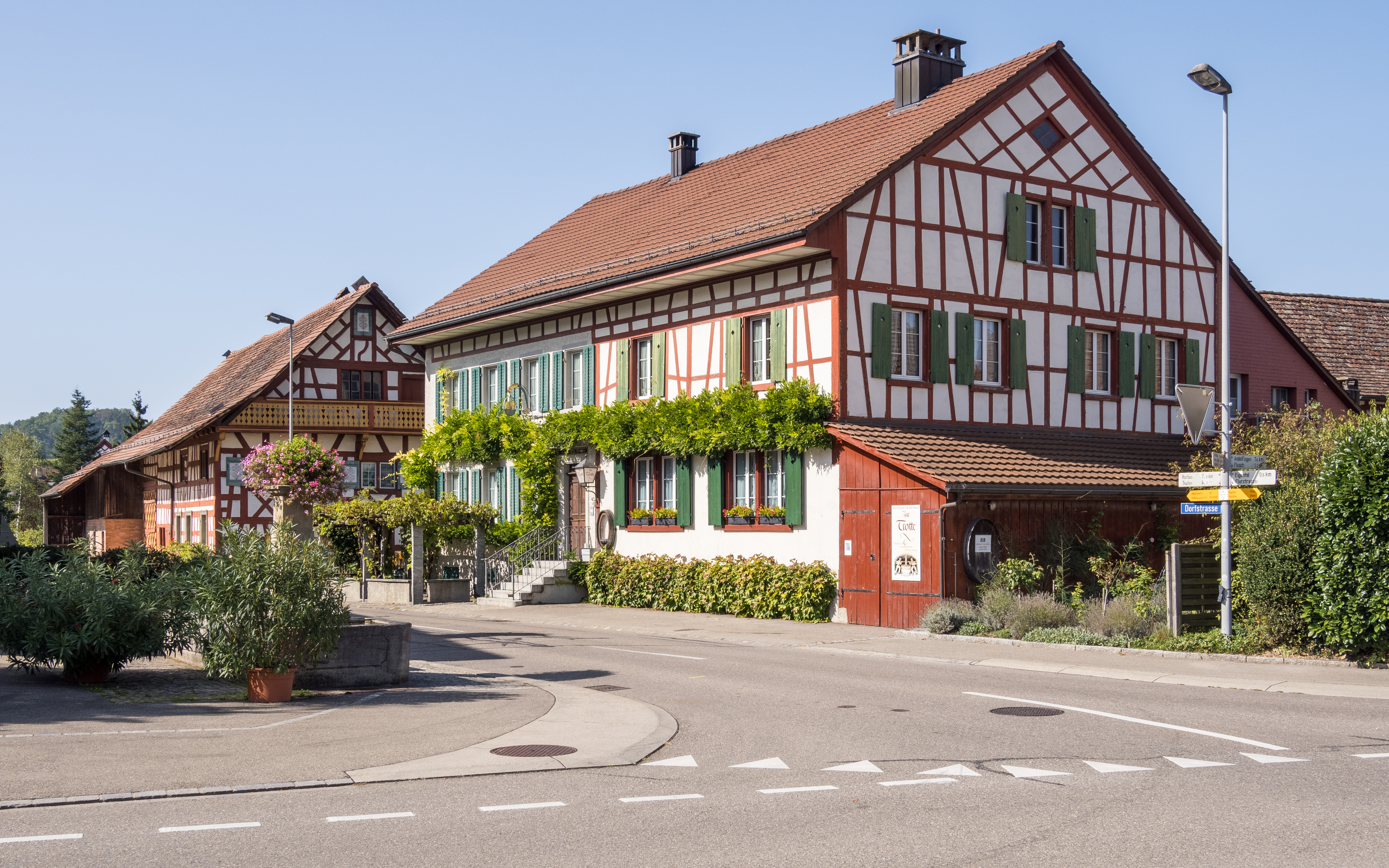

- Flag Coat of arms
- Location of Berg am Irchel
- Location within Switzerland Location within Canton of Zurich
- Coordinates: 47°34′N 8°36′E
- Country: Switzerland
- Canton: Zurich
- District: Andelfingen

Area
  - Total: 7.06 km^{2} (2.73 sq mi)
- Elevation: 410 m (1,350 ft)

Population (December 2020)
  - Total: 595
  - Density: 84.3/km^{2} (218/sq mi)
- Time zone: UTC+01:00 (CET)
  - Summer (DST): UTC+02:00 (CEST)
- Postal code: 8415
- SFOS number: 23
- ISO 3166 code: CH-ZH
- Surrounded by: Buch am Irchel, Flaach, Freienstein-Teufen, Rüdlingen (SH), Volken
- Website: www.berg-am-irchel.ch

Berg am Irchel is a municipality in the district of Andelfingen in the canton of Zürich in Switzerland.

== History ==
Berg am Irchel is first mentioned around 1100 as Berga. In 1243 it was mentioned as Berge.

== Geography ==
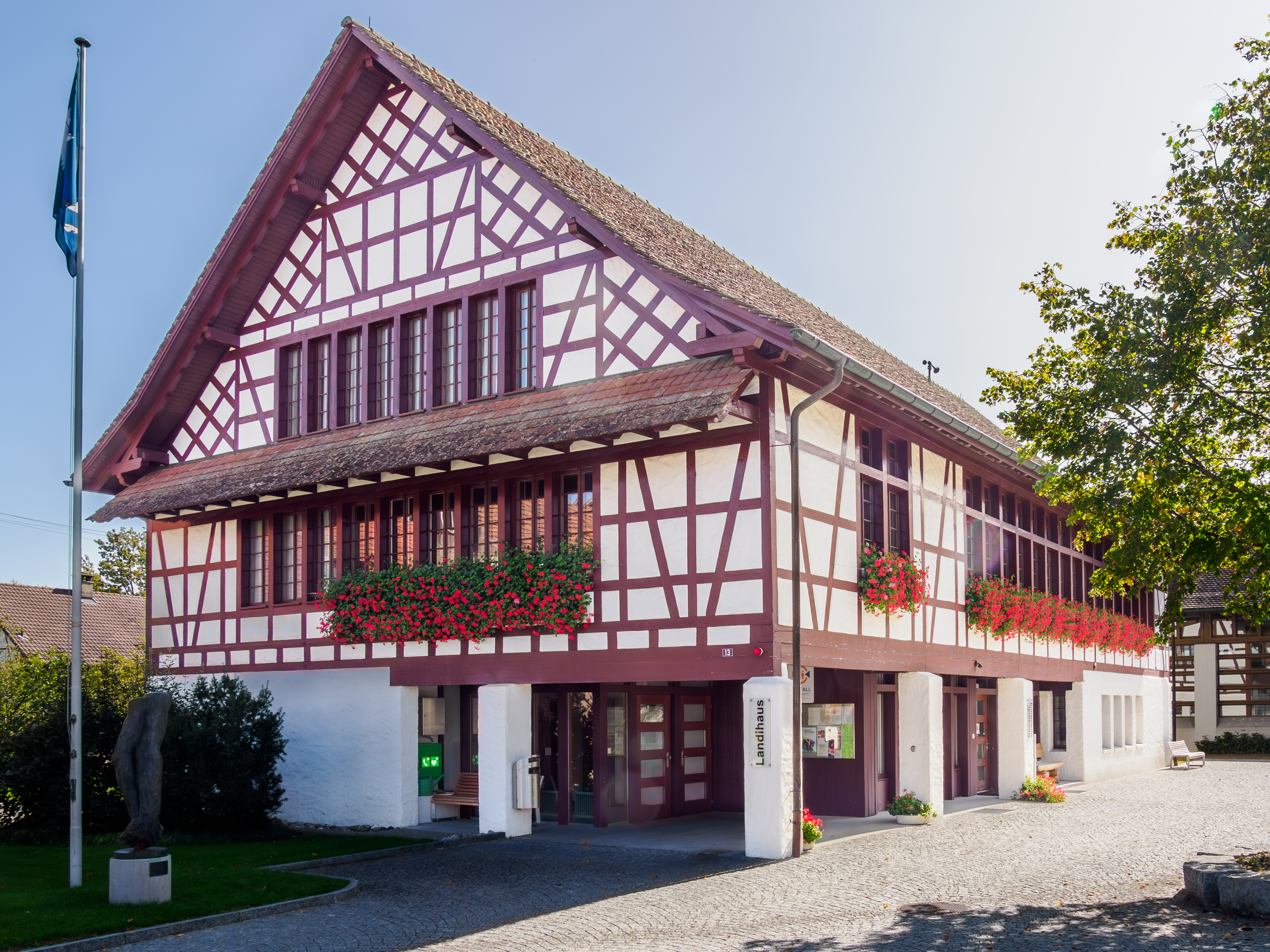
'Landihaus', municipal administration

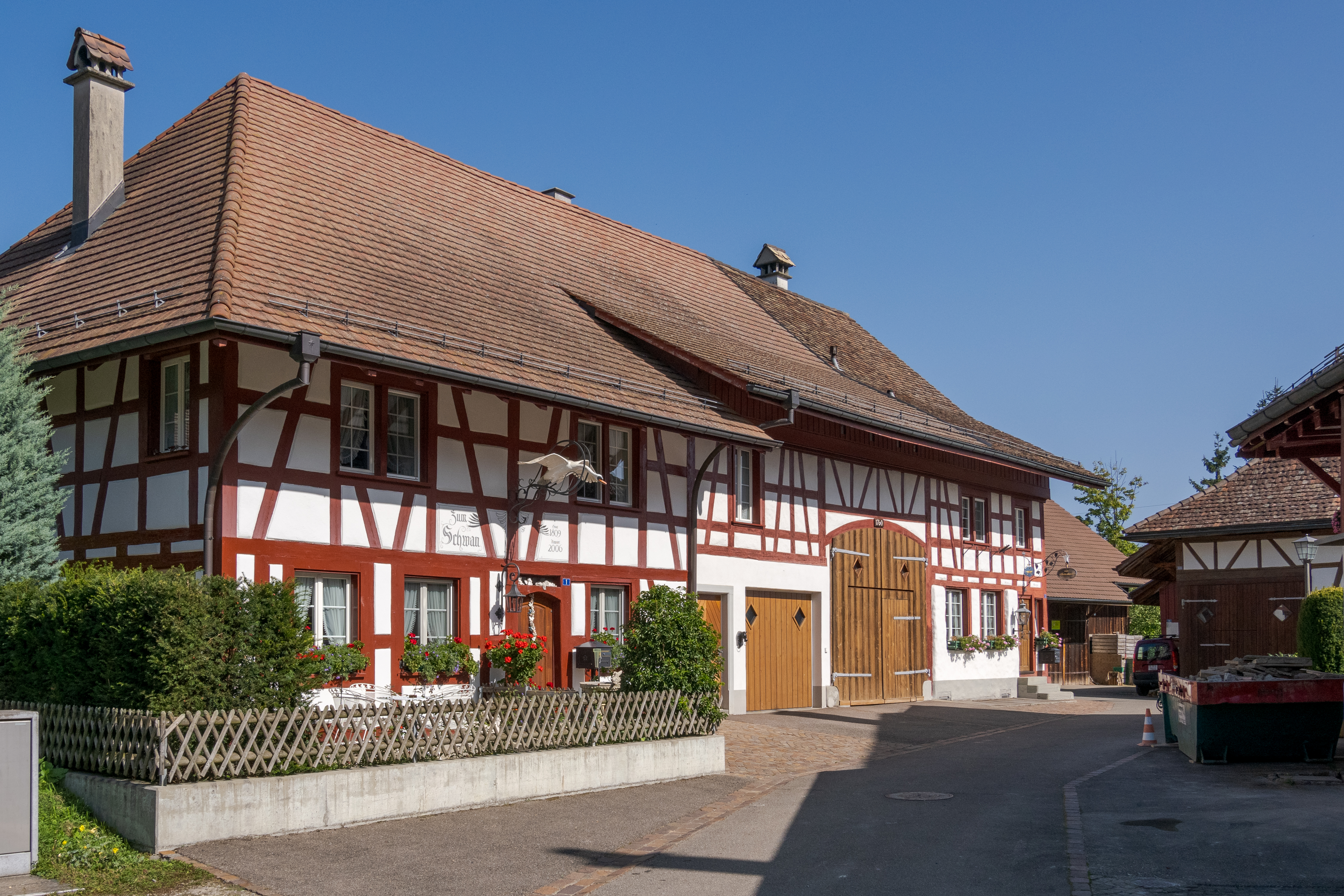
House ‘Zum Schwan’

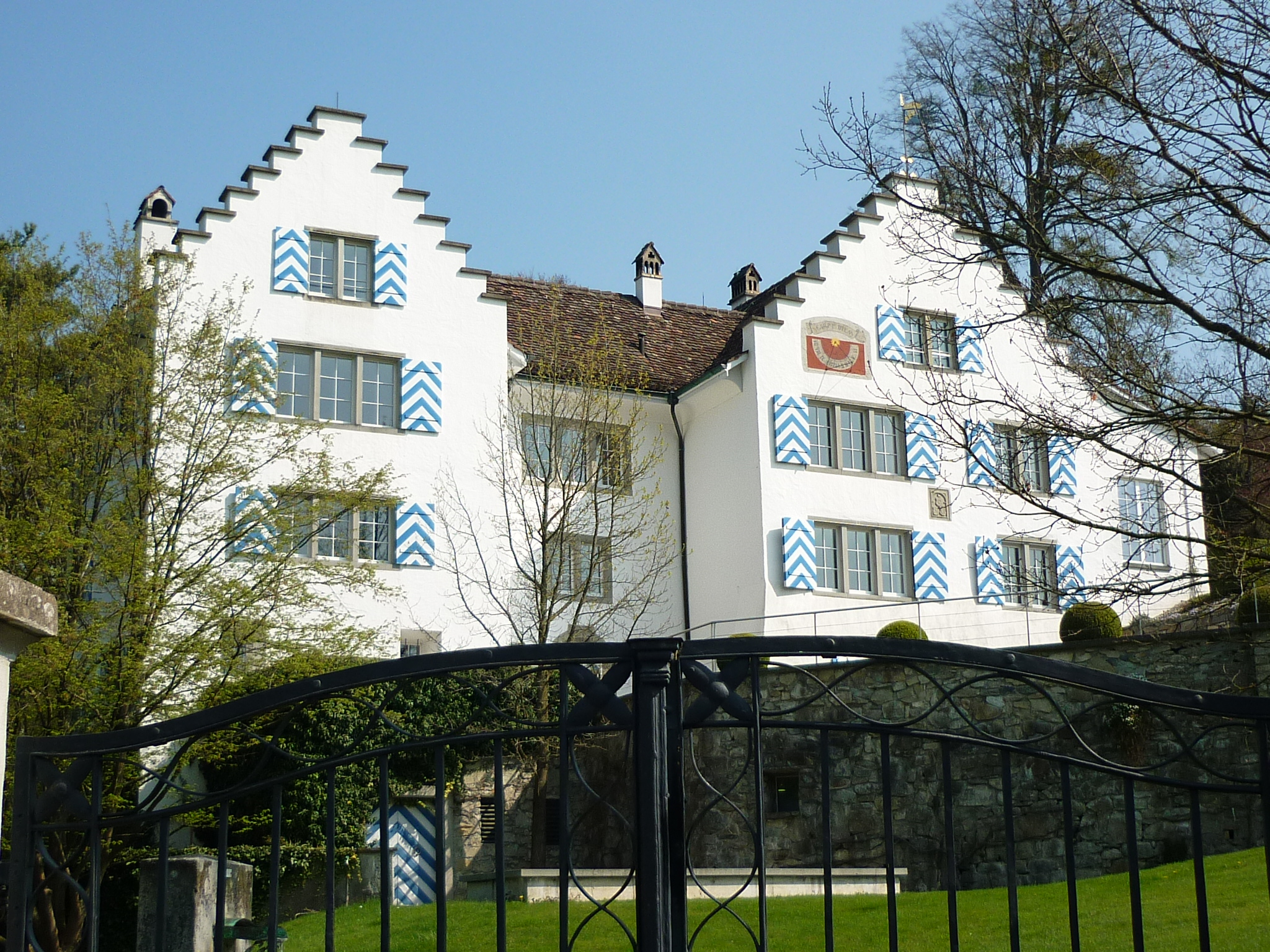
Eigenthal Castle

Aerial view (1954)

Berg am Irchel has an area of 7.1 km^{2} (2.7 sq mi). Of this area, 48.2% is used for agricultural purposes, while 44.8% is forested. Of the rest of the land, 5.7% is settled (buildings or roads) and the remainder (1.3%) is non-productive (rivers, glaciers or mountains).

The municipality is located on a terrace on the northern slope of the Irchel elevation. It includes the village of Berg Gräslikon (which left Buch am Irchel in 1855 to join Berg). In 1619 Oberdorf left the municipality, in 1775 Schloss Schollenberg left and in 1788 Ziegelhütte left as well, all three joining Flaach.

== Demographics ==
Berg am Irchel has a population (as of 31 December 2020) of 595. As of 2007, 3.8% of the population was made up of foreign nationals. Over the last 10 years the population has grown at a rate of 4.3%. Most of the population (as of 2000) speaks German (95.3%), with English being second most common ( 1.0%) and Albanian being third ( 1.0%).

In the 2007 election the most popular party was the SVP which received 52.3% of the vote. The next three most popular parties were the CSP (11.3%), the Green Party (10.2%) and the SPS (9.5%).

The age distribution of the population (as of 2000) is children and teenagers (0–19 years old) make up 28.3% of the population, while adults (20–64 years old) make up 61.1% and seniors (over 64 years old) make up 10.6%. The entire Swiss population is generally well educated. In Berg am Irchel about 79.2% of the population (between age 25–64) have completed either non-mandatory upper secondary education or additional higher education (either university or a Fachhochschule).

Berg am Irchel has an unemployment rate of 0.3%. As of 2005, there were 57 people employed in the primary economic sector and about 28 businesses involved in this sector. 28 people are employed in the secondary sector and there are 12 businesses in this sector. 43 people are employed in the tertiary sector, with 13 businesses in this sector. The historical population is given in the following table:

year	population
1467	10 Households; 31 Adults
1634	397
1698	527^{a}
1860	614
1900	464
1950	405
1980	376
2000	573

^a including Gräslikon, though until 1855 it was part of Buch am Irchel.
