= Dorf, Switzerland =

Dorf
- Municipality
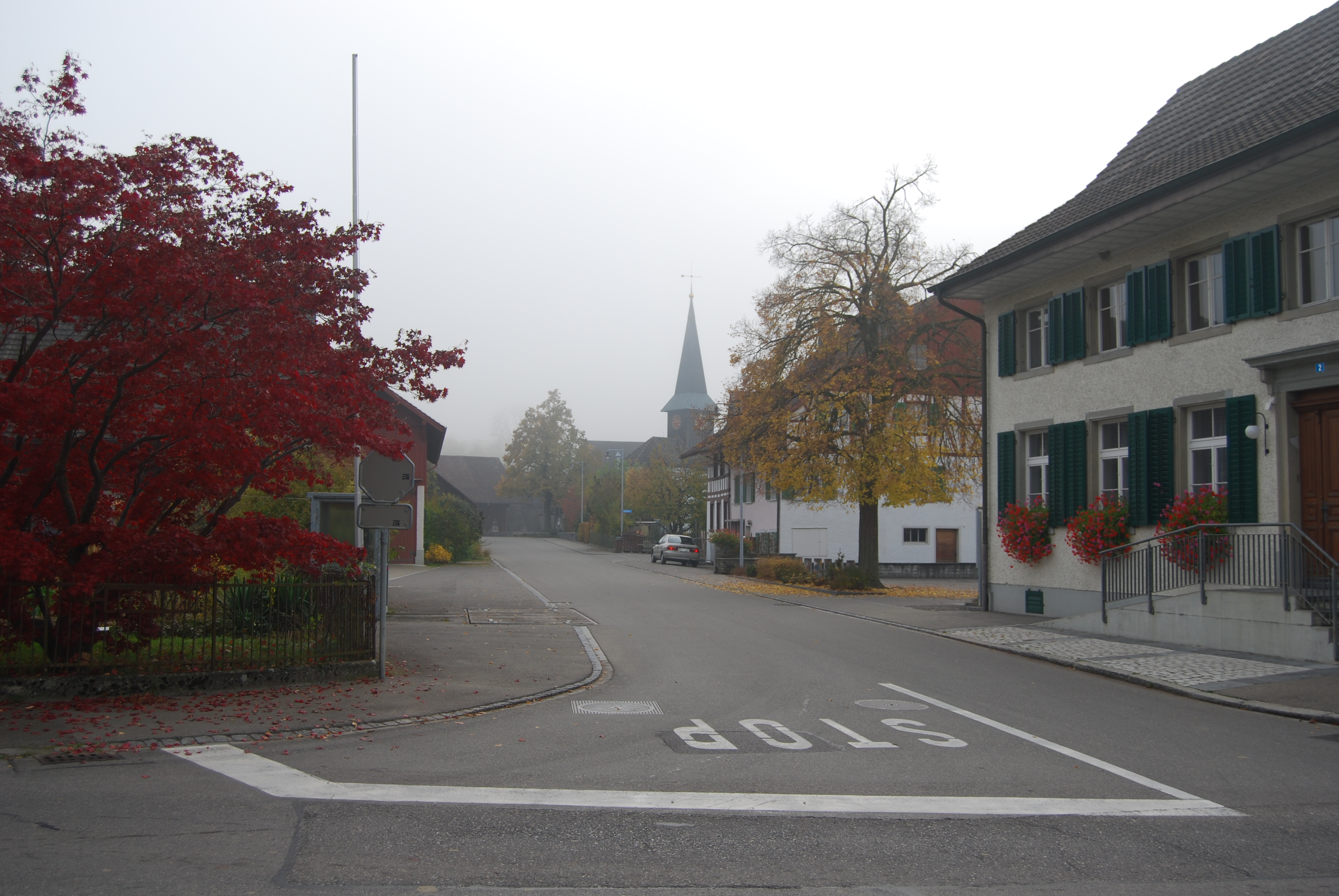

- Flag Coat of arms
- Location of Dorf
- Location within Switzerland Location within Canton of Zurich
- Coordinates: 47°34.319′N 8°38.882′E
- Country: Switzerland
- Canton: Zurich
- District: Andelfingen

Area
  - Total: 5.55 km^{2} (2.14 sq mi)
- Elevation: 426 m (1,398 ft)

Population (December 2020)
  - Total: 666
  - Density: 120/km^{2} (311/sq mi)
- Time zone: UTC+01:00 (CET)
  - Summer (DST): UTC+02:00 (CEST)
- Postal code: 8458
- SFOS number: 26
- ISO 3166 code: CH-ZH
- Surrounded by: Andelfingen, Buch am Irchel, Humlikon, Neftenbach, Volken
- Website: www.dorf.ch

Dorf is a municipality in the district of Andelfingen in the canton of Zürich in Switzerland. The German word Dorf means “village”.

== History ==
Dorf is first mentioned in 1044 as Dorf, though the document that mentions this is a copy from 1347.

Dorf belonged to the church parish of Andelfingen until 1699, when it became an independent Protestant parish.

== Dorf ==
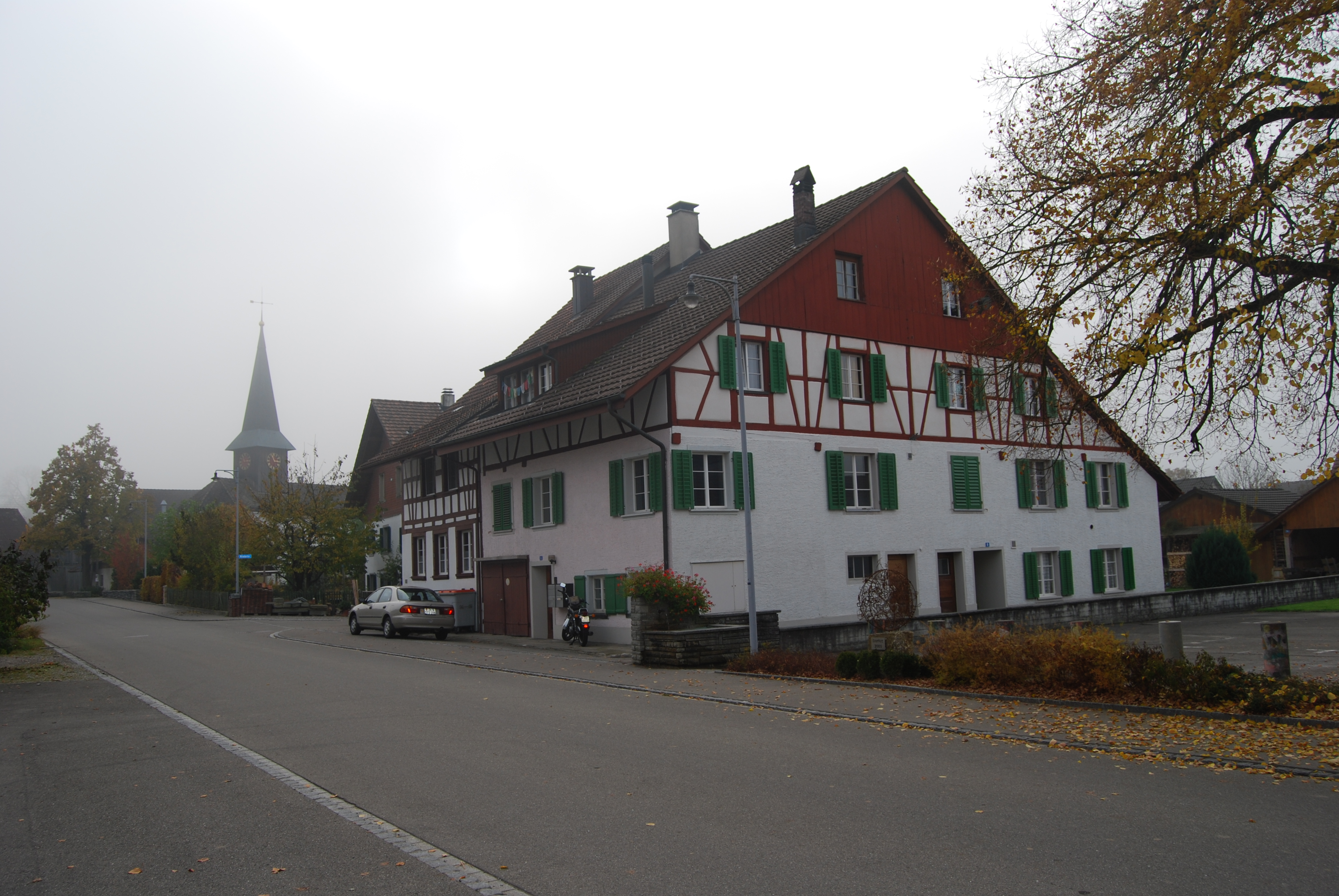
Dorf

Aerial view (1948)

Because Dorf simply means village in German, there are a number of Dorfs throughout Switzerland, Germany and Austria. In Switzerland, Dorf is the only municipality with this name. There are a number of smaller villages or hamlets with either an entire name of Dorf/Dorfli or ending in -dorf.

== Geography ==
Dorf has an area of 5.5 km^{2} (2.1 sq mi). Of this area, 52.7% is used for agricultural purposes, while 40.6% is forested. The rest of the land, (6.7%) is settled.

The municipality is located at the entrance to the Flaacker river valley.

== Demographics ==
Dorf has a population (as of 31 December 2020) of 666. As of 2007, 6.7% of the population was made up of foreign nationals. Over the last 10 years the population has grown at a rate of 20.3%. Most of the population (as of 2000) speaks German (95.4%), with English being second most common ( 1.3%) and Serbo-Croatian being third ( 1.3%).

In the 2007 election the most popular party was the SVP which received 55.5% of the vote. The next three most popular parties were the SPS (9.5%), the local small left-wing parties (9%) and the CSP (8.5%).

The age distribution of the population (as of 2000) is children and teenagers (0–19 years old) make up 27.3% of the population, while adults (20–64 years old) make up 63.9% and seniors (over 64 years old) make up 8.8%. The entire Swiss population is generally well educated. In Dorf about 84.6% of the population (between age 25-64) have completed either non-mandatory upper secondary education or additional higher education (either university or a Fachhochschule).

Dorf has an unemployment rate of 1.2%. As of 2005, there were 42 people employed in the primary economic sector and about 14 businesses involved in this sector. 30 people are employed in the secondary sector and there are nine businesses in this sector. 73 people are employed in the tertiary sector, with 15 businesses in this sector. The historical population is given in the following table:

year	population
1467	50
1634	187
1850	413
1900	336
1950	295
1970	280
2000	593

== Dorf in popular fiction ==
- Dorf is mentioned in Jostein Gaarder's Solitaire Mystery.
