= Volken =

- Municipality
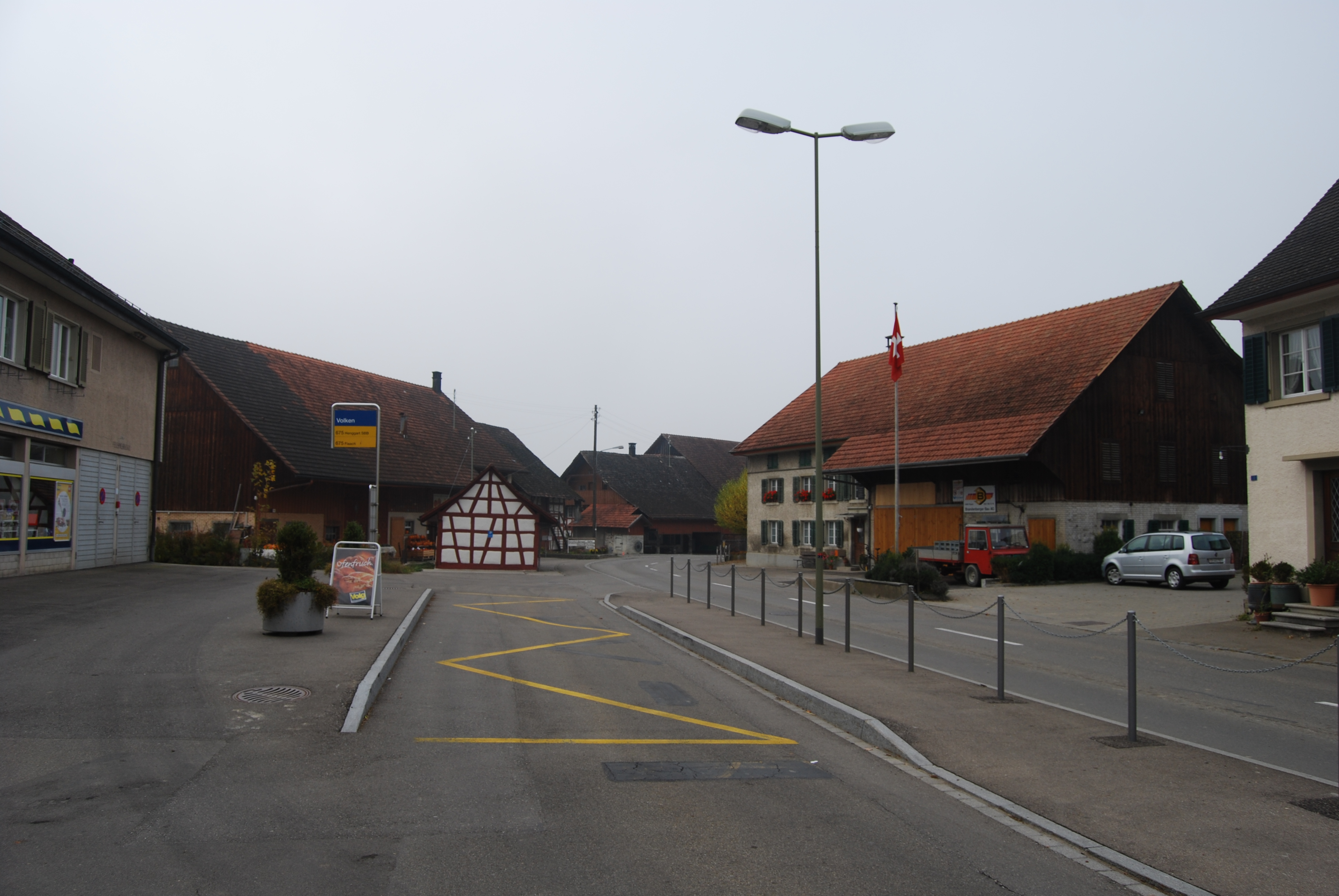

- Flag Coat of arms
- Location of Volken
- Location within Switzerland Location within Canton of Zurich
- Coordinates: 47°35′N 8°38′E
- Country: Switzerland
- Canton: Zurich
- District: Andelfingen

Area
  - Total: 3.21 km^{2} (1.24 sq mi)
- Elevation: 406 m (1,332 ft)

Population (December 2020)
  - Total: 383
  - Density: 119/km^{2} (309/sq mi)
- Time zone: UTC+01:00 (CET)
  - Summer (DST): UTC+02:00 (CEST)
- Postal code: 8459
- SFOS number: 43
- ISO 3166 code: CH-ZH
- Surrounded by: Andelfingen, Berg am Irchel, Buch am Irchel, Dorf, Flaach
- Website: www.volken.ch

Volken is a municipality in the district of Andelfingen in the canton of Zürich in Switzerland.

== Geography ==
Aerial view (1948)

Volken has an area of 3.3 km^{2} (1.3 sq mi). Of this area, 64.2% is used for agricultural purposes, while 29.1% is forested. The rest of the land, (6.7%) is settled.

== Demographics ==
Volken has a population (as of 31 December 2020) of 383. As of 2007, 6.8% of the population was made up of foreign nationals. Over the last 10 years the population has grown at a rate of 15%. Most of the population (as of 2000) speaks German (93.7%), with Albanian being second most common ( 3.7%) and Portuguese being third ( 0.7%).

In the 2007 election the most popular party was the SVP which received 60.5% of the vote. The next three most popular parties were the FDP (12.4%), the CSP (11.2%) and the SPS (9.1%).

The age distribution of the population (as of 2000) is children and teenagers (0–19 years old) make up 28.7% of the population, while adults (20–64 years old) make up 59.3% and seniors (over 64 years old) make up 11.9%. In Volken about 90.5% of the population (between age 25-64) have completed either non-mandatory upper secondary education or additional higher education (either university or a Fachhochschule).

Volken has an unemployment rate of 0.21%. As of 2005, there were 46 people employed in the primary economic sector and about 18 businesses involved in this sector. 4 people are employed in the secondary sector and there are 1 businesses in this sector. 22 people are employed in the tertiary sector, with 7 businesses in this sector.
