= Rüdlingen =

- Municipality
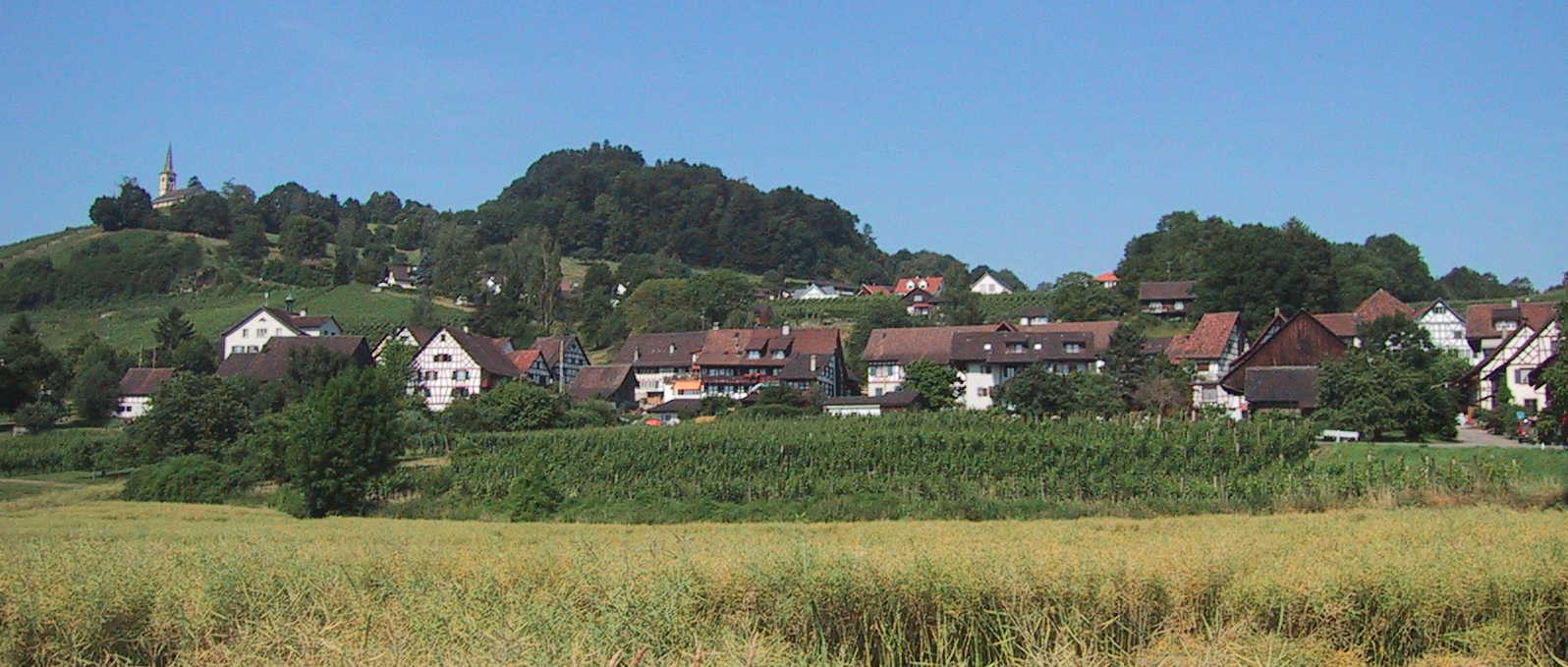

- Coat of arms
- Location of Rüdlingen
- Location within Switzerland Location within Canton of Schaffhausen
- Coordinates: 47°34′N 8°34′E
- Country: Switzerland
- Canton: Schaffhausen
- District: n.a.

Area
  - Total: 5.49 km^{2} (2.12 sq mi)
- Elevation: 367 m (1,204 ft)

Population (December 2008)
  - Total: 665
  - Density: 121/km^{2} (314/sq mi)
- Time zone: UTC+01:00 (CET)
  - Summer (DST): UTC+02:00 (CEST)
- Postal code: 8455
- SFOS number: 2938
- ISO 3166 code: CH-SH
- Surrounded by: Berg am Irchel (ZH), Buchberg, Eglisau (ZH), Flaach (ZH), Freienstein-Teufen (ZH), Lottstetten (DE-BW), Marthalen (ZH), Rafz (ZH)
- Website: www.ruedlingen.ch

Rüdlingen is a municipality in the canton of Schaffhausen in Switzerland.

== History ==
Rüdlingen is first mentioned in 827 as Ruodiningun.

== Geography ==
Aerial view from 300 m by Walter Mittelholzer (1919)

Rüdlingen has an area, as of 2006, of 5.5 km^{2} (2.1 sq mi). Of this area, 47.6% is used for agricultural purposes, while 33.8% is forested. Of the rest of the land, 8.1% is settled (buildings or roads) and the remainder (10.5%) is non-productive (rivers or lakes). The municipality is located in the Schaffhausen district on the Rhine knee above Eglisau.

With Buchberg, Rüdlingen forms one of the two exclaves of the Canton of Schaffhausen on the Rhine, bordered by the Canton of Zürich and Baden-Württemberg.

== Coat of arms ==
The blazon of the municipal coat of arms is Per pale Azure an Oar and a [hook] in saltire Or and Or a Semi Mill Wheel Azure.

== Transportation ==
A road border crossing into Germany's Lottstetten municipality, Baden-Württemberg state, is located at Ischläg. The town in Germany is Nack.

== Demographics ==
Rüdlingen has a population (as of 2008) of 665, of which 7.2% are foreign nationals. Of the foreign population, (as of 2008), 53.1% are from Germany, and 46.9% are from another country. Over the last 10 years the population has grown at a rate of 7.9%. Most of the population (as of 2000) speaks German (96.6%), with French being second most common ( 0.6%) and English being third ( 0.5%).

The age distribution of the population (as of 2008) is children and teenagers (0–19 years old) make up 19.7% of the population, while adults (20–64 years old) make up 65.1% and seniors (over 64 years old) make up 15.2%.

In the 2007 federal election the most popular party was the SVP which received 45% of the vote. The next two most popular parties were the SP (31.4%), and the FDP (23.6%) .

In Rüdlingen about 87.4% of the population (between age 25–64) have completed either non-mandatory upper secondary education or additional higher education (either university or a Fachhochschule). In Rüdlingen, as of 2007, 2.01% of the population attend kindergarten or another pre-school, 6.5% attend a Primary School, 2.63% attend a lower level Secondary School, and 2.01% attend a higher level Secondary School.

As of 2000, 14.3% of the population belonged to the Roman Catholic Church and 68.5% belonged to the Swiss Reformed Church.

The historical population is given in the following table:

year	population
1771	300
1836	652
1850	704
1900	514
1950	370
2000	616

== Sights ==
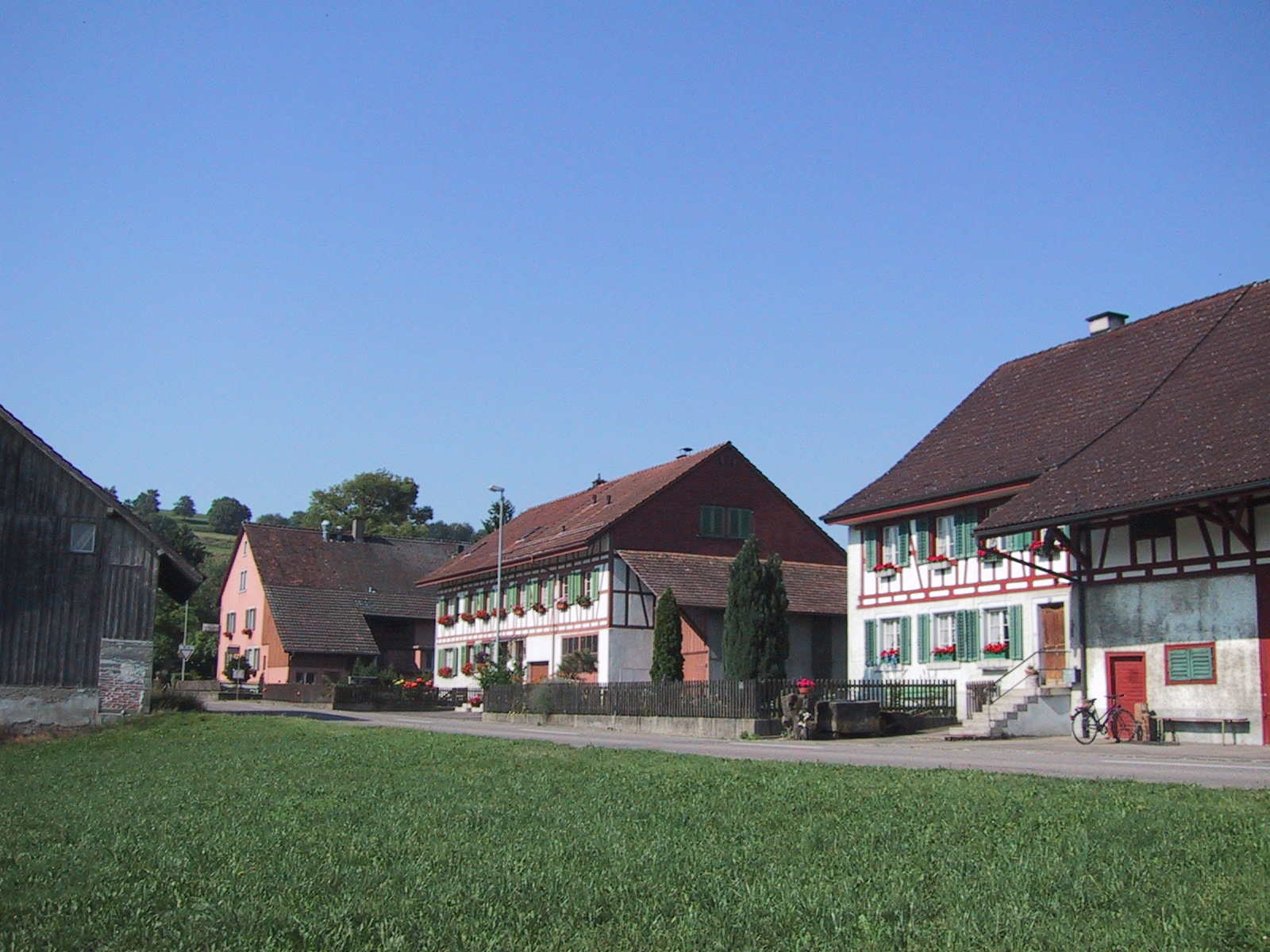
Half timbered houses in Rüdlingen

The village of Rüdlingen with a number of half timbered houses is designated as part of the Inventory of Swiss Heritage Sites.

== Economy ==
Rüdlingen has an unemployment rate (as of 2007 of 0.75%. As of 2005, there were 56 people employed in the primary economic sector and about 19 businesses involved in this sector. 11 people are employed in the secondary sector and there are 7 businesses in this sector. 100 people are employed in the tertiary sector, with 21 businesses in this sector.

As of 2008 the mid year average unemployment rate was 0.7%. There were 34 non-agrarian businesses in the municipality and 19.1% of the (non-agrarian) population was involved in the secondary sector of the economy while 80.9% were involved in the third. At the same time, 55.9% of the working population was employed full-time, and 44.1% was employed part-time. There were 136 residents of the municipality who were employed in some capacity, of which females made up 38.2% of the workforce. As of 2000 there were 102 residents who worked in the municipality, while 223 residents worked outside Rüdlingen and 40 people commuted into the municipality for work.

As of 2008, there are 3 restaurants, and 1 hotel with 68 beds. The hospitality industry in Rüdlingen employs 21 people.
