= Töss (river) =

River in Switzerland

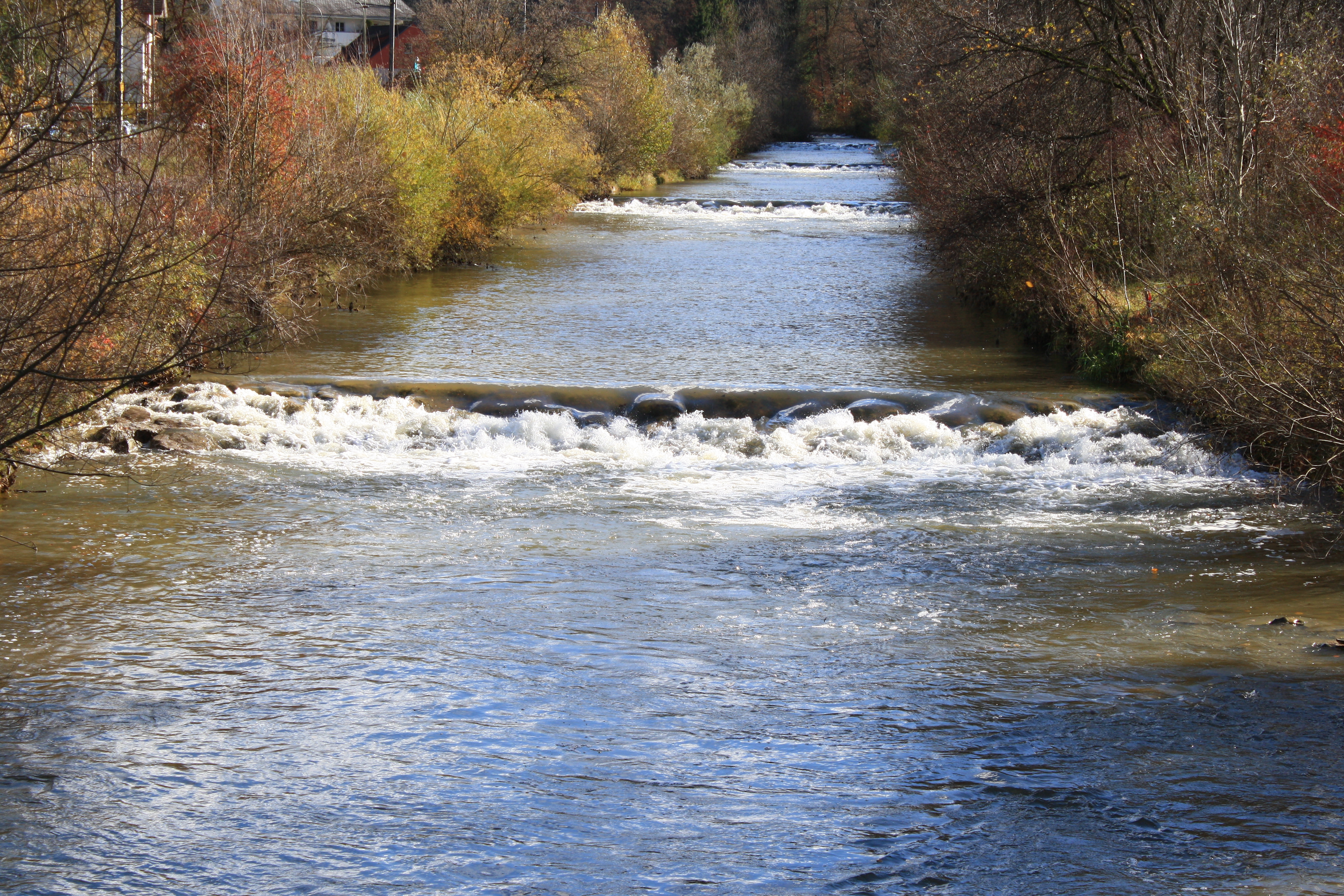
- The Töss in Rikon im Tösstal

Location
- Country: Switzerland
- Canton: Zürich

Physical characteristics
- Source: Confluence of the Vordertöss and Hindertöss
  - location: Tössscheidi, Wald ZH and Fischenthal, ZH, Switzerland
  - coordinates: 47°18′44.4″N 8°57′37.4″E
  - elevation: 796 m (2,612 ft)
- Mouth
  - location: Tössegg, Freienstein-Teufen, ZH, Buchberg, SH, Eglisau, ZH, Switzerland
  - coordinates: 47°33′7.6″N 8°33′14.6″E
  - elevation: 344 m (1,129 ft)
- Length: 56 km (35 mi)
- Basin size: 441.43 km^{2}

Basin features
- Progression: Rhine→ North Sea
- Tributaries
  - left: Vordertöss, Mülibach, Cholerbach, Fischbach, Kempt, Mülibach, Wildbach
  - right: Hintertöss, Brüttentalbach, Fuchslochbach, Tobelbach, Lochbach, Steinenbach, Ägetswilerbach, Sackbach, Chatzenbach, Eulach, Näfbach, Tobelbach, Tüfenbach

The Töss (German pronunciation: [ˈtøːs]) is a river in the Swiss canton of Zürich and a tributary of the High Rhine (Hochrhein). It starts at Tössscheidi, the confluence of the Vordertöss and Hindertöss (whose sources are in the canton of St. Gallen), passes through Winterthur's Töss and Wülflingen districts and ends at Tössegg near Freienstein-Teufen. Two of its main tributaries are the Kempt and Eulach.

== Geography ==
=== Tössscheidi ===
The confluence of the Vordertöss and Hintertöss is called Tössscheidi (lit. 'Töss parting'), which is located at 796 metres (2,612 ft) a.s.l. on the border between the municipalities of Wald and Fischenthal. The confluence lies west of the Dägelschberg (1,267 m (4,157 ft)), east of the Hüttchopf (1,231 m (4,039 ft)), and north of the Tössstock (1,153 m (3,783 ft))).

=== Vordertöss ===
The Vordertöss, or Vordere Töss (lit. 'Anterior Töss'), originates in the canton of St. Gallen. Its source lies south of the Tössstock, on the northern faces of Schwarzenberg (1,293 m (4,242 ft)) and Höchhand (1,314 m (4,311 ft)). It circumvents the Tössstock on its western flank before reaching Tössscheidi.

=== Hintertöss ===
The Hindertöss, or Hintere Töss (lit. 'Posterior Töss'), is the longer of the two tributaries. Its source also lies in the canton of St. Gallen but close to the border with the canton of Zurich. The sources is located below Schindelegg (1,265 m (4,150 ft)) and the southern faces of Schindelberghöchi (1,234 m (4,049 ft)) and Dägelschberg. The Hintertoss' affluent Chreuelbach originates below Höchhand, on the western faces of the Habrütispitz (1,274 m (4,180 ft)) and Rossegg (1,254 m (4,114 ft)). The Hintertöss passes Tössstock on its northern hillside before joining the Vordertöss at Tössscheidi.

=== Course of the Töss ===
Starting at Tössscheidi, the Töss flows towards north. It meets the main valley of its own name, Töss Valley (Tösstal), just south of Steg (the drainage divide between the rivers Töss and Jona is nearby at Gibswil). From Steg, the river turns west, flows through Bauma and then turns north again. West of the village of Turbenthal it runs towards west again, and the valley gets even more ragged than before. Between Steg and Sennhof, the river is followed by the Töss Valley Railway line. The Töss continues south of Eschenberg mountain, Winterthur's Hausberg, before reaching its confluence with the River Kempt. Below, it traverses the city's most western part, just northeast of the Töss, a city mountain. After joining the River Eulach on the western end of Winterthur, the Töss continues for about 11 kilometres (6.8 mi) in a more or less westnorthwestern direction and finally joins the High Rhine at Tössegg, west of Teufen.

Although the High Rhine flows in a mostly westward direction, it flows southward between Schaffhausen and Tössegg. At Tössegg, the Rhine bends sharply towards northwest, passing the village of Tössriederen, and continues westwards again before flowing through Eglisau. The mouth of the Töss lies just a few kilometers south of the mouth of the River Thur. A few kilometers downstream, the River Glatt flows into the High Rhine.

== Name ==
The River Töss was first mentioned around 1483 (das Wasser, genannt die Töss, English: 'the waters named Töss'). Its name probably derives from the German verb tosen (English: to roar). Related toponyms are documented earlier, such as Tössegg (locum dictum Tossegge, 1216), Tössriederen (apud Tossriedern, 1277), and the name "Tösser" (dicti Tösserre, 1267).

== Gallery ==
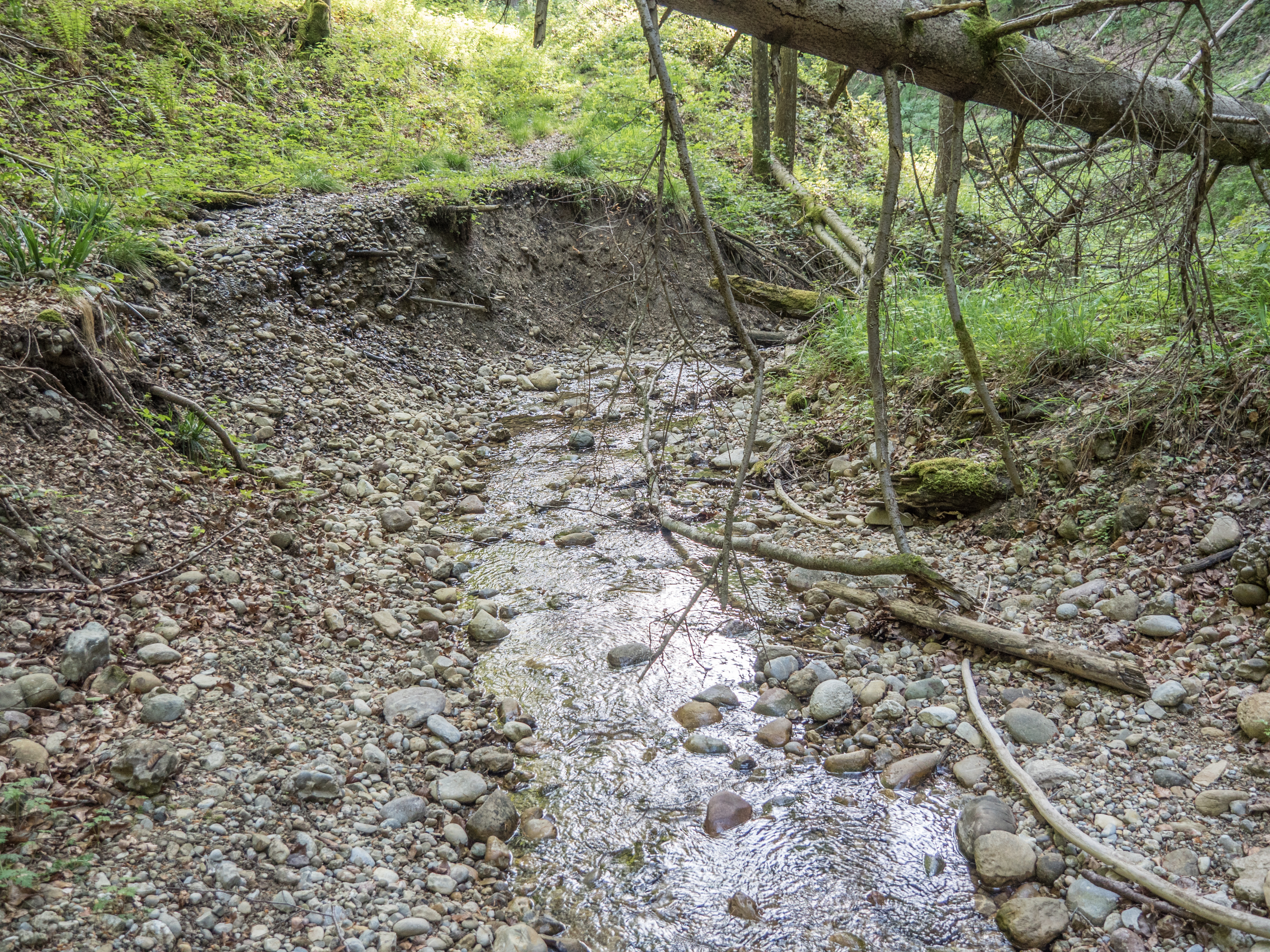
Hintertöss

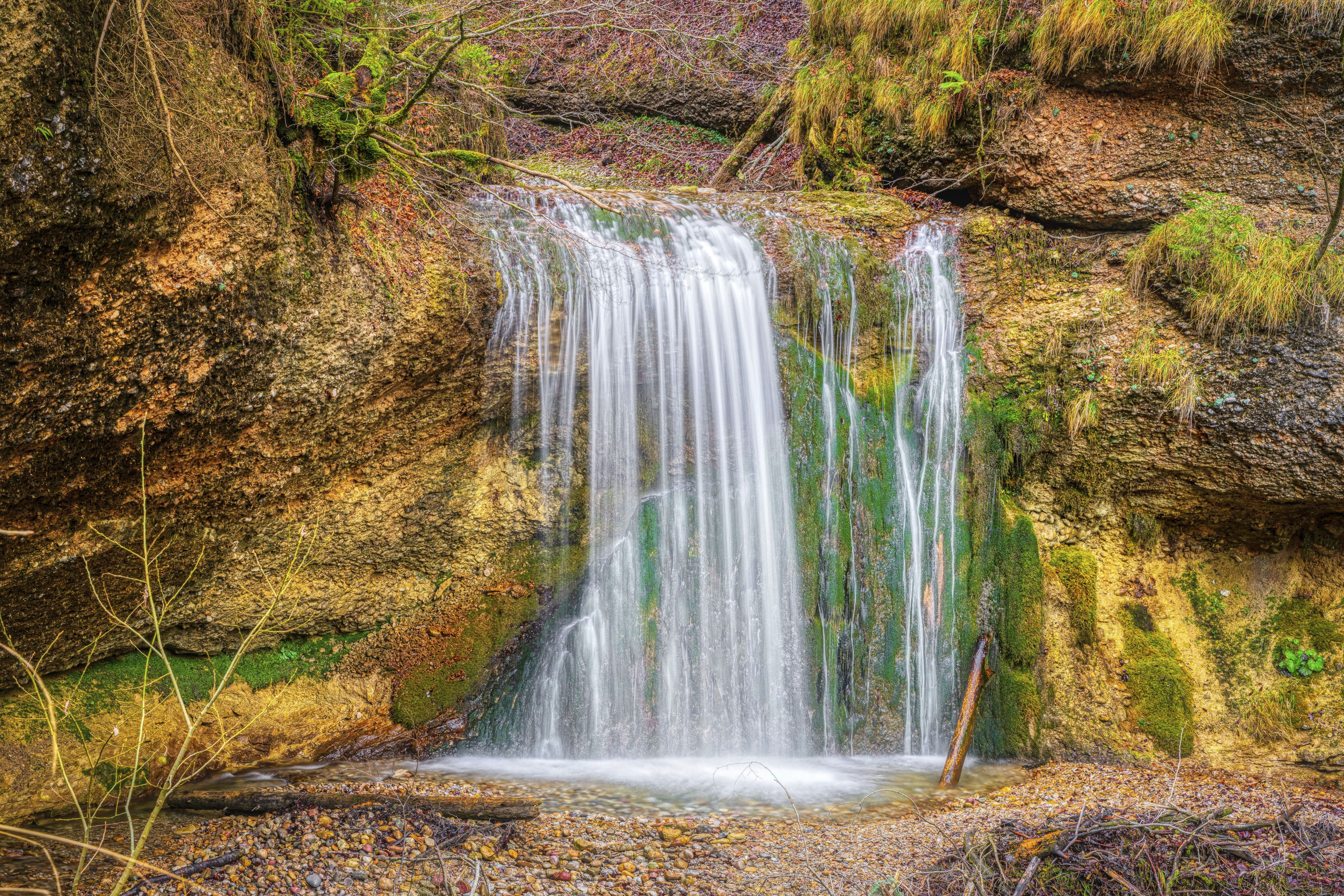
Waterfall of Vordertöss

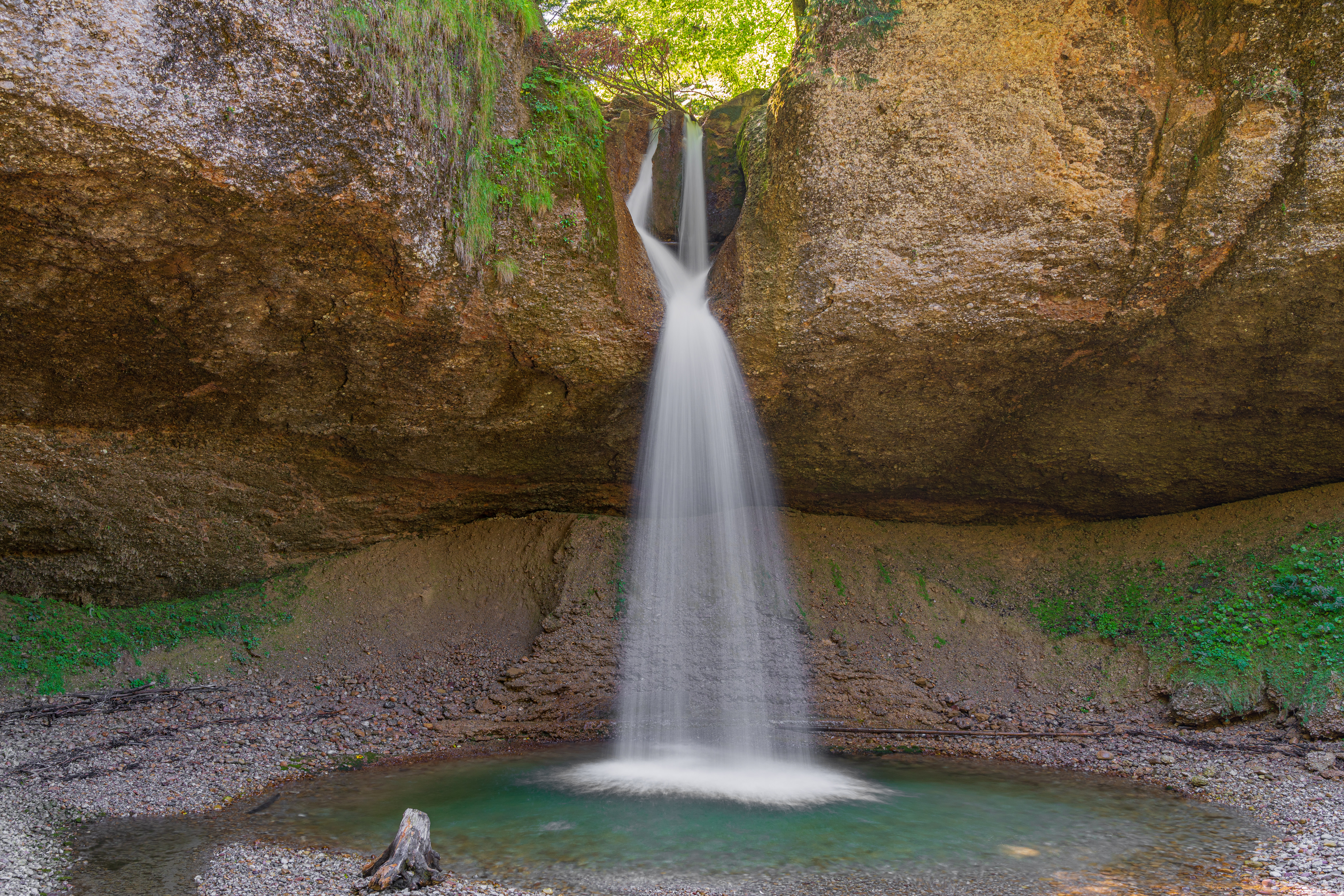
Waterfall Lauf below Tössscheidi

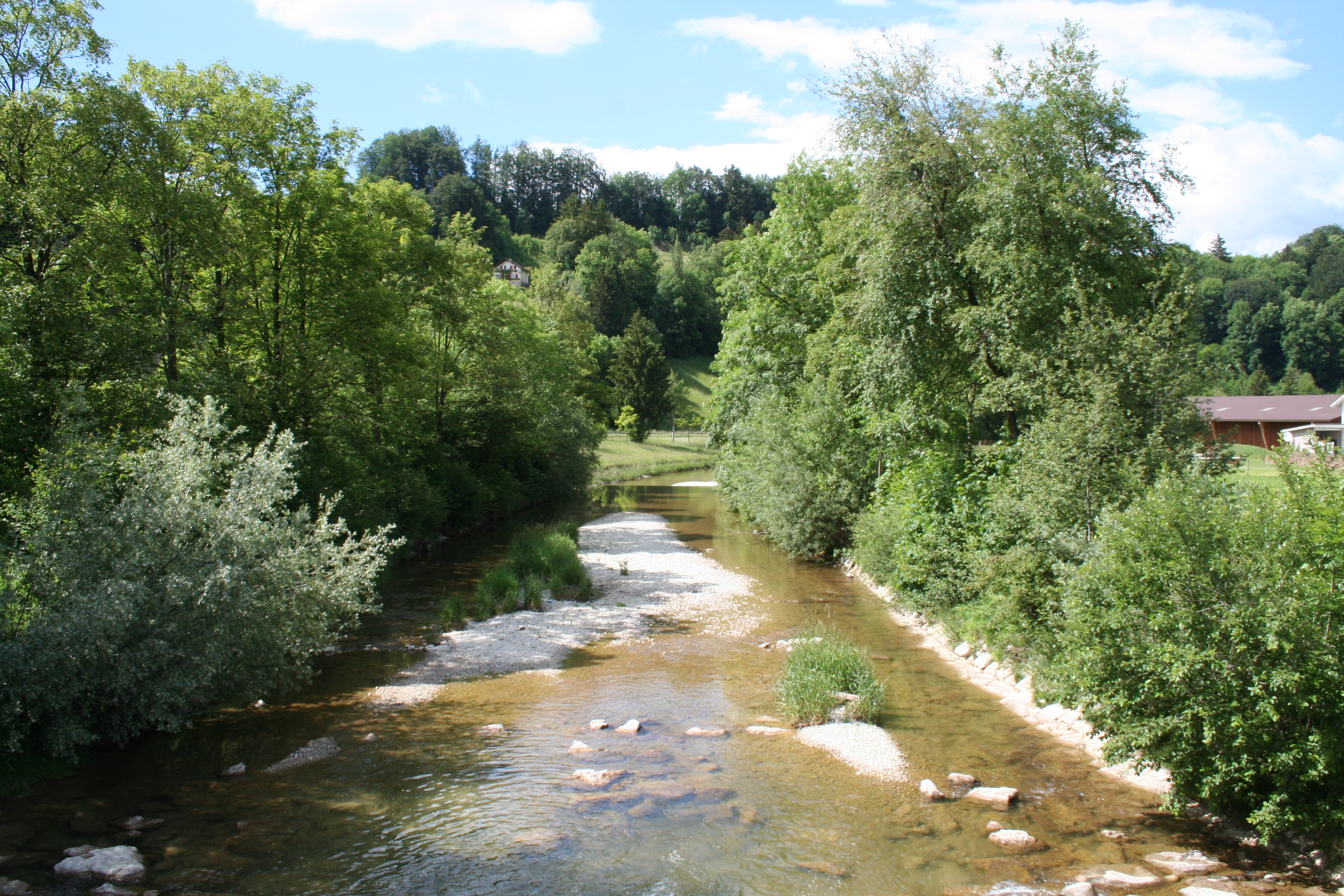
Töss near Bauma

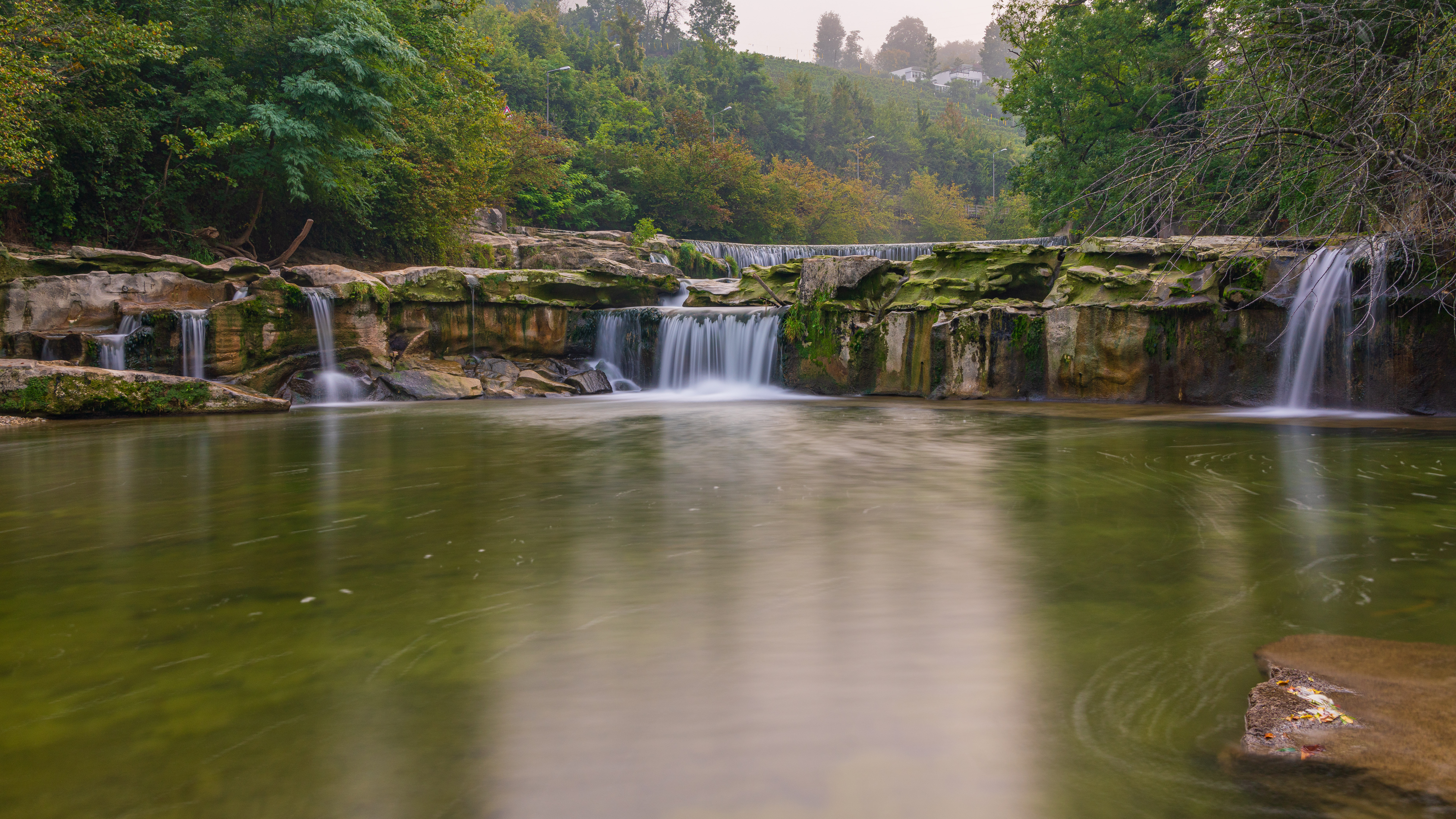
Waterfall near Wülflingen

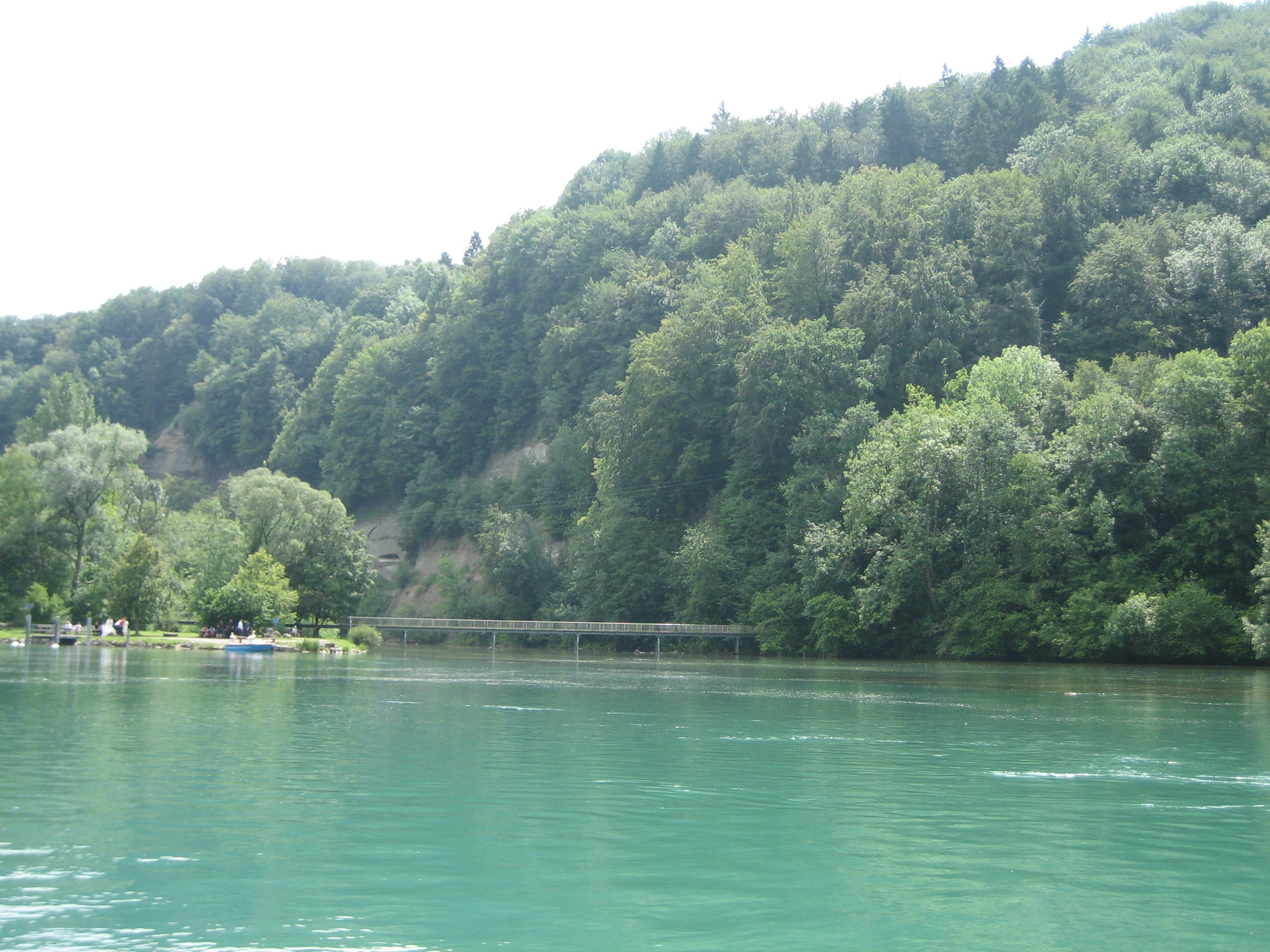
Tössegg, confluence of Töss and High Rhine

== See also ==
- Rivers of Switzerland
- Swiss Prealps
