= Buchberg, Schaffhausen =

Buchberg
- Municipality
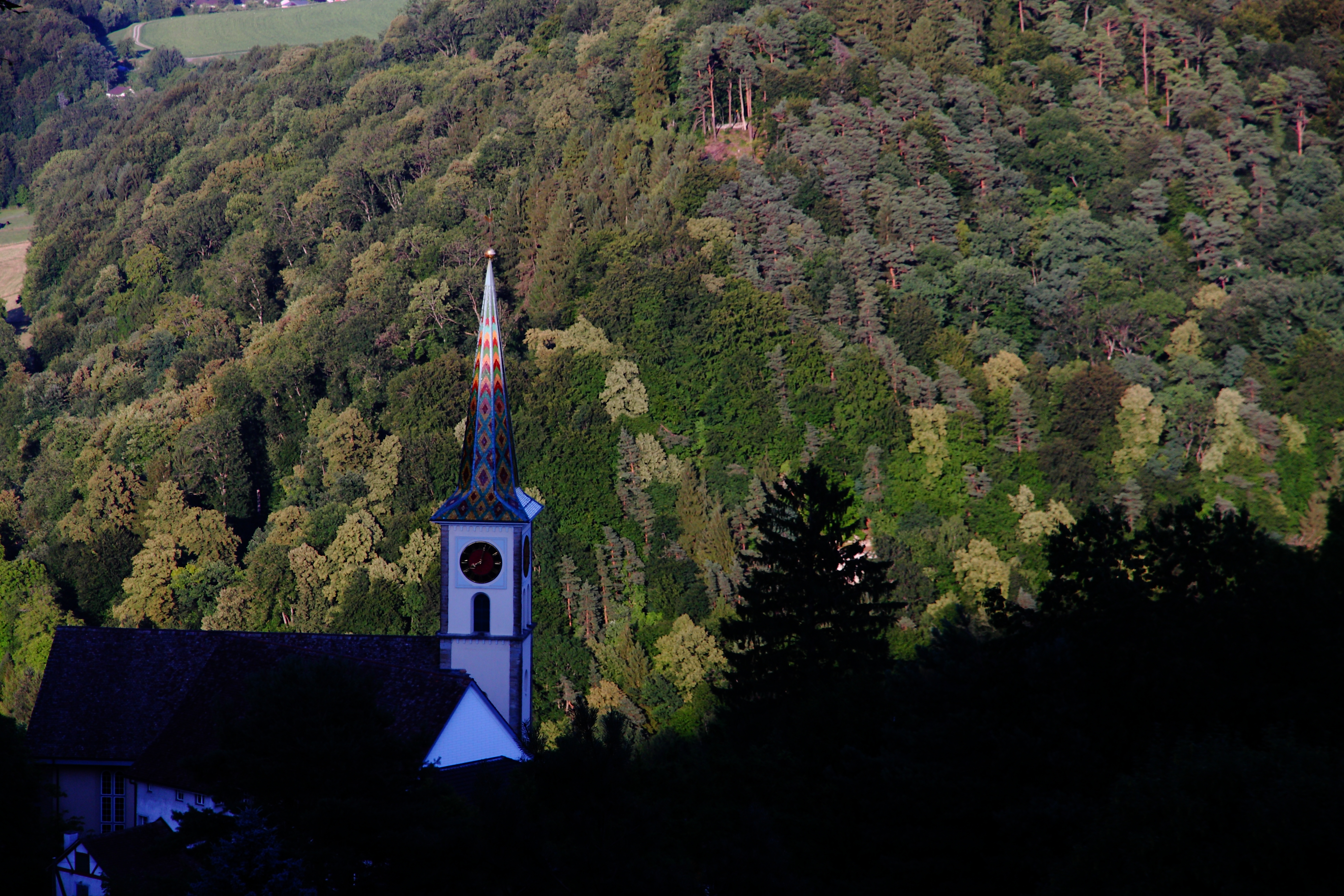

- Flag Coat of arms
- Location of Buchberg
- Location within Switzerland Location within Canton of Schaffhausen
- Coordinates: 47°34′N 8°33′E
- Country: Switzerland
- Canton: Schaffhausen
- District: n.a.

Area
  - Total: 6.04 km^{2} (2.33 sq mi)
- Elevation: 487 m (1,598 ft)

Population (February 2009)
  - Total: 816
  - Density: 135/km^{2} (350/sq mi)
- Time zone: UTC+01:00 (CET)
  - Summer (DST): UTC+02:00 (CEST)
- Postal code: 8454
- SFOS number: 2933
- ISO 3166 code: CH-SH
- Surrounded by: Eglisau (ZH), Flaach (ZH), Freienstein-Teufen (ZH), Marthalen (ZH), Rafz (ZH), Rüdlingen
- Twin towns: Schnaittenbach (Germany)
- Website: buchberg.ch

Buchberg (Swiss Standard German pronunciation: [ˈbuːxˌbɛrɡ]) is a municipality in the canton of Schaffhausen in Switzerland.

With Rüdlingen, Buchberg forms one of the two exclaves of the Canton of Schaffhausen on the Rhine, bordered by the Canton of Zürich and Baden-Württemberg.

== History ==
Aerial view from 200 m by Walter Mittelholzer (1919)

Buchberg is first mentioned around 1111–24 as Bochberg. In 1236 it was mentioned as Buchberge. It was bought by the city of Schaffhausen from Rheinau Abbey in two portions, in 1520 and 1657.

Buchberg municipality was split into Buchberg and Rüdlingen in 1839.

== Coat of arms ==
The blazon of the municipal coat of arms is Gules a Beech Vert trunked proper issuant from Coupeaux of the second. The coat of arms is an example of canting in that the tree is a beech tree (German: Buche) and it stands on a mountain (German: berg).

== Geography ==
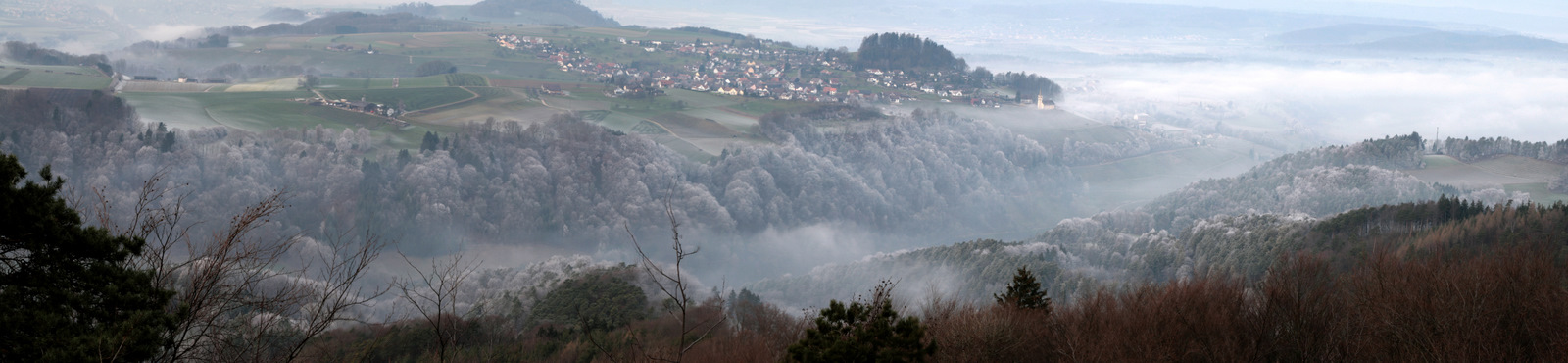
The Rhine Valley around Buchberg, view from the Irchel Hochwacht

Buchberg has an area, as of 2006, of 5.9 km^{2} (2.3 sq mi). Of this area, 52.4% is used for agricultural purposes, while 34.3% is forested. Of the rest of the land, 8.2% is settled (buildings or roads) and the remainder (5.1%) is non-productive (rivers, glaciers or mountains).

The municipality is located in the Schaffhausen district. The exclave municipalities of Rüdlingen and Buchberg are both located on the Hurbig hill above Eglisau and along the Rhine knee.

== Demographics ==
Buchberg has a population (as of 2008) of 811, of which 8.0% are foreign nationals. Of the foreign population, (as of 2008), 45.5% are from Germany, 4.5% are from Italy, 1.5% are from Croatia, 16.7% are from Macedonia, and 31.8% are from another country. Over the last 10 years the population has grown at a rate of 8.1%. Most of the population (as of 2000) speaks German (95.4%), with Albanian being second most common ( 1.4%) and French being third ( 0.8%).

The age distribution of the population (as of 2008) is children and teenagers (0–19 years old) make up 21.3% of the population, while adults (20–64 years old) make up 62.5% and seniors (over 64 years old) make up 16.2%.

In the 2007 federal election the most popular party was the SVP which received 46% of the vote. The next two most popular parties were the SP (31%), and the FDP (23%).

The entire Swiss population is generally well educated. In Buchberg about 86.9% of the population (between age 25–64) have completed either non-mandatory upper secondary education or additional higher education (either university or a Fachhochschule). In Buchberg, as of 2007, 2.1% of the population is attending kindergarten or another pre-school, 7.66% are attending a Primary School, 2.22% attend a lower level Secondary School, and 1.48% attend a higher level Secondary School.

As of 2000, 13% of the population belonged to the Roman Catholic Church and 71.9% belonged to the Swiss Reformed Church.

The historical population is given in the following table:

year	population
1836	605
1850	656
1900	520
1950	398
2000	777

== Sights ==
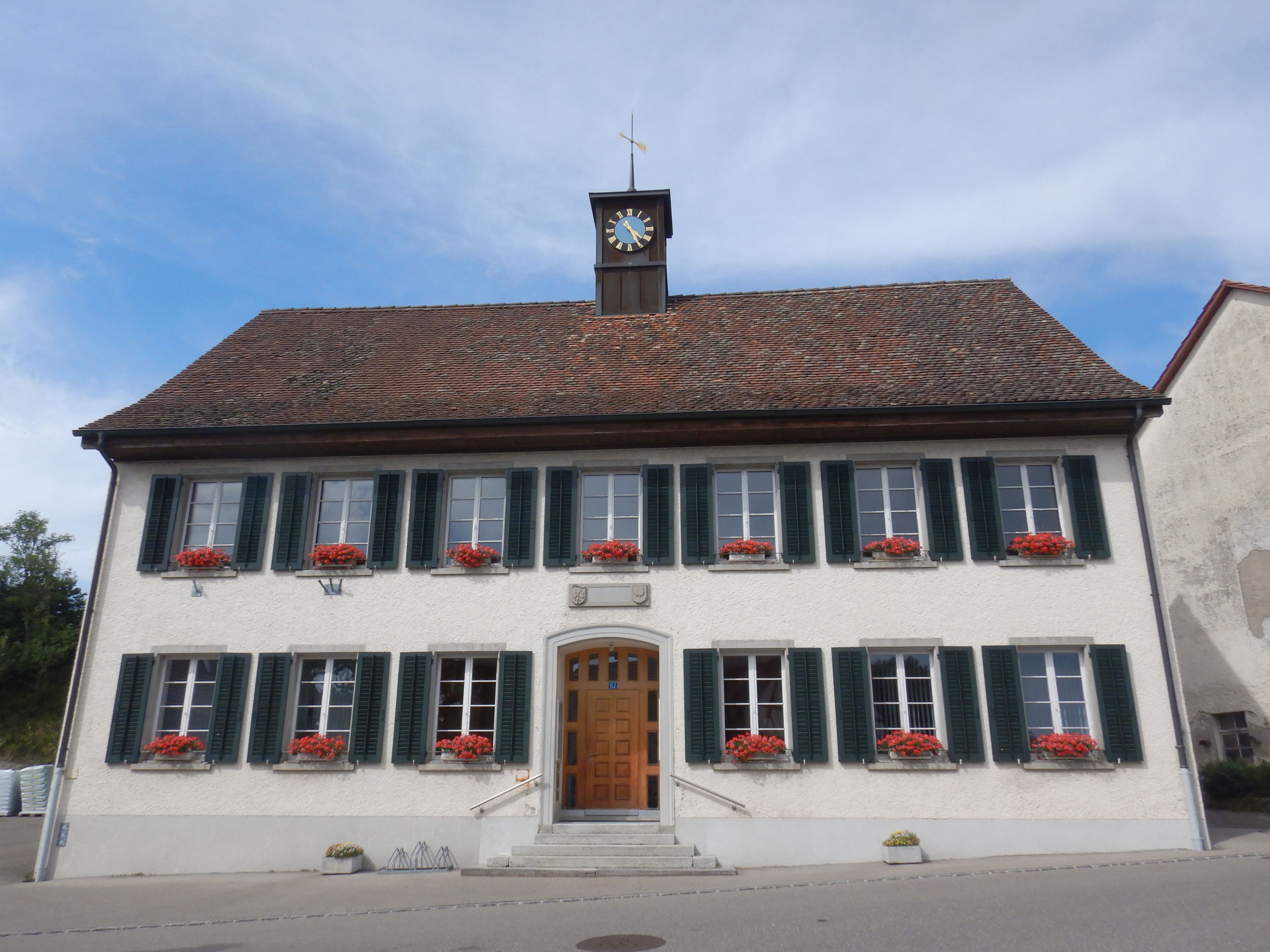
Town hall.

Today's town hall of Buchberg, was built in 1856, and served initially as a school and town hall.

== Employment ==
Buchberg has an unemployment rate of 0.8%. As of 2005, there were 74 people employed in the primary economic sector and about 28 businesses involved in this sector. 43 people are employed in the secondary sector and there are 6 businesses in this sector. 69 people are employed in the tertiary sector, with 26 businesses in this sector.

As of 2008 the mid year average unemployment rate was 0.4%. There were 32 non-agrarian businesses in the municipality and 45.3% of the (non-agrarian) population was involved in the secondary sector of the economy while 54.7% were involved in the third. At the same time, 58.6% of the working population was employed full-time, and 41.4% was employed part-time. There were 128 residents of the municipality were employed in some capacity, of which females made up 47.7% of the workforce. As of 2000 there were 103 residents who worked in the municipality, while 297 residents worked outside Buchberg and 45 people commuted into the municipality for work.

As of 2008, there are 3 restaurants and the hospitality industry in Buchberg employs 18 people.
