= Freienstein-Teufen =

- Municipality
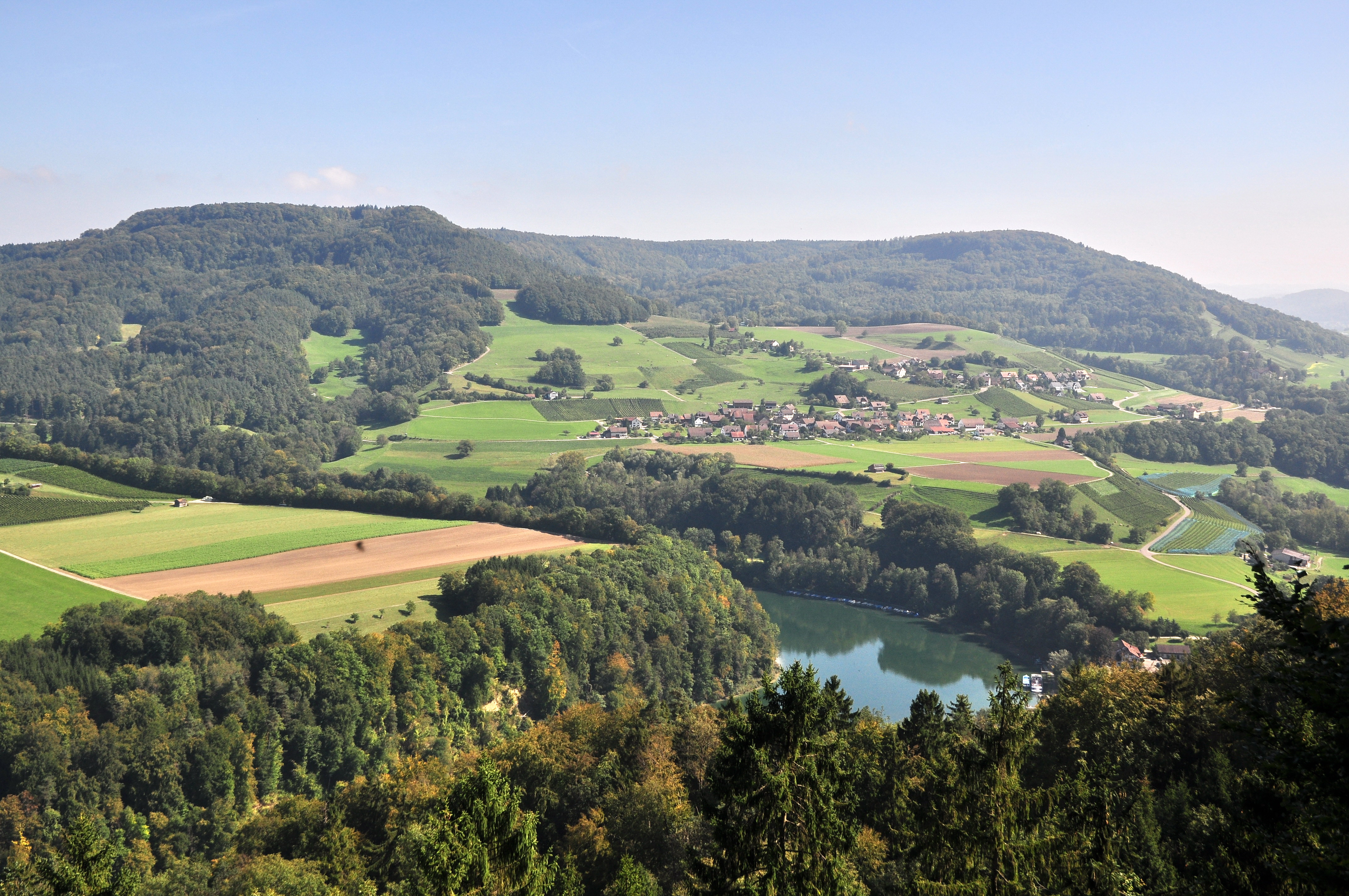

- Flag Coat of arms
- Location of Freienstein-Teufen
- Location within Switzerland Location within Canton of Zurich
- Coordinates: 47°32′N 8°35′E
- Country: Switzerland
- Canton: Zurich
- District: Bülach

Government
  - Mayor: Oliver Müller

Area
  - Total: 8.32 km^{2} (3.21 sq mi)
- Elevation: 420 m (1,380 ft)

Population (December 2020)
  - Total: 2,397
  - Density: 288/km^{2} (746/sq mi)
- Time zone: UTC+01:00 (CET)
  - Summer (DST): UTC+02:00 (CEST)
- Postal code: 8427
- SFOS number: 57
- ISO 3166 code: CH-ZH
- Surrounded by: Berg am Irchel, Buch am Irchel, Buchberg (SH), Dättlikon, Eglisau, Embrach, Rorbas, Rüdlingen (SH)
- Website: www.freienstein-teufen.ch

Freienstein-Teufen is a municipality in the district of Bülach in the canton of Zürich in Switzerland.

== History ==
Aerial view (1948)

Freienstein-Teufen is first mentioned in 890 as Tiuffen. In 1254 it was mentioned as Frigenstein.

== Geography ==
Freienstein-Teufen has an area of 8.3 km^{2} (3.2 sq mi). Of this area, 39.4% is used for agricultural purposes, while 49.6% is forested. Of the rest of the land, 9.2% is settled (buildings or roads) and the remainder (1.8%) is non-productive (rivers, glaciers or mountains).

Situated in the lower Tösstal, bordering on the Rhine, it comprises the villages of Freienstein and Teufen. In 1958, the two villages merged into a single municipality.

== Demographics ==
Freienstein-Teufen has a population (as of 31 December 2020) of 2,397. As of 2007, 11.4% of the population was made up of foreign nationals. Over the last 10 years the population has grown at a rate of 7.3%. Most of the population (as of 2000) speaks German (90.9%), with Italian being second most common ( 2.2%) and Albanian being third ( 1.6%).

In the 2007 election the most popular party was the SVP which received 38.4% of the vote. The next three most popular parties were the CSP (17.3%), the SPS (14.8%) and the Green Party (10.5%).

The age distribution of the population (as of 2000) is children and teenagers (0–19 years old) make up 28.2% of the population, while adults (20–64 years old) make up 63% and seniors (over 64 years old) make up 8.8%. In Freienstein-Teufen about 80.8% of the population (between age 25-64) have completed either non-mandatory upper secondary education or additional higher education (either university or a Fachhochschule).

Freienstein-Teufen has an unemployment rate of 1.61%. As of 2005, there were 84 people employed in the primary economic sector and about 27 businesses involved in this sector. 104 people are employed in the secondary sector and there are 17 businesses in this sector. 225 people are employed in the tertiary sector, with 39 businesses in this sector.

The historical population is given in the following table:

year	population
1634	c. 436
1771	679
1836	788
1850	835
1900	1,301
1950	1,120
1970	1,219
2000	2,127

== Gallery ==
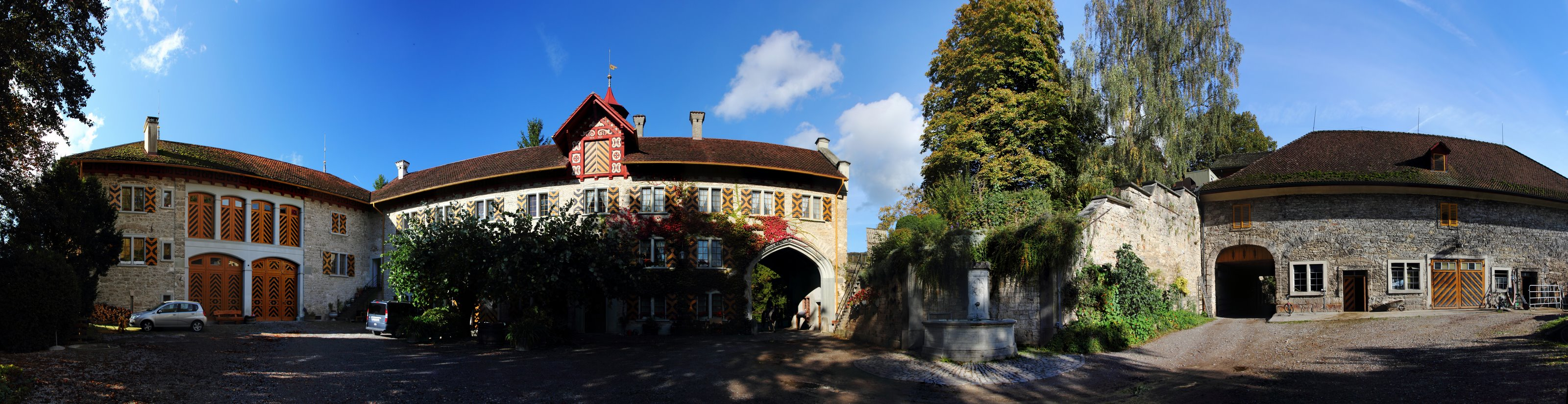
Interior view of the Castle

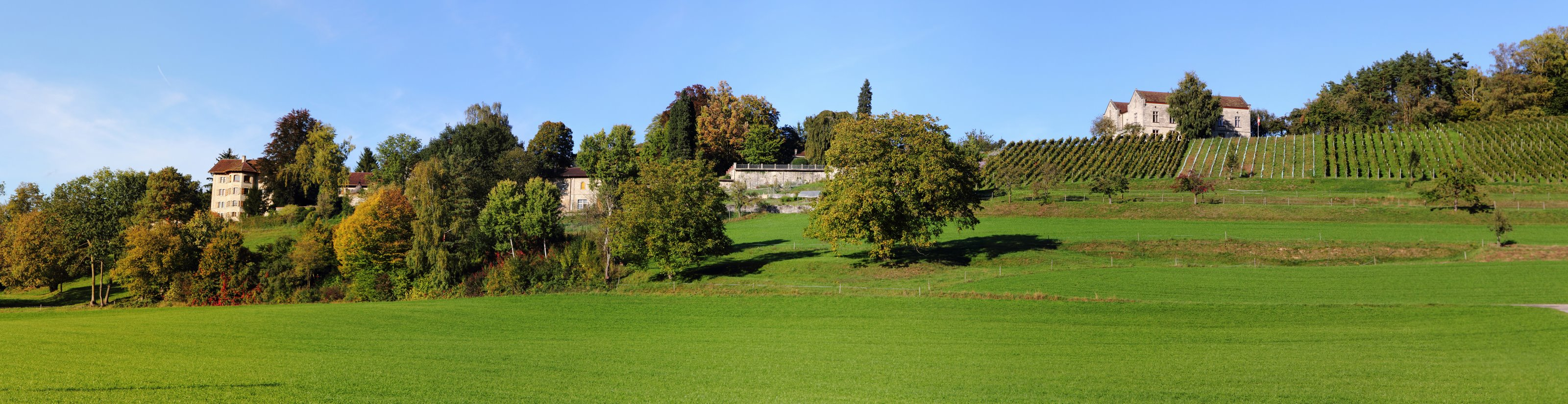
The Castles

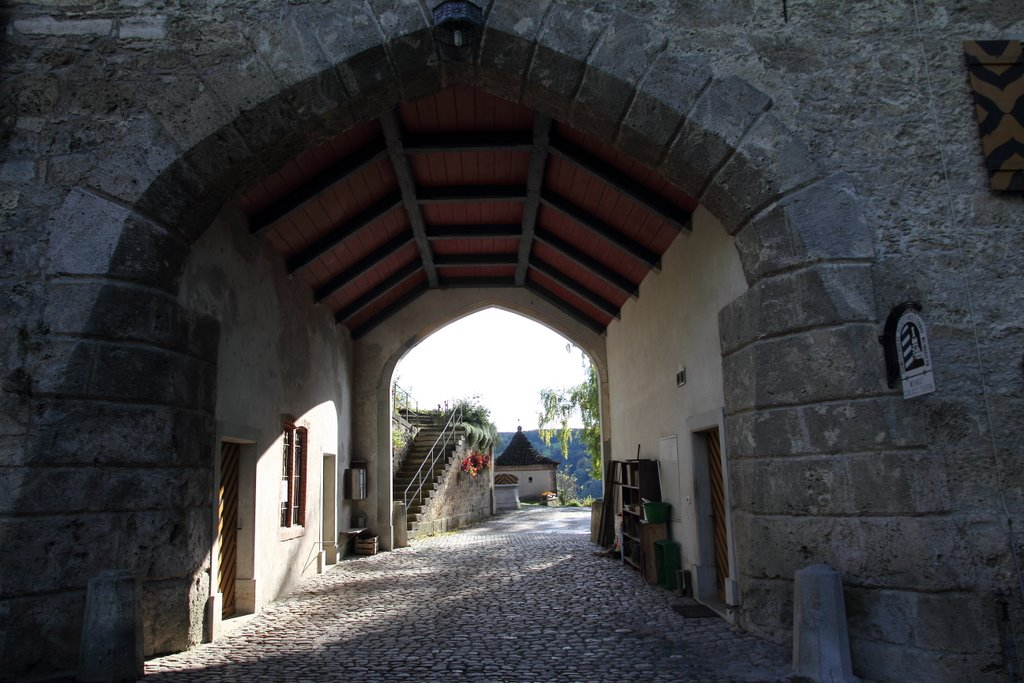
Entrance to the Castle's farm

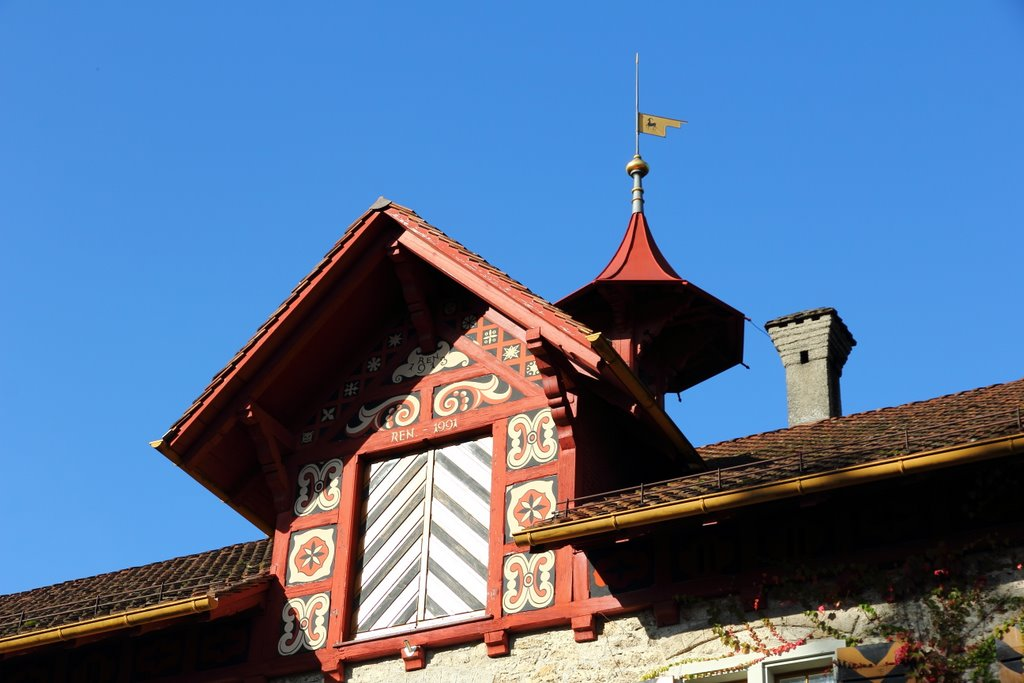
Detail in the Castle's farm
