= Zürcher Oberland =

Highlands in Switzerland

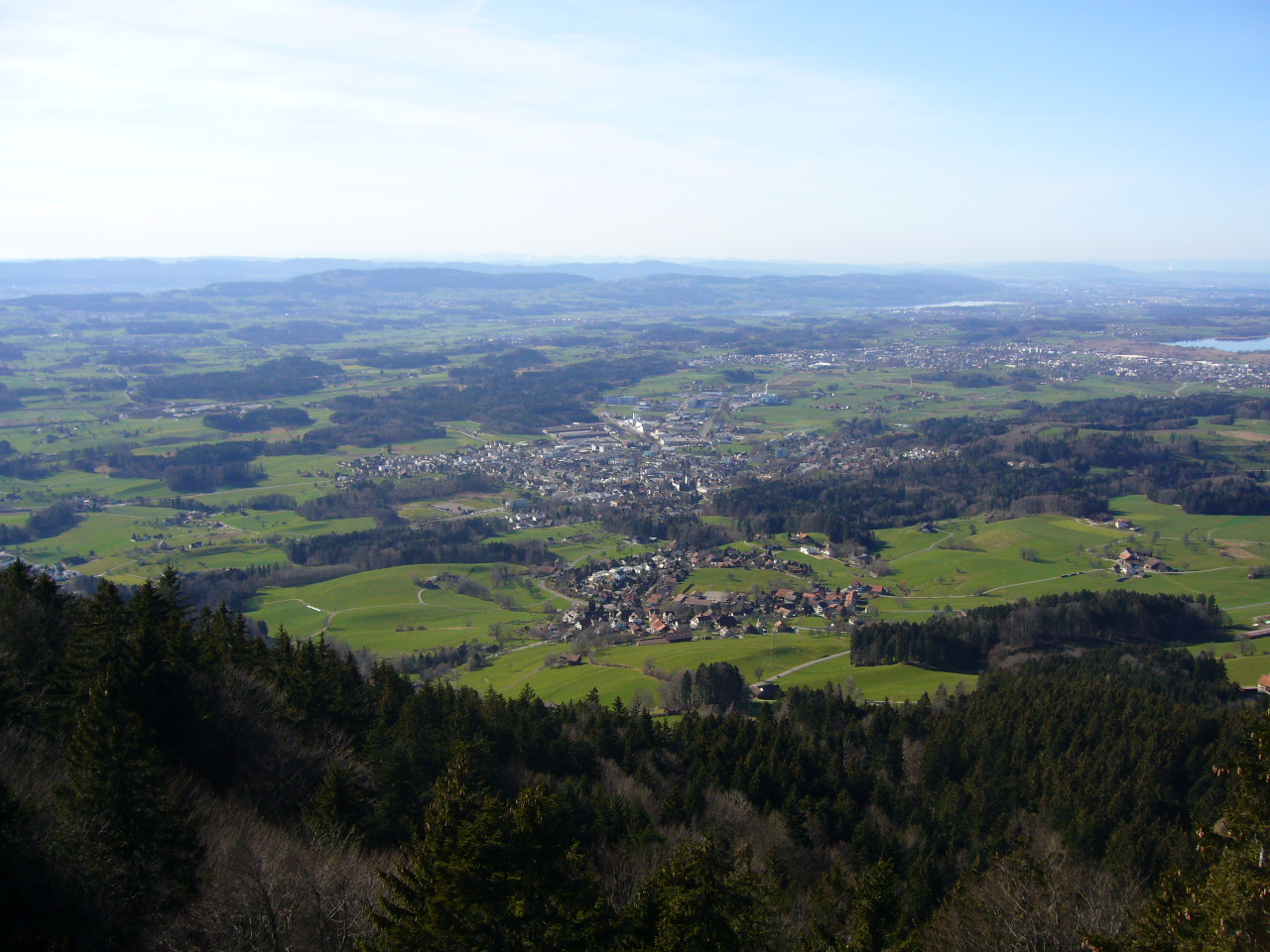
Hinwil, Wetzikon, Pfäffikersee, Greifensee and Pfannstiel in the background as seen from Bachtel mountain

The Zürcher Oberland (Swiss Standard German pronunciation: [ˈtsʏrçər ˈoːbərland], "Zürich highlands") in Switzerland, is the hilly south-eastern part of the canton of Zürich, bordering on the Toggenburg, including the districts of Uster, Hinwil, Pfäffikon as well as the Töss Valley as far as the district of Winterthur.

== History ==
The territory gradually fell under the control of the city of Zürich from 1408 to 1452. In the 18th century, the jurisdiction lay with the reeve of Grüningen for the southern part, and with the reeve of Kyburg for the northern part together with most of the Zürcher Unterland.

== Tourism ==
Notable tourist destinations are primarily hiking and cycling, among many others the Pfäffikersee and Greifensee lakes, Bachtel mountain and Tösstal valley as well as the Pfannenstiel region, Jucker Farm, Aathal Dinosaur Museum, some notable medieval castles (Bubikon, Kyburg, Greifensee, Uster, Rapperswil), the DVZO heritage railway between Hinwil and Bauma, economic history museums and other monuments as well as the nearby Zürichsee region around Rapperswil.

== Municipalities ==
- Bäretswil
- Bauma
- Bubikon
- Dürnten
- Tann
- Fällanden
- Fehraltorf
- Fischenthal
- Gossau
- Greifensee
- Grüningen
- Hinwil
- Hittnau
- Kyburg
- Maur
- Mönchaltorf
- Pfäffikon
- Russikon
- Rüti
- Schlatt bei Winterthur
- Seegräben
- Sternenberg
- Turbenthal
- Uster
- Volketswil
- Wald
- Weisslingen
- Wetzikon
- Wila
- Wildberg
- Zell
