= Pfäffikon =

Pfäffikon may refer to:

- Pfäffikon District, Canton of Zürich, Switzerland
  - Pfäffikon, Zürich (Pfäffikon ZH), a municipality and capital of the district
- Pfäffikon, Schwyz (Pfäffikon SZ), a town within the municipality of Freienbach, Canton of Schwyz, Switzerland

== See also ==
- Pfeffikon (Pfeffikon LU), a municipality in the canton of Lucerne, Switzerland
