= Lindau, Switzerland =

Lindau
- Municipality
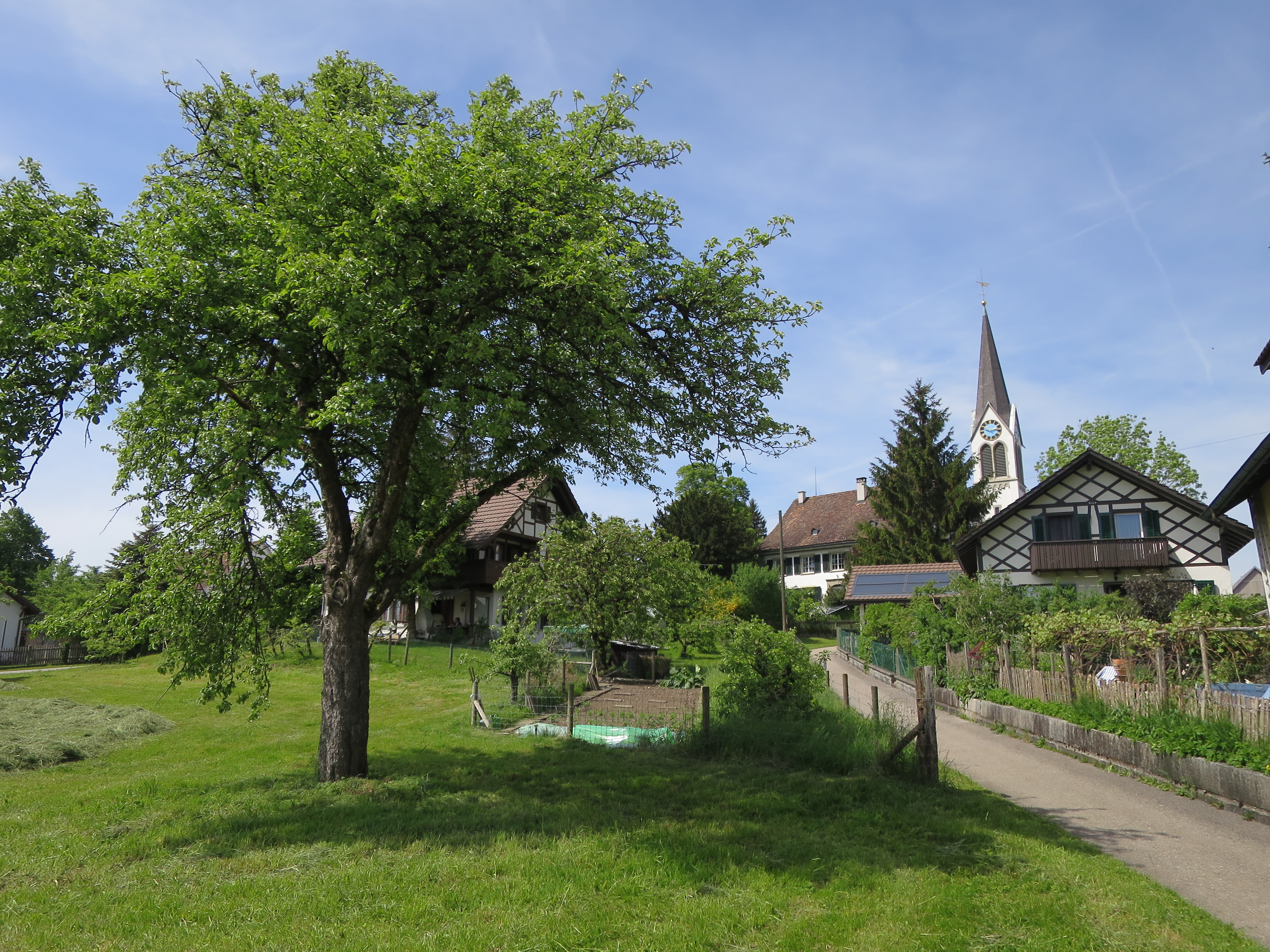

- Flag Coat of arms
- Location of Lindau
- Location within Switzerland Location within Canton of Zurich
- Coordinates: 47°27′N 8°40′E
- Country: Switzerland
- Canton: Zurich
- District: Pfäffikon

Area
  - Total: 11.96 km^{2} (4.62 sq mi)
- Elevation: 519 m (1,703 ft)

Population (December 2020)
  - Total: 5,585
  - Density: 467.0/km^{2} (1,209/sq mi)
- Time zone: UTC+01:00 (CET)
  - Summer (DST): UTC+02:00 (CEST)
- Postal code: 8315
- SFOS number: 176
- ISO 3166 code: CH-ZH
- Surrounded by: Bassersdorf, Brütten, Illnau-Effretikon, Nürensdorf, Volketswil, Wangen-Brüttisellen, Winterthur
- Website: www.lindau.ch

Lindau (German pronunciation: [ˈlɪndaʊ]) is a municipality in the district of Pfäffikon in the canton of Zürich in Switzerland.

== History ==
Aerial view (1953)

Lindau is first mentioned in 774 as Lintauvia.

== Geography ==
Lindau has an area of 11.9 km^{2} (4.6 sq mi). Of this area, 47.4% is used for agricultural purposes, while 34% is forested. Of the rest of the land, 18.2% is settled (buildings or roads) and the remainder (0.3%) is non-productive (rivers, glaciers or mountains). In 1996 housing and buildings made up 9% of the total area, while transportation infrastructure made up the rest (9.1%). Of the total unproductive area, water (streams and lakes) made up 0.2% of the area. As of 2007 13.7% of the total municipal area was undergoing some type of construction.

The municipality is located in the western portion of the lower Kempt valley. It includes the villages of Lindau, Tagelswangen, Winterberg and Grafstal.

== Demographics ==
Lindau has a population (as of 31 December 2020) of 5,585. As of 2007, 18.3% of the population was made up of foreign nationals. As of 2008 the gender distribution of the population was 51% male and 49% female. Over the last 10 years the population has grown at a rate of 33%. Most of the population (as of 2000) speaks German (85.6%), with Italian being second most common ( 3.7%) and Serbo-Croatian being third ( 3.0%).

In the 2007 election the most popular party was the SVP which received 40% of the vote. The next three most popular parties were the SPS (14.5%), the FDP (11.7%) and the CSP (11.1%).

The age distribution of the population (as of 2000) is children and teenagers (0–19 years old) make up 26.7% of the population, while adults (20–64 years old) make up 63.9% and seniors (over 64 years old) make up 9.4%. The entire Swiss population is generally well educated. In Lindau about 76.7% of the population (between age 25–64) have completed either non-mandatory upper secondary education or additional higher education (either university or a Fachhochschule). There are 1545 households in Lindau.

Lindau has an unemployment rate of 2.39%. As of 2005, there were 101 people employed in the primary economic sector and about 29 businesses involved in this sector. 791 people are employed in the secondary sector and there are 51 businesses in this sector. 1044 people are employed in the tertiary sector, with 136 businesses in this sector. As of 2007 47.1% of the working population were employed full-time, and 52.9% were employed part-time.

As of 2008 there were 1240 Catholics and 2159 Protestants in Lindau. In the 2000 census, religion was broken down into several smaller categories. From the census, 50.4% were some type of Protestant, with 45.9% belonging to the Swiss Reformed Church and 4.4% belonging to other Protestant churches. 25.3% of the population were Catholic. Of the rest of the population, 0% were Muslim, 11.2% belonged to another religion (not listed), 2.9% did not give a religion, and 9.7% were atheist or agnostic.

The historical population is given in the following table:

year	population
1467	c. 125
1634	281
1792	900
1850	1,051
1900	1,627
1950	1,833
2000	4,072

== Transport ==
The municipality of Lindau is served by Kemptthal railway station, which is on the Zurich to Winterthur main line and is served by Zurich S-Bahn service S7.
