= Winterberg, Switzerland =

Winterberg
- Municipality
- Coat of arms
- Location of Winterberg
- Location within Switzerland Location within Canton of Zürich
- Coordinates: 47°27′N 8°41′E
- Country: Switzerland
- Canton: Zürich
- District: Pfäffikon District
- Municipality: Lindau, Switzerland
- Elevation: 555 m (1,821 ft)

Population (1 January 2016)
  - Total: 902
- Time zone: UTC+01:00 (CET)
  - Summer (DST): UTC+02:00 (CEST)
- Postal code: 8312
- ISO 3166 code: CH-ZH
- Website: http://www.lindau.ch/de/

Winterberg is a village in the municipality of Lindau in Pfäffikon District, canton of Zürich in Switzerland.

Its coat of arms is a blazon: three times six piled balls in a triangle

== Geography ==
Aerial view (1966)

The locality Winterberg is the topographically highest township of Lindau. There some traditional farmers in the village, and in the early 1930s the first one-family houses were built. Until today the building activity has been continued on a moderate speed.

== Population ==
Winterberg as of 1 January 2016 has a population of 902 people, who mainly live in owner-occupied houses.

Year	Total
01.01.2016	902
01.01.2015	915
01.01.2014	901
01.01.2013	917
01.01.2012	910
01.01.2011	905
01.01.2010	919
01.01.2009	931
01.01.2008	937
01.01.2007	934
01.01.2006	937

== Sources ==
www.lindau.ch
