= Züriputsch =

Attempted coup d'état in Switzerland, 1839

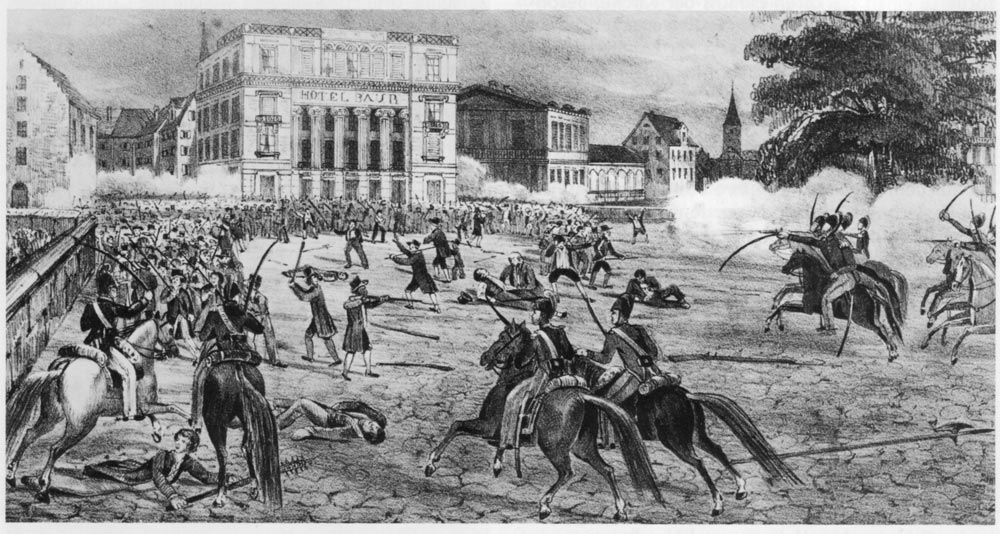
Fighting on the Paradeplatz (Lithography, Zentralbibliothek Zürich)

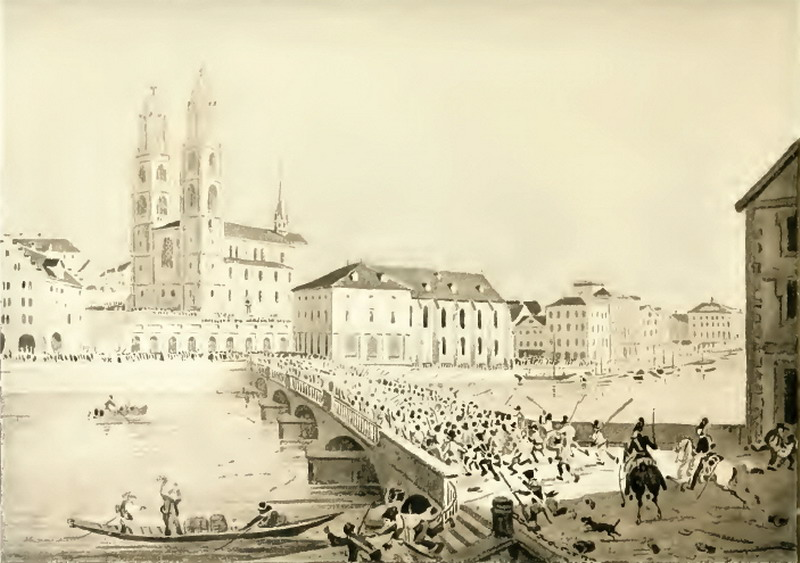
Kolonne Ralin retreating from Münsterhof square towards (as of today) Limmatquai, Grossmünster and Wasserkirche (to the right) in the background.

The Züriputsch of 6 September 1839 was a putsch of the rural conservative population against the liberal rule of the city of Zurich on the eve of the formation of the Swiss federal state. The reason for the putsch was the appointment of the controversial German theologian David Strauss to the theological faculty of the University of Zurich by the liberal government. The rural population saw the old religious order in danger.

== Events ==
Led by Bernhard Hirzel, pastor of Pfäffikon, several thousand putschists stormed the city from the west, and fought the cantonal troops in the alleys between Paradeplatz and Fraumünster. Botanist and councillor Johannes Jacob Hegetschweiler was shot in the head as he was acting as a mediator between the city's council and the insurgents. He died three days later.

The Swiss German term putsch, originally referring to any sort of hit, stroke or collision, entered the German language as a political term, popularized by Gottfried Keller. The word gained further use during the First World War, as the equivalent of the English "push," to mean "going over the top" from a trench into no man's land. The derived verb aufputschen remains common in Standard German for "to incite", "to excite", in political or in doping contexts.

== See also ==
- History of Zurich
