= Hittnau =

- Municipality
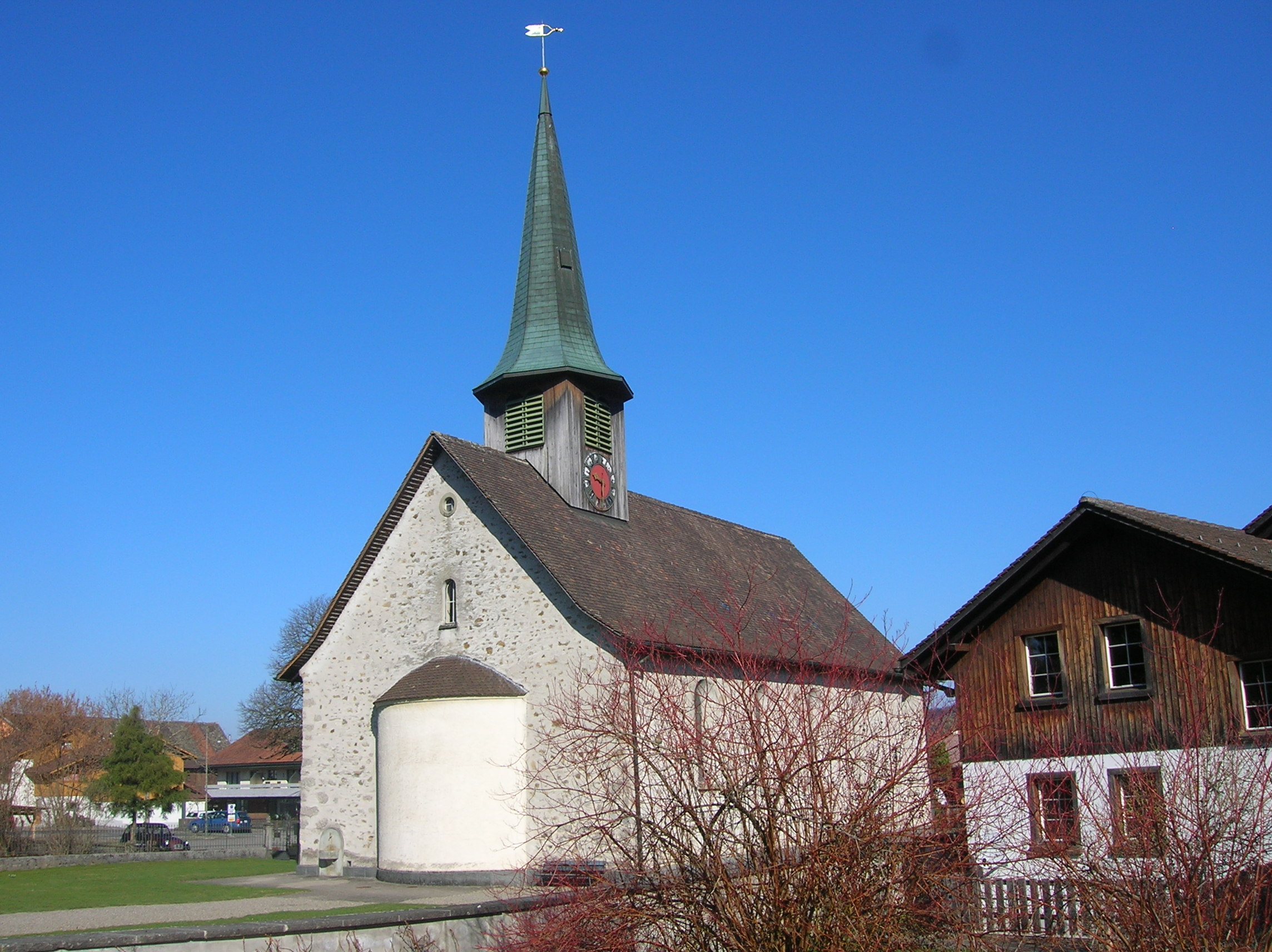

- Flag Coat of arms
- Location of Hittnau
- Location within Switzerland Location within Canton of Zurich
- Coordinates: 47°22′N 8°49′E
- Country: Switzerland
- Canton: Zurich
- District: Pfäffikon

Area
  - Total: 12.92 km^{2} (4.99 sq mi)
- Elevation: 640 m (2,100 ft)

Population (December 2020)
  - Total: 3,733
  - Density: 288.9/km^{2} (748.3/sq mi)
- Time zone: UTC+01:00 (CET)
  - Summer (DST): UTC+02:00 (CEST)
- Postal code: 8335
- SFOS number: 173
- ISO 3166 code: CH-ZH
- Surrounded by: Bäretswil, Bauma, Pfäffikon
- Website: www.hittnau.ch

Hittnau (German pronunciation: [ˈhɪtnaʊ]) is a municipality in the district of Pfäffikon in the canton of Zürich in Switzerland.

== History ==
Hittnau is first mentioned in 905 as Hittenouva.

== Geography ==
Aerial view from 300 m by Walter Mittelholzer (1922)

Hittnau has an area of 13 km^{2} (5.0 sq mi). Of this area, 50% is used for agricultural purposes, while 37.5% is forested. Of the rest of the land, 11.8% is settled (buildings or roads) and the remainder (0.7%) is non-productive (rivers, glaciers or mountains). In 1996 housing and buildings made up 7.6% of the total area, while transportation infrastructure made up the rest (4.2%). Of the total unproductive area, water (streams and lakes) made up 0.4% of the area. As of 2007 6.1% of the total municipal area was undergoing some type of construction.

The municipality is located between the Pfäffikon and Tösstal valleys. It includes the settlements of Ober- and Unterhittnau, Dürstelen, Isikon, Hasel, Schönau and Hofhalden.

== Demographics ==
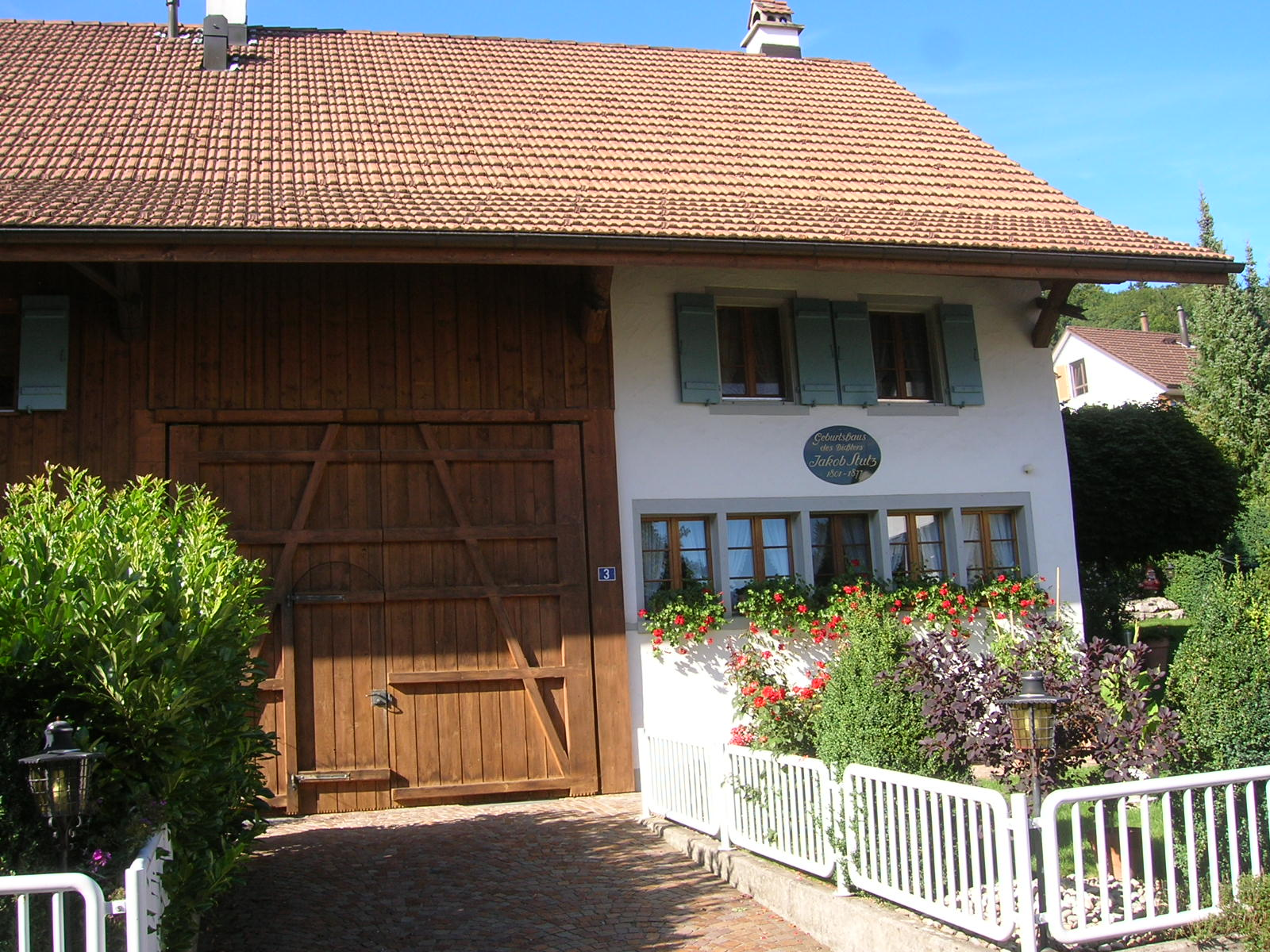
Birthplace of Jakob Stutz, 18th Century Zurich German author, in Hittnau

Hittnau has a population (as of 31 December 2020) of 3,733. As of 2007, 7.0% of the population was made up of foreign nationals. As of 2008 the gender distribution of the population was 49.8% male and 50.2% female. Over the last 10 years the population has grown at a rate of 21.4%. Most of the population (as of 2000) speaks German (95.2%), with Italian being second most common ( 0.9%) and French being third ( 0.7%).

In the 2007 election the most popular party was the SVP which received 40.9% of the vote. The next three most popular parties were the SPS (13.4%), the CSP (12.9%) and the FDP (10.2%).

The age distribution of the population (as of 2000) is children and teenagers (0–19 years old) make up 29.9% of the population, while adults (20–64 years old) make up 62.2% and seniors (over 64 years old) make up 8%. The entire Swiss population is generally well educated. In Hittnau about 85.4% of the population (between age 25-64) have completed either non-mandatory upper secondary education or additional higher education (either university or a Fachhochschule). There are 1151 households in Hittnau.

Hittnau has an unemployment rate of 1.47%. As of 2005, there were 89 people employed in the primary economic sector and about 34 businesses involved in this sector. 310 people are employed in the secondary sector and there are 56 businesses in this sector. 268 people are employed in the tertiary sector, with 82 businesses in this sector. As of 2007 42.3% of the working population were employed full-time, and 57.7% were employed part-time.

As of 2008 there were 715 Catholics and 1867 Protestants in Hittnau. In the 2000 census, religion was broken down into several smaller categories. From the census, 64.1% were some type of Protestant, with 59.4% belonging to the Swiss Reformed Church and 4.7% belonging to other Protestant churches. 20.5% of the population were Catholic. Of the rest of the population, 0% were Muslim, 1.8% belonged to another religion (not listed), 2.1% did not give a religion, and 11.2% were atheist or agnostic.

The historical population is given in the following table:

year	population
1467	c. 165
1634	422
1762	1,300
1836	1,983
1850	1,817
1900	1,338
1910	1,255
1950	1,320
1980	1,347
2000	2,965
