= Russikon =

- Municipality
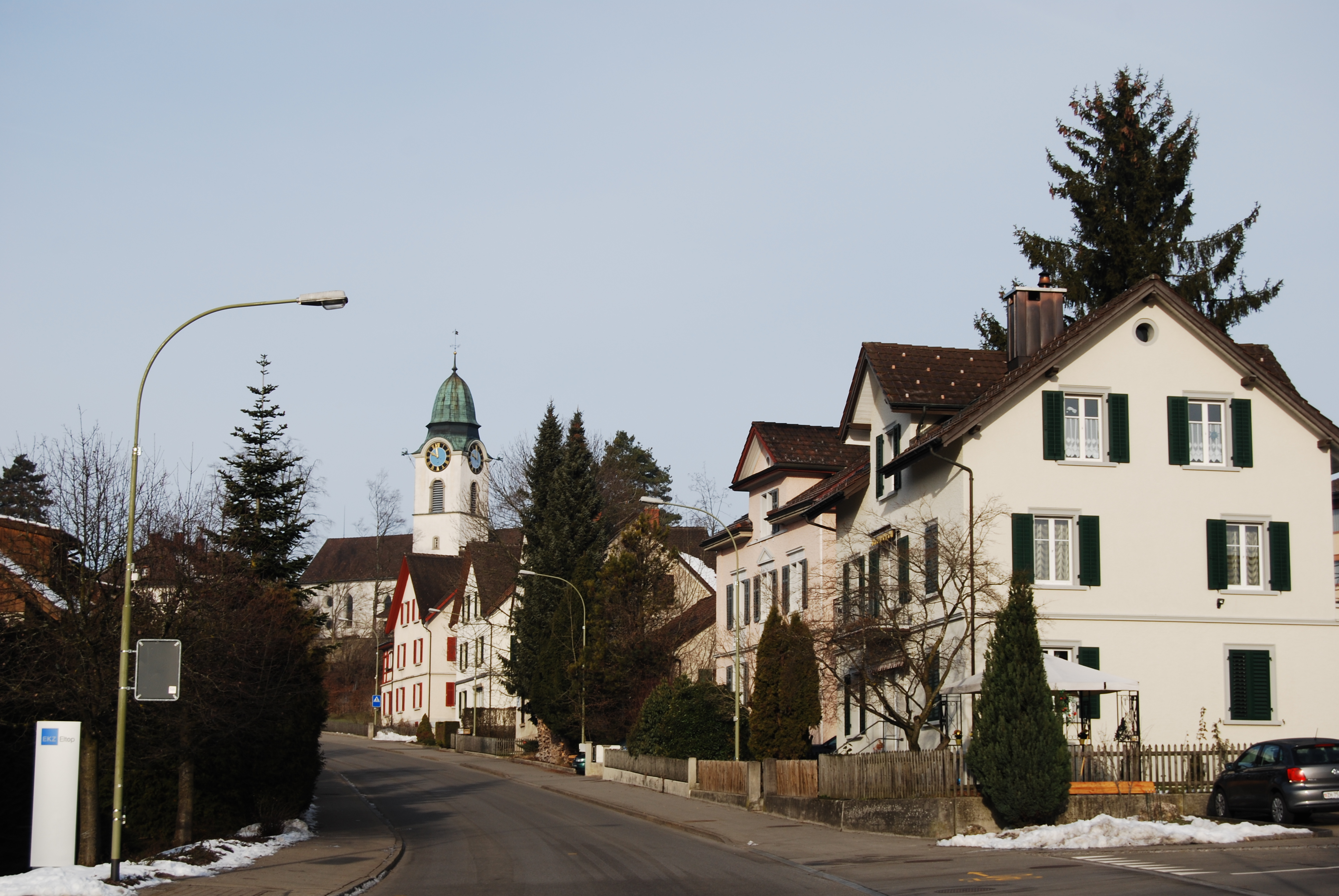

- Flag Coat of arms
- Location of Russikon
- Location within Switzerland Location within Canton of Zurich
- Coordinates: 47°24′N 8°47′E
- Country: Switzerland
- Canton: Zurich
- District: Pfäffikon

Area
  - Total: 14.37 km^{2} (5.55 sq mi)
- Elevation: 608 m (1,995 ft)

Population (December 2020)
  - Total: 4,410
  - Density: 307/km^{2} (795/sq mi)
- Time zone: UTC+01:00 (CET)
  - Summer (DST): UTC+02:00 (CEST)
- Postal code: 8332
- SFOS number: 178
- ISO 3166 code: CH-ZH
- Surrounded by: Fehraltorf, Illnau-Effretikon, Pfäffikon, Weisslingen, Wildberg
- Website: www.russikon.ch

Russikon is a municipality in the district of Pfäffikon in the canton of Zürich in Switzerland.

== History ==
Russikon is first mentioned in 775 as Ruadgisinchova. In 1247 it was mentioned as Rusinchon.

== Geography ==
Russikon has an area of 14.3 km^{2} (5.5 sq mi). Of this area, 51.4% is used for agricultural purposes, while 36.9% is forested. Of the rest of the land, 11.1% is settled (buildings or roads) and the remainder (0.6%) is non-productive (rivers, glaciers or mountains). In 1996 housing and buildings made up 7.8% of the total area, while transportation infrastructure made up the rest (3.2%). Of the total unproductive area, water (streams and lakes) made up 0.1% of the area. As of 2007 9.2% of the total municipal area was undergoing some type of construction.

Aerial view from 200 m by Walter Mittelholzer (1920)

== Demographics ==
Russikon has a population (as of 31 December 2020) of 4,410. As of 2007, 10.0% of the population was made up of foreign nationals. As of 2008 the gender distribution of the population was 49.5% male and 50.5% female. Over the last 10 years the population has grown at a rate of 4.2%. Most of the population (as of 2000) speaks German (93.0%), with Albanian being second most common (1.3%) and Italian being third (1.1%).

In the 2007 election, the most popular party was the SVP which received 45.1% of the vote. The next three most popular parties were the FDP (13.6%), the SPS (12.5%) and the CSP (11.8%).

The age distribution of the population (as of 2000) is children and teenagers (0–19 years old) make up 27.1% of the population, while adults (20–64 years old) make up 61.3% and seniors (over 64 years old) make up 11.6%. In Russikon about 83.7% of the population (between age 25-64) have completed either non-mandatory upper secondary education or additional higher education (either university or a Fachhochschule). There are 1,483 households in Russikon.

Russikon has an unemployment rate of 1.56%. As of 2005, there were 96 people employed in the primary economic sector and about 34 businesses involved in this sector. 307 people are employed in the secondary sector and there are 44 businesses in this sector. 537 people are employed in the tertiary sector, with 118 businesses in this sector. As of 2007, 48.2% of the working population were employed full-time, and 51.8% were employed part-time.

As of 2008, there were 878 Catholics and 2108 Protestants in Russikon. In the 2000 census, religion was broken down into several smaller categories. From the census, 60.2% were some type of Protestant, with 55.1% belonging to the Swiss Reformed Church and 5.1% belonging to other Protestant churches. 21% of the population were Catholic. Of the rest of the population, 0% were Muslim, 4.5% belonged to another religion (not listed), 2.6% did not give a religion, and 11.4% were atheist or agnostic.

The historical population is given in the following table:

Year	Population
1467	32 households
1634	512
1710	981
1850	1,876
1900	1,272
1950	1,358
1980	2,810
2000	3,952
2020	4,410
