= Ludwig Zehnder =

Swiss physicist (1854–1949)

Ludwig Louis Albert Zehnder
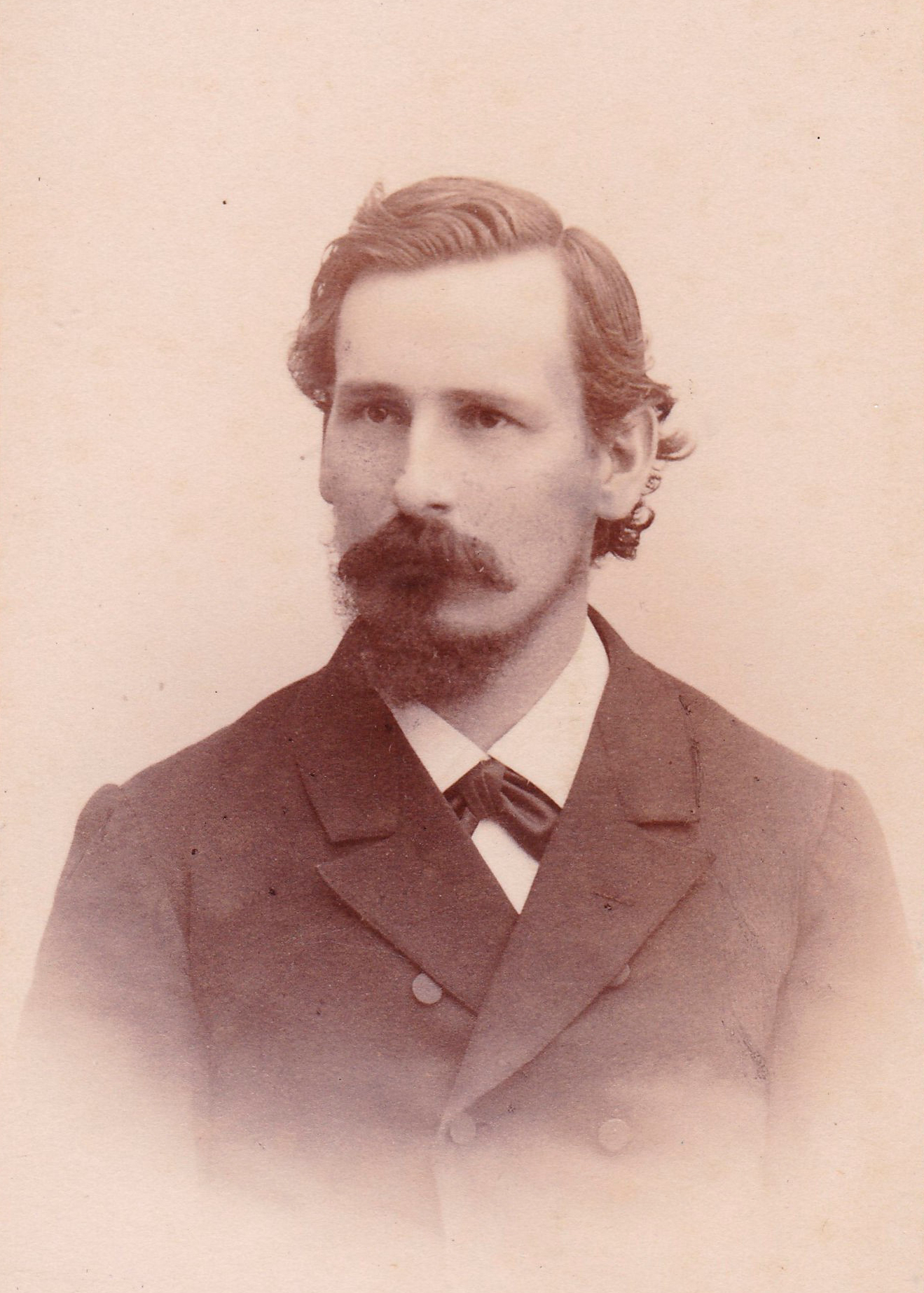
- Ludwig Zehnder c. 1892
- Born: May 4, 1854; Illnau, Switzerland
- Died: March 24, 1949 (aged 94); Oberhofen am Thunersee, Switzerland
- Known for: Mach–Zehnder interferometer

Ludwig Louis Albert Zehnder (4 May 1854, in Illnau – 24 March 1949, in Oberhofen am Thunersee) was a Swiss physicist, one of the inventors of the Mach–Zehnder interferometer.

== Early life ==
Zehnder studied mechanical engineering in Zurich from 1873 to 1875. After that, he ran a factory for electrical equipment in Basel for 15 years. However, this did not satisfy him in the long run and he went to Berlin in 1885 to study physics with Hermann von Helmholtz.

Zehnder was a student of Wilhelm Röntgen, professor of physics at the universities of Freiburg and Basel. He produced the first pictures of the human skeleton in 1896 by shining x-rays through the human body.
