= Bernhard Hirzel =

Swiss theologian and linguist (1807–1847)

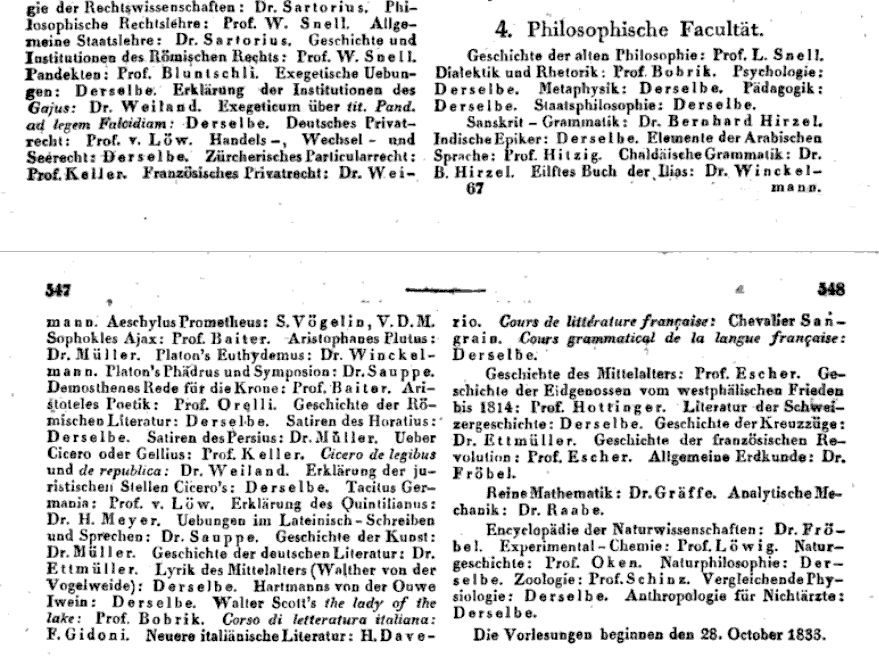
Hirzel is listed as offering courses in Sanskrit grammar, Indian epics and Chaldean grammar in the winter term of 1833/34.

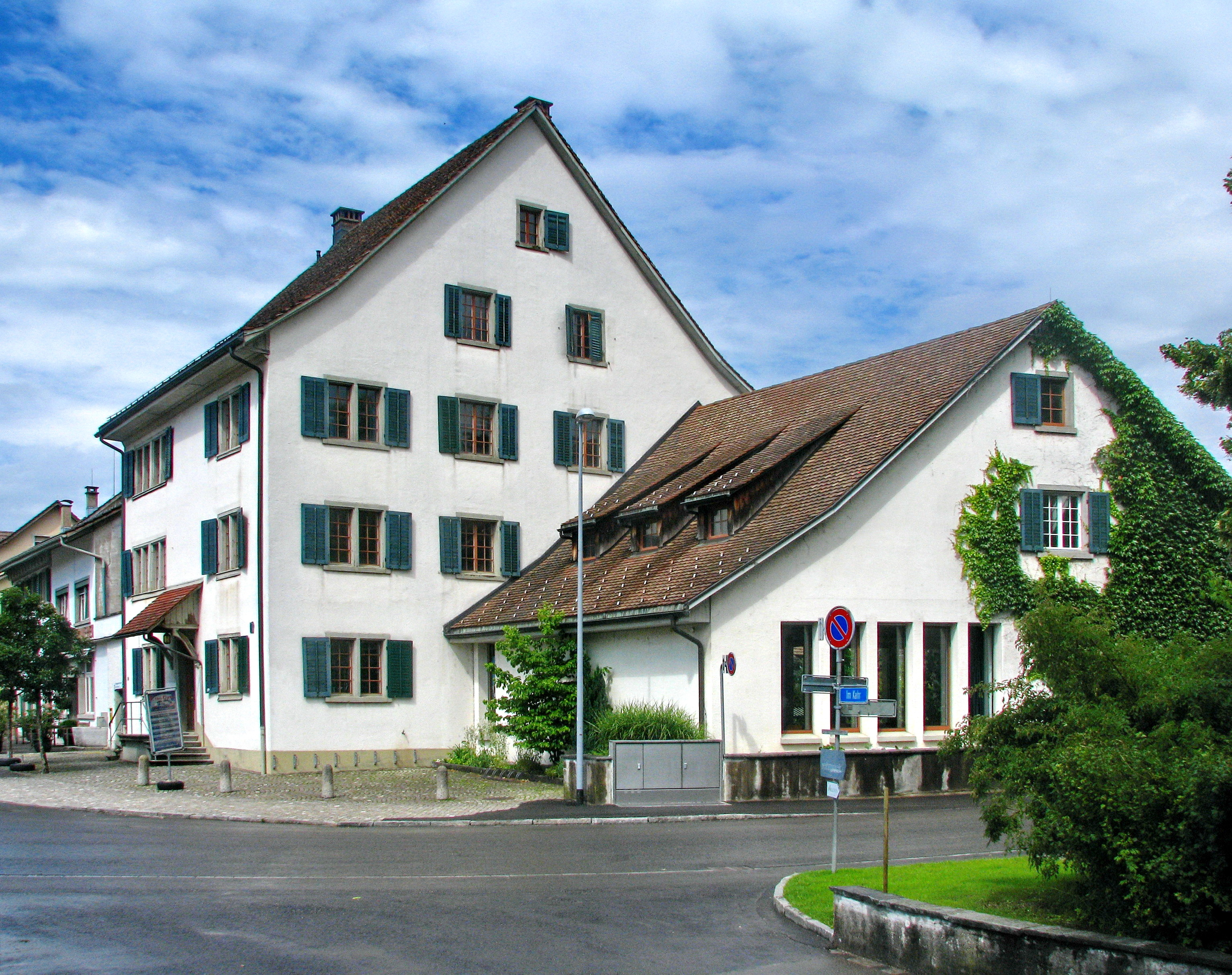
Hirzel's former rectory in Pfäffikon

Bernhard Hirzel (12 August 1807 – 6 June 1847 in Paris) was a Swiss indologist, theologian and Orientalist.

He studied theology in Zürich (1819–31) and philology in Berlin and Paris, promoted 1833 in Göttingen. He married Maria Elisa Tobler in 1833. From 1833 he was reading in Zürich, and was elected professor for oriental languages in 1835. His lectures met with little interest, with only two out of 43 announced. In 1837, he left Zürich for a position as pastor in Pfäffikon.

The election of David Strauss, a free-thinking theologian and pioneer in the historical investigation of Jesus, to the University of Zürich caused a tumult among the rural population, resulting in Hirzel leading a troop of insurgents to Zürich, which succeeded to force the city council to surrender. In 1845, Hirzel quit his post in Pfäffikon and again became reader at Zürich University, but was soon forced to flee because of his involvement in a case of financial fraud. He went into exile in Paris, where he committed suicide by taking poison in 1847.

== Translations from the Sanskrit ==
- Sakuntala (Zürich 1833)
- Urwasi (Frauenfeld 1838)
- Meghaduta oder der Wolkenbote (Frauenfeld 1846)
