= Bauma =

- Municipality
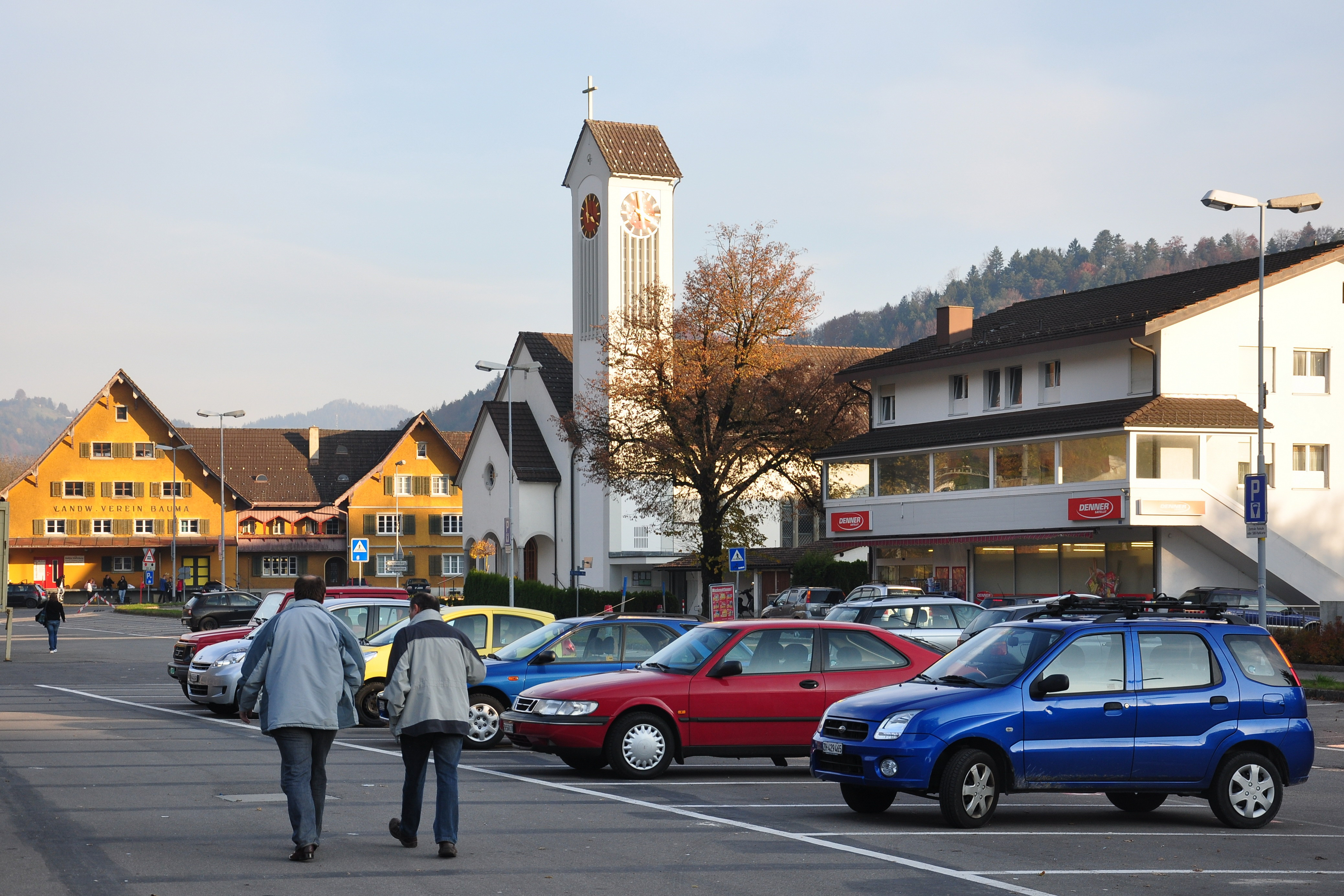

- Flag Coat of arms
- Location of Bauma
- Location within Switzerland Location within Canton of Zurich
- Coordinates: 47°22′N 8°52′E
- Country: Switzerland
- Canton: Zurich
- District: Pfäffikon

Government
  - Mayor: Peter Good

Area
  - Total: 20.91 km^{2} (8.07 sq mi)
- Elevation: 640 m (2,100 ft)

Population (Dec 2013)
  - Total: 4,307
  - Density: 206.0/km^{2} (533.5/sq mi)
- Time zone: UTC+01:00 (CET)
  - Summer (DST): UTC+02:00 (CEST)
- Postal code: 8484
- SFOS number: 297
- ISO 3166 code: CH-ZH
- Localities: Saland, Dillhaus, Dürstelen, Neuthal, Wolfensberg, Wellenau, Lipperschwändi, Schindlet
- Surrounded by: Fischenthal, Sternenberg, Wila, Wildberg, Pfäffikon, Hittnau, Bäretswil
- Website: www.bauma-zh.ch

Bauma (German pronunciation: [ˈbaʊma]) is a municipality in the district of Pfäffikon in the canton of Zurich in Switzerland.

== History ==
Bauma is first mentioned in 1470 as Boumen. Bauma and Sternenberg merged to Bauma on 1 January 2015.

== Geography ==
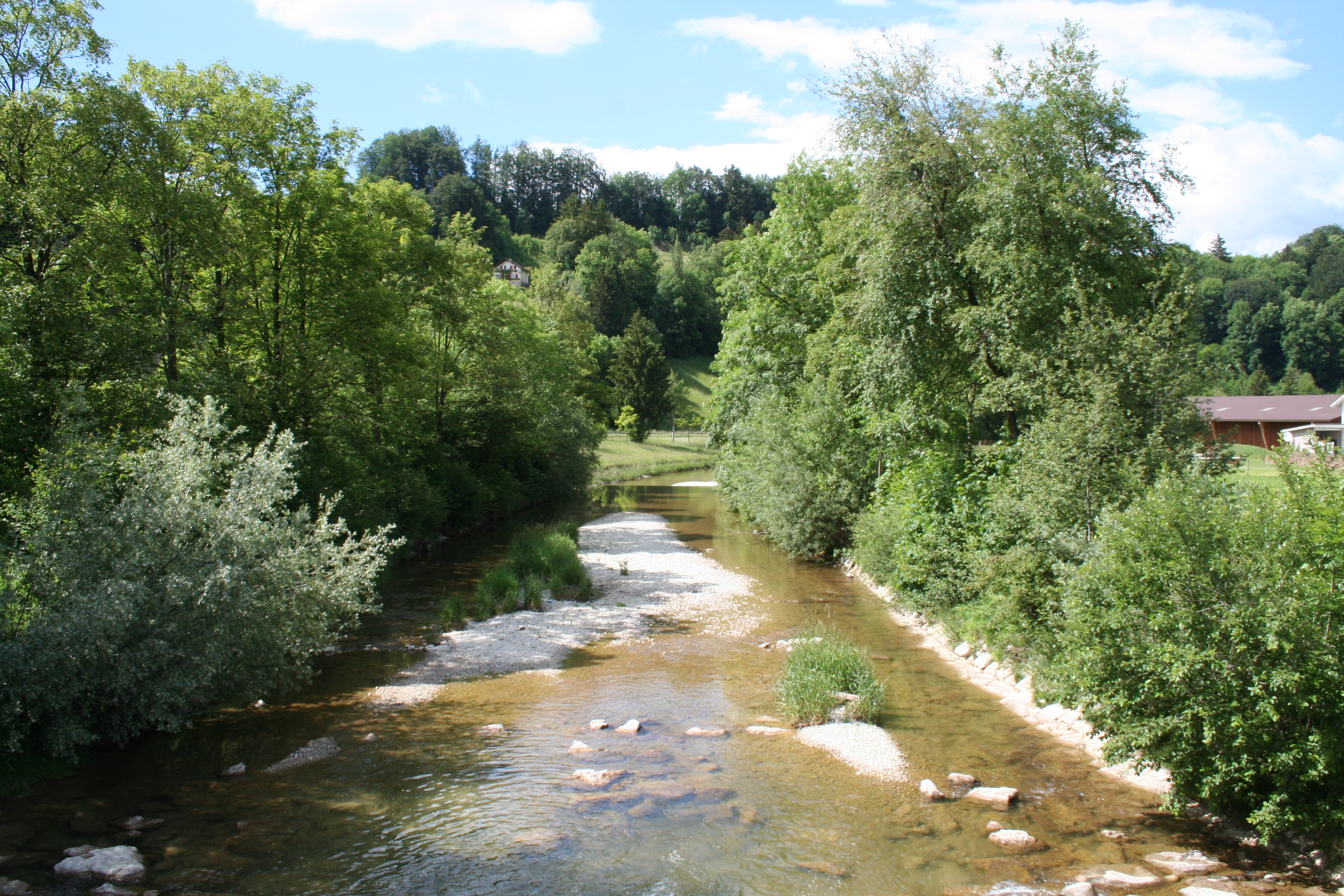
River Töss in Bauma

Aerial view from 300 m by Walter Mittelholzer (1927)

Following the 2015 merger, Bauma had a total area of 29.53 km^{2} (11.40 sq mi). Before the merger Bauma had an area of 20.8 km^{2} (8.0 sq mi). Of this area, 35.8% is used for agricultural purposes, while 54.4% is forested. Of the rest of the land, 8.6% is settled (buildings or roads) and the remainder (1.2%) is non-productive (rivers, glaciers or mountains). In 1996 housing and buildings made up 6% of the total area, while transportation infrastructure made up the rest (2.7%). Of the total unproductive area, water (streams and lakes) made up 1.1% of the area. As of 2007 6.9% of the total municipal area was undergoing some type of construction.

Bauma is situated in the upper Töss Valley at the foot of the Hörnli ridge. It consists of two sections Bauma and Saland and about 80 hamlets and individual houses scattered throughout the valley and hillside. The localities within the municipality besides the villages of Bauma and Saland include the formerly independent village of Hörnen (first mentioned in 869 as Huornomarcha), Altlandenberg, Juckern, Blitterswil, Dillhaus, Undalen, Blitterswil, Bliggenswil, Wolfensberg, Wellenau, Lipperschwendi, Laubberg and Schindlet.

== Demographics ==
The municipality after the 2015 merger, had a population (based on 31 December 2020 numbers) of 4,881. As of 2007, 14.0% of the population was made up of foreign nationals. As of 2008 the gender distribution of the population was 49.3% male and 50.7% female. Over the last 10 years the population has decreased at a rate of -2.9%. Most of the population (as of 2000) speaks German (92.0%), with Italian being second most common (1.8%) and Albanian being third (1.8%).

In the 2007 election the most popular party was the SVP which received 45.8% of the vote. The next three most popular parties were the CSP (13.6%), the SPS (10.7%) and the Green Party (8.5%).

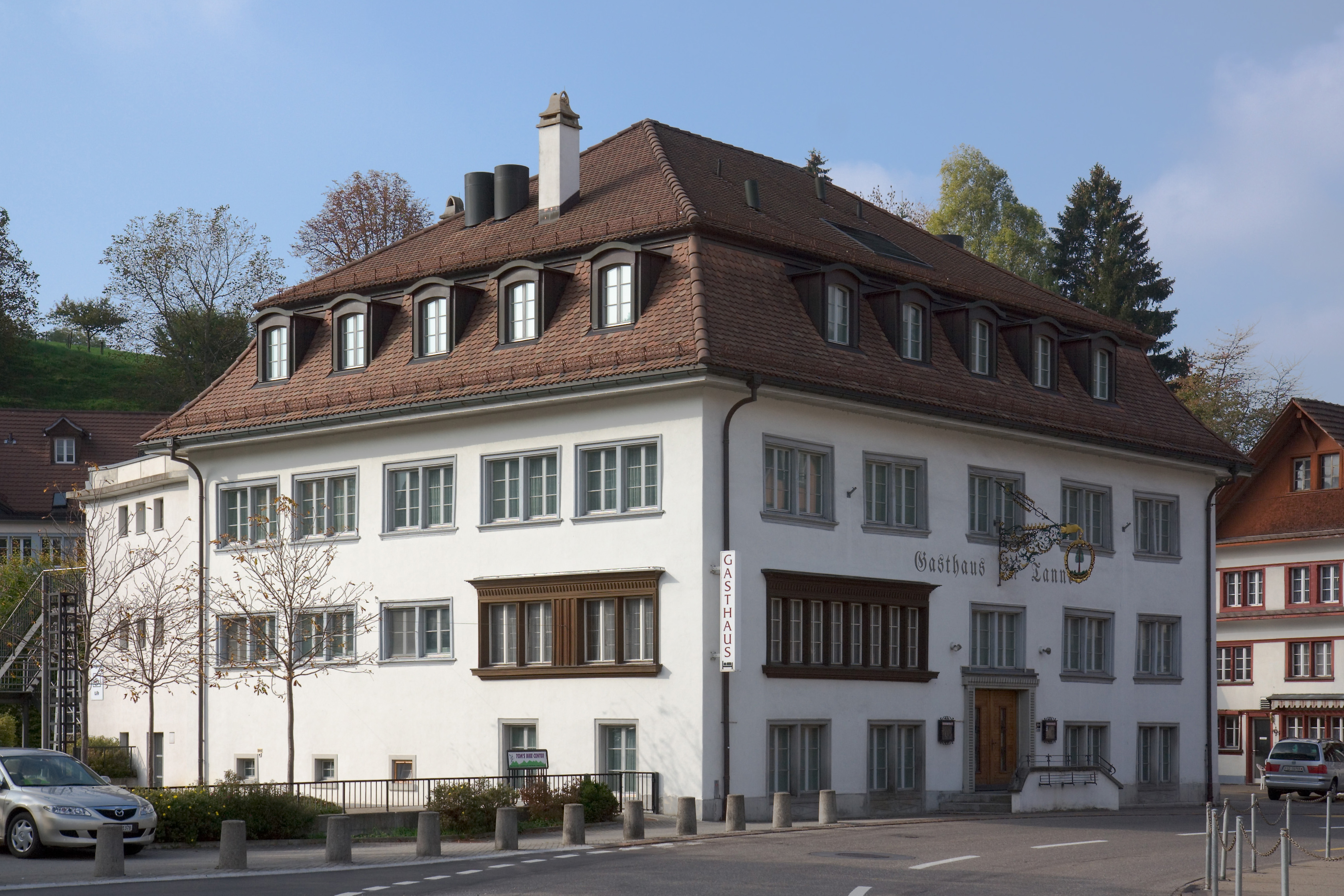
Gasthaus Tanne in Bauma

The age distribution of the population (as of 2000) is children and teenagers (0–19 years old) make up 28.5% of the population, while adults (20–64 years old) make up 58.7% and seniors (over 64 years old) make up 12.8%. The entire Swiss population is generally well educated. In Bauma about 73.5% of the population (between age 25-64) have completed either non-mandatory upper secondary education or additional higher education (either university or a Fachhochschule). There are 1618 households in Bauma.

Bauma has an unemployment rate of 1.79%. As of 2005, there were 151 people employed in the primary economic sector and about 56 businesses involved in this sector. 541 people are employed in the secondary sector and there are 65 businesses in this sector. 833 people are employed in the tertiary sector, with 138 businesses in this sector. As of 2007 35.4% of the working population were employed full-time, and 64.6% were employed part-time.

As of 2008 there were 864 Catholics and 2224 Protestants in Bauma. In the 2000 census, religion was broken down into several smaller categories. From the census, 59% were some type of Protestant, with 54.8% belonging to the Swiss Reformed Church and 4.2% belonging to other Protestant churches. 22% of the population were Catholic. Of the rest of the population, 0% were Muslim, 5.7% belonged to another religion (not listed), 3.9% did not give a religion, and 9% were atheist or agnostic.

== Historic population ==
The historical population is given in the following chart:

== Weather ==
Between 1981 and 2010 Bauma has an average of 151 days of rain per year and on average receives 1,590.4 mm (62.61 in) of precipitation. The wettest month is June during which time Bauma receives an average of 174.5 mm (6.87 in) of precipitation over an average of 13.8 days. The driest month is February with 94.3 mm (3.71 in) of precipitation over an average of 11.4 days The month with the least days of precipitation is October, with an average of 10.7 but with 114.5 mm (4.51 in) of precipitation.

== Transportation ==
Bauma railway station and Saland railway station are both situated within the municipality of Bauma. Both are stops on the Zurich S-Bahn service S26.
