= Illnau-Effretikon =

- Municipality
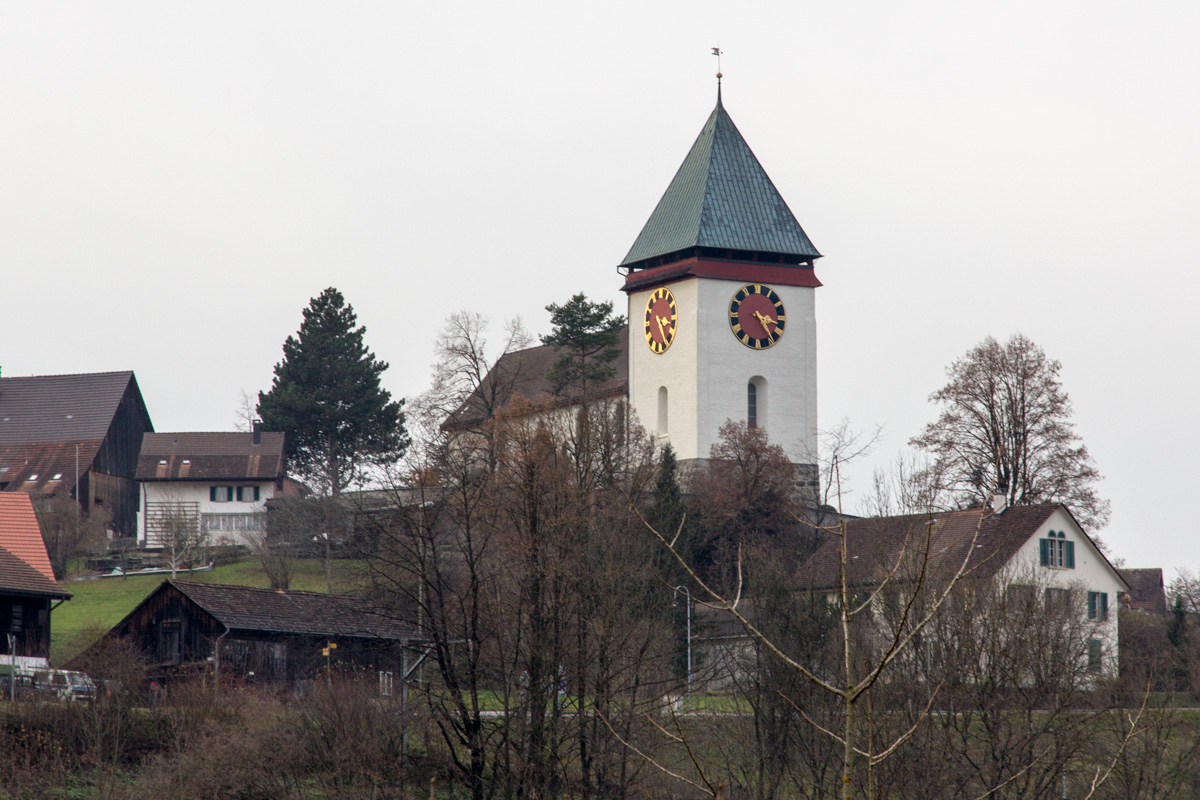
- Flag Coat of arms
- Location of Illnau-Effretikon
- Location within Switzerland Location within Canton of Zurich
- Coordinates: 47°26′N 8°42′E
- Country: Switzerland
- Canton: Zurich
- District: Pfäffikon

Government
  - Executive: Stadtrat with 9 members
  - Mayor: Stadtpräsident; Ueli Müller (as of March 2014)
  - Parliament: Grosser Gemeinderat with 36 members

Area
  - Total: 25.28 km^{2} (9.76 sq mi)
- Elevation: 516 m (1,693 ft)

Population (December 2020)
  - Total: 16,298
  - Density: 644.7/km^{2} (1,670/sq mi)
- Time zone: UTC+01:00 (CET)
  - Summer (DST): UTC+02:00 (CEST)
- Postal codes: 8307 Effretikon; 8308 Illnau
- SFOS number: 296
- ISO 3166 code: CH-ZH
- Localities: Illnau, Effretikon, Ottikon bei Kemptthal, Bisikon, Agasul, Bietenholz, Billikon, First, Horben, Kemleten, Luckhausen, Mesikon, Oberkempttal
- Surrounded by: Fehraltorf, Kyburg, Lindau, Russikon, Volketswil, Weisslingen, Winterthur
- Twin towns: Orlová (Czech Republic), Grossbottwar (Germany), Calanca, Mont-sur-Rolle
- Website: www.ilef.ch

Illnau-Effretikon is a municipality in the district of Pfäffikon in the canton of Zürich in Switzerland. It includes the villages of Illnau, Effretikon, Ottikon and Bisikon. On 1 January 2016 Kyburg and Illnau-Effretikon merged to form the municipality of Illnau-Effretikon.

== History ==
Aerial view by Walter Mittelholzer (1932)

Illnau-Effretikon is first mentioned in 745 as Illenavvia and Erpfratinchova. At first the name of the municipality was Illnau as that town used to be the political and economic center of the municipality. However, when the railway connection was built from Zurich to Winterthur in 1855, only the much smaller Effretikon was in a position to receive a railway station. Subsequently, the economic boom caused by the railway made Effretikon grow disproportionately until it had outgrown Illnau by the beginning of the 20th century. The name of the municipality was finally changed to Illnau-Effretikon in 1973. On 1 January 2016 the former municipality of Kyburg and Illnau-Effretikon merged to form the municipality of Illnau-Effretikon.

== Geography ==
Before the 2016 merger, Illnau-Effretikon had an area of 25.3 km^{2} (9.8 sq mi). Of this area, 52.1% is used for agricultural purposes, while 29.4% is forested. Of the rest of the land, 17.2% is settled (buildings or roads) and the remainder (1.3%) is non-productive (rivers, glaciers or mountains). In 1996 housing and buildings made up 10.8% of the total area, while transportation infrastructure made up the rest (6.4%). Of the total unproductive area, water (streams and lakes) made up 0.4% of the area. As of 2007 12.5% of the total municipal area was undergoing some type of construction.

The municipality is located in the mid-Kempt valley. It consists of the villages of Illnau, Effretikon (including Rikon), Ottikon and Bisikon as well as the hamlets of Agasul, Bietenholz, portions of Billikon, First, Horben, Kemleten, Luckhausen, portions of Mesikon and Oberkempttal.

== Demographics ==
Illnau-Effretikon has a population (as of 31 December 2020) of 17,352. As of 2007, 20.9% of the population was made up of foreign nationals. As of 2008 the gender distribution of the population was 49% male and 51% female. Over the last 10 years the population has grown at a rate of 6.4%. Most of the population (as of 2000) speaks German (84.9%), with Italian being second most common ( 4.3%) and Albanian being third ( 2.1%).

In the 2007 election the most popular party was the SVP which received 38% of the vote. The next two most popular parties were the SPS (17.7%) and the FDP (10.8%).

The age distribution of the population (as of 2000) is children and teenagers (0–19 years old) make up 20.1% of the population, while adults (20–64 years old) make up 66.7% and seniors (over 64 years old) make up 13.2%. The entire Swiss population is generally well educated. In Illnau-Effretikon about 75.6% of the population (between age 25-64) have completed either non-mandatory upper secondary education or additional higher education (either university or a Fachhochschule). There are 6702 households in Illnau-Effretikon.

Illnau-Effretikon has an unemployment rate of 3.24%. As of 2005, there were 293 people employed in the primary economic sector and about 73 businesses involved in this sector. 1610 people are employed in the secondary sector and there are 156 businesses in this sector. 3148 people are employed in the tertiary sector, with 488 businesses in this sector. As of 2007 50% of the working population were employed full-time, and 50% were employed part-time.

As of 2008 there were 4085 Catholics and 6167 Protestants in Illnau-Effretikon. In the 2000 census, religion was broken down into several smaller categories. From the census, 48.4% were some type of Protestant, with 45.1% belonging to the Swiss Reformed Church and 3.3% belonging to other Protestant churches. 28.4% of the population were Catholic. Of the rest of the population, 5.8% were Muslim, 8.4% belonged to another religion (not listed), 2.8% did not give a religion, and 11.2% were atheist or agnostic.

The historical population is given in the following table:

year	population
1634	878
1799	2,525
1850	2,845
1900	2,767
1950	4,357
1970	13,693
1990	14,566
2000	14,491

== Transportation ==
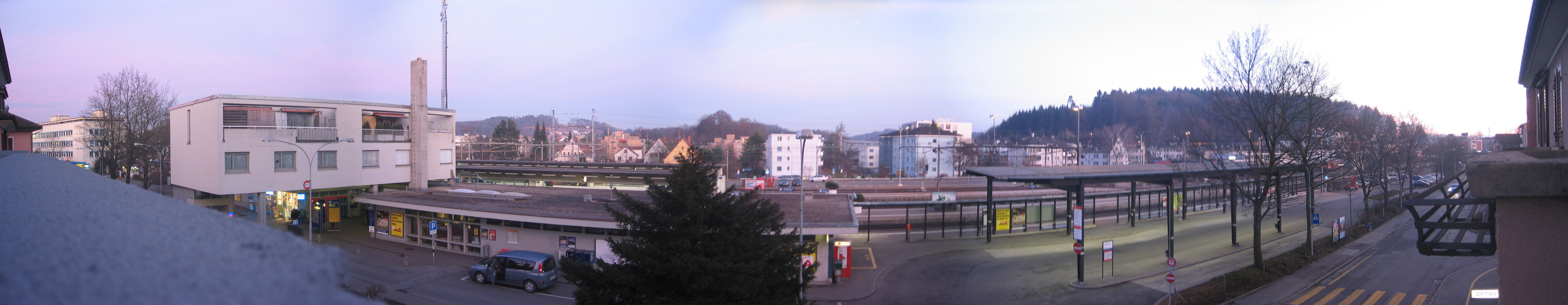
Effretikon Mainstation

The municipality of Illnau-Effretikon is served by two railway stations. Effretikon railway station is on the Zurich to Winterthur main line and is served by Zürich S-Bahn routes S2, S3, S7, S8, S19 and S24. Illnau railway station is on the Effretikon to Hinwil line and is served by S3 and S19.

== Notable people ==
- Ludwig Zehnder (1854 in Illnau – 1949) a Swiss physicist, the inventor of an interferometer
- Walter Roderer (1920–2012 in Illnau) a Swiss actor and screenwriter
- Fabian Molina (born 1990) a Swiss politician, member of the National Council, brought up in Illnau-Effretikon
