= Wildberg, Switzerland =

Wildberg
- Municipality
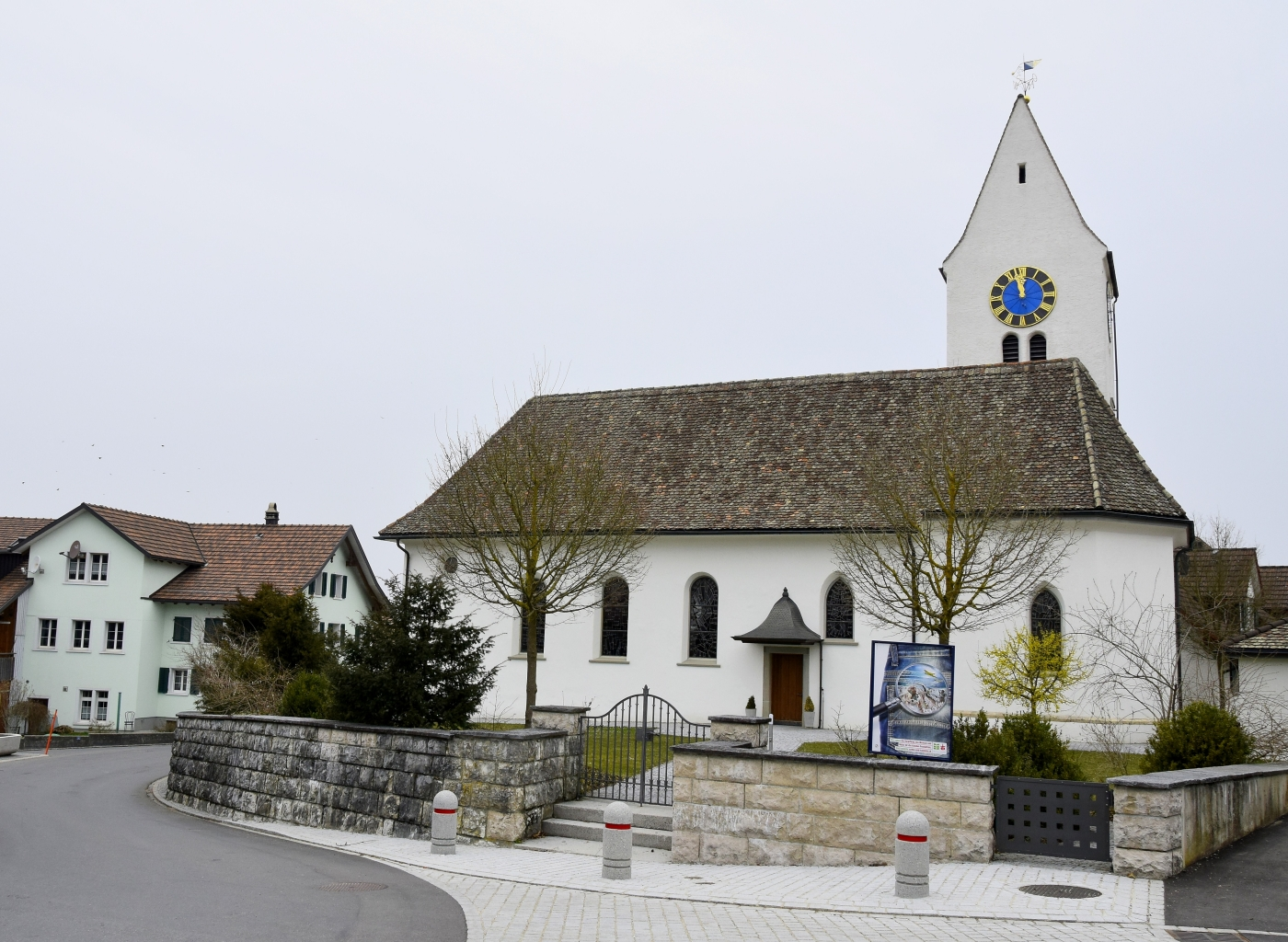

- Flag Coat of arms
- Location of Wildberg
- Location within Switzerland Location within Canton of Zurich
- Coordinates: 47°26′N 8°49′E
- Country: Switzerland
- Canton: Zurich
- District: Pfäffikon

Area
  - Total: 10.83 km^{2} (4.18 sq mi)
- Elevation: 650 m (2,130 ft)

Population (December 2020)
  - Total: 1,009
  - Density: 93.17/km^{2} (241.3/sq mi)
- Time zone: UTC+01:00 (CET)
  - Summer (DST): UTC+02:00 (CEST)
- Postal code: 8489
- SFOS number: 182
- ISO 3166 code: CH-ZH
- Surrounded by: Bauma, Pfäffikon, Russikon, Turbenthal, Weisslingen, Wila, Zell
- Website: www.wildberg.ch

Wildberg (Swiss Standard German pronunciation: [ˈvɪldbɛrɡ]) is a municipality in the district of Pfäffikon in the canton of Zürich in Switzerland.

== Geography ==
Aerial view by Walter Mittelholzer (1919)

Wildberg has an area of 10.6 km^{2} (4.1 sq mi). Of this area, 54.6% is used for agricultural purposes, while 36.9% is forested. Of the rest of the land, 6.7% is settled (buildings or roads) and the remainder (1.7%) is non-productive (rivers, glaciers or mountains). In 1996 housing and buildings made up 4.5% of the total area, while transportation infrastructure made up the rest (1.8%). Of the total unproductive area, water (streams and lakes) made up 0.4% of the area. As of 2007 3% of the total municipal area was undergoing some type of construction.

== Demographics ==
Wildberg has a population (as of 31 December 2020) of 1,009. As of 2007, 7.3% of the population was made up of foreign nationals. As of 2008 the gender distribution of the population was 50.4% male and 49.6% female. Over the last 10 years the population has decreased at a rate of -2.7%. Most of the population (as of 2000) speaks German (97.1%), with French being second most common ( 0.6%) and Dutch being third ( 0.6%).

In the 2007 election the most popular party was the SVP which received 54.8% of the vote. The next three most popular parties were the CSP (13.1%), the SPS (10.3%) and the Green Party (7.4%).

The age distribution of the population (as of 2000) is children and teenagers (0–19 years old) make up 26.4% of the population, while adults (20–64 years old) make up 62.5% and seniors (over 64 years old) make up 11.1%. In Wildberg about 86.4% of the population (between age 25–64) have completed either non-mandatory upper secondary education or additional higher education (either university or a Fachhochschule). There are 332 households in Wildberg.

Wildberg has an unemployment rate of 1.46%. As of 2005, there were 91 people employed in the primary economic sector and about 34 businesses involved in this sector. 40 people are employed in the secondary sector and there are 12 businesses in this sector. 79 people are employed in the tertiary sector, with 25 businesses in this sector. As of 2007 46.2% of the working population were employed full-time, and 53.8% were employed part-time.

As of 2008 there were 134 Catholics and 633 Protestants in Wildberg. In the 2000 census, religion was broken down into several smaller categories. From the census, 72.5% were some type of Protestant, with 70.4% belonging to the Swiss Reformed Church and 2% belonging to other Protestant churches. 13.7% of the population were Catholic. Of the rest of the population, 0% were Muslim, 1.1% belonged to another religion (not listed), 0.2% did not give a religion, and 12.5% were atheist or agnostic.
