= Fehraltorf =

- Municipality
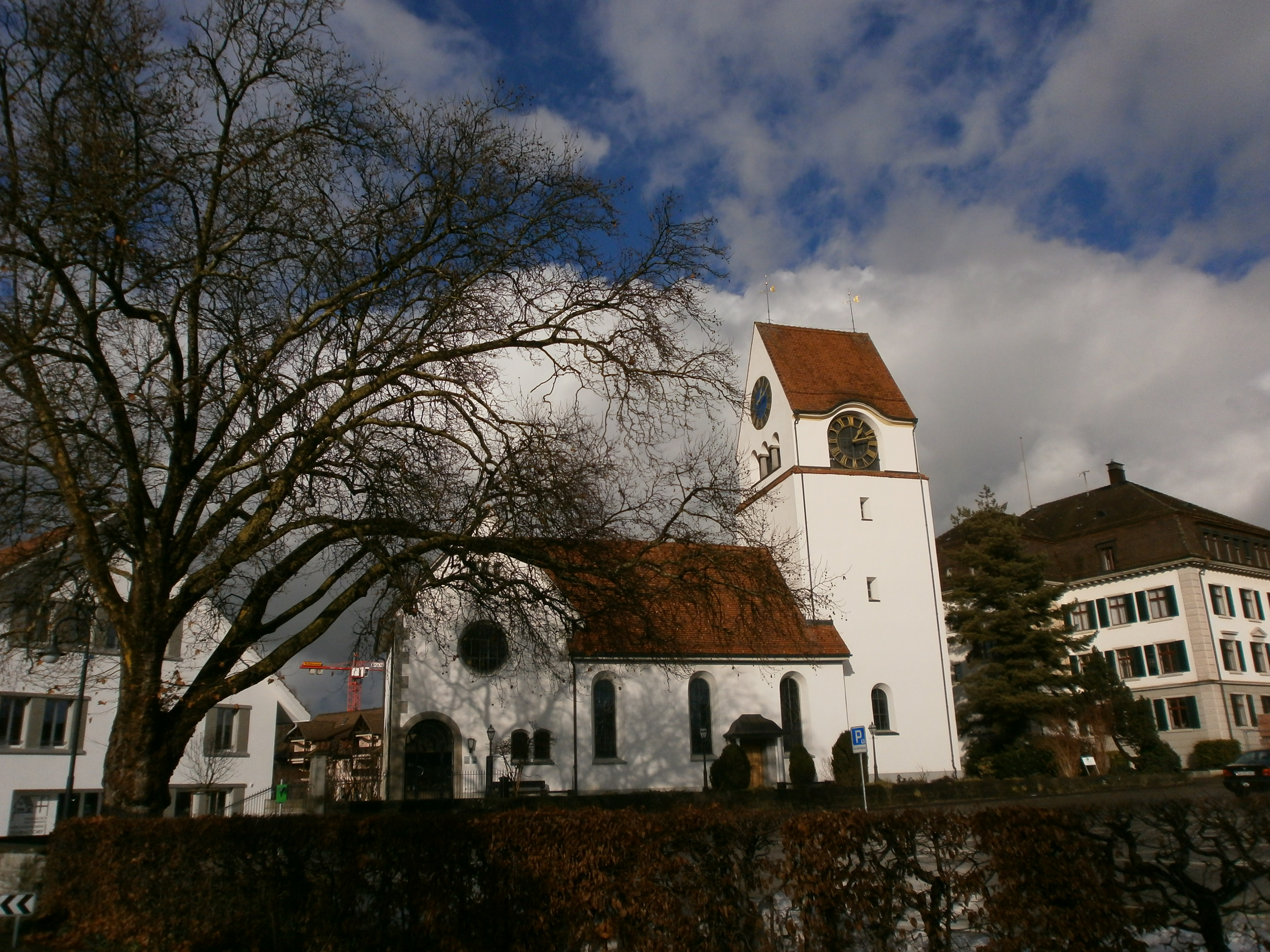

- Flag Coat of arms
- Location of Fehraltorf
- Location within Switzerland Location within Canton of Zurich
- Coordinates: 47°23′N 8°45′E
- Country: Switzerland
- Canton: Zurich
- District: Pfäffikon

Area
  - Total: 9.54 km^{2} (3.68 sq mi)
- Elevation: 530 m (1,740 ft)

Population (December 2020)
  - Total: 6,574
  - Density: 689/km^{2} (1,780/sq mi)
- Time zone: UTC+01:00 (CET)
  - Summer (DST): UTC+02:00 (CEST)
- Postal code: 8320
- SFOS number: 172
- ISO 3166 code: CH-ZH
- Surrounded by: Illnau-Effretikon, Pfäffikon, Russikon, Uster, Volketswil
- Website: www.fehraltorf.ch

Fehraltorf is a municipality in the district of Pfäffikon in the canton of Zürich in Switzerland.

== History ==
Fehraltorf is first mentioned between 1265-87 as Rueggesaltorf and also as Altorf de Chiburg. Around 1670 it was mentioned as Rüeggis-Altdorff and as Feer-Altdorff.

== Geography ==
Aerial view by Walter Mittelholzer (1920)

Fehraltorf has an area of 9.5 km^{2} (3.7 sq mi). Of this area, 55.8% is used for agricultural purposes, while 27.3% is forested. Of the rest of the land, 15.9% is settled (buildings or roads) and the remainder (1.1%) is non-productive (rivers, glaciers or mountains). In 1996 housing and buildings made up 10.3% of the total area, while transportation infrastructure made up the rest (5.6%). Of the total unproductive area, water (streams and lakes) made up 0.7% of the area. As of 2007 13.6% of the total municipal area was undergoing some type of construction.

It is located in the upper Kempt valley and includes the village of Fehraltorf and a portion of the hamlet of Mesikon.

== Demographics ==
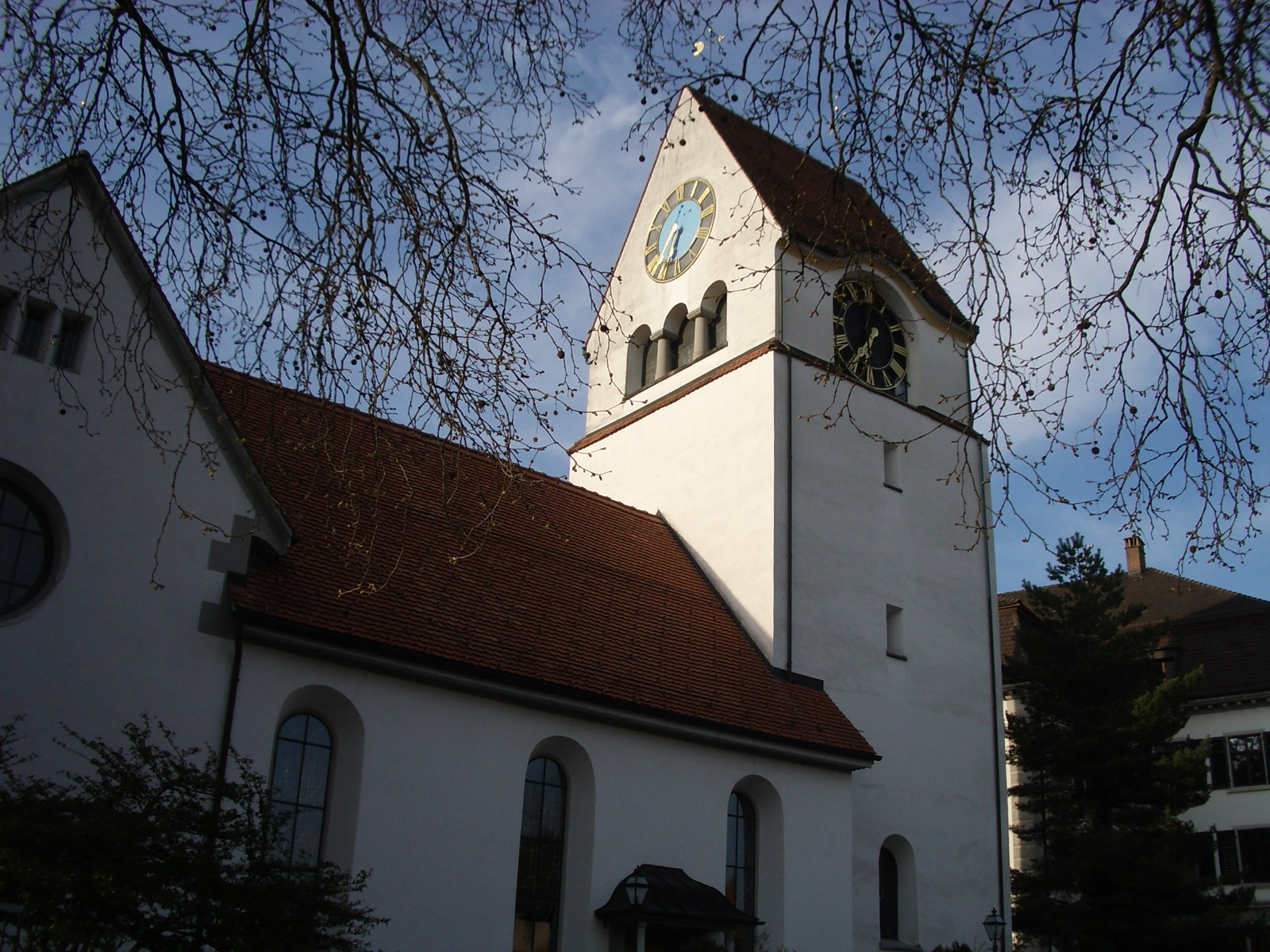
Fehraltorf Church

Fehraltorf has a population (as of 31 December 2020) of 6,574. As of 2007, 15.2% of the population was made up of foreign nationals. As of 2008 the gender distribution of the population was 49.6% male and 50.4% female. Over the last 10 years the population has grown at a rate of 15.1%. Most of the population (as of 2000) speaks German (88.6%), with Italian being second most common ( 2.6%) and Albanian being third ( 1.9%).

In the 2007 election the most popular party was the SVP which received 39.6% of the vote. The next three most popular parties were the SPS (15.2%), the FDP (14.2%) and the CSP (10.2%).

The age distribution of the population (as of 2000) is children and teenagers (0–19 years old) make up 26.1% of the population, while adults (20–64 years old) make up 66.3% and seniors (over 64 years old) make up 7.7%. The entire Swiss population is generally well educated. In Fehraltorf about 79.9% of the population (between age 25-64) have completed either non-mandatory upper secondary education or additional higher education (either university or a Fachhochschule). There are 1916 households in Fehraltorf.

Fehraltorf has an unemployment rate of 2.58%. As of 2005, there were 153 people employed in the primary economic sector and about 31 businesses involved in this sector. 884 people are employed in the secondary sector and there are 78 businesses in this sector. 1472 people are employed in the tertiary sector, with 192 businesses in this sector. As of 2007 71.8% of the working population were employed full-time, and 28.2% were employed part-time.

As of 2008 there were 1433 Catholics and 2414 Protestants in Fehraltorf. In the 2000 census, religion was broken down into several smaller categories. From the census, 50.1% were some type of Protestant, with 47.2% belonging to the Swiss Reformed Church and 2.8% belonging to other Protestant churches. 29.4% of the population were Catholic. Of the rest of the population, 0% were Muslim, 5.2% belonged to another religion (not listed), 2.8% did not give a religion, and 11.8% were atheist or agnostic.

The historical population is given in the following table:

year	population
1467	c. 190
1634	341
1733	800
1850	1,014
1860	1,081
1900	938
1910	910
1950	1,136
1980	2,486
2000	4,687

== Transportation ==
Fehraltorf railway station is a stop of the S-Bahn Zürich on the line S3. The Speck-Fehraltorf Airfield (ICAO Code LSZK) south of town offers a 600m grass runway.
