= Wila, Switzerland =

Wila
- Municipality
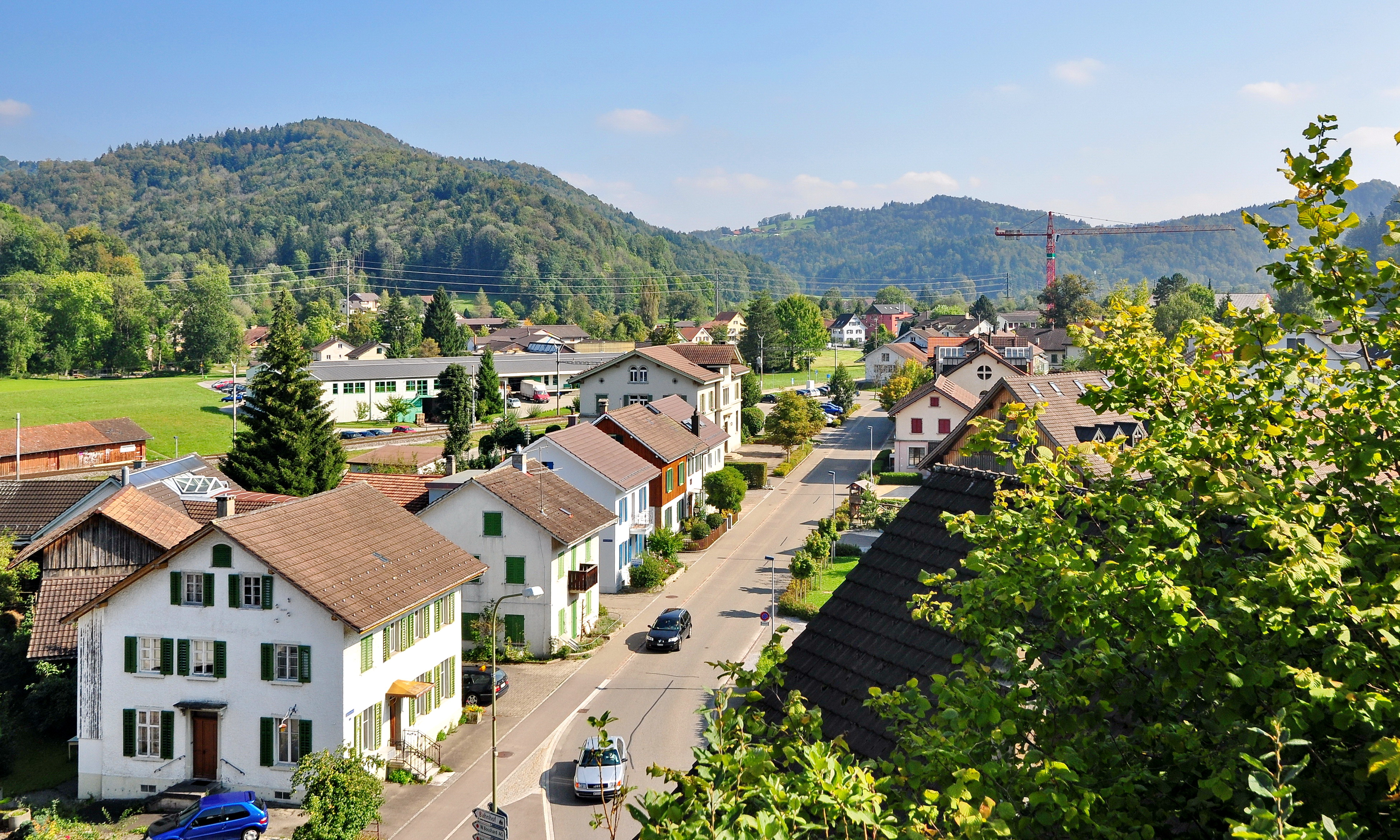

- Flag Coat of arms
- Location of Wila
- Location within Switzerland Location within Canton of Zurich
- Coordinates: 47°25′N 8°51′E
- Country: Switzerland
- Canton: Zurich
- District: Pfäffikon

Area
  - Total: 9.21 km^{2} (3.56 sq mi)
- Elevation: 566 m (1,857 ft)

Population (December 2007)
  - Total: 1,903
  - Density: 207/km^{2} (535/sq mi)
- Time zone: UTC+01:00 (CET)
  - Summer (DST): UTC+02:00 (CEST)
- Postal code: 8492
- SFOS number: 181
- ISO 3166 code: CH-ZH
- Surrounded by: Bauma, Fischingen (TG), Sternenberg, Turbenthal, Wildberg
- Website: www.wila.ch

Wila is a municipality in the district of Pfäffikon in the canton of Zürich in Switzerland.

== Geography ==
Aerial view by Walter Mittelholzer (1920)

Wila has an area of 9.2 km^{2} (3.6 sq mi). Of this area, 38.4% is used for agricultural purposes, while 51.5% is forested. Of the rest of the land, 9.1% is settled (buildings or roads) and the remainder (1.1%) is non-productive (rivers, glaciers or mountains). In 1996 housing and buildings made up 6.4% of the total area, while transportation infrastructure made up the rest (2.9%). Of the total unproductive area, water (streams and lakes) made up 0.9% of the area. As of 2007 8% of the total municipal area was undergoing some type of construction.

Wila is situated in the upper Töss Valley.

== Demographics ==
Wila has a population (as of 2007) of 1,903, of which 9.4% are foreign nationals. As of 2008 the gender distribution of the population was 51% male and 49% female. Over the last 10 years the population has grown at a rate of 7.4%. Most of the population (as of 2000) speaks German (92.4%), with Albanian being second most common ( 1.9%) and Italian being third ( 1.1%).

In the 2007 election the most popular party was the SVP which received 51.3% of the vote. The next three most popular parties were the SPS (14%), the CSP (11.5%) and the Green Party (7.7%).

The age distribution of the population (as of 2000) is children and teenagers (0–19 years old) make up 28.8% of the population, while adults (20–64 years old) make up 59% and seniors (over 64 years old) make up 12.3%. In Wila about 76.6% of the population (between age 25–64) have completed either non-mandatory upper secondary education or additional higher education (either university or a Fachhochschule). There are 726 households in Wila.

Wila has an unemployment rate of 1.52%. As of 2005, there were 75 people employed in the primary economic sector and about 26 businesses involved in this sector. 243 people are employed in the secondary sector and there are 37 businesses in this sector. 226 people are employed in the tertiary sector, with 54 businesses in this sector. As of 2007 46.7% of the working population were employed full-time, and 53.3% were employed part-time.

As of 2008 there were 331 Catholics and 1074 Protestants in Wila. In the 2000 census, religion was broken down into several smaller categories. From the census, 63.3% were some type of Protestant, with 60.1% belonging to the Swiss Reformed Church and 3.2% belonging to other Protestant churches. 18.9% of the population were Catholic. Of the rest of the population, 0% were Muslim, 4.1% belonged to another religion (not listed), 3.2% did not give a religion, and 10.2% were atheist or agnostic.

== Transportation ==
Wila railway station is a stop of the S-Bahn Zürich on the line S26.
