= Sternenberg =

- Former municipality
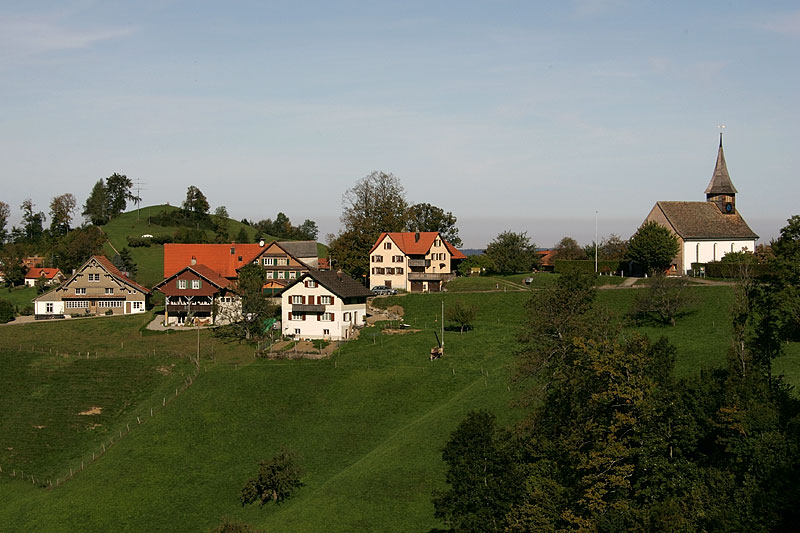

- Flag Coat of arms
- Location of Sternenberg
- Location within Switzerland Location within Canton of Zurich
- Coordinates: 47°23′N 8°55′E
- Country: Switzerland
- Canton: Zurich
- District: Pfäffikon

Area
  - Total: 8.75 km^{2} (3.38 sq mi)
- Elevation: 870 m (2,850 ft)

Population (Dec 2013)
  - Total: 351
  - Density: 40.1/km^{2} (104/sq mi)
- Time zone: UTC+01:00 (CET)
  - Summer (DST): UTC+02:00 (CEST)
- Postal code: 8499
- SFOS number: 179
- ISO 3166 code: CH-ZH
- Surrounded by: Bauma, Fischingen (TG), Fischenthal, Mosnang (SG), Wila
- Website: www.sternenberg.ch

Sternenberg is a former municipality in the district of Pfäffikon in the canton of Zürich in Switzerland. Bauma and Sternenberg merged to Bauma on 1 January 2015.

== Geography ==
Aerial view (1953)

Before the merger, Sternenberg had a total area of 8.7 km^{2} (3.4 mi^{2}). Of this area, 37.9% is used for agricultural purposes, while 58% is forested. Of the rest of the land, 3.8% is settled (buildings or roads) and the remainder (0.2%) is non-productive (rivers, glaciers or mountains). In 1996 housing and buildings made up 2.3% of the total area, while transportation infrastructure made up the rest (1.5%). Of the total unproductive area, water (streams and lakes) made up 0% of the area. As of 2007 0.9% of the total municipal area was undergoing some type of construction.

== Demographics ==
Sternenberg had a population (as of 2013) of 351. As of 2007, 4.0% of the population was made up of foreign nationals. As of 2008 the gender distribution of the population was 51.3% male and 48.7% female. Over the last 10 years the population has decreased at a rate of -1.4%. Most of the population (as of 2000) speaks German (98.0%), with French being second most common ( 0.3%) and English being third ( 0.3%).

In the 2007 election the most popular party was the SVP which received 43.4% of the vote. The next three most popular parties were the SPS (22.5%), the CSP (15.7%) and the Green Party (10.2%).

The age distribution of the population (as of 2000) is children and teenagers (0–19 years old) make up 24.6% of the population, while adults (20–64 years old) make up 58.2% and seniors (over 64 years old) make up 17.2%. In Sternenberg about 76.5% of the population (between age 25-64) have completed either non-mandatory upper secondary education or additional higher education (either university or a Fachhochschule). There are 140 households in Sternenberg.

Sternenberg has an unemployment rate of 1.8%. As of 2005, there were 48 people employed in the primary economic sector and about 22 businesses involved in this sector. 33 people are employed in the secondary sector and there are 9 businesses in this sector. 46 people are employed in the tertiary sector, with 11 businesses in this sector. As of 2007 41% of the working population were employed full-time, and 59% were employed part-time.

As of 2008 there were 59 Catholics and 206 Protestants in Sternenberg. In the 2000 census, religion was broken down into several smaller categories. From the census, 65.6% were some type of Protestant, with 62.2% belonging to the Swiss Reformed Church and 3.4% belonging to other Protestant churches. 13.5% of the population were Catholic. Of the rest of the population, 0% were Muslim, 2% belonged to another religion (not listed), 2.6% did not give a religion, and 16% were atheist or agnostic.
