= Weisslingen =

- Municipality
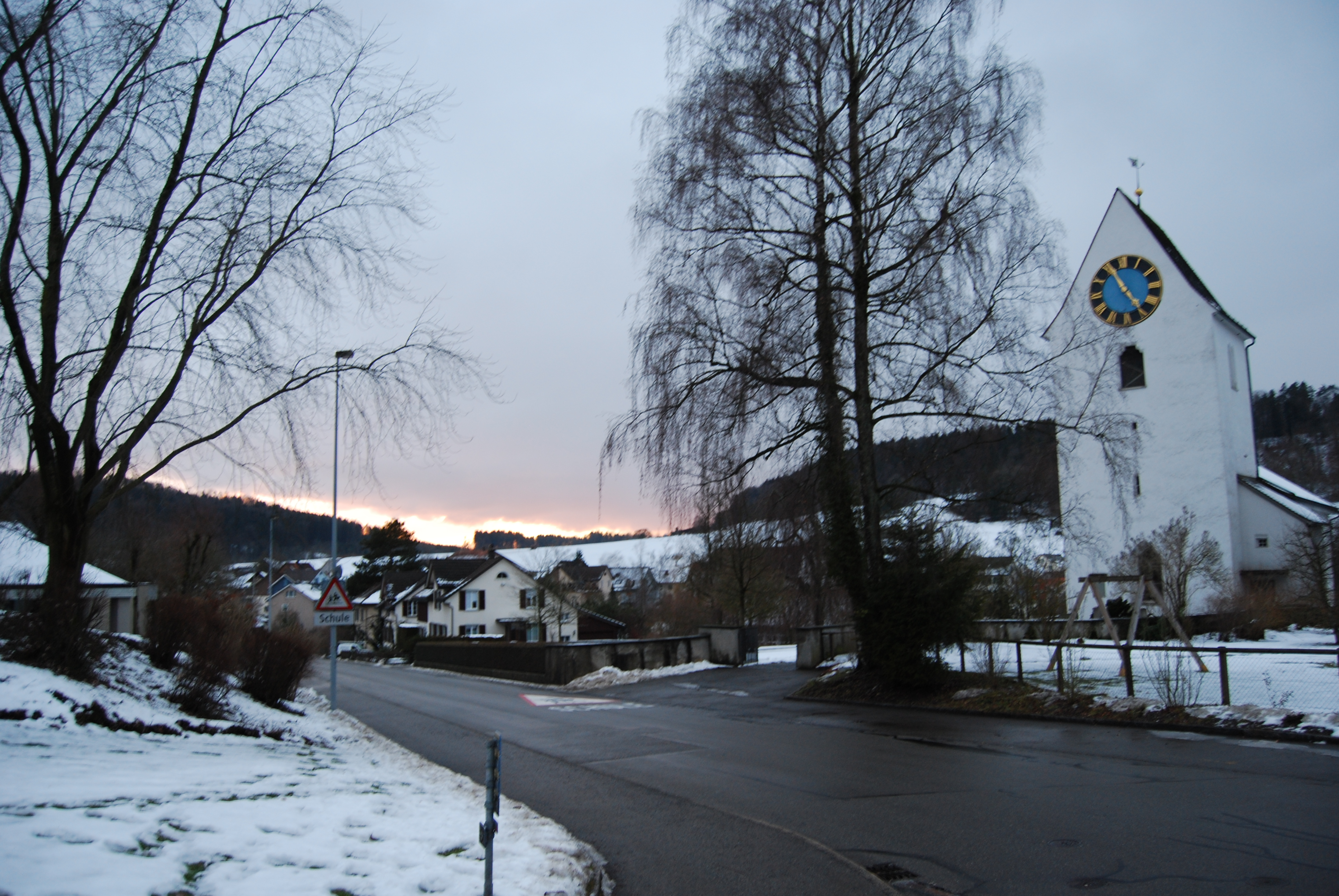

- Flag Coat of arms
- Location of Weisslingen
- Location within Switzerland Location within Canton of Zurich
- Coordinates: 47°26′N 8°46′E
- Country: Switzerland
- Canton: Zurich
- District: Pfäffikon

Area
  - Total: 12.81 km^{2} (4.95 sq mi)
- Elevation: 576 m (1,890 ft)

Population (December 2020)
  - Total: 3,365
  - Density: 262.7/km^{2} (680.4/sq mi)
- Time zone: UTC+01:00 (CET)
  - Summer (DST): UTC+02:00 (CEST)
- Postal code: 8484
- SFOS number: 180
- ISO 3166 code: CH-ZH
- Surrounded by: Illnau-Effretikon, Kyburg, Russikon, Wildberg, Zell
- Website: www.weisslingen.ch

Weisslingen is a municipality in the district of Pfäffikon in the canton of Zürich in Switzerland.

== Geography ==
Aerial view by Walter Mittelholzer (1920)

Weisslingen has an area of 12.8 km^{2} (4.9 sq mi). Of this area, 45.3% is used for agricultural purposes, while 43.6% is forested. Of the rest of the land, 10.4% is settled (buildings or roads) and the remainder (0.8%) is non-productive (rivers, glaciers or mountains). In 1996 housing and buildings made up 6.6% of the total area, while transportation infrastructure made up the rest (3.7%). Of the total unproductive area, water (streams and lakes) made up 0.4% of the area. As of 2007 7.4% of the total municipal area was undergoing some type of construction.

== Demographics ==
Weisslingen has a population (as of 31 December 2020) of 3,365. As of 2007, 6.7% of the population was made up of foreign nationals. As of 2008 the gender distribution of the population was 50.4% male and 49.6% female. Over the last 10 years the population has grown at a rate of 9.9%. Most of the population (as of 2000) speaks German (95.4%), with Italian being second most common ( 1.1%) and English being third (0.7%).

In the 2007 election the most popular party was the SVP which received 43.7% of the vote. The next three most popular parties were the CSP (12.9%), the SPS (11.9%) and the FDP (10.6%).

The age distribution of the population (as of 2000) is children and teenagers (0–19 years old) make up 27.4% of the population, while adults (20–64 years old) make up 61.6% and seniors (over 64 years old) make up 11%. In Weisslingen about 83.9% of the population (between age 25-64) have completed either non-mandatory upper secondary education or additional higher education (either university or a Fachhochschule). There are 1088 households in Weisslingen.

Weisslingen has an unemployment rate of 1.34%. As of 2005, there were 85 people employed in the primary economic sector and about 34 businesses involved in this sector. 171 people are employed in the secondary sector and there are 33 businesses in this sector. 500 people are employed in the tertiary sector, with 89 businesses in this sector. As of 2007 48.6% of the working population were employed full-time, and 51.4% were employed part-time.

As of 2008 there were 612 Catholics and 1794 Protestants in Weisslingen. In the 2000 census, religion was broken down into several smaller categories. From the census, 63.8% were some type of Protestant, with 60.7% belonging to the Swiss Reformed Church and 3.1% belonging to other Protestant churches. 19.9% of the population were Catholic. Of the rest of the population, 0% were Muslim, 2.4% belonged to another religion (not listed), 2.6% did not give a religion, and 10.9% were atheist or agnostic.
