= Kyburg, Zürich =

Kyburg
- Former municipality
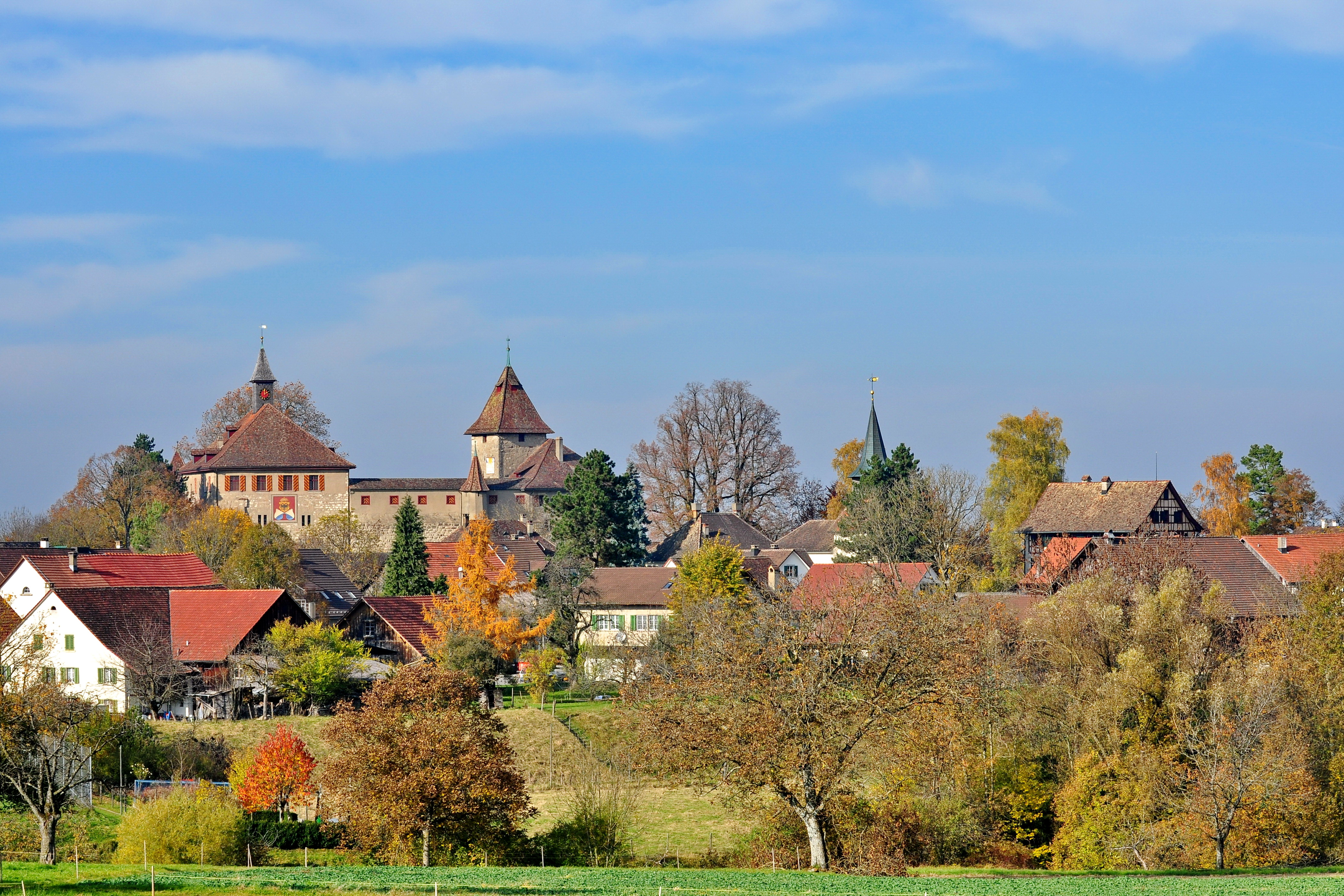

- Flag Coat of arms
- Location of Kyburg
- Location within Switzerland Location within Canton of Zürich
- Coordinates: 47°27′N 8°45′E
- Country: Switzerland
- Canton: Zürich
- District: Pfäffikon

Area
  - Total: 7.58 km^{2} (2.93 sq mi)
- Elevation: 640 m (2,100 ft)

Population (December 2020)
  - Total: 411
  - Density: 54.2/km^{2} (140/sq mi)
- Time zone: UTC+01:00 (CET)
  - Summer (DST): UTC+02:00 (CEST)
- Postal code: 8314
- SFOS number: 175
- ISO 3166 code: CH-ZH
- Surrounded by: Illnau-Effretikon, Weisslingen, Winterthur, Zell
- Website: https://web.archive.org/*/http://www.kyburg.ch

Kyburg is a settlement and former municipality in the district of Pfäffikon in the canton of Zürich in Switzerland, since 2016 part of the municipality of Illnau-Effretikon.

== History ==
Kyburg castle is first mentioned in 1027 as Chuigeburch. A settlement close to the castle is first mentioned in the 1260s. It received its own jurisdiction and exemption from taxation from Albert II, Duke of Austria in 1337. After a fire in 1362, the town was rebuilt with ramparts and was granted a yearly and weekly market by Leopold III, Duke of Austria in 1370. Kyburg was occupied by Schwyz during the Appenzell Wars in 1407. It was partly destroyed in the Old Zürich War and rebuilt without fortification but retaining its market rights and jurisdiction. Kyburg lost all its privileges in 1798 and was incorporated as municipality in Fehraltdorf district. From 1803 to 1815 it was assigned to Uster-Grüningen district, from 1815 to 1831 it was once again administrative seat of a separate Oberamt Kyburg. From 1831 to 2015 it was a municipality in Pfäffikon district. On 1 January 2016 Kyburg was merged with the municipality of Illnau-Effretikon.

== Geography ==
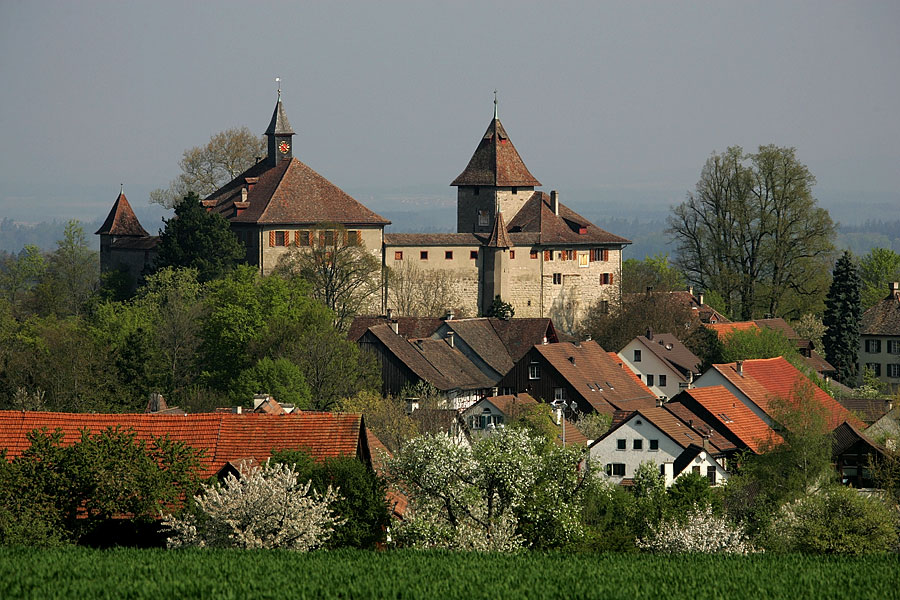
Kyburg and Kyburg castle

Aerial view (1950)

Kyburg has an area of 7.6 km^{2} (2.9 sq mi). Of this area, 31.9% is used for agricultural purposes, while 61% is forested. Of the rest of the land, 5.4% is settled (buildings or roads) and the remainder (1.7%) is non-productive (rivers, glaciers or mountains). In 1996 housing and buildings made up 2.8% of the total area, while transportation infrastructure made up the rest (2.4%). Of the total unproductive area, water (streams and lakes) made up 1.5% of the area. As of 2007 2.4% of the total municipal area was undergoing some type of construction.

The village is built on a Molasse stone outcropping in the Töss Valley. It is overlooked by the Kyburg castle, from which it takes its name. The municipality also includes the hamlets of Ettenhausen, portions of Billikon and Brünggen as well as the Fabriksiedlung or cloth manufacturing settlement of Mühlau an der Töss. It is .

== Demographics ==
Kyburg has a population (as of 31 December 2020) of 411. As of 2007, 7.4% of the population was made up of foreign nationals. As of 2008 the gender distribution of the population was 49.6% male and 50.4% female. Over the last 10 years the population has grown at a rate of 1.5%. Most of the population (as of 2000) speaks German (98.5%), with Serbo-Croatian being second most common (0.5%) and Italian being third (0.3%).

In the 2007 election the most popular party was the SVP which received 47.4% of the vote. The next three most popular parties were the SPS (16.6%), the Green Party (11.7%) and the FDP (9.8%).

The age distribution of the population (as of 2000) is children and teenagers (0–19 years old) make up 26.3% of the population, while adults (20–64 years old) make up 64.4% and seniors (over 64 years old) make up 9.3%. The entire Swiss population is generally well educated. In Kyburg about 88.7% of the population (between age 25-64) have completed either non-mandatory upper secondary education or additional higher education (either university or a Fachhochschule). There are 150 households in Kyburg.

Kyburg has an unemployment rate of 1.23%. As of 2005, there were 25 people employed in the primary economic sector and about 11 businesses involved in this sector. 173 people are employed in the secondary sector and there are 3 businesses in this sector. 58 people are employed in the tertiary sector, with 12 businesses in this sector. As of 2007 47.8% of the working population were employed full-time, and 52.2% were employed part-time.

As of 2008 there were 66 Catholics and 222 Protestants in Kyburg. In the 2000 census, religion was broken down into several smaller categories. From the census, 64.6% were some type of Protestant, with 59.8% belonging to the Swiss Reformed Church and 4.8% belonging to other Protestant churches. 17.7% of the population were Catholic. Of the rest of the population, 0% were Muslim, 0.5% belonged to another religion (not listed), 1.3% did not give a religion, and 15.4% were atheist or agnostic.

The historical population is given in the following table:

year	population
1634	148
1771	296
1850	374
1900	358
1950	386
2000	396

== Transportation ==
Sennhof-Kyburg railway station is a stop of the Zürich S-Bahn service S26.
