= Pfäffikon, Zürich =

Pfäffikon
- Municipality
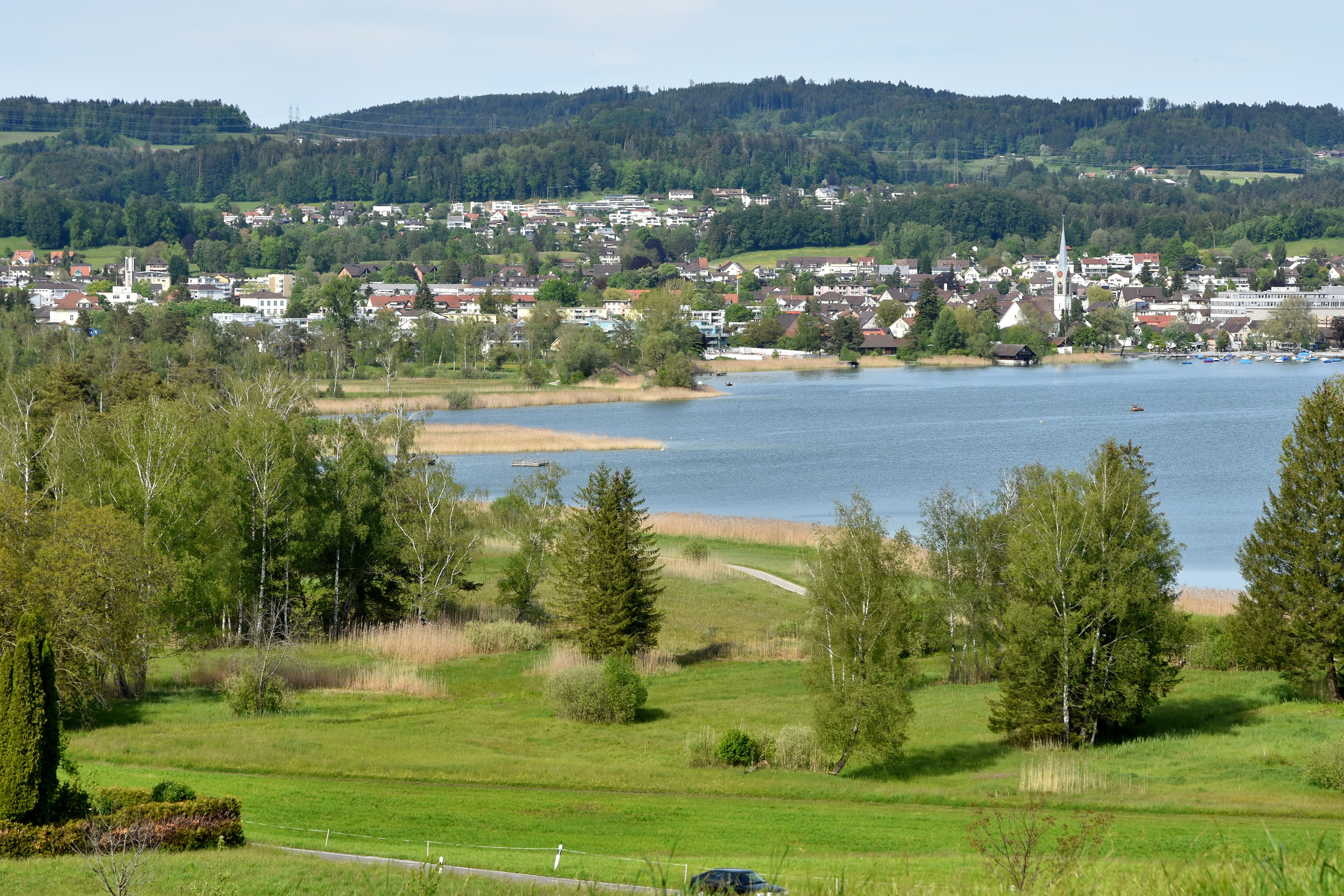

- Flag Coat of arms
- Location of Pfäffikon
- Location within Switzerland Location within Canton of Zürich
- Coordinates: 47°22′N 8°47′E
- Country: Switzerland
- Canton: Zürich
- District: Pfäffikon

Government
  - Mayor: Marco Hirzel

Area
  - Total: 19.54 km^{2} (7.54 sq mi)
- Elevation: 547 m (1,795 ft)

Population (December 2020)
  - Total: 12,174
  - Density: 623.0/km^{2} (1,614/sq mi)
- Time zone: UTC+01:00 (CET)
  - Summer (DST): UTC+02:00 (CEST)
- Postal code: 8330
- SFOS number: 177
- ISO 3166 code: CH-ZH
- Localities: Auslikon, Ober Balm, Unter Balm, Bussenhausen, Irgenhausen, Oberwil, Sulzberg, Hermatswil, Schür, Wallikon, Rick, Ravensbühl, Faichrüti, Rutschberg
- Surrounded by: Bäretswil, Bauma, Fehraltorf, Hittnau, Russikon, Seegräben, Uster, Wetzikon, Wildberg
- Website: www.pfaeffikon.ch

Pfäffikon (German pronunciation: [ˈpfɛfikɔn]) is a municipality in the canton of Zürich in Switzerland. It is the seat of the district of the same name. It is not to be confused with Pfäffikon SZ on Lake Zurich but in the canton of Schwyz.

== History ==
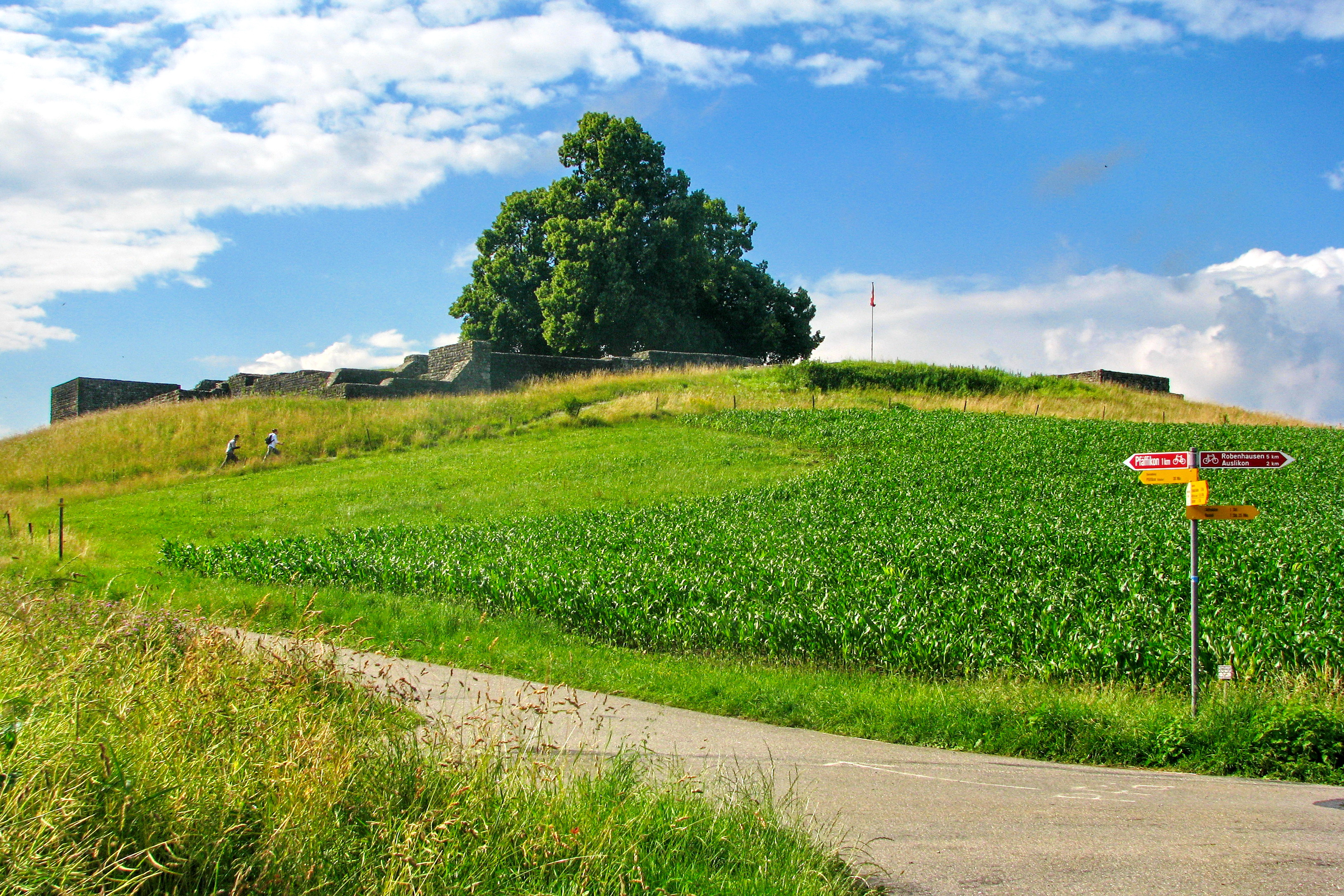
The Roman Irgenhausen Castrum as seen from nearby Auslikon

In Roman era, along Pfäffikersee there was built a Roman road from the vicus Centum Prata (Kempraten) on Obersee–Lake Zürich via Vitudurum (Oberwinterthur) to Tasgetium (Eschenz) to the Rhine. To secure this important transport route, the Irgenhausen Castrum was built. The native name of the fort is unknown, thus Irgenhausen was mentioned in 811 AD as Camputuna sive Irincheshusa. Maybe the castrum's name was Cambodunum, the name of the neighbouring village of Kempten (Wetzikon).

Pfäffikon is first mentioned in 811 as faffinchova. In 965 it was mentioned as haffinchova.

== Geography ==
Aerial view by Walter Mittelholzer (1919)

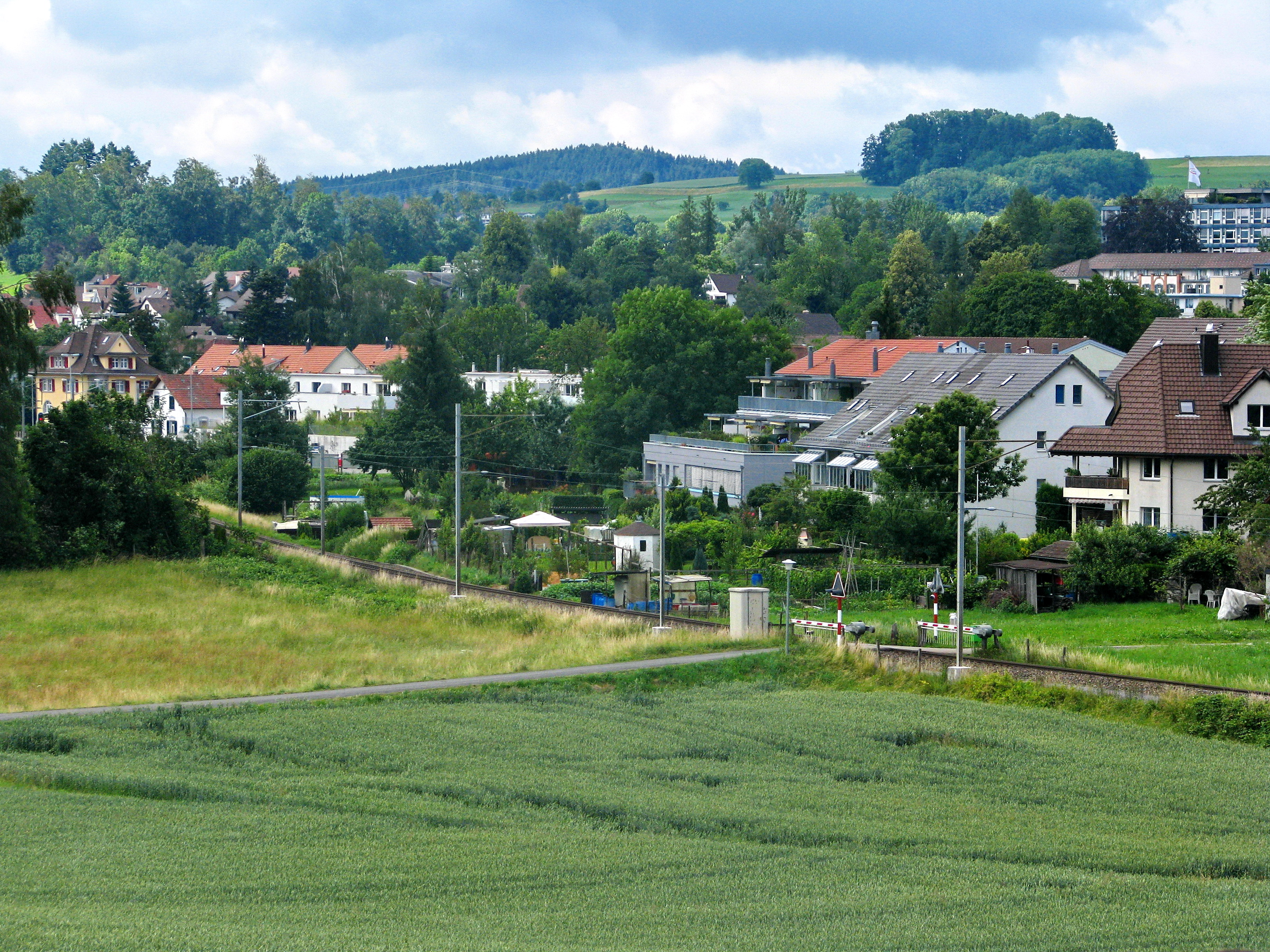
Pfäffikon-Irgenhausen

Pfäffikon has an area of 19.5 km^{2} (7.5 sq mi). Of this area, 43.3% is used for agricultural purposes, while 23.4% is forested. Of the rest of the land, 16.7% is settled (buildings or roads) and the remainder (16.5%) is non-productive (rivers, glaciers or mountains). In 1996 housing and buildings made up 11.9% of the total area, while transportation infrastructure made up the rest (4.8%). Of the total unproductive area, water (streams and lakes) made up 11.4% of the area. As of 2007 13.6% of the total municipal area was undergoing some type of construction.

Pfäffikon is situated on Pfäffikersee in Zürcher Oberland southeastern of the city of Zürich. Neighbouring municipalities are Bäretswil, Bauma, Fehraltorf, Hittnau, Russikon, Seegräben, Uster, Wetzikon and Wildberg.

The town is divided into four districts (Aussenwachten), namely Auslikon, Irgenhausen and Rutschberg situated on Pfäffikersee, as well as the districts of Ober Balm, Unter Balm, Bussenhausen, Oberwil, Sulzberg, Hermatswil, Schür, Wallikon, Rick, Ravensbühl, and Faichrüti.

== Demographics ==
Pfäffikon has a population (as of 31 December 2020) of 12,174. As of 2007, 17.6% of the population was made up of foreign nationals. As of 2008 the gender distribution of the population was 49% male and 51% female. Over the last 10 years the population has grown at a rate of 12.1%. Most of the population (as of 2000) speaks German (86.9%), with Italian being second most common ( 4.6%) and Albanian being third ( 2.3%).

In the 2007 election the most popular party was the SVP which received 37.8% of the vote. The next three most popular parties were the SPS (15.4%), the CSP (14.5%) and the Green Party (10.7%).

The age distribution of the population (as of 2000) is children and teenagers (0–19 years old) make up 23.5% of the population, while adults (20–64 years old) make up 62% and seniors (over 64 years old) make up 14.5%. In Pfäffikon about 73.3% of the population (between age 25-64) have completed either non-mandatory upper secondary education or additional higher education (either university or a Fachhochschule). There are 3954 households in Pfäffikon.

Pfäffikon has an unemployment rate of 2.52%. As of 2005, there were 200 people employed in the primary economic sector and about 58 businesses involved in this sector. 1635 people are employed in the secondary sector and there are 99 businesses in this sector. 2379 people are employed in the tertiary sector, with 352 businesses in this sector. As of 2007 50% of the working population were employed full-time, and 50% were employed part-time.

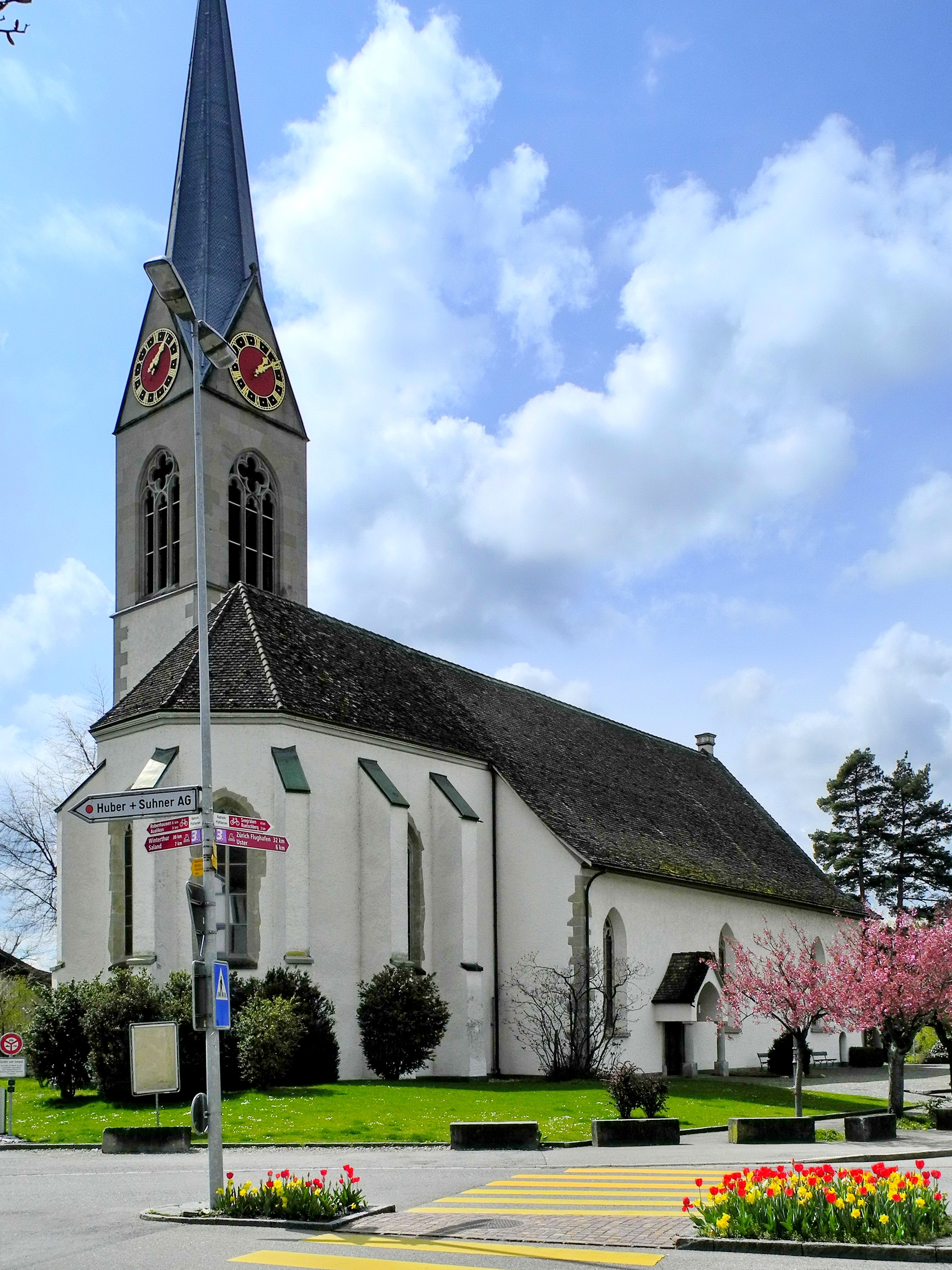
Protestant church

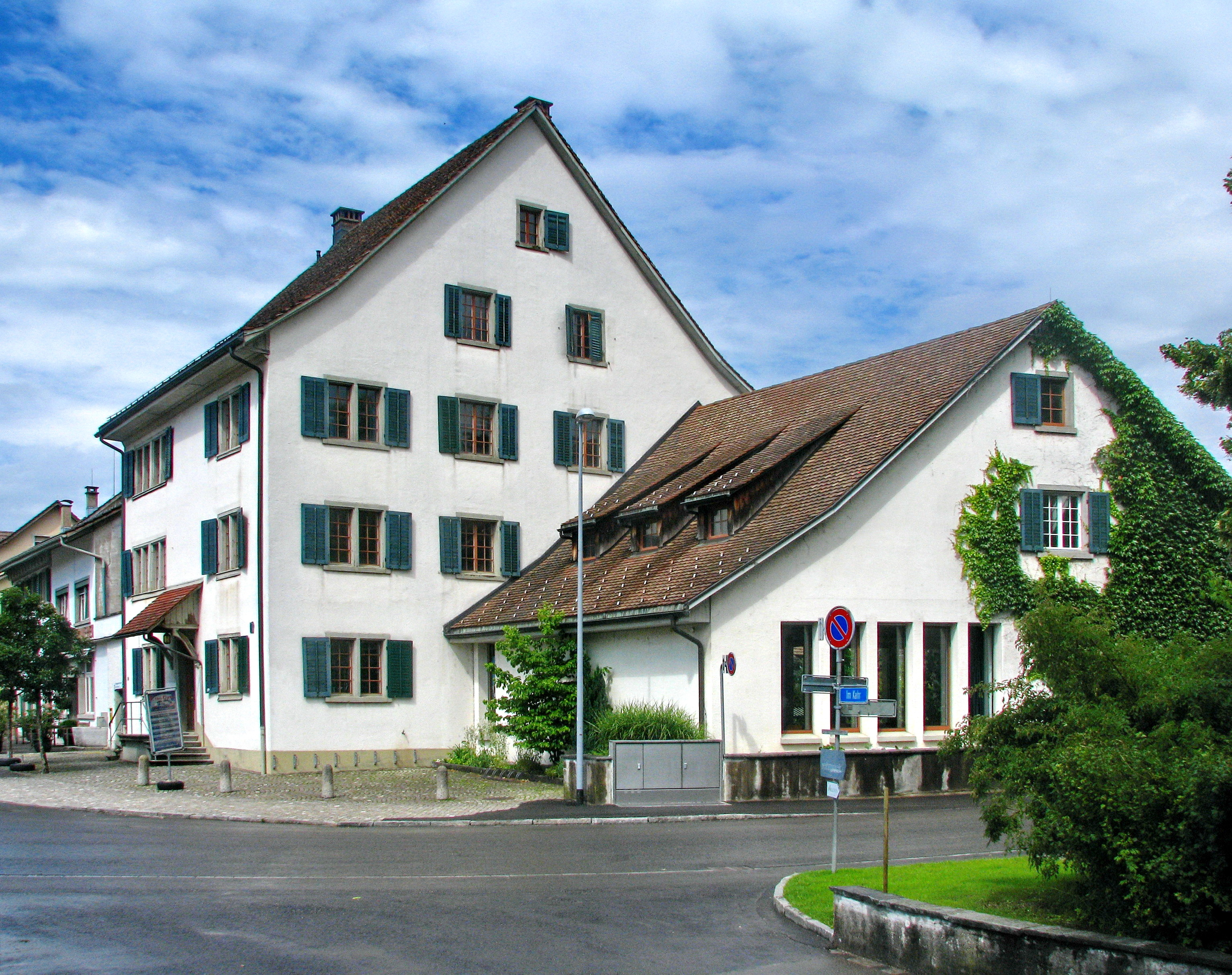
Pfarrhaus (rectory) and community hall

As of 2008 there were 2549 Catholics and 4771 Protestants in Pfäffikon. In the 2000 census, religion was broken down into several smaller categories. From the census, 52.5% were some type of Protestant, with 48.6% belonging to the Swiss Reformed Church and 4% belonging to other Protestant churches. 27.3% of the population were Catholic. Of the rest of the population, 0% were Muslim, 7.5% belonged to another religion (not listed), 2.4% did not give a religion, and 9.5% were atheist or agnostic.

The historical population is given in the following table:

Year	Population
1463	385
1634	786
1799	2,271
1850	2,896
1860	3,066
1900	2,986
1950	4,784
1970	7,586
2000	9,592
2005	9,920

== Weather ==
Pfäffikon has an average of 139.3 days of rain per year and on average receives 1,162 mm (45.7 in) of precipitation. The wettest month is August during which time Pfäffikon receives an average of 136 mm (5.4 in) of precipitation. During the wettest month, August, there is precipitation for an average of 12.3 days. The month with the most days of precipitation is May, with an average of 13.4, but with only 112 mm (4.4 in) of precipitation.

== Transportation ==
Pfäffikon ZH railway station is a stop of the S-Bahn Zürich on the line S3.

== Notable people ==
- Bernhard Hirzel (1807–1847) a Swiss theologian and Orientalist, became pastor in Pfäffikon in 1837
- Jakob Heusser-Staub (1862–1941) a Swiss industrialist and philanthropist
- Florian Froehlich (born 1959 in Pfaeffikon) a contemporary artist who creates paintings, sculptures, stained-glass and installations
- Darije Kalezić (born 1969 in Pfäffikon) a Bosnian-Herzegovinian and Swiss former footballer, 220 club caps

== Town Twinning ==
Pfäffikon was twinned with:

- Tranås, Sweden
