= Pfäffikon District =

Coordinates: 47°24′N 8°47′E

Pfäffikon District Bezirk Pfäffikon
- District
- Flag Coat of arms
- Country: Switzerland
- Canton: Zürich
- Capital: Pfäffikon

Area
  - Total: 163.55 km^{2} (63.15 sq mi)

Population (31 December 2020)
  - Total: 61,081
  - Density: 373.47/km^{2} (967.28/sq mi)
- Time zone: UTC+1 (CET)
  - Summer (DST): UTC+2 (CEST)
- Municipalities: 10

Pfäffikon District is one of the twelve districts of the German-speaking canton of Zürich, Switzerland. Its capital is the town of Pfäffikon.

== Municipalities ==
Pfäffikon contains a total of ten municipalities:

| Municipality | Population (31 December 2020) | Area, km^{2} |
|---|---|---|
| Bauma | 4,881 | 29.53 |
| Fehraltorf | 6,574 | 9.47 |
| Hittnau | 3,733 | 12.96 |
| Illnau-Effretikon | 17,352 | 32.91 |
| Lindau | 5,585 | 11.99 |
| Pfäffikon | 12,174 | 19.52 |
| Russikon | 4,410 | 14.21 |
| Weisslingen | 3,365 | 12.81 |
| Wila | 1,998 | 9.19 |
| Wildberg | 1,009 | 10.57 |
| Total | 61,081 | 163.55 |

== Mergers and name changes ==
- On 1 January 2015 the former municipalities of Sternenberg and Bauma merged to form the new municipality of Bauma with a new SFOS number.
- On 1 January 2016 the municipality Kyburg merged into Illnau-Effretikon.

== See also ==
- Municipalities of the canton of Zürich
