= Christian Social Party (Switzerland) =

Swiss political party

- German name: Christlich-soziale Partei (CSP)
- French name: Parti chrétien-social (PCS)
- Italian name: Partito Cristiano Sociale (PCS)
- Romansh name: Partida cristiansociala de la Svizra (PCS)
- President: Marius Achermann
- Members of the Federal Council: None
- Founded: 21 June 1997
- Split from: Christian Democratic People's Party of Switzerland
- Headquarters: Eichenstrasse 79; 3184 Wünnewil
- Membership (2011): 1,500
- Ideology: Christian left Social democracy Environmentalism
- Political position: Centre-left
- Colours: Turquoise
- National Council: 0 / 200
- Council of States: 0 / 46
- Cantonal Executives: 1 / 154
- Cantonal legislatures: 15 / 2,609

Website
- csp-pcs.ch

Logo used before 2015

The Christian Social Party (CSP) (German: Christlich-soziale Partei, French: Parti chrétien-social) is a political party in Switzerland of the Christian left. The CSP is more aligned with social democracy than the other major Christian party, the Christian Democratic People's Party of Switzerland (CVP), which is more economically liberal. With the moderate Christian left as its background, the CSP commits itself to social-democratic and environmentalist political solutions. The core principles of the CSP contain, among others, "a secure and dignified existence, solidarity, and deep mutual respect."

== Electoral power ==
As of 2016, the CSP does not hold any seats in the National Council of Switzerland.

A seat in the lower house was once held for decades by Hugo Fasel representing the canton of Fribourg.

On a cantonal level, the CSP has many elected members, mainly in the Roman Catholic cantons of Valais, Fribourg, Obwalden and Jura. In the latter, the CSP had until late 2010 one elected member in the Executive body, the Conseil d'Etat of the Republic of Jura (where it operates as the Independent Christian Social Party).

== Positions ==
A member of the Christian left, the CSP is a centre-left political party overall and has strong environmentalist views. It also has social values and aims to tax richer people. On a societal point of view, it has more progressive views and acts in favour of abortion rights, same-sex relationships and euthanasia, which differs strongly with other common Christian political parties, which are traditionally socially conservative.

== See also ==
- Christian socialism
