= Municipalities of the canton of Zurich =

There are 160 municipalities in the canton of Zurich in Switzerland.

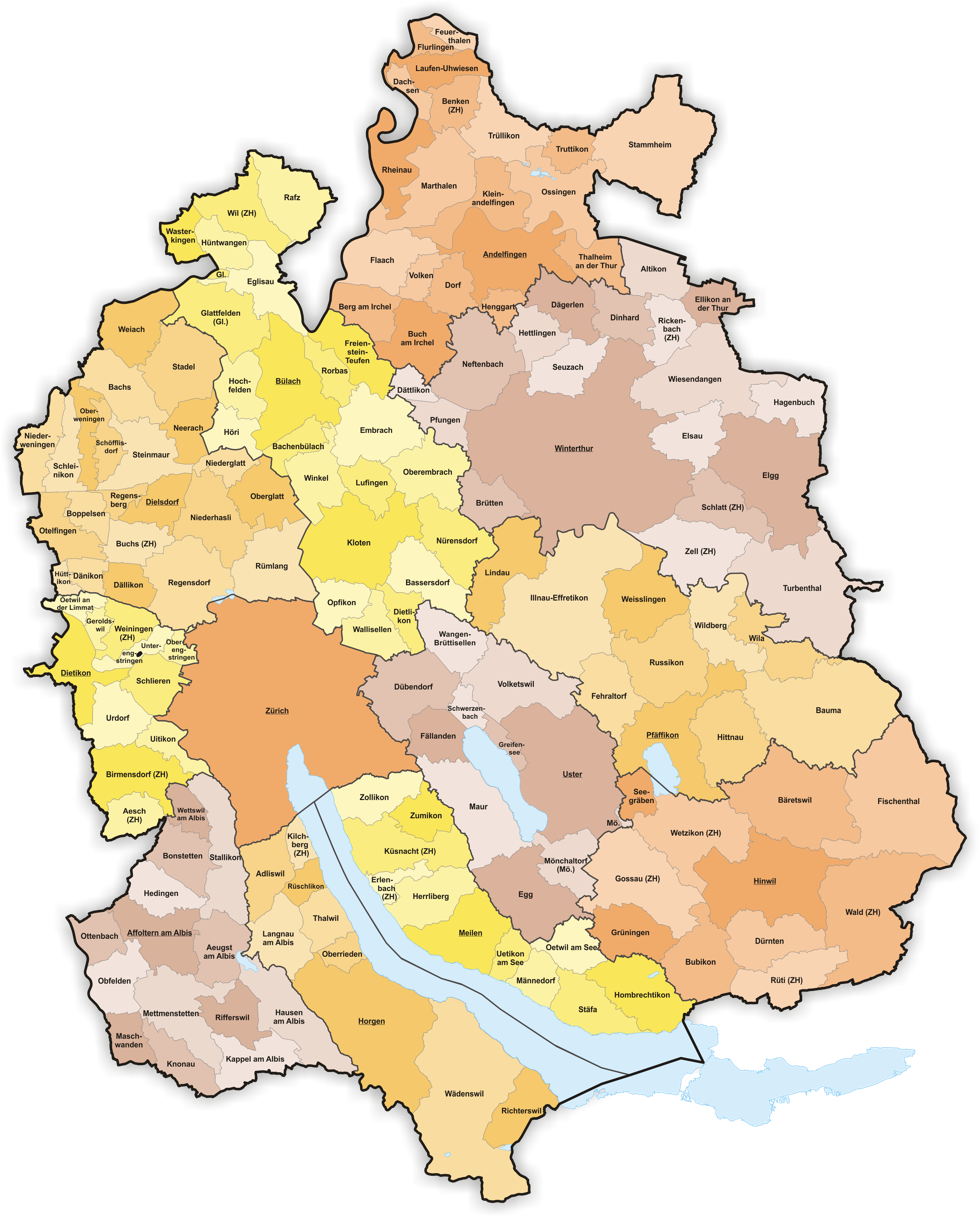
Municipalities in the canton of Zurich

In general, municipalities (German: Politische Gemeinden) in Switzerland are grouped in districts (Bezirke), their capital municipalities are written in bold letters.

== Mergers of municipalities ==
There were no changes between 1934 and 2013, but between 2014 and 2023, there were eight mergers.

- 2014: Bertschikon bei Attikon and Wiesendangen → Wiesendangen
- 2015: Bauma and Sternenberg → Bauma
- 2016: Kyburg and Illnau-Effretikon → Illnau-Effretikon
- 2018: Hirzel and Horgen → Horgen
- 2018: Elgg and Hofstetten → Elgg
- 2019: Oberstammheim, Unterstammheim and Waltalingen → Stammheim
- 2019: Hütten, Schönenberg and Wädenswil → Wädenswil
- 2023: Adlikon, Andelfingen and Humlikon → Andelfingen

== List of the municipalities ==
Current municipalities of Canton Zürich as of 2023
Flag	Coat of arms	Municipality	Population (31 December 2020)	Area in km^{2}	Inhabitants/ km^{2}	District
Altikon	Altikon	Altikon	701	7.68	91	Winterthur
Adliswil	Adliswil	Adliswil	19,049	7.79	2,445	Horgen
Aesch	Aesch	Aesch (ZH)	1,709	5.24	326	Dietikon
Aeugst am Albis	Aeugst am Albis	Aeugst am Albis	2,014	7.87	256	Affoltern
Affoltern am Albis	Affoltern am Albis	Affoltern am Albis	12,289	10.56	1,164	Affoltern
Andelfingen ZH	Andelfingen ZH	Andelfingen	2,232	6.65	336	Andelfingen
Bachenbülach	Bachenbülach	Bachenbülach	4,188	4.25	985	Bülach
Bachs	Bachs	Bachs	613	9.12	67	Dielsdorf
Bäretswil	Bäretswil	Bäretswil	5,052	22.23	28	Hinwil
Bassersdorf	Bassersdorf	Bassersdorf	21,998	9.02	2,806	Bülach
Bauma	Bauma	Bauma	4,367	20.76	210	Pfäffikon
Benken	Benken	Benken (ZH)	856	5.67	151	Andelfingen
Berg am Irchel	Berg am Irchel	Berg am Irchel	595	7.06	84	Andelfingen
Birmensdorf	Birmensdorf ZH	Birmensdorf (ZH)	6,909	11.38	607	Dietikon
Bonstetten	Bonstetten	Bonstetten	5,610	7.42	756	Affoltern
Boppelsen	Boppelsen	Boppelsen	1,472	3.94	374	Dielsdorf
Brütten	Brütten	Brütten	2,063	6.67	309	Winterthur
Bubikon	Bubikon	Bubikon	7,371	11.58	637	Hinwil
Buch am Irchel	Buch am Irchel	Buch am Irchel	1,022	10.26	100	Andelfingen
Buchs	Buchs ZH	Buchs (ZH)	6,555	5.87	1,117	Dielsdorf
Bülach	Bülach	Bülach	21,998	16.09	1,367	Bülach
Dachsen	Dachsen	Dachsen	1,917	2.69	713	Andelfingen
Dägerlen	Dägerlen	Dägerlen	1,037	7.90	131	Winterthur
Dällikon	Dällikon	Dällikon	4,278	4.50	951	Dielsdorf
Dänikon	Dänikon	Dänikon	1,846	2.80	659	Dielsdorf
Dättlikon	Dättlikon	Dättlikon	797	2.87	278	Winterthur
Dielsdorf	Dielsdorf	Dielsdorf	5,968	5.86	1,018	Dielsdorf
Dietikon	Dietikon	Dietikon	28,057	9.33	3,007	Dietikon
Dietlikon	Dietlikon	Dietlikon	7,875	4.26	1,849	Bülach
Dinhard	Dinhard	Dinhard	1,741	7.15	243	Winterthur
Dorf	Dorf ZH	Dorf	666	5.55	120	Andelfingen
Dübendorf	Dübendorf	Dübendorf	29,907	13.61	2,197	Uster
Dürnten	Dürnten	Dürnten	7,645	10.19	750	Hinwil
Egg ZH	Egg ZH	Egg	8,829	14.48	610	Uster
Eglisau	Eglisau	Eglisau	5,491	9.07	605	Bülach
Elgg	Elgg	Elgg	4,960	15.53	319	Winterthur
Elgg	Ellikon an der Thur	Ellikon an der Thur	936	4.92	190	Winterthur
Elsau	Elsau	Elsau	3,657	8.06	454	Winterthur
Embrach	Embrach	Embrach	9,610	12.72	756	Bülach
Erlenbach	Erlenbach ZH	Erlenbach (ZH)	5,606	2.97	1,888	Meilen
Fällanden	Fällanden	Fällanden	8,934	6.41	1,394	Uster
Fehraltorf	Fehraltorf	Fehraltorf	6,574	9.54	689	Pfäffikon
Feuerthalen	Feuerthalen	Feuerthalen	3,697	2.49	1,485	Andelfingen
Fischenthal	Fischenthal	Fischenthal	2,501	30.25	83	Hinwil
Flaach	Flaach	Flaach	1,430	10.16	141	Andelfingen
Flurlingen	Flurlingen	Flurlingen	1,552	2.40	647	Andelfingen
Freienstein-Teufen	Freienstein-Teufen	Freienstein-Teufen	2,397	8.32	288	Bülach
Geroldswil	Geroldswil	Geroldswil	5,046	1.91	2,642	Dietikon
Glattfelden	Glattfelden	Glattfelden	5,266	12.35	426	Bülach
Gossau	Gossau ZH	Gossau (ZH)	10,282	18.28	562	Hinwil
Greifensee	Greifensee	Greifensee	5,307	2.30	2,307	Uster
Grüningen	Grüningen ZH	Grüningen	3,716	8.77	424	Hinwil
Hagenbuch	Hagenbuch ZH	Hagenbuch	1,095	8.17	134	Winterthur
Hausen am Albis	Hausen am Albis	Hausen am Albis	3,801	13.64	279	Affoltern
Hedingen	Hedingen	Hedingen	3,795	6.59	576	Affoltern
Henggart	Henggart	Henggart	2,293	3.01	762	Andelfingen
Herrliberg	Herrliberg	Herrliberg	6,567	8.97	732	Meilen
Hettlingen ZH	Hettlingen ZH	Hettlingen	3,101	5.87	528	Winterthur
Hinwil	Hinwil	Hinwil	11,354	22.31	509	Hinwil
Hittnau	Hittnau	Hittnau	3,733	12.92	289	Pfäffikon
Hochfelden	Hochfelden	Hochfelden	2,020	6.16	328	Bülach
Hombrechtikon	Hombrechtikon	Hombrechtikon	8,815	12.19	723	Meilen
Horgen	Horgen	Horgen	23,090	21.07	1,096	Horgen
Höri	Höri	Höri	2,951	4.85	608	Bülach
Hüntwangen	Hüntwangen	Hüntwangen	1,067	4.97	215	Bülach
Hüttikon	Hüttikon	Hüttikon	951	1.60	594	Dielsdorf
Illnau-Effretikon	Illnau-Effretikon	Illnau-Effretikon	16,298	25.28	645	Pfäffikon
Kappel am Albis	Kappel am Albis	Kappel am Albis	1,245	7.87	158	Affoltern
Kilchberg ZH	Kilchberg ZH	Kilchberg (ZH)	9,207	2.58	3,569	Horgen
Kleinandelfingen	Kleinandelfingen	Kleinandelfingen	2,104	10.36	203	Andelfingen
Kloten	Kloten	Kloten	20,429	19.28	1,060	Bülach
Knonau	Knonau	Knonau	2,369	6.48	366	Affoltern
Küsnacht ZH	Küsnacht ZH	Küsnacht (ZH)	14,811	12.35	1,199	Meilen
Langnau am Albis	Langnau am Albis	Langnau am Albis	7,902	8.66	912	Horgen
Laufen-Uhwiesen	Laufen-Uhwiesen	Laufen-Uhwiesen	1,779	6.27	284	Andelfingen
Lindau	Lindau	Lindau	5,585	11.96	467	Pfäffikon
Lufingen	Lufingen	Lufingen	2,562	5.22	491	Bülach
Männedorf	Männedorf	Männedorf	11,397	4.78	2,384	Meilen
Marthalen	Marthalen	Marthalen	1,933	14.11	137	Andelfingen
Maschwanden	Maschwanden	Maschwanden	641	4.67	137	Affoltern
Maur	Maur	Maur	10,780	14.83	727	Uster
Meilen	Meilen	Meilen	14,539	11.93	1,219	Meilen
Mettmenstetten	Mettmenstetten	Mettmenstetten	5,380	13.11	410	Affoltern
Mönchaltorf	Mönchaltorf	Mönchaltorf	4,082	7.62	536	Uster
Neerach	Neerach	Neerach	3,229	6.01	537	Dielsdorf
Neftenbach	Neftenbach	Neftenbach	5,756	14.95	385	Winterthur
Niederglatt	Niederglatt	Niederglatt	4,938	3.62	1,364	Dielsdorf
Niederhasli	Niederhasli	Niederhasli	9,449	11.24	841	Dielsdorf
Niederweningen	Niederweningen	Niederweningen	3,089	6.88	449	Dielsdorf
Nürensdorf	Nürensdorf	Nürensdorf	5,628	10.09	558	Bülach
Oberembrach	Oberembrach	Oberembrach	1,105	10.20	108	Bülach
Oberengstringen	Oberengstringen	Oberengstringen	6,721	2.13	3,155	Dietikon
Oberglatt	Oberglatt	Oberglatt	7,386	8.29	891	Dielsdorf
Oberrieden ZH	Oberrieden ZH	Oberrieden	5,122	2.76	1,856	Horgen
Oberweningen	Oberweningen	Oberweningen	1,897	4.86	390	Dielsdorf
Obfelden	Obfelden	Obfelden	5,779	7.54	766	Affoltern
Oetwil am See	Oetwil am See	Oetwil am See	4,857	6.09	798	Meilen
Oetwil an der Limmat	Oetwil an der Limmat	Oetwil an der Limmat	2,529	2.76	916	Dietikon
Opfikon	Opfikon	Opfikon	20,954	5.61	3,735	Bülach
Ossingen	Ossingen	Ossingen	1,724	13.07	132	Andelfingen
Otelfingen	Otelfingen	Otelfingen	2,943	7.23	407	Dielsdorf
Ottenbach	Ottenbach	Ottenbach	2,704	4.98	543	Affoltern
Pfäffikon ZH	Pfäffikon ZH	Pfäffikon	12,174	19.54	623	Pfäffikon
Pfungen	Pfungen	Pfungen	3,948	4.99	791	Winterthur
Rafz	Rafz	Rafz	4,628	10.74	431	Bülach
Regensberg	Regensberg	Regensberg	459	2.39	192	Dielsdorf
Regensdorf	Regensdorf	Regensdorf	18,568	14.62	1,270	Dielsdorf
Rheinau ZH	Rheinau ZH	Rheinau	1,287	8.96	144	Andelfingen
Richterswil	Richterswil	Richterswil	13,670	7.54	1,813	Horgen
Rickenbach ZH	Rickenbach ZH	Rickenbach (ZH)	2,796	6.03	464	Winterthur
Rifferswil	Rifferswil	Rifferswil	1,148	6.50	177	Affoltern
Rorbas	Rorbas	Rorbas	2,885	4.44	650	Bülach
Rümlang	Rümlang	Rümlang	8,277	12.39	668	Dielsdorf
Rüschlikon	Rüschlikon	Rüschlikon	6,113	2.94	2,079	Horgen
Russikon	Russikon	Russikon	4,410	14.37	307	Pfäffikon
Rüti ZH	Rüti ZH	Rüti (ZH)	12,494	10.19	1,226	Hinwil
Schlatt ZH	Schlatt ZH	Schlatt (ZH)	779	9.03	86	Winterthur
Schleinikon	Schleinikon	Schleinikon	858	5.65	152	Dielsdorf
Schlieren	Schlieren	Schlieren	19,881	6.58	3,021	Dietikon
Schöfflisdorf	Schöfflisdorf	Schöfflisdorf	1,394	4.05	344	Dielsdorf
Schwerzenbach	Schwerzenbach	Schwerzenbach	5,193	2.64	1,967	Uster
Seegräben	Seegräben	Seegräben	1,427	3.75	381	Hinwil
Seuzach	Seuzach	Seuzach	7,420	7.56	981	Winterthur
Stadel	Stadel	Stadel	2,336	12.85	182	Dielsdorf
Stäfa	Stäfa	Stäfa	14,791	8.59	1,722	Meilen
Stallikon	Stallikon	Stallikon	3,783	12.01	315	Affoltern
Stammheim	Stammheim	Stammheim	2,859	2.393	1,195	Andelfingen
Steinmaur	Steinmaur	Steinmaur	3,583	9.39	382	Dielsdorf
Thalheim an der Thur	Thalheim an der Thur	Thalheim an der Thur	949	6.44	147	Andelfingen
Thalwil	Thalwil	Thalwil	18,278	5.53	3,305	Horgen
Trüllikon	Trüllikon	Trüllikon	1,055	9.52	111	Andelfingen
Truttikon	Truttikon	Truttikon	449	4.42	102	Andelfingen
Turbenthal	Turbenthal	Turbenthal	4,983	25.07	199	Winterthur
Uetikon am See	Uetikon am See	Uetikon am See	6,225	3.49	1,784	Meilen
Uitikon	Uitikon	Uitikon	4,809	4.38	1,098	Dietikon
Unterengstringen	Unterengstringen	Unterengstringen	3,984	3.32	1,200	Dietikon
Urdorf	Urdorf	Urdorf	10,019	7.62	1,315	Dietikon
Uster	Uster	Uster	35,337	28.56	1,237	Uster
Volken	Volken	Volken	383	3.21	119	Andelfingen
Volketswil	Volketswil	Volketswil	18,865	14.00	1,348	Uster
Wädenswil	Wädenswil	Wädenswil	21,792	17.37	1,255	Horgen
Wald ZH	Wald ZH	Wald (ZH)	10,200	25.25	404	Hinwil
Wallisellen	Wallisellen	Wallisellen	17,218	6.50	2,649	Bülach
Wangen-Brüttisellen	Wangen-Brüttisellen	Wangen-Brüttisellen	8,000	7.90	1,013	Uster
Wasterkingen	Wasterkingen	Wasterkingen	568	3.95	144	Bülach
Weiach	Weiach	Weiach	1,990	9.57	208	Dielsdorf
Weiningen ZH	Weiningen ZH	Weiningen (ZH)	4,869	5.41	900	Dietikon
Weisslingen	Weisslingen	Weisslingen	3,365	12.81	263	Pfäffikon
Wettswil am Albis	Wettswil am Albis	Wettswil am Albis	5,281	3.77	1,401	Affoltern
Wetzikon	Wetzikon	Wetzikon	25,056	16.73	1,498	Hinwil
Wiesendangen	Wiesendangen	Wiesendangen	4,955	9.68	512	Winterthur
Wil ZH	Wil ZH	Wil (ZH)	1,488	8.94	166	Bülach
Wila	Wila	Wila	1,998	9.21	217	Pfäffikon
Wildberg	Wildberg	Wildberg	1,009	10.83	93	Pfäffikon
Winkel	Winkel	Winkel	4,648	8.16	570	Bülach
Winterthur	Winterthur	Winterthur	114,220	67.93	1,681	Winterthur
Zell ZH	Zell ZH	Zell (ZH)	6,430	12.70	506	Winterthur
Zollikon	Zollikon	Zollikon	13,311	7.84	1,698	Meilen
Zumikon	Zumikon	Zumikon	5,587	5.44	1,027	Meilen
Zürich	Zürich	Zurich	421,878	91.88	4,592	Zürich
Zürich	Zürich	Canton of Zurich	1,553,423	1,728.95	898	—

== Notes ==
Partially based on the article in the German Wikipedia.
