= Pfaffhausen =

Coordinates: 47°22′00″N 008°37′00″E

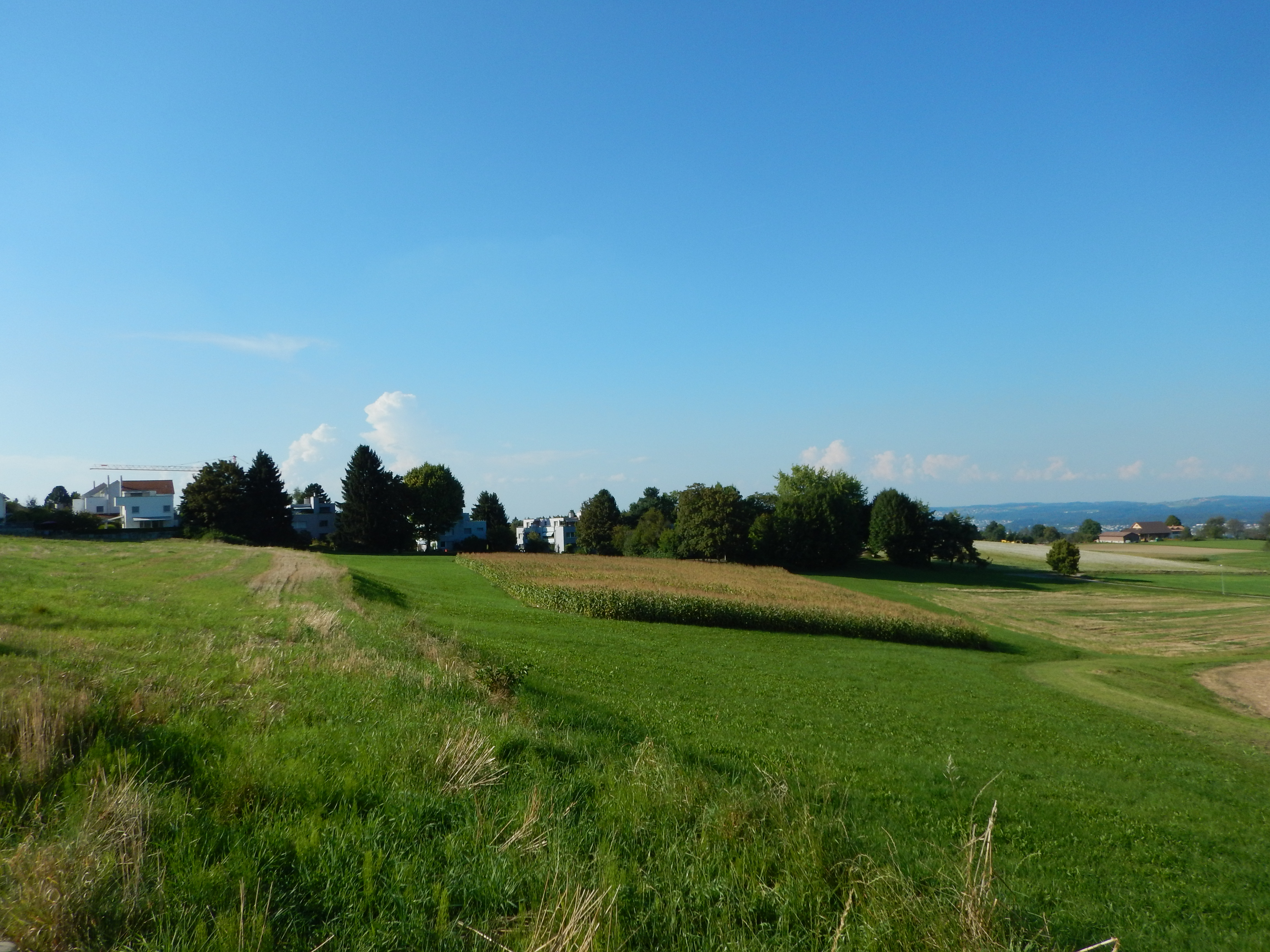
Pfaffhausen towards west

Pfaffhausen (also known as Pffaffhausen) is a settlement in the municipality of Fällanden in the canton of Zürich, Switzerland. It has an elevation of 597 m, and lies in the valley between the northern flank of the Öschbrig and the southeastern slope of the Adlisberg. Pfaffhausen borders the Zürich quarter of Witikon to the west, the settlement of Binz (belonging to Maur) to the south, and the settlement of Benglen, also part of Fällanden, to the east. It is very easily accessible by public transportation from Zurich and Volketswil.
