= Association of Islamic Organizations in Zurich =

Largest cantonal Islamic umbrella organization in Switzerland

Coordinates: 47.3897°N 8.5396°E

Association of Islamic Organizations in Zurich Vereinigung der Islamischen Organisationen in Zürich
- Abbreviation: VIOZ
- Formation: 1995
- Headquarters: Zurich, CH
- Members: 36 Islamic Organizations
- Affiliations: more than 40 Zurich member Masjids
- Website: www.vioz.ch

The Association of Islamic Organizations in Zurich (VIOZ; German: Vereinigung der Islamischen Organisationen in Zürich) was founded in 1995 and is with more than 30 member organizations the largest cantonal Islamic umbrella organization in Switzerland. VIOZ member organizations operate over 40 mosques in the Canton of Zurich, which represents about 90% of all Zurich masjids.

VIOZ cooperates with two national organizations, the Federation of Islamic Umbrella Organizations in Switzerland (FIDS) and the Coordination of Islamic Organisations Switzerland (KIOS). Since March 2019 VIOZ is a member of FIDS.

VIOZ is the longtime partner of the city and the Canton of Zurich and is committed to the interests of the Muslims and their affiliates in the spirit of consensus.

In addition, VIOZ is constantly in contact with the state and other religious and social institutions becoming a co-designer of the Inter-religious dialogue in the canton of Zurich.

== Mission ==
In cooperation with the authorities, Muslim graves could be realized in the cities of Zurich and Winterthur. Moreover, VIOZ offers volunteer training for mosque guides and could thus ensure that masjid tours are carried out by qualified persons. VIOZ organized several years the "Day of open mosques" in the Canton of Zurich and offers year-round mosque tours for those interested.

With the support of the Canton of Zurich, VIOZ was able to start a 2-year pilot project in 2014 for Muslim spiritual care services (MNFS). In this context, a 24-hour emergency number supported by Islamic specific ( CIG ) as well as emergency-pastoral (NNPN) trained Muslim Care Takers is available.

On July 1, 2016 the one-year pilot project for Muslim pastoral care within the Swiss Federal Asylum Centers started with VIOZ as a partner organization under the State Secretariat for Migration (SEM). During the pilot phase, the SEM is responsible for Muslim spiritual care. The applicants, who were recommended to the SEM by VIOZ, had to fulfill a list of criteria drawn up by the official Swiss Churches and the SEM. The catalog is based on the procedural provisions for the admission and withdrawal of prisons from the canton of Zurich. Both VIOZ, as well as the individuals recommended, were examined by the federal intelligence service and SEM internally.

The Government Council of the Canton of Zurich declared in December 2017 the commitment to collaborate with formally not yet recognized religious communities. Also, the Swiss Government included at the same time the Muslim spiritual care when releasing the national action plan (NAP) aimed at preventing radicalization and violent extremism. Furthermore, the NAP requests that Cantons provide adequate education possibilities for Muslim Care Takers. On February 22, 2018, the Canton of Zurich informed the public about the new Muslim spiritual care services for public hospitals and emergency services (MSNS). The MSNS has been established by the Canton Zurich, the officially recognized Zurich churches, and VIOZ as an official partner. Therewith, the Zurich Department of Justice and Home Affairs mandated the MSNS for a 3-year pilot project. Before operational, Muslim Care Takers will be quality and security examined within a multilevel assessment process. Training and Education have been assigned to the Swiss Center of Islam and Society at the University of Fribourg.

VIOZ also deals with community topics and has thus commissioned, within the scope of a student internship, to find out how environmentally conscious its members' organizations behave, the importance of environment-conscious behavior in Islam, and how to draw Muslims' attention to the topic. As a result, an environmental brochure was developed, which is accessible online.

In addition, the strategic goals include the creation of grave fields for the Muslim population, a Central Zurich Mosque as well as an official recognition as a public community of faith by the Canton of Zurich. Further topics include youth work, preventing extremism, and general pastoral care in hospitals, prisons and asylum centers.

== Affiliates (as of 12.2017) ==
- Stiftung Islamische Gemeinschaft Zürich (SIGZ), Rötelstrasse 86, 8057 Zürich
- Dzemat der Islamischen Gemeinschaften Bosniens in Zürich, Grabenstrasse 7, 8952 Schlieren
- Verband der Islamischen Kulturzentren, Birmensdorferstrasse 273, 8055 Zürich
- Föderation der Islamischen Vereine in der Schweiz, Calandastrasse 11, 8048 Zürich
- Islamisches Zentrum Zürich, Müllackerstrasse 36, 8152 Glattbrugg
- Türkisch-Islamischer idealistischer Verein der Schweiz, Buckhauserstrasse 40, 8048 Zürich
- Türkisch-Islamische Stiftung für die Schweiz, Schwamendingenstrasse 102, 8050 Zürich
- Albanisch-Islamische Gemeinschaft, Rautistrasse 58, 8048 Zürich
- Swiss Muslim Society, Weinbergstrasse 147, 8006 Zürich
- Gemeinschaft der Kosovo Bosniaken, Industriestrasse 28, 8304 Wallisellen
- Verein für islamische Religionspädagogik Schweiz (VIRPS), Murzlenstr. 62, 8166 Niederweningen
- Verein für Islamische Kultur, Borrweg 60, 8055 Zürich
- Forum des Orients in der Schweiz, Hafnerstrasse 41, 8005 Zürich
- Mevlana Kultur Verein; Im Schörli 25, 8600 Dübendorf
- Türkisch-Islamischer Verein für die Schweiz Wädenswil Moschee, Florhofstrasse 7, 8820 Wädenswil
- Türkischer Verein, Theaterstrasse 25, 8400 Winterthur
- Albanisch-Islamischer Verein, Kronaustrasse 6, 8404 Winterthur
- Stiftung Islamisches Zentrum Volketswil, Juchstrasse 15, 8604 Volketswil
- Verein Percikan Iman, Verein südostasiatischer Muslime, 8000 Zürich
- Islamisch-Kultureller Verein Ahlebeyt, Grabenstrasse 7, 8952 Schlieren
- Kulturzentrum Sandzak, Hofstrasse 98, 8620 Wetzikon
- Islamische Gemeinschaft Kanton Zürich, Bahnstrasse 80, 8105 Regensdorf
- Islamische Gemeinschaft Volketswil Zürich IGVZ, Juchstrasse 15, 8604 Volketswil
- Blaue Moschee Merkez Zürich, Kochstrasse 22, 8004 Zürich
- Ummah, Muslimische Jugend Schweiz, 8000 Zürich
- Al Rahma Zentrum, Hohlstrasse 615a, 8048 Zürich
- Islamischer Kulturverein Embrach, Hardhofstrasse 15, 8424 Embrach
- Albanisch-Islamischer Kulturverein, Bahnhofstrasse 207, 8620 Wetzikon
- Kulturzentrum – Haus des Friedens, Saatlenstrasse 23, 8051 Zürich
- Islamischer Verein, Pumpwerkstrasse 26, 8105 Regensdorf
- Albanisch-Islamische Glaubensgemeinschaft Sunnah, Löwenstrasse 11, 8953 Dietikon
- Trägerverein Project Insert, Dörflistrasse 67, 8050 Zürich
- Somalisches Islamisches Kulturzentrum Schweiz, Eisgasse 6, 8004 Zürich
- Darut-lslah Verein, Loowiesenstrasse 28, 8106 Adtikon- Regensdorf
- Islamischer Albanischer Verein, Zürcherstrasse 300, 8406 Winterthur
- Kulturverein Ikre, Zürichstrasse 38a, 8306 Brüttisellen

== Intercultural and Religious Cooperation ==
=== Cantonal Cooperation (Zurich) ===
- Interreligious Round Table in Canton Zurich
- Zurich forum of religions
- Zurich Institute for Interreligious Dialogue (ZIID)
- Paulus Academy Zurich
- Cantonal Institute for integration
- Integration Department of the city of Zurich
- Integration Department of the city of Winterthur
- Zurich cantonal police 'Brückenbauer'
- Chaplaincy for prisons and hospitals
- Muslim emergency pastoral Zurich
- Funeral and cemetery department of the city of Zurich

=== National Cooperation ===
- Swiss Confederation - State Secretariat for Migration (SEM)
- Inter-religious Working Group in Switzerland (IRAS)
- Society for Minorities in Switzerland (GMS)
- National Coalition Building Institute (NCBI)
- palliative ostschweiz
