= Öschbrig =

Mountain in Switzerland

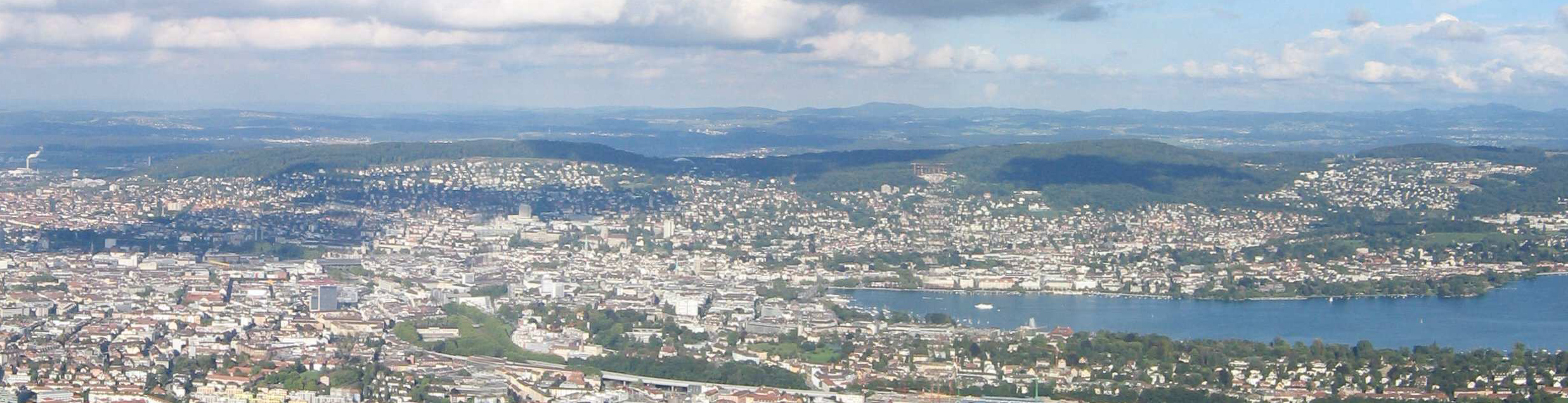
- Zürich seen from Uetliberg with, from left to right, Zürichberg, Adlisberg and Öschbrig

Highest point
- Elevation: 696 m (2,283 ft)
- Coordinates: 47°21′30″N 8°36′50″E

Geography
- Location: Zürich, Switzerland

Climbing
- Easiest route: bus from Zürich Klusplatz or Fällanden

Öschbrig (also known as Oetlisberg) with an elevation of 696 metres (2,283 ft), is a wooded mountain in Switzerland overlooking to the east Zürichsee (Lake Zürich).

== Geography ==
Öschbrig is a wooded mountain located to the east of the city of Zürich, between the Glatt river valley and Lake Zürich. Its highest point is about 200 metres (656 ft) above the Lake Zürich. The mountain is part of a chain of hills — among them Käferberg, Adlisberg and Pfannenstiel — between Greifensee (Lake Greifen) and Lake Zürich.

On the western flanks of the Öschbrig is located part of the Zürich quarter of Witikon. On the slope between the north side of the mountain and the southeast side of the Adlisberg is situated the hamlet of Pfaffhausen, belonging to the gemeinde of Fällanden.

== Origin of the name ==
Öschbrig is the Swiss German form of "Oetlisberg", which is the name given to the forest lying on the mountain. "Oetli" could be a family name or could derive from the alemannic male names Otmar or Otfrid. The name Öschbrig is first attested in 1492.

== Nature ==
The Öschbrig is covered with a larch forest, partially destroyed by the Lothar storm in December 1999. Douglas spruces, uncommon in this region, are also present, while the clearings created by Lothar have been colonized by beeches and ashes. In the forest live among others voracious deer.
