= Uster District =

Coordinates: 47°21′N 8°41′E

Uster District Bezirk Uster
- District
- Flag Coat of arms
- Country: Switzerland
- Canton: Zürich
- Capital: Uster

Area
  - Total: 112.35 km^{2} (43.38 sq mi)

Population (31 December 2020)
  - Total: 135,234
  - Density: 1,203.7/km^{2} (3,117.5/sq mi)
- Time zone: UTC+1 (CET)
  - Summer (DST): UTC+2 (CEST)
- Municipalities: 10

Uster District is one of the twelve districts of the canton of Zürich, Switzerland. Its capital is the city of Uster. The German-speaking district has a population of 135,234 (as of 31 December 2020).

== Municipalities ==
Uster contains a total of ten municipalities:

Municipality	Population (31 December 2020)	Area, km^{2}
Dübendorf	29,907	13.61
Egg	8,829	14.48
Fällanden	8,934	6.41
Greifensee	5,307	2.30
Maur	10,780	14.83
Mönchaltorf	4,082	7.62
Schwerzenbach	5,193	2.64
Uster	35,337	28.56
Volketswil	18,865	14.00
Wangen-Brüttisellen	8,000	7.90
Total	135,234	112.35

== See also ==
- Municipalities of the canton of Zürich
