= Ronny Keller =

Swiss ice hockey player

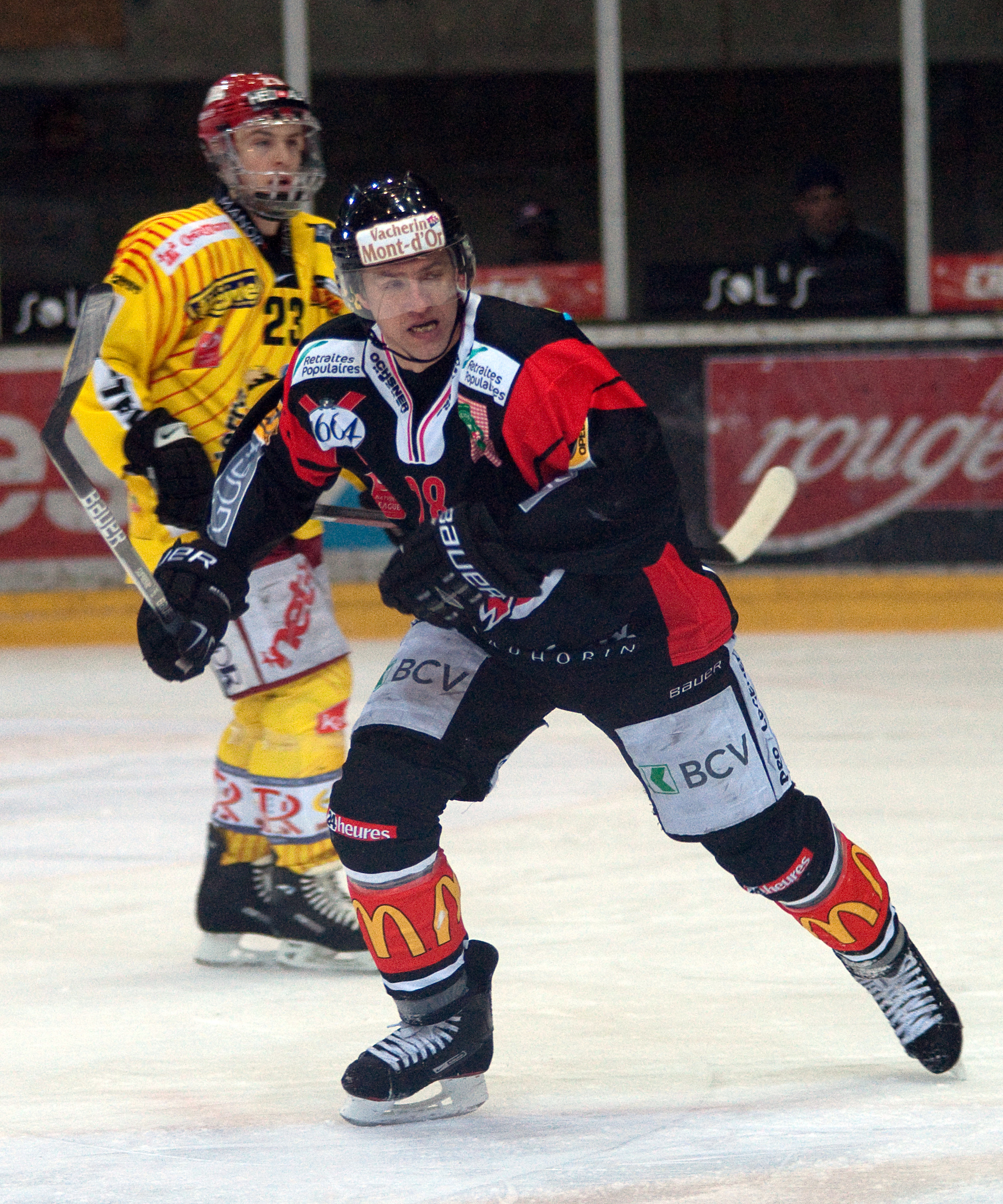
- Born: 6 October 1979 (age 45); Volketswil, Switzerland
- Height: 5 ft 9 in (175 cm)
- Weight: 176 lb (80 kg; 12 st 8 lb)
- Position: Defenceman
- Shot: Left
- Played for: National League A ZSC Lions; Kloten Flyers; Lausanne HC; Rapperswil-Jona Lakers National League B Grasshopper Club Zürich; EHC Basel; HC Thurgau; Lausanne HC; HC Sierre-Anniviers; EHC Olten Swiss 1. Liga; HC Thurgau
- National team: Switzerland
- Playing career: 1997–2013

Ronny Keller (born 6 October 1979) is a Swiss former ice hockey defenceman. Between 1997 and 2013, Keller played 14 seasons in the Swiss National League A (ZSC Lions, Kloten Flyers, Lausanne HC and Rapperswil-Jona Lakers) and National League B (Grasshopper Club Zürich, EHC Basel, Lausanne HC, HC Thurgau, HC Sierre-Anniviers and EHC Olten).

On March 5, 2013, Keller (who played for EHC Olten at the time) was checked from behind and into the boards by SC Langenthal forward Stefan Schnyder. He suffered significant damage to his fourth thoracic vertebra and was operated on the following day. On March 7 doctors announced that Keller's spinal cord injury would leave him a permanent paraplegic. The Swiss league opened a disciplinary investigation on the incident while SC Langenthal officials announced that Schnyder would sit out the remainder of the season.

== Career statistics ==
			Regular season					Playoffs
Season	Team	League	GP	G	A	Pts	PIM	GP	G	A	Pts	PIM
1996–97	Grasshoppers U20	Elite Jr. A	34	2	5	7	83	—	—	—	—	—
1997–98	SC Küsnacht	SwissDiv1	—	—	—	—	—	—	—	—	—	—
1997–98	Grasshoppers U20	Elite Jr. A	22	2	11	13	28	—	—	—	—	—
1997–98	Grasshopper Club Zürich	NLB	36	3	1	4	28	5	0	0	0	0
1998–99	Grasshopper Club Zürich	NLB	31	1	3	4	40	3	0	0	0	25
1998–99	ZSC Lions	NLA	4	0	0	0	0	7	0	0	0	0
1999–00	ZSC Lions	NLA	41	1	0	1	22	12	0	0	0	0
2000–01	Kloten Flyers	NLA	43	3	2	5	10	9	1	0	1	12
2001–02	Kloten Flyers	NLA	27	1	2	3	12	—	—	—	—	—
2002–03	Lausanne HC	NLA	44	1	4	5	48	—	—	—	—	—
2003–04	Lausanne HC	NLA	43	1	3	4	36	—	—	—	—	—
2004–05	Lausanne HC	NLA	22	0	0	0	10	—	—	—	—	—
2004–05	EHC Basel	NLB	17	2	3	5	12	19	1	9	10	26
2005–06	HC Thurgau	SwissDiv1	23	14	22	36	48	15	9	15	24	42
2006–07	HC Thurgau	NLB	42	4	23	27	96	—	—	—	—	—
2006–07	Lausanne HC	NLB	2	0	4	4	0	6	1	1	2	16
2007–08	HC Thurgau	NLB	2	0	0	0	0	—	—	—	—	—
2008–09	HC Sierre-Anniviers	NLB	41	9	25	34	62	6	2	1	3	16
2009–10	HC Sierre-Anniviers	NLB	46	12	24	36	106	11	3	5	8	18
2010–11	HC Sierre-Anniviers	NLB	43	7	45	52	42	4	2	2	4	6
2011–12	HC Thurgau	NLB	39	9	14	23	36	—	—	—	—	—
2011–12	Rapperswil-Jona Lakers	NLA	5	0	0	0	0	—	—	—	—	—
2012–13	HC Thurgau	NLB	40	7	14	21	58	—	—	—	—	—
2012–13	EHC Olten	NLB	9	2	1	3	6	9	1	5	6	12
NLA totals			229	7	11	18	138	28	1	0	1	12
NLB totals			346	56	157	213	486	63	10	23	33	119
