= Nikolaus Senn =

Former co-president of Schweizerische Bankgesellschaft, as of today UBS
- In office 1968–1996

Personal details
- Born: 22 October 1926 Herisau, Canton of Appenzell Ausserrhoden
- Died: 2 November 2014 (aged 88) Herrliberg
- Education: University of Freiburg; University of Zürich; University of Lausanne; University of Bern
- Occupation: Jurist, Banker

Nikolaus Senn (22 October 1926 – 2 November 2014) was a Swiss jurist, economist and banker.

== Life ==
Nikolaus Senn studied since 1945 jurisprudence and public administration at the University of Freiburg, University of Zürich, University of Lausanne and University of Bern (promotion in 1950), and finished his education as advocate in 1951 in St. Gallen. In May 1951 Nikolaus Senn started an internship at the former Schweizerische Bankgesellschaft (SBG). From 1961 to 1996 he was a member of the executive board, later member of the directors board of the SBG. After eight years as board member, he retired in 1996 and on 16 April 1996 by the general assembly was given the title honorary president of the UBS.

After his retirement, Senn was a sought-after discussion partner in the media on UBS issues.

== Politics ==
Although he held no political office, Nikolaus Senn was an opponent of Christoph Blocher and forced his deselection from the SBG's board of directors, as well he argued forcefully against a takeover of the majority shareholding by Martin Ebner's BZ group.
