= Wangen-Brüttisellen =

- Municipality
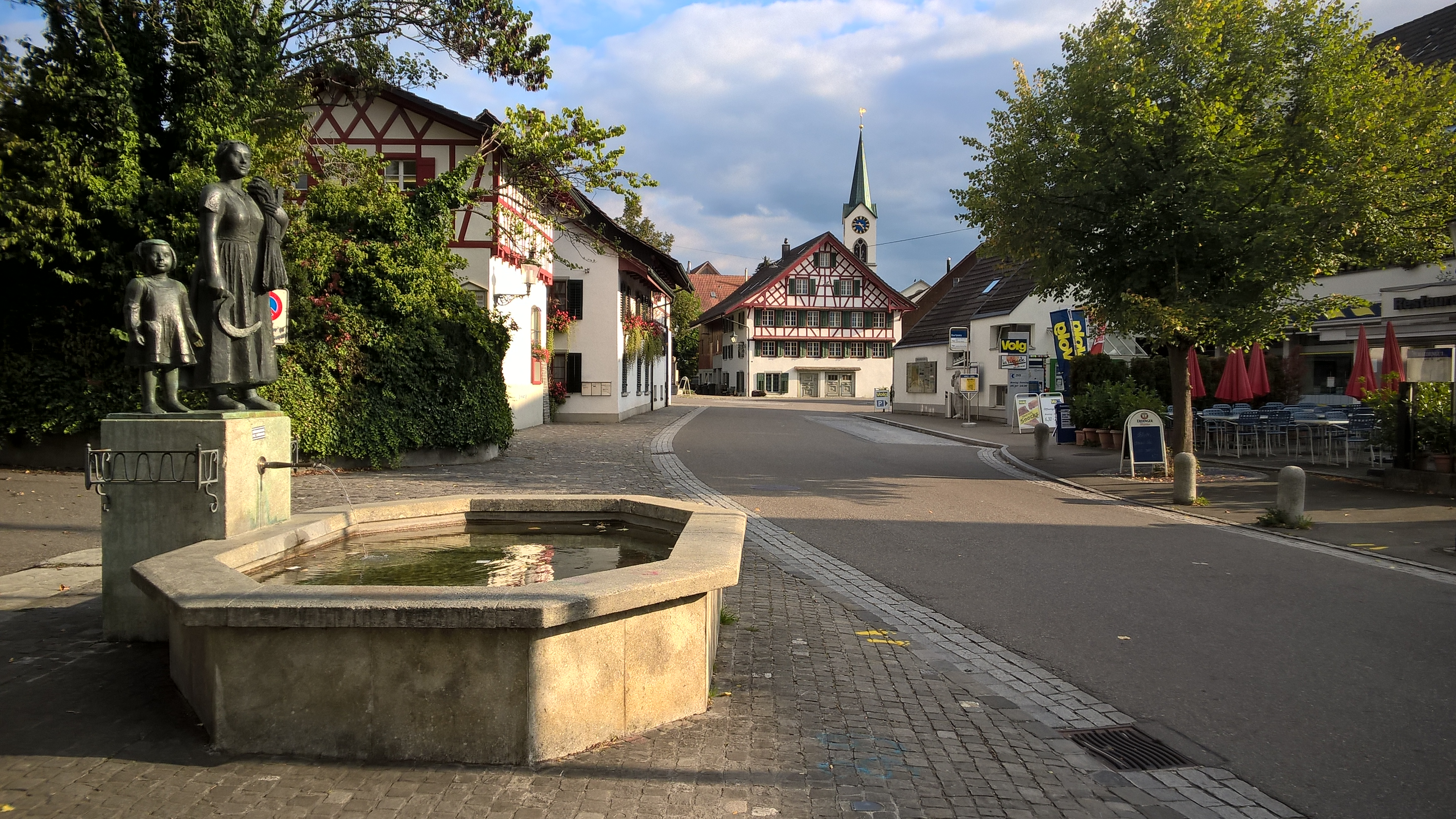
- Town center of Wangen bei Dübendorf, part of Wangen-Brüttisellen

- Flag Coat of arms
- Location of Wangen-Brüttisellen
- Location within Switzerland Location within Canton of Zurich
- Coordinates: 47°25′N 8°39′E
- Country: Switzerland
- Canton: Zurich
- District: Uster

Area
  - Total: 7.90 km^{2} (3.05 sq mi)
- Elevation: 465 m (1,526 ft)

Population (December 2020)
  - Total: 8,000
  - Density: 1,000/km^{2} (2,600/sq mi)
- Time zone: UTC+01:00 (CET)
  - Summer (DST): UTC+02:00 (CEST)
- Postal codes: 8602 Wangen, 8306 Brüttisellen
- SFOS number: 200
- ISO 3166 code: CH-ZH
- Surrounded by: Bassersdorf, Dietlikon, Dübendorf, Lindau, Volketswil
- Website: www.wangen-bruettisellen.ch

Wangen-Brüttisellen is a municipality in the district of Uster in the canton of Zürich in Switzerland, located in the Glatt Valley (German: Glattal).

== History ==
Aerial view from 1000 m by Walter Mittelholzer (1919)

Brüttisellen is first mentioned in 1148 as Britisseldon. In 1242 it was mentioned as Wangen apud Glatto.

Wangen-Brüttisellen now incorporates Wangen bei Dübendorf, which was at one time a separate town.

== Geography ==
Wangen-Brüttisellen has an area of 7.9 km^{2} (3.1 sq mi). Of this area, 46.6% is used for agricultural purposes, while 26.7% is forested. Of the rest of the land, 26.4% is settled (buildings or roads) and the remainder (0.3%) is non-productive (rivers, glaciers or mountains). In 1996 housing and buildings made up 13.3% of the total area, while transportation infrastructure made up the rest (13%). Of the total unproductive area, water (streams and lakes) made up 0.3% of the area. As of 2007 21.6% of the total municipal area was undergoing some type of construction.

== Demographics ==
Wangen-Brüttisellen has a population (as of 31 December 2020) of 8,000. As of 2007, 24.3% of the population was made up of foreign nationals. As of 2008 the gender distribution of the population was 50.5% male and 49.5% female. Over the last 10 years the population has grown at a rate of 30%. Most of the population (as of 2000) speaks German (81.5%), with Italian being second most common (5.3%) and Albanian being third (2.8%).

In the 2007 election the most popular party was the SVP which received 44% of the vote. The next three most popular parties were the SPS (15.3%), the FDP (13.4%) and the CSP (10.2%).

The age distribution of the population (as of 2000) is children and teenagers (0–19 years old) make up 25.8% of the population, while adults (20–64 years old) make up 66.2% and seniors (over 64 years old) make up 8%. In Wangen-Brüttisellen about 74.4% of the population (between age 25-64) have completed either non-mandatory upper secondary education or additional higher education (either university or a Fachhochschule). There are 2498 households in Wangen-Brüttisellen.

Wangen-Brüttisellen has an unemployment rate of 2.88%. As of 2005, there were 84 people employed in the primary economic sector and about 24 businesses involved in this sector. 1,061 people are employed in the secondary sector and there are 86 businesses in this sector. 2,184 people are employed in the tertiary sector, with 242 businesses in this sector. As of 2007 69.2% of the working population were employed full-time, and 30.8% were employed part-time.

As of 2008 there were 2,173 Catholics and 2,397 Protestants in Wangen-Brüttisellen. In the 2000 census, religion was broken down into several smaller categories. From the census, 40.2% were some type of Protestant, with 37.8% belonging to the Swiss Reformed Church and 2.4% belonging to other Protestant churches. 32.7% of the population were Catholic. Of the rest of the population, 10.6% belonged to another religion (not listed), 3.5% did not give a religion, and 12.2% were atheist or agnostic.

=== Timeline ===
Source:

== Economy ==
Skyguide maintains an air traffic control center at Wangen bei Dübendorf.
