= Schwerzenbach =

- Municipality
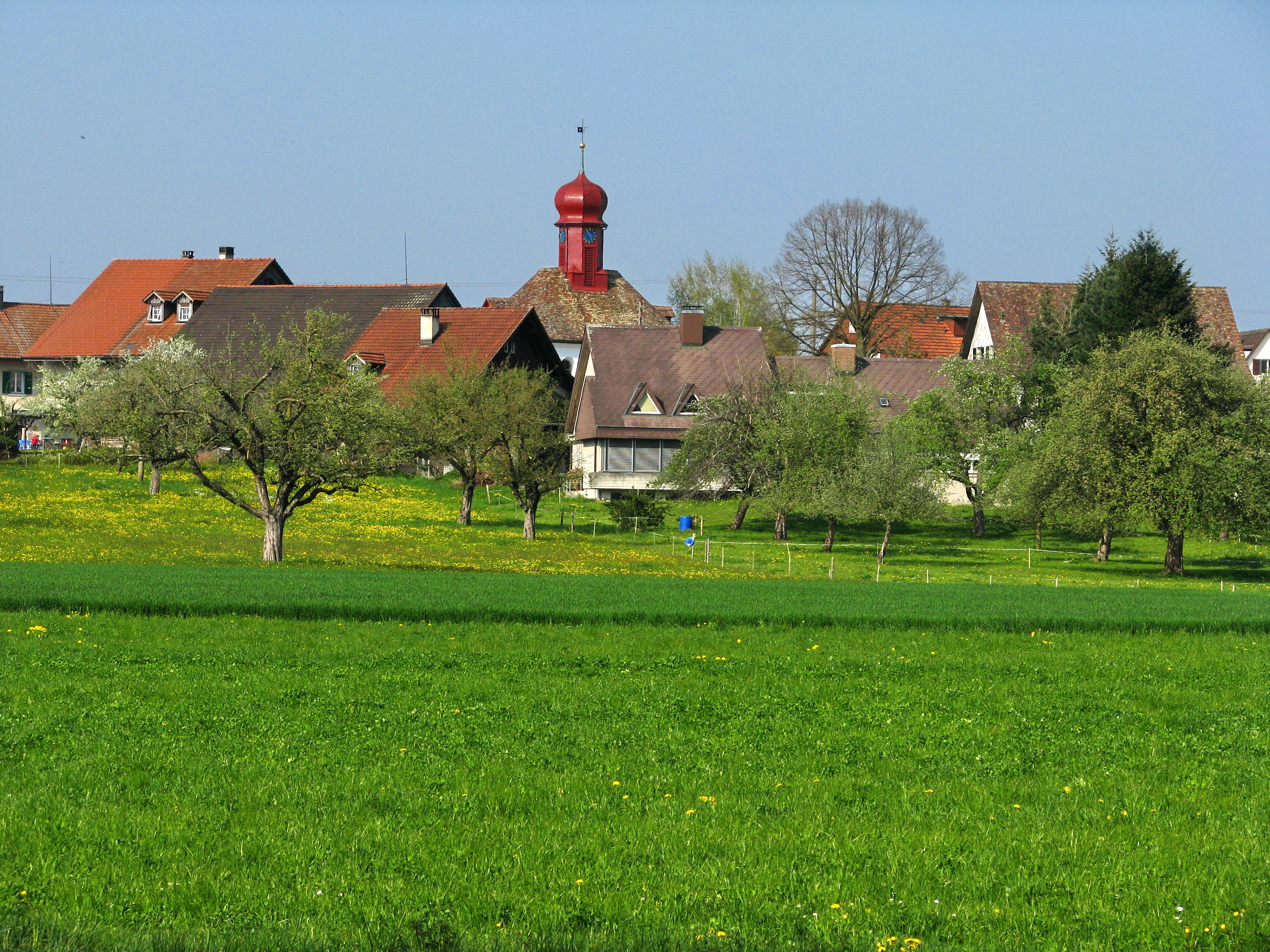

- Flag Coat of arms
- Location of Schwerzenbach
- Location within Switzerland Location within Canton of Zürich
- Coordinates: 47°23′N 8°40′E
- Country: Switzerland
- Canton: Zürich
- District: Uster

Area
  - Total: 2.64 km^{2} (1.02 sq mi)
- Elevation: 443 m (1,453 ft)

Population (December 2020)
  - Total: 5,193
  - Density: 1,970/km^{2} (5,090/sq mi)
- Time zone: UTC+01:00 (CET)
  - Summer (DST): UTC+02:00 (CEST)
- Postal code: 8603
- SFOS number: 197
- ISO 3166 code: CH-ZH
- Surrounded by: Dübendorf, Fällanden, Greifensee, Volketswil
- Twin towns: Aizpute (Latvia)
- Website: www.schwerzenbach.ch

Schwerzenbach is a municipality in the district of Uster in the canton of Zürich in Switzerland, and belongs to the Glatt Valley (German: Glattal).

The municipality was first mentioned in year 1064 as Swerzenbach.

== Geography ==
Schwerzenbach has an area of 2.7 km^{2} (1.0 sq mi). Of this area, 40.8% is used for agricultural purposes, while 6.8% is forested. Of the rest of the land, 38.5% is settled (buildings or roads) and the remainder (14%) is non-productive (rivers, etc.). In 1996 housing and buildings made up 26.9% of the total area, while transportation infrastructure made up the rest (11.7%). Of the total unproductive area, water (streams and lakes) made up 1.1% of the area. As of 2007 39.8% of the total municipal area was undergoing some type of construction.

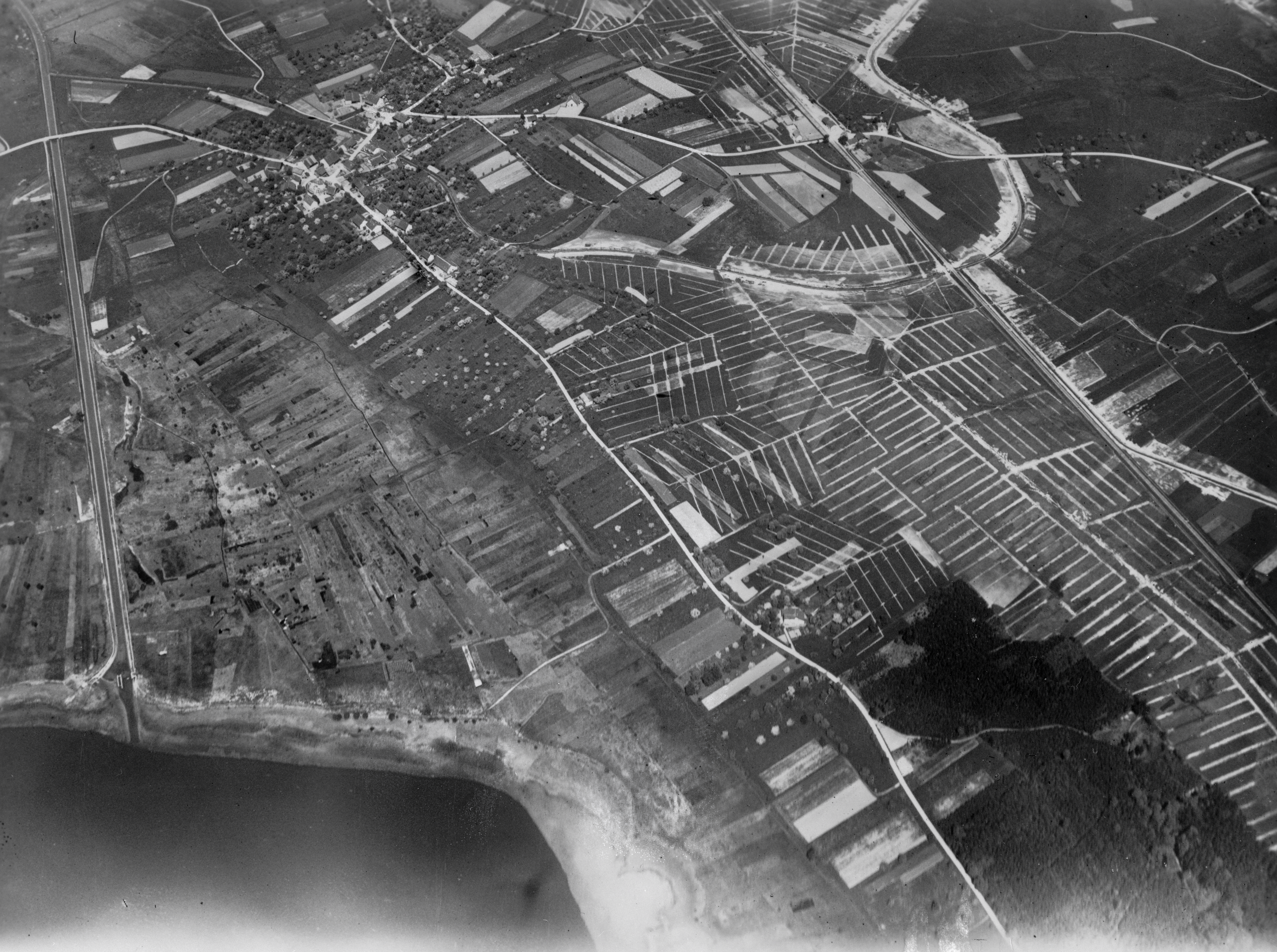
Aerial view from 800 m by Walter Mittelholzer (1920)

== Politics ==
Mayor is Thomas Weber (independent, 2014).

Member of the municipal council (2014–2018)
| Name | Beginning | Task | Party |
|---|---|---|---|
| Thomas Weber | 1994 | Mayor / planning | independent |
| Martina Hubacher | 2010 | Vice-Mayor, society | parteilos |
| Thomas A. Frey | 2010 | finance | FDP |
| Esther Borra-Wegmann | 2014 | high-building / property | independent |
| René Iten | 2004 | underground work / work | FDP |
| Rahel Hofmann-Meyer | 2014 | health | FDP |
| Hansjörg Steiner | 2014 | security | CVP |

== Demographics ==
Schwerzenbach has a population (as of 31 December 2020) of 5,193. As of 2007, 18.4% of the population was made up of foreign nationals. As of 2008 the gender distribution of the population was 49.3% male and 50.7% female. Over the last 10 years the population has grown at a rate of 6.5%. Most of the population (as of 2000) speaks German (84.8%), with Italian being second most common (3.6%) and Albanian being third (2.0%).

Historic population is described by the following graph:

In the 2007 election the most popular party was the SVP which received 34.4% of the vote. The next three most popular parties were the SPS (17.5%), the CSP (15.4%) and the FDP (13.2%).

The age distribution of the population (as of 2000) is children and teenagers (0 to 19 years old) make up 23.8% of the population, while adults (20 to 64 years old) make up 66.2% and seniors (over 64 years old) make up 10%. In Schwerzenbach about 79.7% of the population (between age 25 and 64) have completed either non-mandatory upper secondary education or additional higher education (either university or a Fachhochschule). There are 1890 households in Schwerzenbach.

Schwerzenbach has an unemployment rate of 2.57%. As of 2005, there were 86 people employed in the primary economic sector and about 11 businesses involved in this sector. 1083 people are employed in the secondary sector and there are 41 businesses in this sector. 2011 people are employed in the tertiary sector, with 188 businesses in this sector. As of 2007 90.9% of the working population were employed full-time, and 9.1% were employed part-time.

As of 2008 there were 1272 Catholics and 1645 Protestants in Schwerzenbach. In the 2000 census, religion was broken down into several smaller categories. From the census, 44.1% were some type of Protestant, with 41.1% belonging to the Swiss Reformed Church and 2.9% belonging to other Protestant churches. 32% of the population were Catholic. Of the rest of the population, 0% were Muslim, 8% belonged to another religion (not listed), 2.6% did not give a religion, and 12.5% were atheist or agnostic.

== Transportation ==
Schwerzenbach railway station is a stop of the Zürich S-Bahn on the lines S9 and S14. It is a 14-minute (S9) ride from Zürich Hauptbahnhof.

== International relations ==
=== Twin towns – Sister cities ===
Schwerzenbach is twinned with:

- Aizpute, Latvia
