= Herrliberg =

- Municipality
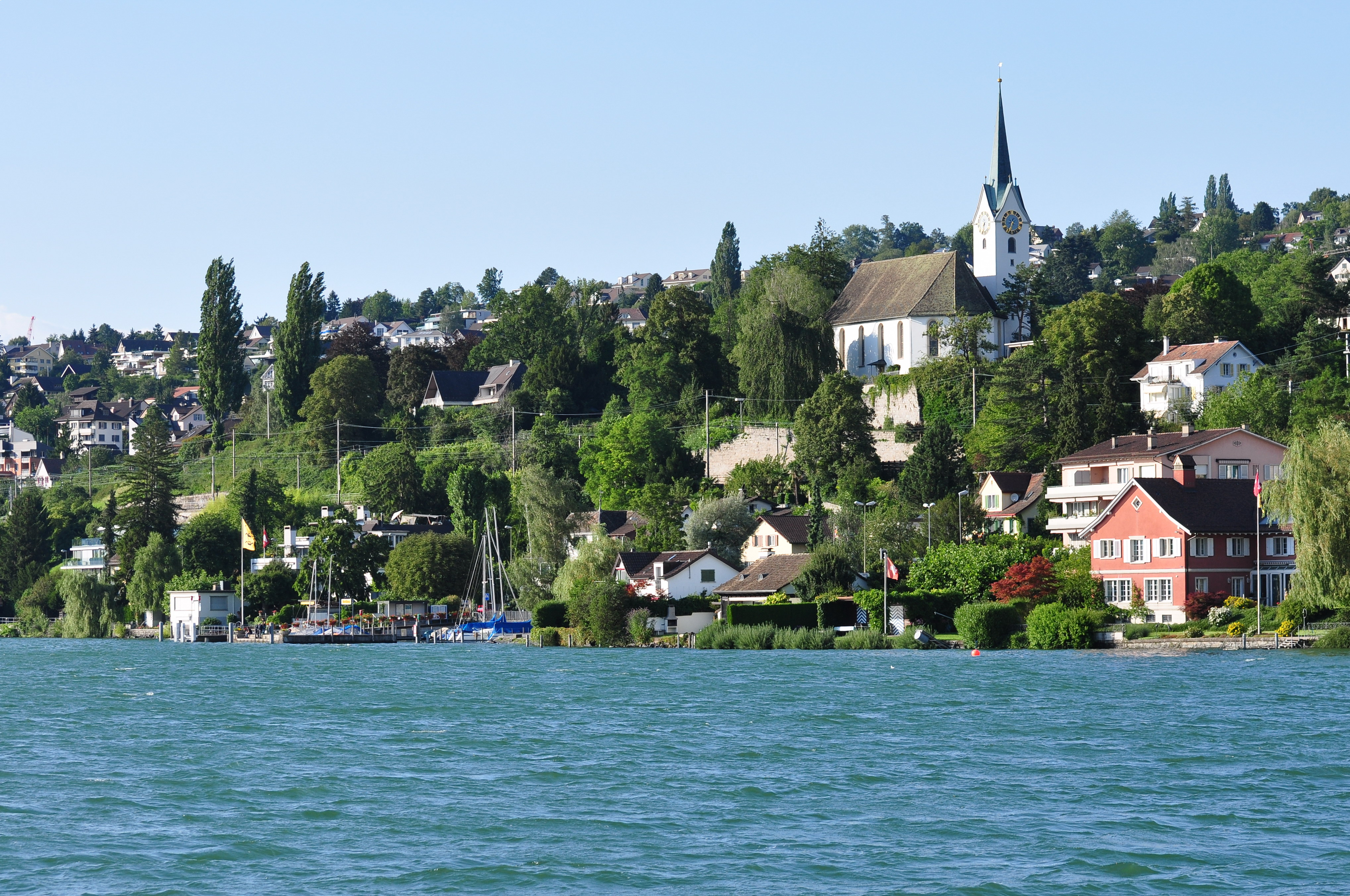

- Flag Coat of arms
- Location of Herrliberg
- Location within Switzerland Location within Canton of Zurich
- Coordinates: 47°17′N 8°37′E
- Country: Switzerland
- Canton: Zurich
- District: Meilen

Area
  - Total: 8.97 km^{2} (3.46 sq mi)
- Elevation: 464 m (1,522 ft)

Population (December 2020)
  - Total: 6,567
  - Density: 732/km^{2} (1,900/sq mi)
- Time zone: UTC+01:00 (CET)
  - Summer (DST): UTC+02:00 (CEST)
- Postal code: 8704
- SFOS number: 152
- ISO 3166 code: CH-ZH
- Surrounded by: Egg, Erlenbach, Küsnacht, Maur, Meilen, Oberrieden, Thalwil
- Website: www.herrliberg.ch

Herrliberg is a municipality in the district of Meilen in the canton of Zürich in Switzerland.

== History ==
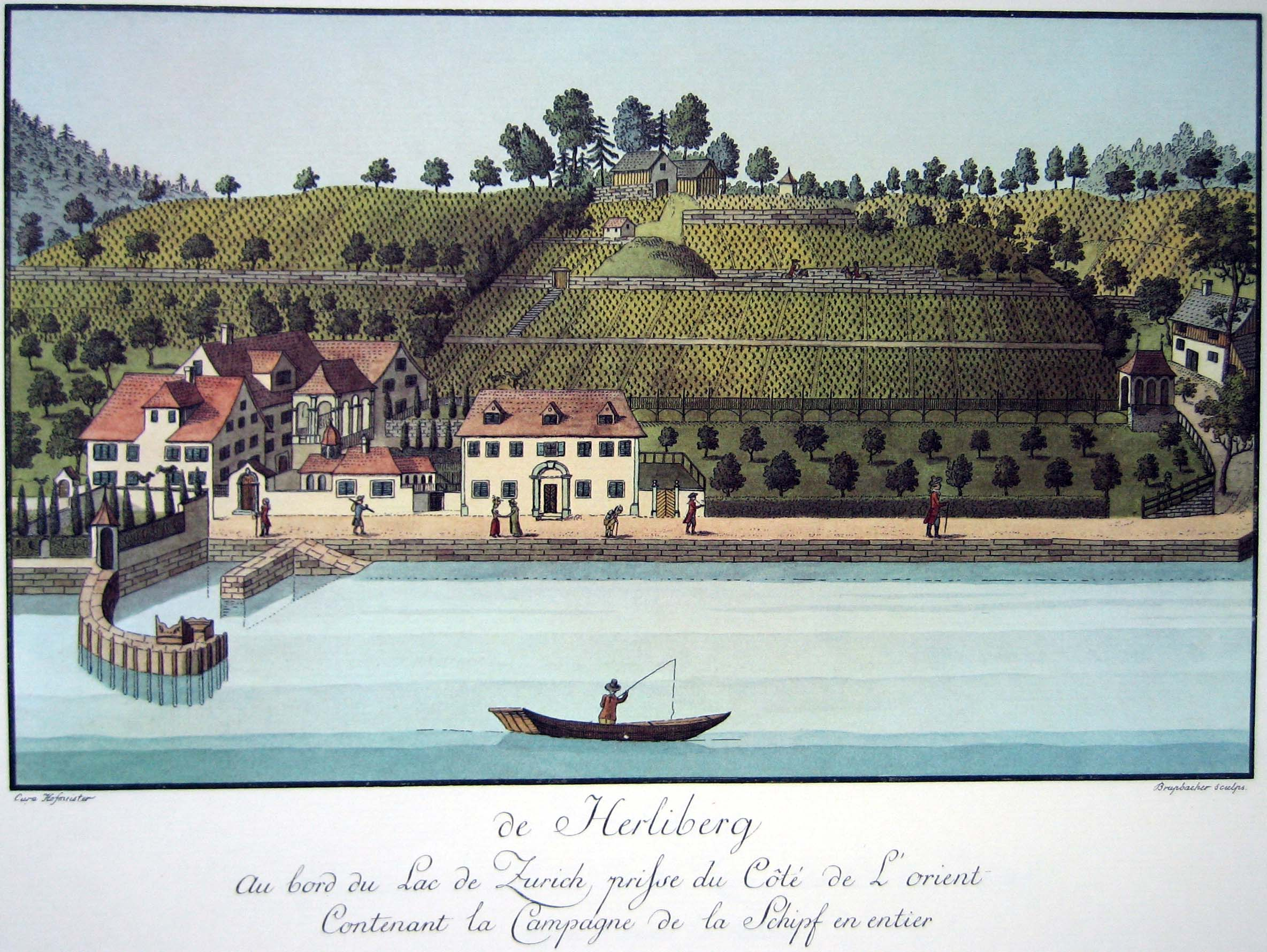
Postcard from 1794 showing the vineyards above Herrliberg

Aerial view from 150 m by Walter Mittelholzer (1919)

There are findings dating back to the Bronze Age.

In the 8th century, a village called Tächliswil was established. A hamlet called Wezzo (today Wetzwil) was donated to the St. Gallen Abbey in 797. There are also a number of other hamlets, including Breitwil, Kittenmühle and Intwil.

Herrliberg is first mentioned in 1153–1155 as Hardiperc. In 1273 it was mentioned as Herdiperch and in the mid-15th Century as Härliberg.

Wine growing was important for centuries. In the Middle Ages, most of the land belonged to the churches of Zürich (Grossmünster and Fraumünster), but in 1412 Herrliberg was established as the place of a reeve. This made Herrliberg associated with Zürich. Since 1815, the municipality is part of the district of Meilen.

The chapel in Wetzwil predates 1370. The first school was opened in 1639. Thereafter, in 1687, the local parish church was built.

In 1886, the peak of wine growing, Herrliberg counted 174 wine growers, tending 1.3 km^{2} (0.50 sq mi) of vineyards.

With the opening of the railway link to Zürich in 1896, Herrliberg started to develop as part of the suburbs of Zürich.

== Geography ==
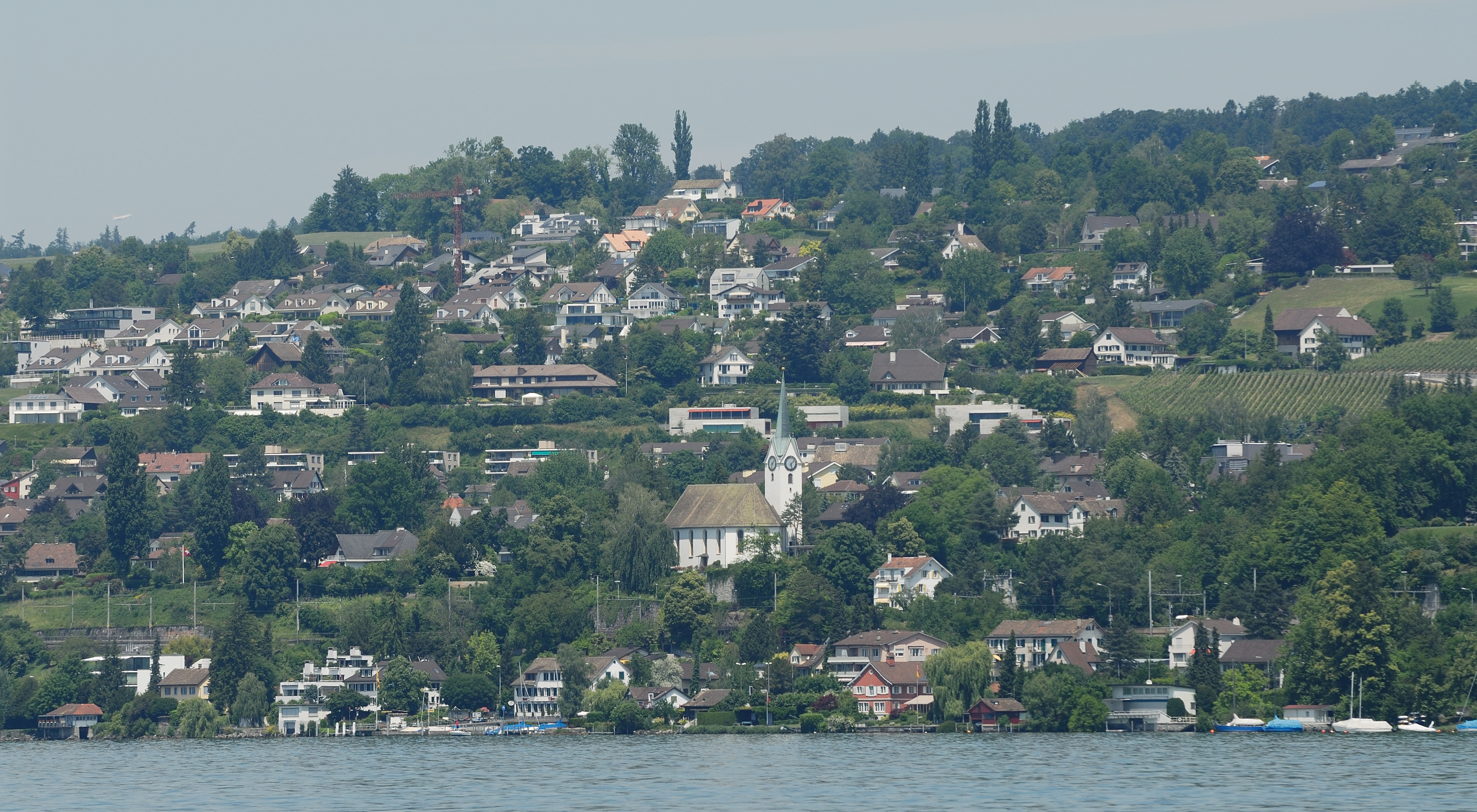
Herrliberg from across Lake Zurich

Herrliberg has an area of 9 km^{2} (3.5 sq mi). Of this area, 56.5% is used for agricultural purposes, while 24.2% is forested. Of the rest of the land, 19.2% is settled (buildings or roads) and the remainder (0.1%) is non-productive (rivers, glaciers or mountains). In 1996 housing and buildings made up 15.1% of the total area, while transportation infrastructure made up the rest (4.2%). Of the total unproductive area, water (streams and lakes) made up 0.1% of the area. As of 2007 18.2% of the total municipal area was undergoing some type of construction.

It is located on the north bank of the Lake Zürich in the Pfannenstiel region. In the local dialect it is called Herrlibärg.

The distance from the main square to Zürich Hauptbahnhof is 12 kilometers (7.5 mi). The locality is placed on five tiers.

The municipality is composed of three separate settlements along Lake Zurich, a settlement along the shore, the double village on the terraced slopes and the settlement on the top of the hill. It also includes the hamlets of Wetzwil, Breitwil (today known as Kittenmühle) and scattered farm houses.

== Demographics ==
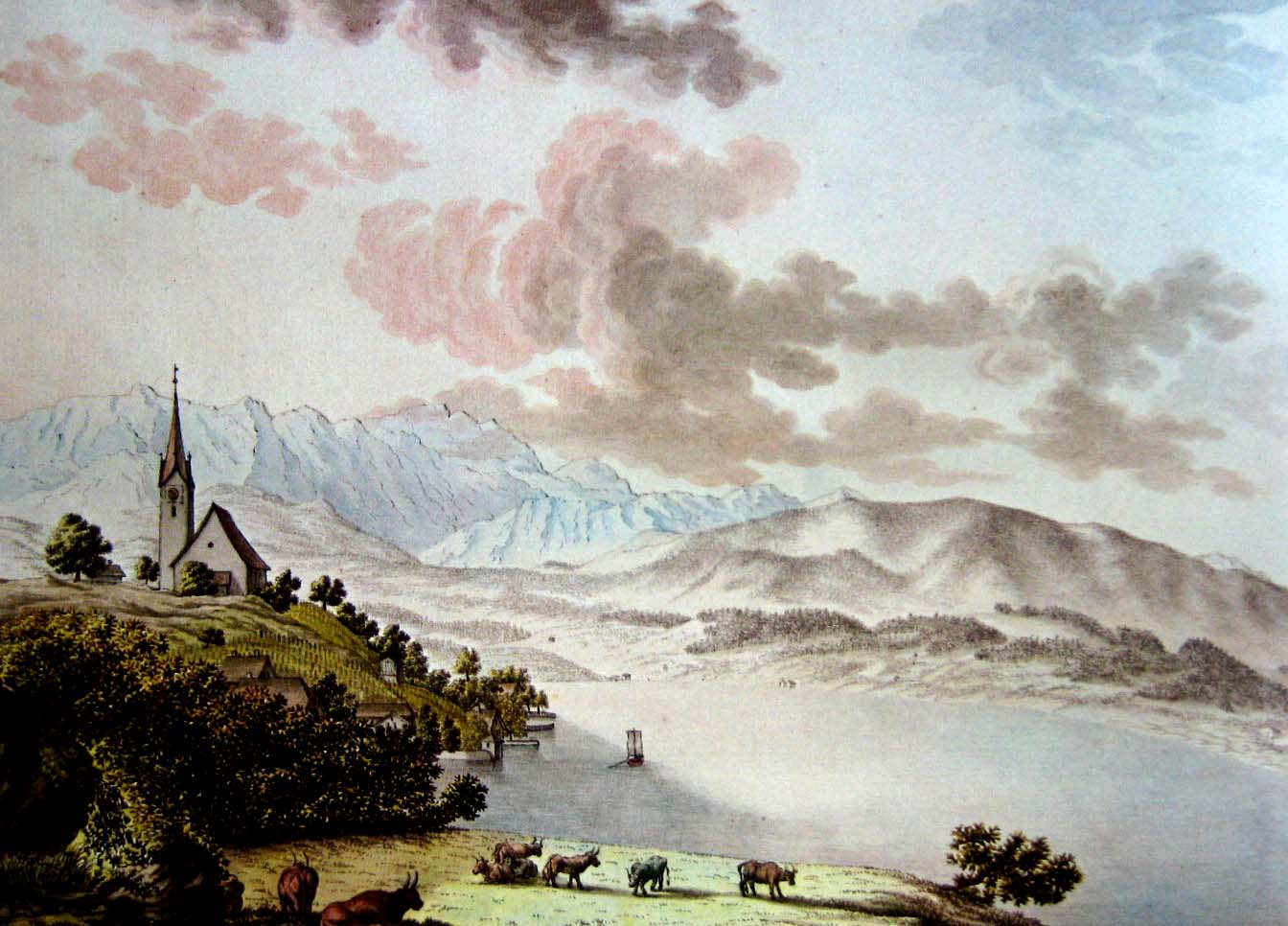
Herrliberg on 21 May 1786, watercolor by Hans C. Escher of the Linth

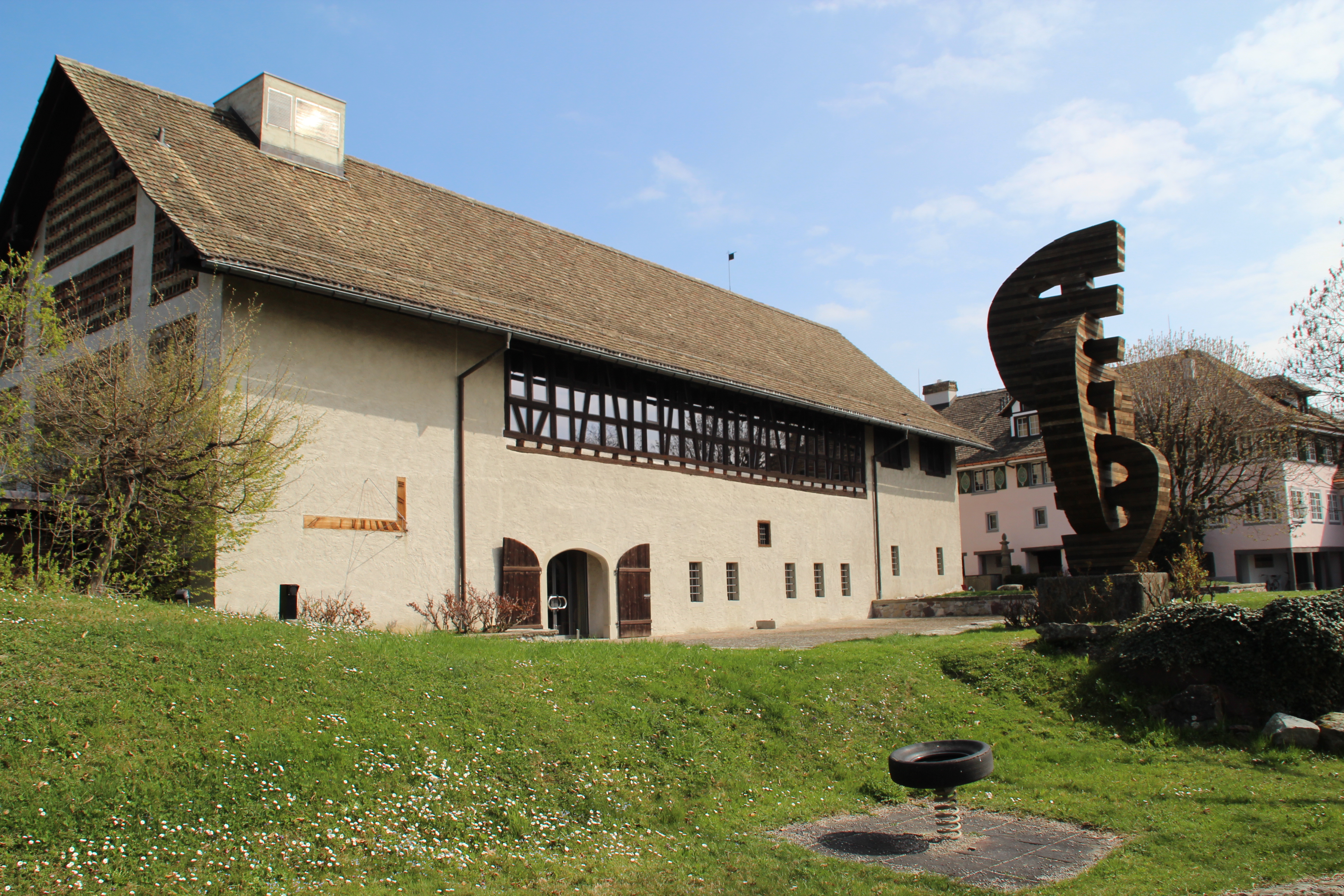

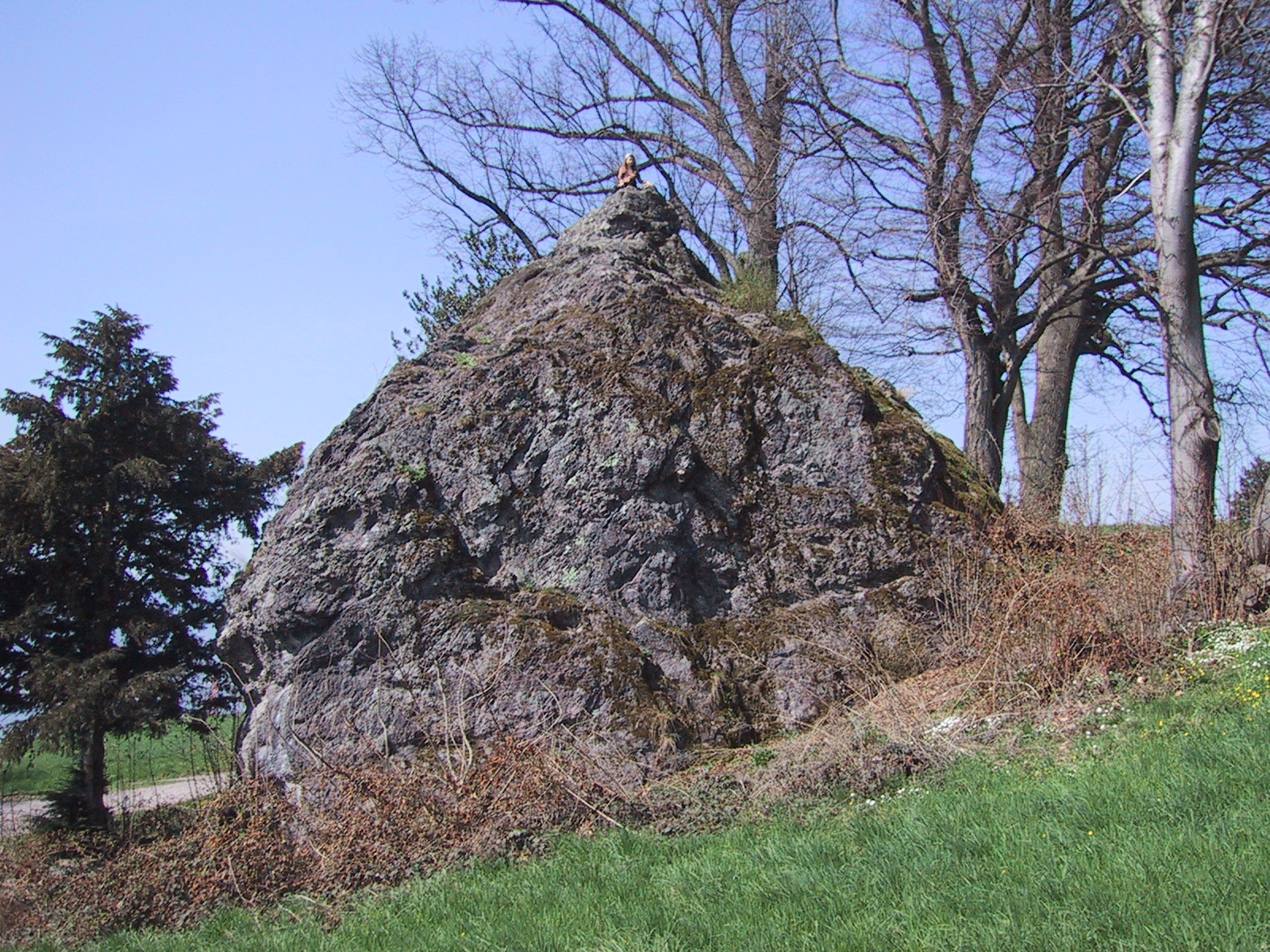

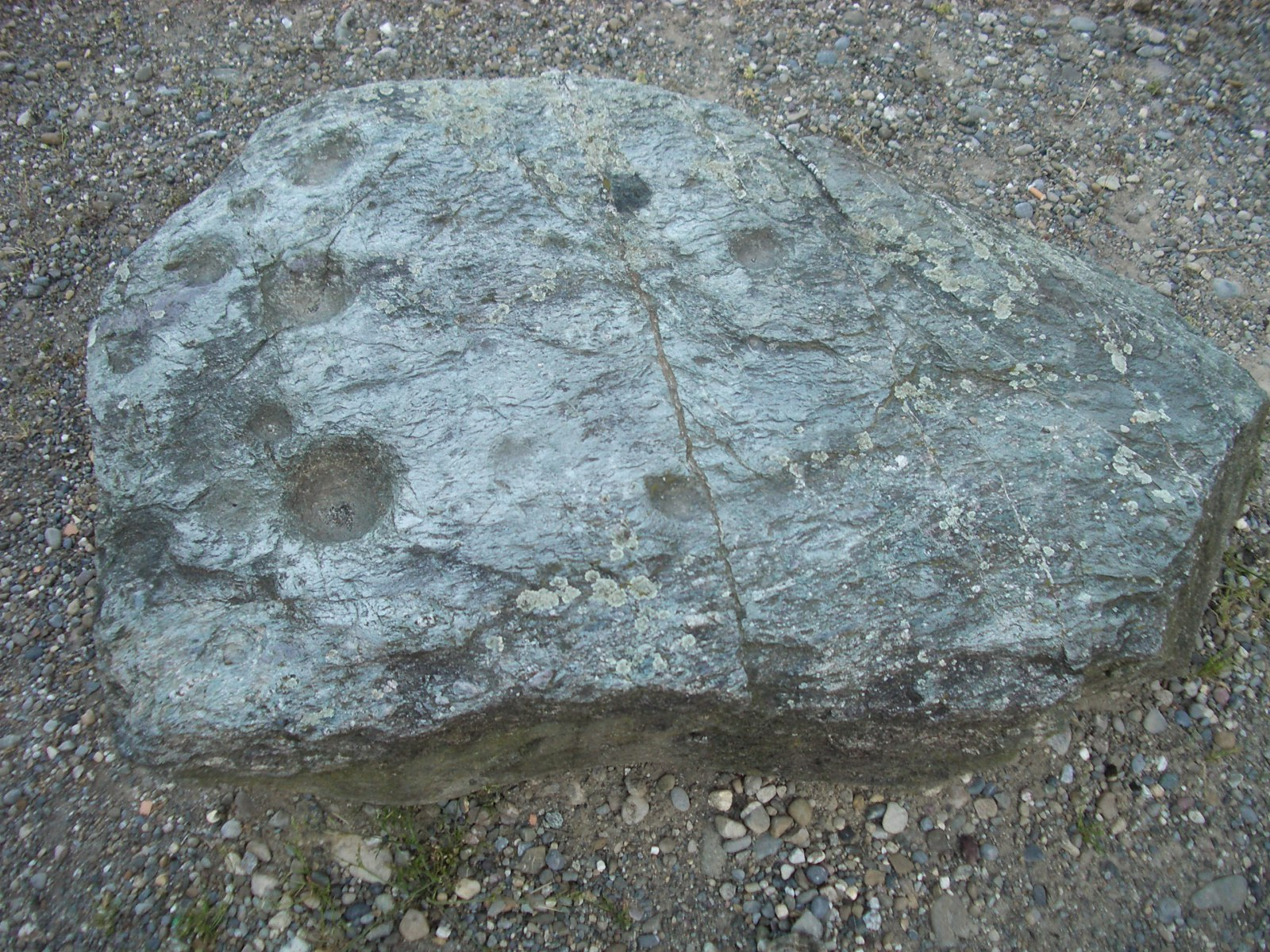
The "cup marks" of the Nordic Bronze Age

Herrliberg has a population (as of 31 December 2023) of 6'753. and 24.1% of the population was made up of foreign nationals. As of 2008 the gender distribution of the population was 48.5% male and 51.5% female. Over the last 10 years the population has grown at a rate of 13.8%. Most of the population (as of 2000) speaks German (89.2%), with English being second most common ( 2.9%) and French being third ( 2.2%).

In the 2007 election the most popular party was the SVP which received 41% of the vote. The next three most popular parties were the FDP (26.5%), the SPS (10%) and the CSP (8.8%).

The age distribution of the population (as of 2000) is children and teenagers (0–19 years old) make up 21.4% of the population, while adults (20–64 years old) make up 62.6% and seniors (over 64 years old) make up 16%. The entire Swiss population is generally well educated. In Herrliberg about 88.5% of the population (between age 25–64) have completed either non-mandatory upper secondary education or additional higher education (either university or a Fachhochschule). There are 2422 households in Herrliberg.

Herrliberg has an unemployment rate of 1.48%. As of 2005, there were 94 people employed in the primary economic sector and about 25 businesses involved in this sector. 122 people are employed in the secondary sector and there are 29 businesses in this sector. 785 people are employed in the tertiary sector, with 194 businesses in this sector. As of 2007 55.6% of the working population were employed full-time, and 44.4% were employed part-time.

As of 2008 there were 1571 Catholics and 2564 Protestants in Herrliberg. In the 2000 census, religion was broken down into several smaller categories. From the census, 52.3% were some type of Protestant, with 50.8% belonging to the Swiss Reformed Church and 1.5% belonging to other Protestant churches. 26.6% of the population were Catholic. Of the rest of the population, 0% were Muslim, 3.7% belonged to another religion (not listed), 2.6% did not give a religion, and 14.5% were atheist or agnostic.

The historical population is given in the following table:

year	population
1467	42 Households
1634	516
1760	979
1850	1,144
1888	964
1900	985
1950	2,298
2000	5,499

== Sights ==
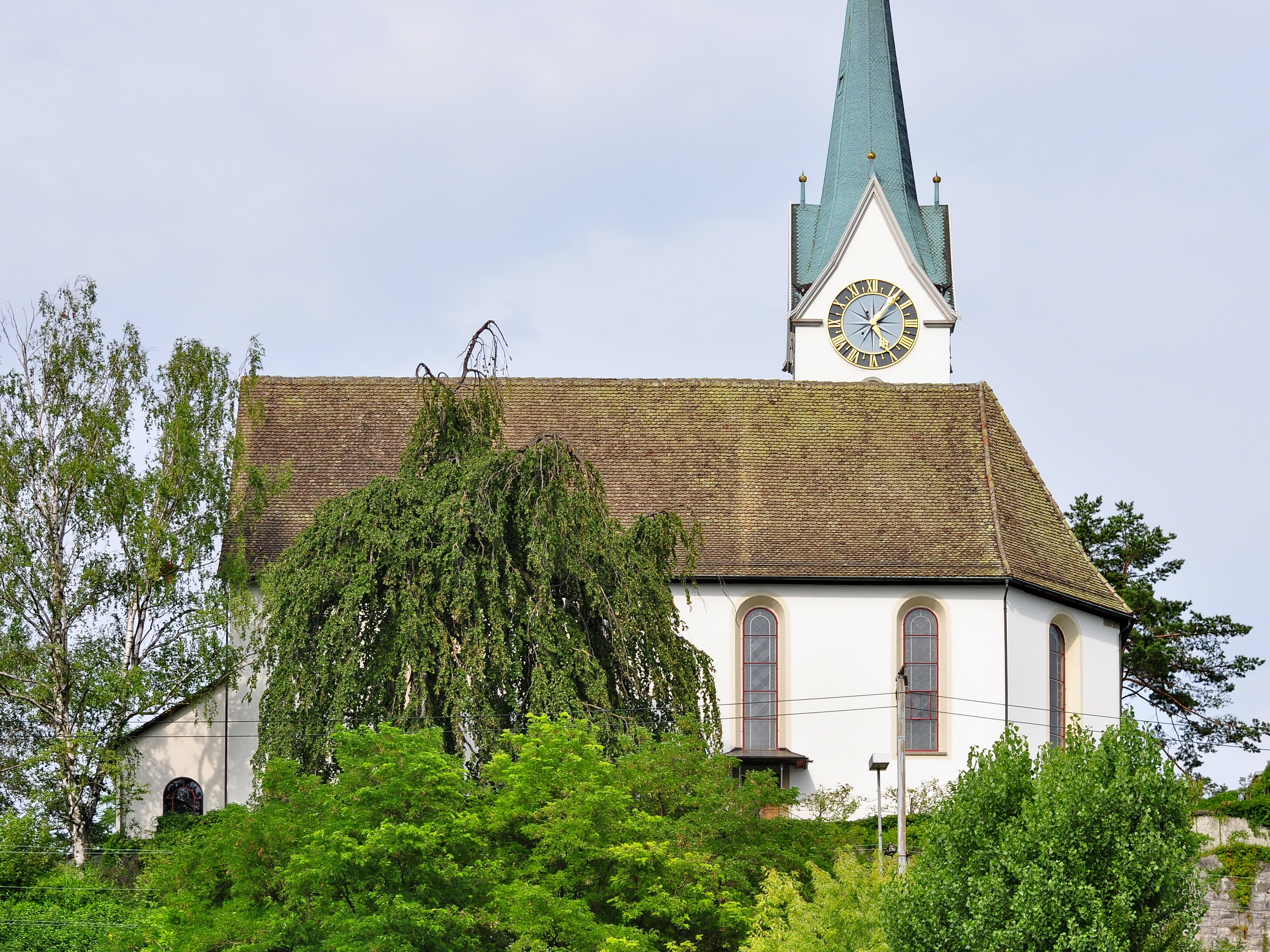
Herrliberg church (2009)

There are three churches in Herrliberg. The Protestant churches can be found in Wetzwil and Tal. The Catholic Church St. Marien is remarkable as it was built recently. The architecture is distinctive.

== Transportation ==
Herrliberg-Feldmeilen railway station is a stop of the S-Bahn Zürich on the line S6 and the terminal station of line S16.

In the summer there are regular boats to Zurich as well as along the lake to Rapperswil, run by the Zürichsee-Schifffahrtsgesellschaft (ZSG).

== Famous people ==
Herrliberg is the home of Christoph Blocher, a Swiss politician, industrialist, and former member of the Swiss Federal Council. It is also the home of Jürg Marquard, a Swiss publisher.

Famous organist, harpsichordist, conductor and Bach interpreter Karl Richter resided in Wetzwil, when not working in Munich with his Münchener Bachchor und Bachorchester.

Willem Sandberg, the Dutch typographer served an apprenticeship to a printer here.

In December 2011, tennis player Roger Federer and his wife Mirka purchased a 1.4 acre (5779 sq meters) development lot in the Laubhölzli area of Herrliberg, leading to speculation that they intend to build a home there. They sold the lot in 2024 without having developed it.

On 2 November 2014 Nikolaus Senn, the former co-director of Schweizerische Bankgesellschaft, died in Herrliberg.
