= Meilen District =

Coordinates: 47°16′N 8°40′E

Meilen District Bezirk Meilen
- District
- Flag Coat of arms
- Country: Switzerland
- Canton: Zürich
- Capital: Meilen

Area
  - Total: 84.64 km^{2} (32.68 sq mi)

Population (31 December 2020)
  - Total: 106,506
  - Density: 1,258/km^{2} (3,259/sq mi)
- Time zone: UTC+1 (CET)
  - Summer (DST): UTC+2 (CEST)
- Municipalities: 11

Meilen District is one of the twelve districts of the German-speaking canton of Zurich, Switzerland. It lies to the south of the canton in the Pfannenstiel region, forming much of the northern shore of Lake Zurich. The district capital is the town of Meilen.

== Municipalities ==
Meilen contains a total of eleven municipalities:

Municipality	Population (31 December 2020)	Area, km^{2}
Erlenbach	5,606	2.97
Herrliberg	6,567	8.97
Hombrechtikon	8,815	12.19
Küsnacht	14,811	12.35
Männedorf	11,397	4.78
Meilen	14,539	11.93
Oetwil am See	4,857	6.09
Stäfa	14,791	8.59
Uetikon am See	6,225	3.49
Zollikon	13,311	7.84
Zumikon	5,587	5.44
Total	106,506	84.64
