= Erlenbach, Switzerland =

Erlenbach
- Municipality
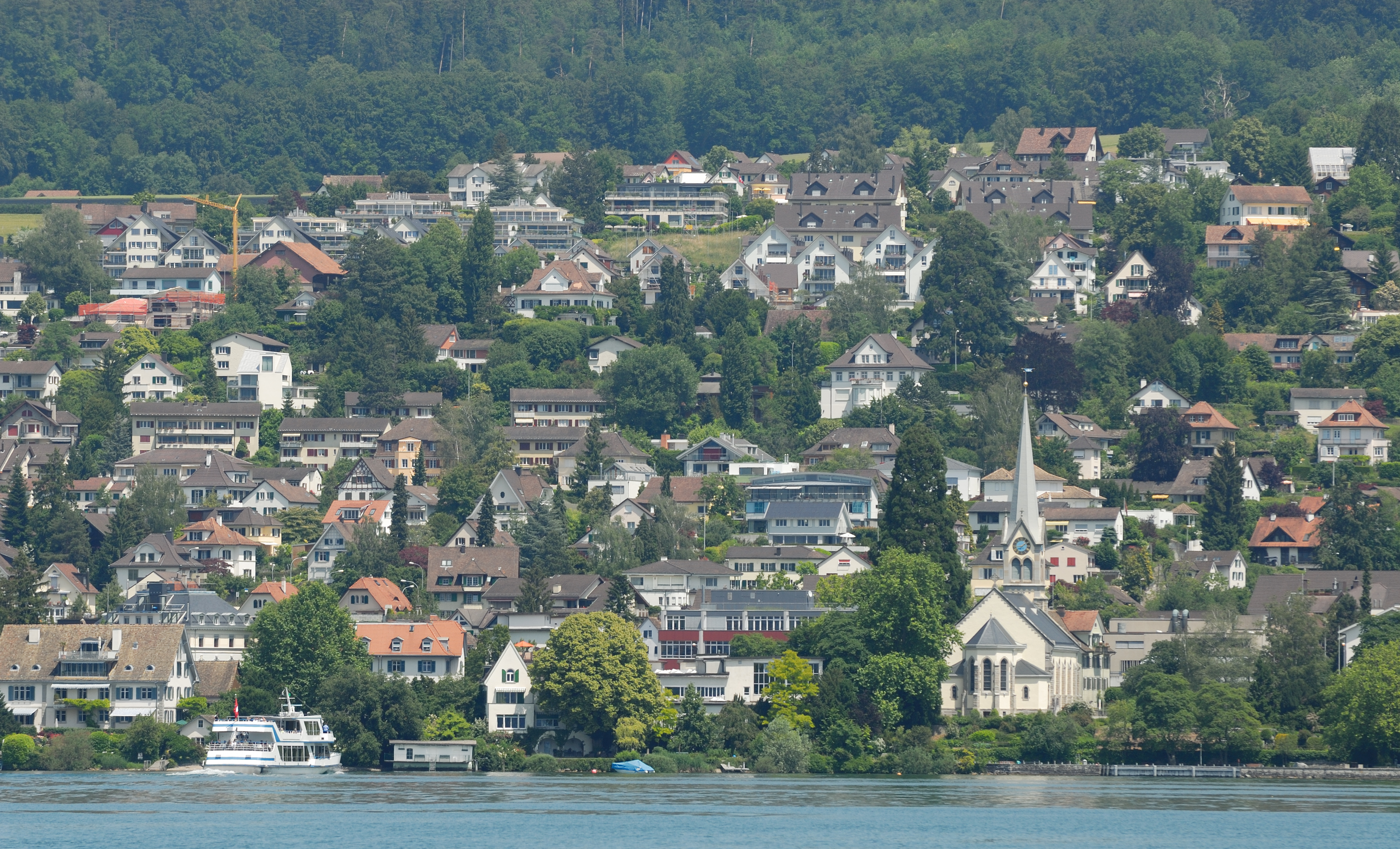

- Flag Coat of arms
- Location of Erlenbach
- Location within Switzerland Location within Canton of Zurich
- Coordinates: 47°18′N 8°35′E
- Country: Switzerland
- Canton: Zurich
- District: Meilen

Area
  - Total: 2.97 km^{2} (1.15 sq mi)
- Elevation: 412 m (1,352 ft)

Population (December 2020)
  - Total: 5,606
  - Density: 1,890/km^{2} (4,890/sq mi)
- Time zone: UTC+01:00 (CET)
  - Summer (DST): UTC+02:00 (CEST)
- Postal code: 8703
- SFOS number: 151
- ISO 3166 code: CH-ZH
- Surrounded by: Herrliberg, Küsnacht, Thalwil
- Twin towns: Erlenbach im Simmental (Switzerland), Erlenbach am Main (Germany)
- Website: www.erlenbach.ch

Erlenbach (Swiss Standard German pronunciation: [ˈɛrlənbax]) is a municipality in the district of Meilen in the canton of Zürich in Switzerland.

== History ==
Erlenbach is first mentioned in 981 as Liber Heremi though this identification is questionable. Between 1173-90 it was mentioned as Erlibach.

Archeological digs have shown that there were settlements in Erlenbach more than 5,000 years ago. During Roman times an important road passed through what is now Erlenbach. The Alemanni settled in this village in the 6th century. In 981 the name Erlibach was first mentioned when the monastery of Einsiedeln acquired the land. Around 1400 the city of Zürich bought the land. Two castles Balp and Dachsberg are mentioned in old writings, but there is no evidence left.

Aerial view by Walter Mittelholzer (1923)

On 6 October 1445 a small battle (Schlacht bey Ehrlibach) took place in Erlenbach. Troops from Zürich defeated wine thieves. In 1798 the village housed in turn French, Austrian, Russian, and eventually again French troops.

Until the middle of the 19th century, Erlenbach remained a small village with less than 1000 inhabitants, mainly engaged in wine growing. In 1835 the first school was built, but it had just two classrooms.

After World War II the village was very sought after and the population grew dramatically.

== Geography ==
Erlenbach has an area of 3 km^{2} (1.2 sq mi). It is located on the north bank of the lake of Zürich, opposite Thalwil, on the Erlen stream (Erlen Bach) and along the Zürich-Rapperswil road. As well as the village, there are the outlying sections of Wyden, Winkel, Isler, Bindschädler and Lerchenberg.

Land use in Erlenbach in 1996
Agriculture	25.7%		
Forest	26.7%		
Buildings and roads	47%	Buildings	37%
Buildings and roads	47%	Transportation infrastructure	10.1%
Rivers, glaciers, mountains	0.7%	Streams and lakes	0.3%

As of 2007 46.3% of the total municipal area was undergoing some type of construction.

== Demographics ==
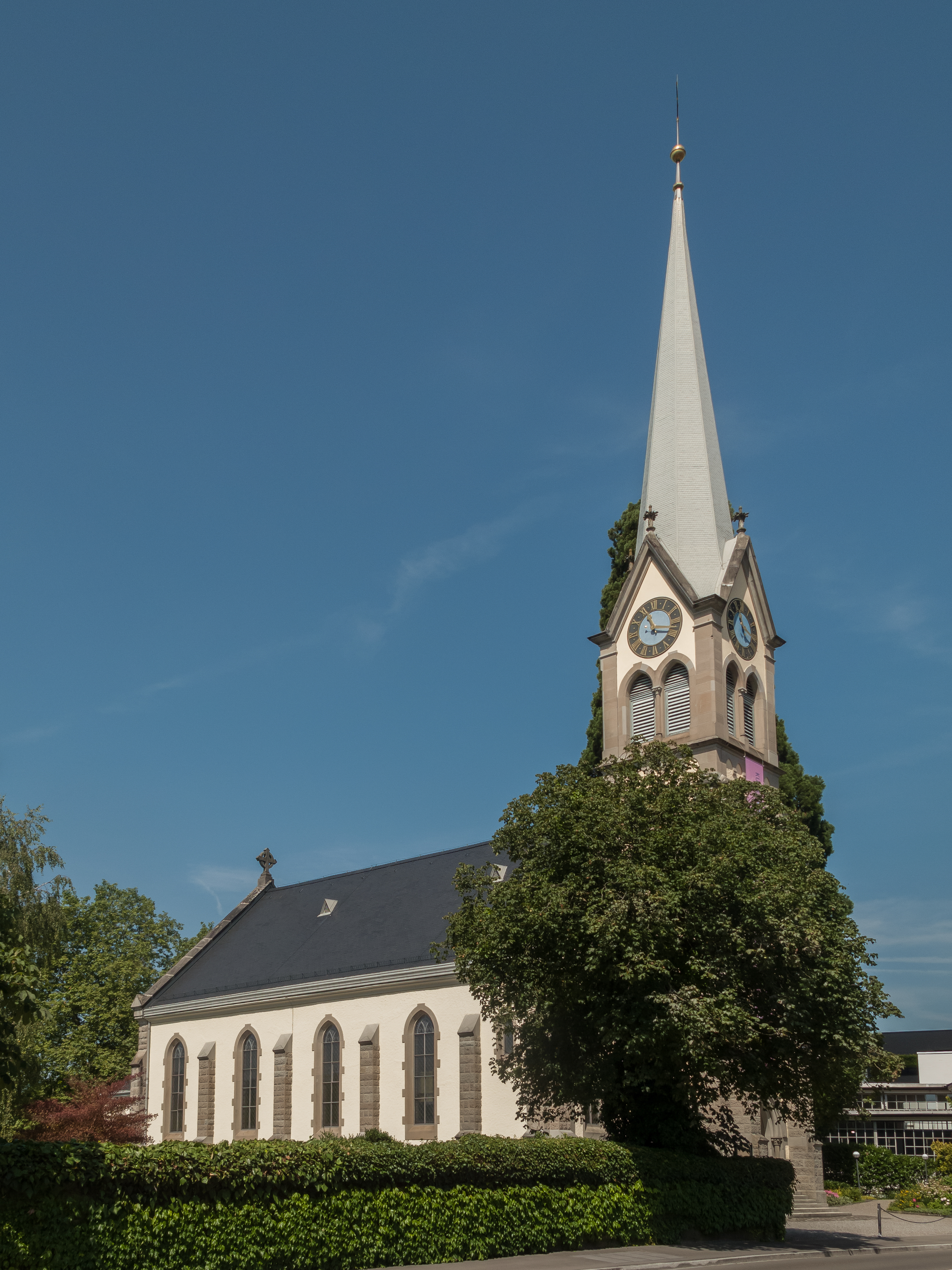
Erlenbach, reformed church

Erlenbach has a population (as of 31 December 2020) of 5,606. As of 2007, 17.1% of the population was made up of foreign nationals. As of 2008 the gender distribution of the population was 47.8% male and 52.2% female. Over the last 10 years the population has grown at a rate of 19.5%. Most of the population (as of 2000) speaks German (86.3%), with English being second most common ( 2.8%) and Italian being third ( 2.7%).

In the 2007 election the most popular party was the FDP which received 30.2% of the vote. The next three most popular parties were the SVP (27.9%), the SPS (16.1%) and the CSP (10.1%).

The age distribution of the population (as of 2000) is children and teenagers (0–19 years old) make up 20.4% of the population, while adults (20–64 years old) make up 62.2% and seniors (over 64 years old) make up 17.4%. About 82.3% of the population (between age 25-64) have completed either non-mandatory upper secondary education or additional higher education (either university or a Fachhochschule). There are 2041 households in Erlenbach.

Erlenbach has an unemployment rate of 1.59%. As of 2005, there were 60 people employed in the primary economic sector and about 10 businesses involved in this sector. 204 people are employed in the secondary sector and there are 33 businesses in this sector. 1131 people are employed in the tertiary sector, with 227 businesses in this sector. As of 2007 50% of the working population were employed full-time, and 50% were employed part-time.

As of 2008 there were 1419 Catholics and 2146 Protestants in Erlenbach. In the 2000 census, religion was broken down into several smaller categories. From the census, 47% were some type of Protestant, with 45.9% belonging to the Swiss Reformed Church and 1.1% belonging to other Protestant churches. 29.2% of the population were Catholic. Of the rest of the population, 0% were Muslim, 5.4% belonged to another religion (not listed), 2.4% did not give a religion, and 15.7% were atheist or agnostic.

Historical population
Year	Population
1400	c. 200
1764	682
1850	978
1888	944
1900	1,207
1910	1,510
1950	3,448
1970	4,523
1990	4,377
2000	4,609

== Transportation ==
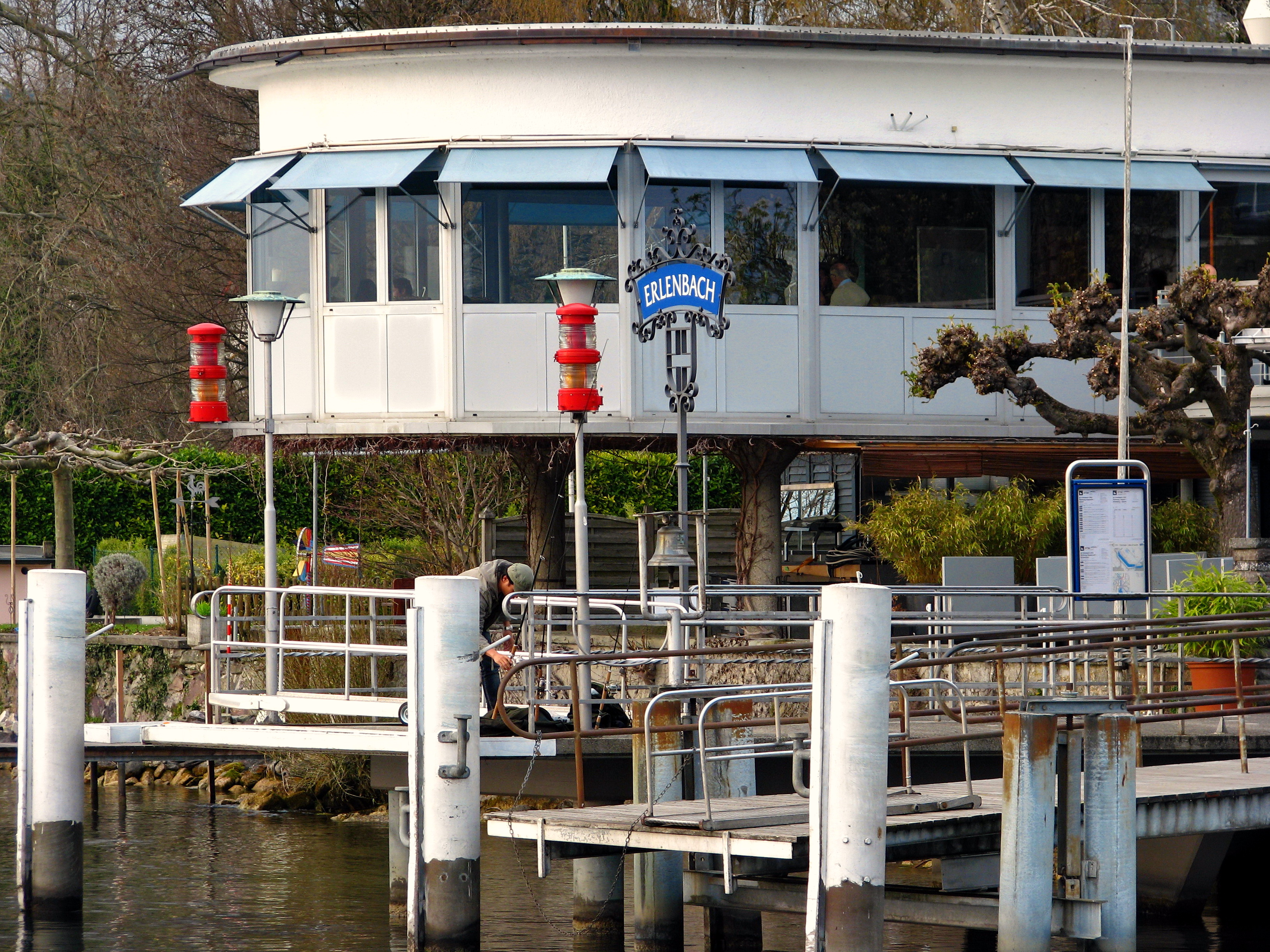
ZSG landing gate on Lake Zurich's shore

The development of a railway link between Zürich and Rapperswil had a great impact on the village. Bit by bit the village turned from an agricultural village to part of Zürich's agglomeration. There are two stations within the municipality, Erlenbach ZH station and Winkel am Zürichsee station. Both are stops of the S-Bahn Zürich on the lines S6 and S16. Tourist boat trips, run by the Zürichsee-Schifffahrtsgesellschaft, also sail from Zürich and Rapperswil.

== Cultural heritage ==
Located on Zürichsee lakeshore, Erlenbach–Winkel is part of the 56 Swiss sites of the UNESCO World Heritage Site Prehistoric pile dwellings around the Alps, and the settlement is also listed in the Swiss inventory of cultural property of national and regional significance as a Class object. Because the lake has grown in size over time, the original piles are now around 4 metres (13 ft) to 7 metres (23 ft) under the water level of 406 metres (1,332 ft).
