= Maur, Switzerland =

Maur
- Municipality
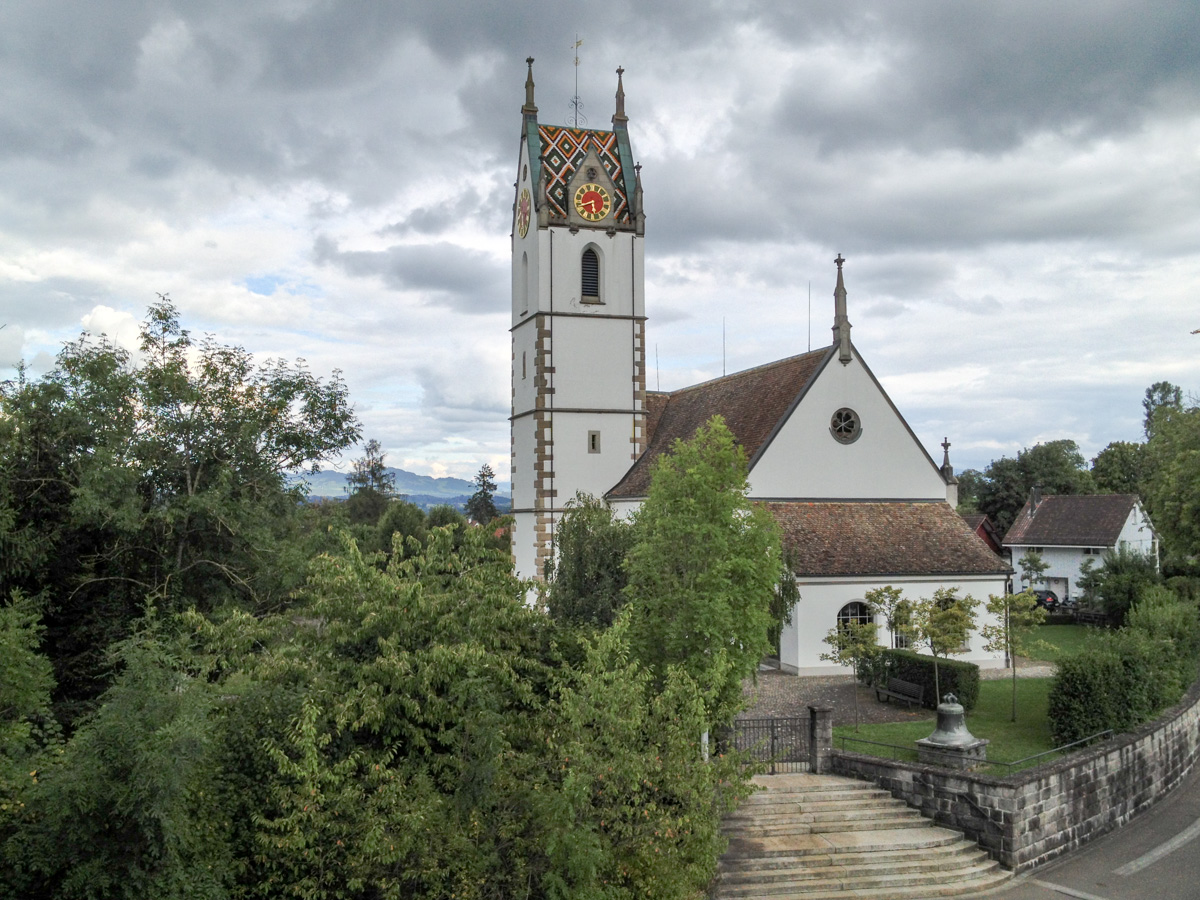

- Flag Coat of arms
- Location of Maur
- Location within Switzerland Location within Canton of Zurich
- Coordinates: 47°21′N 8°40′E
- Country: Switzerland
- Canton: Zurich
- District: Uster

Area
  - Total: 14.80 km^{2} (5.71 sq mi)
- Elevation: 478 m (1,568 ft)

Population (December 2007)
  - Total: 9,119
  - Density: 616.1/km^{2} (1,596/sq mi)
- Time zone: UTC+01:00 (CET)
  - Summer (DST): UTC+02:00 (CEST)
- Postal code: 8124
- SFOS number: 195
- ISO 3166 code: CH-ZH
- Surrounded by: Egg, Fällanden, Greifensee, Herrliberg, Küsnacht, Mönchaltorf, Uster, Zollikon, Zumikon, Zurich
- Website: www.maur.ch

Maur is a municipality in the district of Uster in the canton of Zurich in Switzerland.

== History ==
Maur is first mentioned between 874 and 887 as de Mure.

== Geography ==
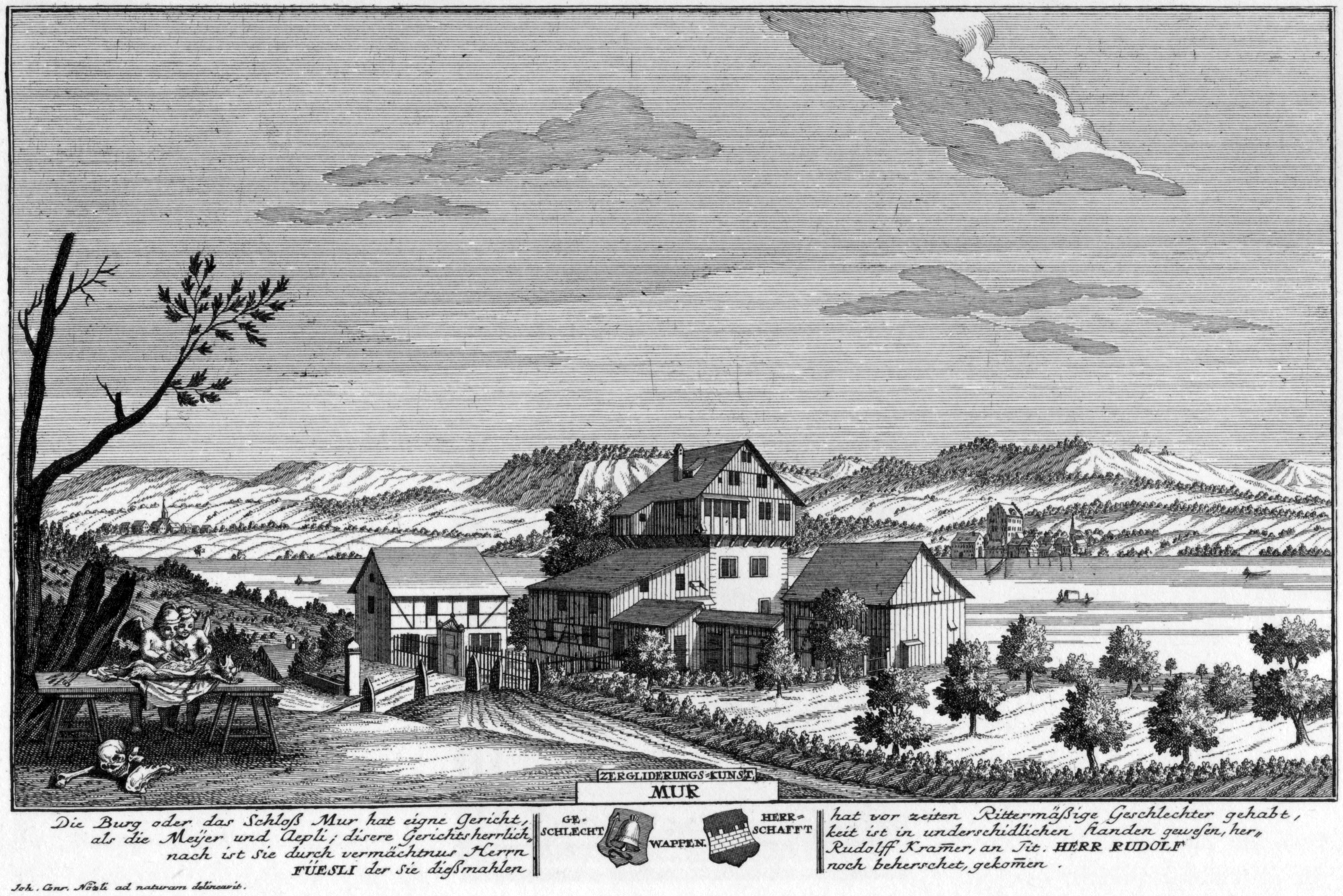
Maur castle (1741)

Aerial view from 200 m by Walter Mittelholzer (1931)

Maur has an area of 14.8 km^{2} (5.7 sq mi). Of this area, 52.6% is used for agricultural purposes, while 26.9% is forested. Of the rest of the land, 20.2% is settled (buildings or roads) and the remainder (0.3%) is non-productive (rivers, glaciers or mountains). In 1996, housing and buildings made up 14.9% of the total area, while transportation infrastructure made up the rest (5.5%). Of the total unproductive area, water (streams and lakes) made up 0% of the area. As of 2007, 17% of the total municipal area was undergoing some type of construction.

The municipality is located on the south-west shore of the Greifensee. It includes the village of Maur and the settlements of Aesch, Scheuren (Forch), Binz, Ebmatingen and Uessikon.

== Economy ==
For a long time, the village was cut off from the major traffic routes. Without railways and without water-rich streams, no industry could gain a foothold in the municipality. Even today, agriculture is still an important employer, along with a few small service and craft businesses. Four-fifths of the working population earn their living outside the municipality, mostly in the city of Zurich and the surrounding towns. The number of commuters who live in Maur and work in another municipality is twice as high as the total number of people working in Maur.

== Demographics ==
Maur has a population (as of 2007) of 9,119, of which 17.0% are foreign nationals. As of 2008 the gender distribution of the population was 49.2% male and 50.8% female. Over the last 10 years the population has grown at a rate of 10.9%. Most of the population (as of 2000) speaks German (86.4%), with English being second most common ( 3.6%) and French being third ( 2.1%).

In the 2007 election the most popular party was the SVP which received 36% of the vote. The next three most popular parties were the FDP (19.8%), the SPS (13.9%) and the CSP (12%).

The age distribution of the population (as of 2000) is children and teenagers (0–19 years old) make up 21.9% of the population, while adults (20–64 years old) make up 65.6% and seniors (over 64 years old) make up 12.5%. The entire Swiss population is generally well educated. In Maur about 88.3% of the population (between age 25 and 64) have completed either non-mandatory upper secondary education or additional higher education (either university or a Fachhochschule). There are 3741 households in Maur.

Maur has an unemployment rate of 2.03%. As of 2005, there were 147 people employed in the primary economic sector and about 56 businesses involved in this sector. 389 people are employed in the secondary sector and there are 71 businesses in this sector. 1411 people are employed in the tertiary sector, with 339 businesses in this sector. As of 2007 48.7% of the working population were employed full-time, and 51.3% were employed part-time.

As of 2008 there were 2206 Catholics and 3997 Protestants in Maur. In the 2000 census, religion was broken down into several smaller categories. From the census, 49.1% were some type of Protestant, with 46.1% belonging to the Swiss Reformed Church and 3% belonging to other Protestant churches. 24.1% of the population were Catholic. Of the rest of the population, 0% were Muslim, 4.7% belonged to another religion (not listed), 3% did not give a religion, and 18.4% were atheist or agnostic.

The historical population is given in the following table:

year	population
1798	1,623
1836	2,133
1850	1,965
1900	1,513
1910	1,421
1950	1,577
1970	3,943
2000	8,677
