= Fällanden =

- Municipality
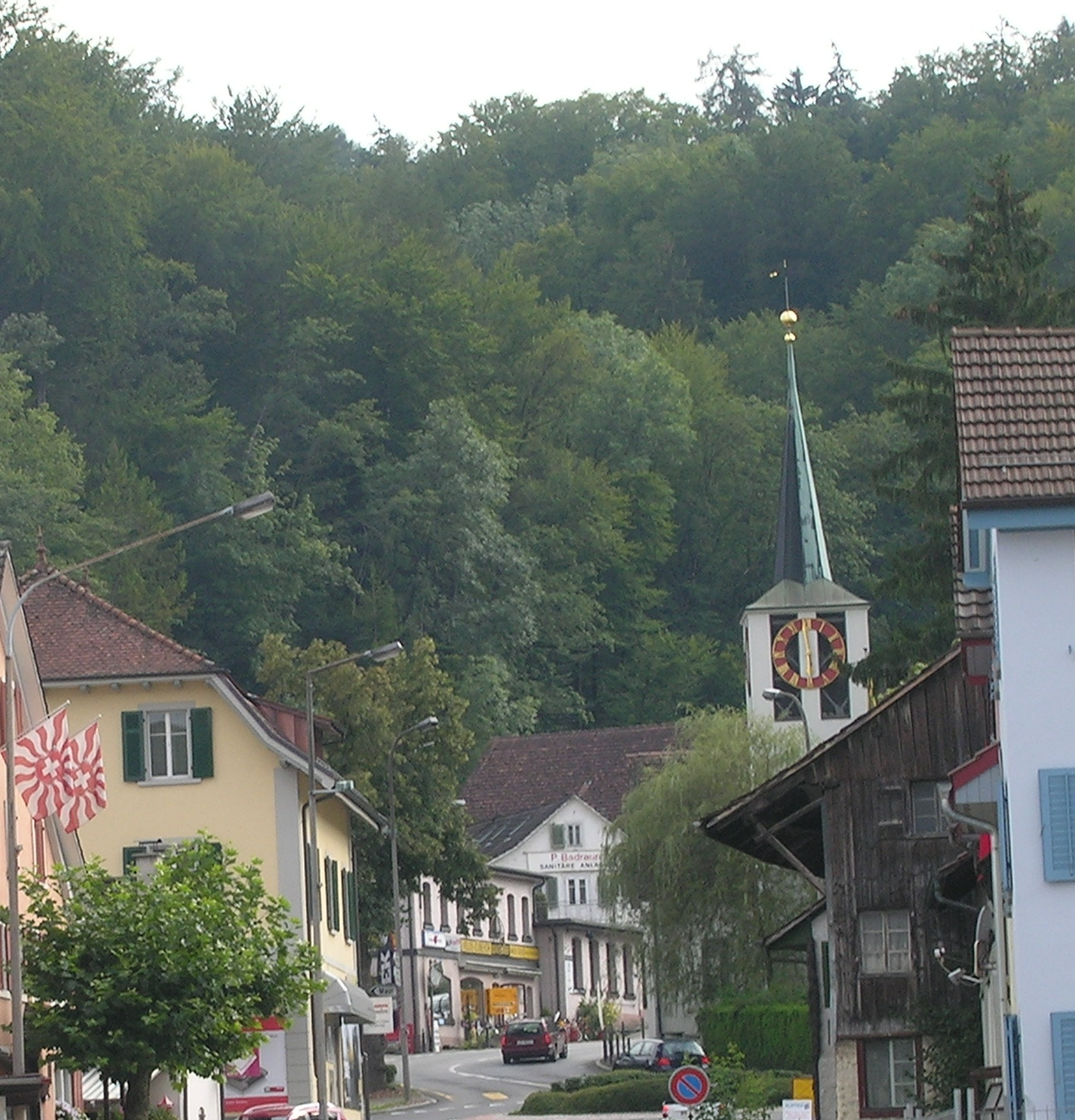

- Flag Coat of arms
- Location of Fällanden
- Location within Switzerland Location within Canton of Zurich
- Coordinates: 47°22′N 8°38′E
- Country: Switzerland
- Canton: Zurich
- District: Uster

Area
  - Total: 6.41 km^{2} (2.47 sq mi)
- Elevation: 491 m (1,611 ft)

Population (December 2020)
  - Total: 8,934
  - Density: 1,390/km^{2} (3,610/sq mi)
- Time zone: UTC+01:00 (CET)
  - Summer (DST): UTC+02:00 (CEST)
- Postal code: 8117
- SFOS number: 193
- ISO 3166 code: CH-ZH
- Localities: Fällanden, Benglen, Pfaffhausen
- Surrounded by: Dübendorf, Greifensee, Maur, Schwerzenbach, Zurich
- Website: www.faellanden.ch

Fällanden is a municipality in the district of Uster in the canton of Zürich in Switzerland, and belongs to the Glatt Valley (German: Glattal).

== History ==
Fällanden is first mentioned around 820 as Fenichlanda.

== Geography ==
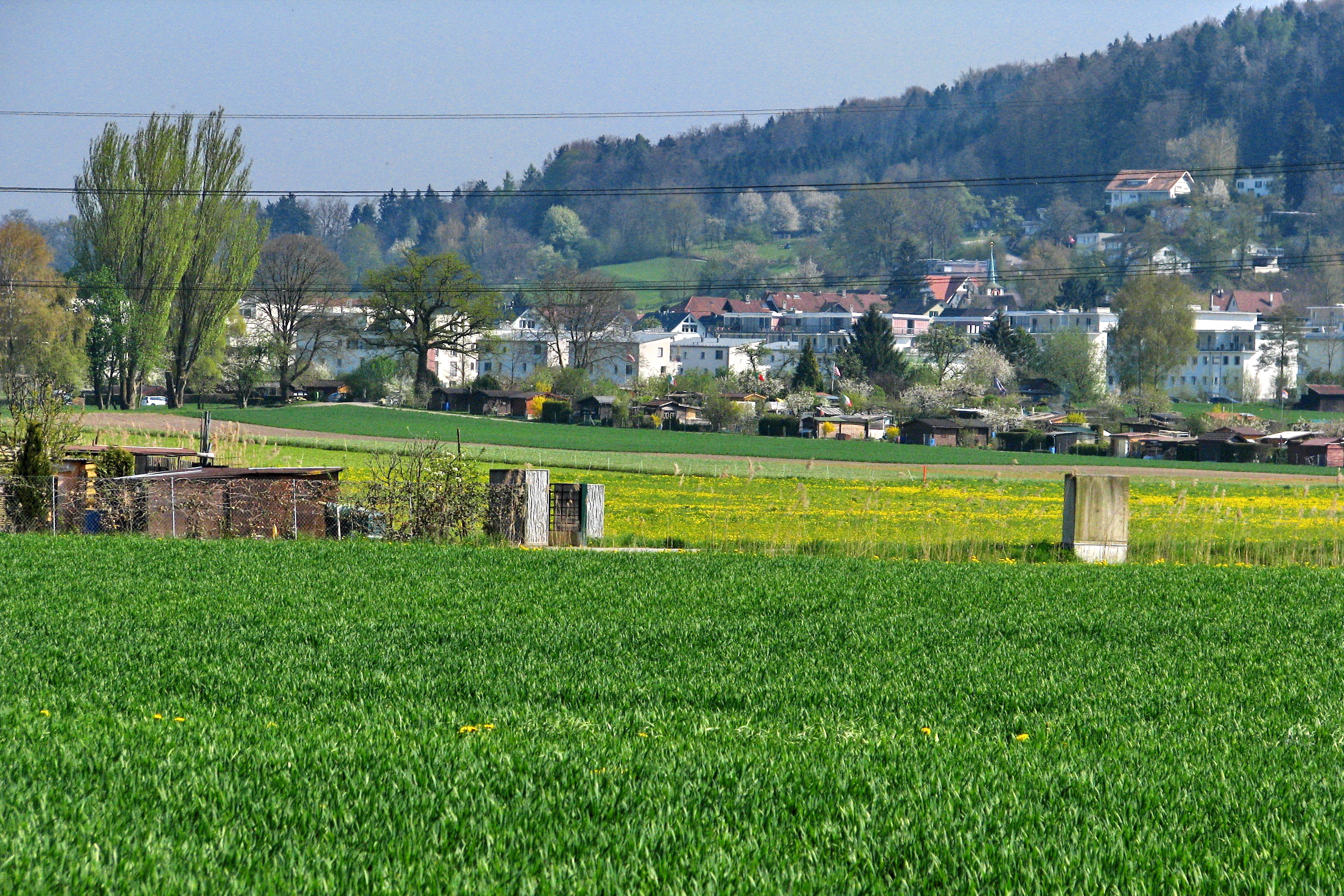
Fällanden as seen from Glatt river

Aerial view by Walter Mittelholzer (1923)

Fällanden has an area of 6.4 km^{2} (2.5 sq mi). Of this area, 40.8% is used for agricultural purposes, while 29.4% is forested. Of the rest of the land, 26.2% is settled (buildings or roads) and the remainder (3.6%) is non-productive (rivers, etc.). In 1996 housing and buildings made up 20% of the total area, while transportation infrastructure made up the rest (6.1%). Of the total unproductive area, water (streams and lakes) made up 1.2% of the area. As of 2007 26.7% of the total municipal area was undergoing some type of construction.

The municipality is an agglomeration that grew up from the village of Fällanden and the settlements of Benglen, Pfaffhausen und Neuhausen. It is located on the north-east slope of the Pfannenstiel mountain chain, with Greifensee lake nearby.

== Transportation ==
Bus lines branch toward Schwerzenbach, Duebendorf, Maur and uphill directly to Zurich, giving good enough connection for the people to work in central areas of Zurich. Fällanden has special bus lanes, ensuring efficient operation also in high traffic hours.

== Demographics ==
Fällanden has a population (as of 31 December 2020) of 8,934. As of 2007, 18.2% of the population was made up of foreign nationals. As of 2008 the gender distribution of the population was 49.3% male and 50.7% female. Over the last 10 years the population has grown at a rate of 12.6%. Most of the population (as of 2000) speaks German (86.8%), with French being second most common (1.9%) and English being third (1.8%).

In the 2007 election the most popular party was the SVP which received 30.8% of the vote. The next three most popular parties were the SPS (18.3%), the FDP (17%) and the CSP (13.4%).

The age distribution of the population (as of 2000) is children and teenagers (0–19 years old) make up 21.3% of the population, while adults (20–64 years old) make up 67.6% and seniors (over 64 years old) make up 11.1%. The entire Swiss population is generally well educated. In Fällanden about 84.3% of the population (between age 25–64) have completed either non-mandatory upper secondary education or additional higher education (either university or a Fachhochschule). There are 2855 households in Fällanden.

Fällanden has an unemployment rate of 2.62%. As of 2005, there were 21 people employed in the primary economic sector and about 10 businesses involved in this sector. 988 people are employed in the secondary sector and there are 68 businesses in this sector. 1,221 people are employed in the tertiary sector, with 213 businesses in this sector. As of 2007 31.8% of the working population were employed full-time, and 68.2% were employed part-time.

As of 2008 there were 2,178 Catholics and 2,887 Protestants in Fällanden. In the 2000 census, religion was broken down into several smaller categories. From the census, 43.9% were some type of Protestant, with 41.7% belonging to the Swiss Reformed Church and 2.2% belonging to other Protestant churches. 28.8% of the population were Catholic. Of the rest of the population, 0% were Muslim, 5.6% belonged to another religion (not listed), 3.1% did not give a religion, and 17.9% were atheist or agnostic.

The historical population is given in the following table:

year	population
1634	284
1799	632
1850	848
1900	696
1950	866
1970	4,260
1990	6,489
2000	6,423

== Industry ==
The town has a small industrial district, largely dominated by Bruker that manufactures medical NMR scanners and related devices. It is the former Swiss Trüb-Täuber, purchased by Bruker in 1964. Another notable manufacturer is Bucher Leichtbau AG (aircraft interior and medical equipment like seats, tables and lockers). There are also more facilities like glass factory and some others. The 120 km (75 mi), 380 kV Sils-Fällanden power line ends near the town towards Dübendorf.

== Notable people ==
- Rudolf Wolf (1816–1893), astronomer and mathematician
- Albert Meyer (1870–1953), politician and member of the Swiss Federal Council
