= Volketswil =

- Municipality
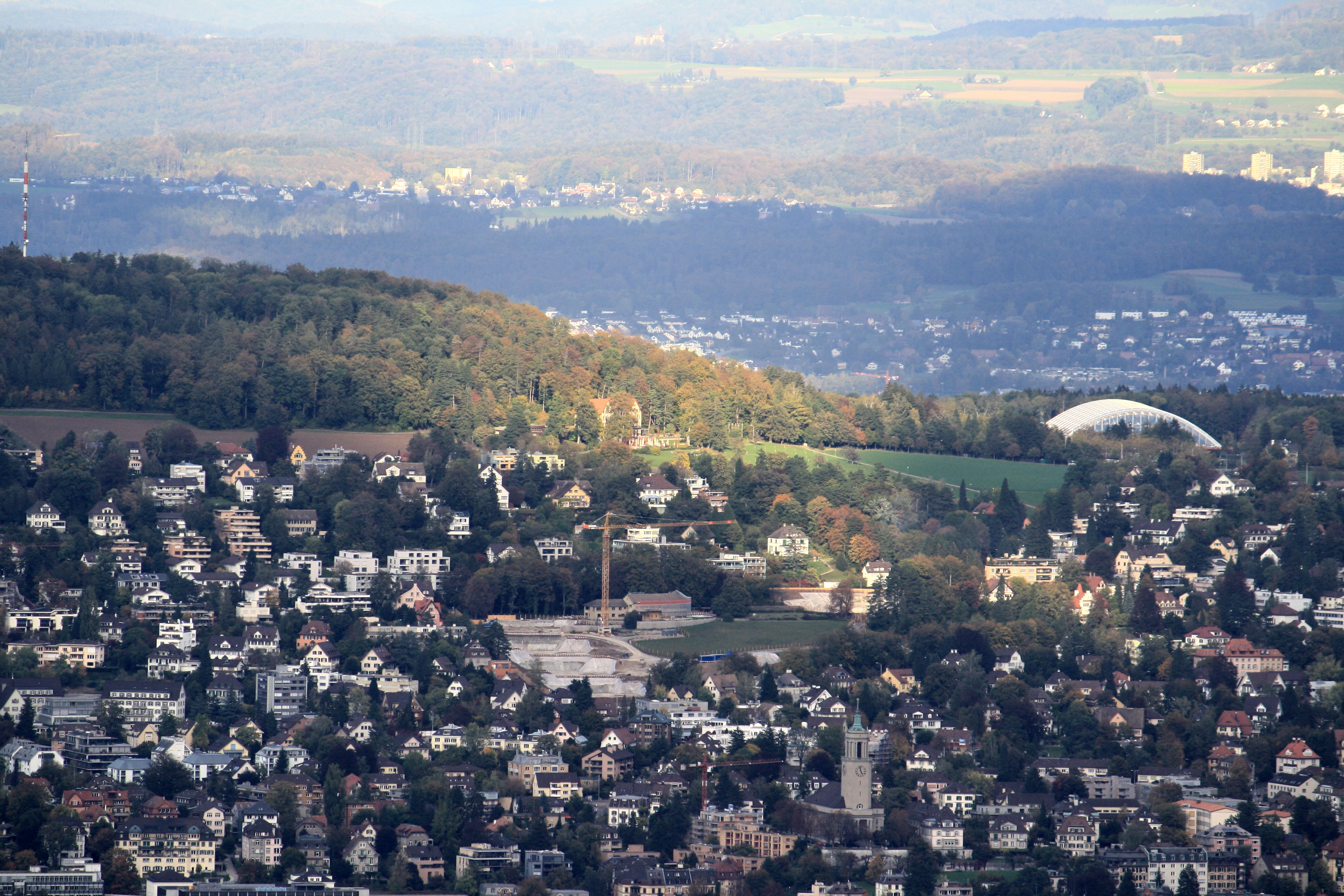

- Flag Coat of arms
- Location of Volketswil
- Location within Switzerland Location within Canton of Zurich
- Coordinates: 47°23′N 8°42′E
- Country: Switzerland
- Canton: Zurich
- District: Uster

Area
  - Total: 14.00 km^{2} (5.41 sq mi)
- Elevation: 470 m (1,540 ft)

Population (December 2020)
  - Total: 18,865
  - Density: 1,347/km^{2} (3,490/sq mi)
- Time zone: UTC+01:00 (CET)
  - Summer (DST): UTC+02:00 (CEST)
- Postal code: 8604
- SFOS number: 199
- ISO 3166 code: CH-ZH
- Surrounded by: Dübendorf, Fehraltorf, Greifensee, Illnau-Effretikon, Lindau, Schwerzenbach, Uster, Wangen-Brüttisellen
- Twin towns: Gadmen (Switzerland)
- Website: www.volketswil.ch

Volketswil is a municipality in the district of Uster in the canton of Zürich in Switzerland. The municipality in the agglomeration of Zurich includes the villages of Volketswil, Hegnau, Zimikon, Kindhausen and Gutenswil.

== Geography ==
Aerial view (1965)

Volketswil has an area of 14 km^{2} (5.4 sq mi). Of this area, 42.5% is used for agricultural purposes, while 24.6% is forested. Of the rest of the land, 32.1% is settled (buildings or roads) and the remainder (0.8%) is non-productive (rivers, glaciers or mountains). In 1996 housing and buildings made up 22.4% of the total area, while transportation infrastructure made up the rest (9.9%). Of the total unproductive area, water (streams and lakes) made up 0.2% of the area. As of 2007 30.1% of the total municipal area was undergoing some type of construction.

== Economy ==
Volketswil benefits from its close proximity to the cities of Zurich, Winterthur and Uster, as well as to Zurich Airport. The 800 or so companies located here employ over 9,500 people. In recent decades, various shopping centres and specialist markets have settled in Volketswil. From 1934 to 1972, the nationally known breakfast drink "Forsanose", a cocoa malt powder, was produced in Volketswil.

Volketswil is the headquarters and broadcasting and production centre of Switzerland's largest pay-TV channel, Teleclub. Since 2019, the same building has also been home to the control centre for video assistant referees of the Swiss Football League, making "Volketswil" a familiar name for football fans in Switzerland.

== Demographics ==
Volketswil has a population (as of 31 December 2020) of 18,865. As of 2007, 22.2% of the population was made up of foreign nationals. As of 2008 the gender distribution of the population was 50% male and 50% female. Over the last 10 years the population has grown at a rate of 19.4%. Most of the population (as of 2000) speaks German (85.3%), with Italian being second most common ( 3.1%) and Albanian being third ( 2.5%).

In the 2007 election the most popular party was the SVP which received 48.7% of the vote. The next three most popular parties were the SPS (13.9%), the FDP (10.7%) and the CSP (10%).

The age distribution of the population (as of 2000) is children and teenagers (0–19 years old) make up 23.7% of the population, while adults (20–64 years old) make up 68.9% and seniors (over 64 years old) make up 7.4%. In Volketswil about 76.8% of the population (between age 25-64) have completed either non-mandatory upper secondary education or additional higher education (either university or a Fachhochschule). There are 5988 households in Volketswil.

Volketswil has an unemployment rate of 3.3%. As of 2005, there were 127 people employed in the primary economic sector and about 39 businesses involved in this sector. 3270 people are employed in the secondary sector and there are 180 businesses in this sector. 5698 people are employed in the tertiary sector, with 607 businesses in this sector. As of 2007 36.7% of the working population were employed full-time, and 63.3% were employed part-time.

As of 2008 there were 4898 Catholics and 5868 Protestants in Volketswil. In the 2000 census, religion was broken down into several smaller categories. From the census, 43.5% were some type of Protestant, with 41.1% belonging to the Swiss Reformed Church and 2.3% belonging to other Protestant churches. 32.2% of the population were Catholic. Of the rest of the population, 7.6% were Muslim, 9.4% belonged to another religion (not listed), 2.7% did not give a religion, and 11.3% were atheist or agnostic.

== Notable people ==
- Ronny Keller (born 1979) a former Swiss ice hockey defenceman
- Dean Kukan (born 1993) a Swiss professional ice hockey defenceman
