= Cambodunum =

Cambodunum is a Latinized Celtic placename which may refer to:

- Cambodunum (Britain), present-day Slack, West Yorkshire
- Cambodunum (Germany), present-day Kempten
- Cambodunum (Switzerland), a Roman villa rustica in Kempten
