= Irgenhausen =

Former municipality of Switzerland in Zurich

- Former municipality
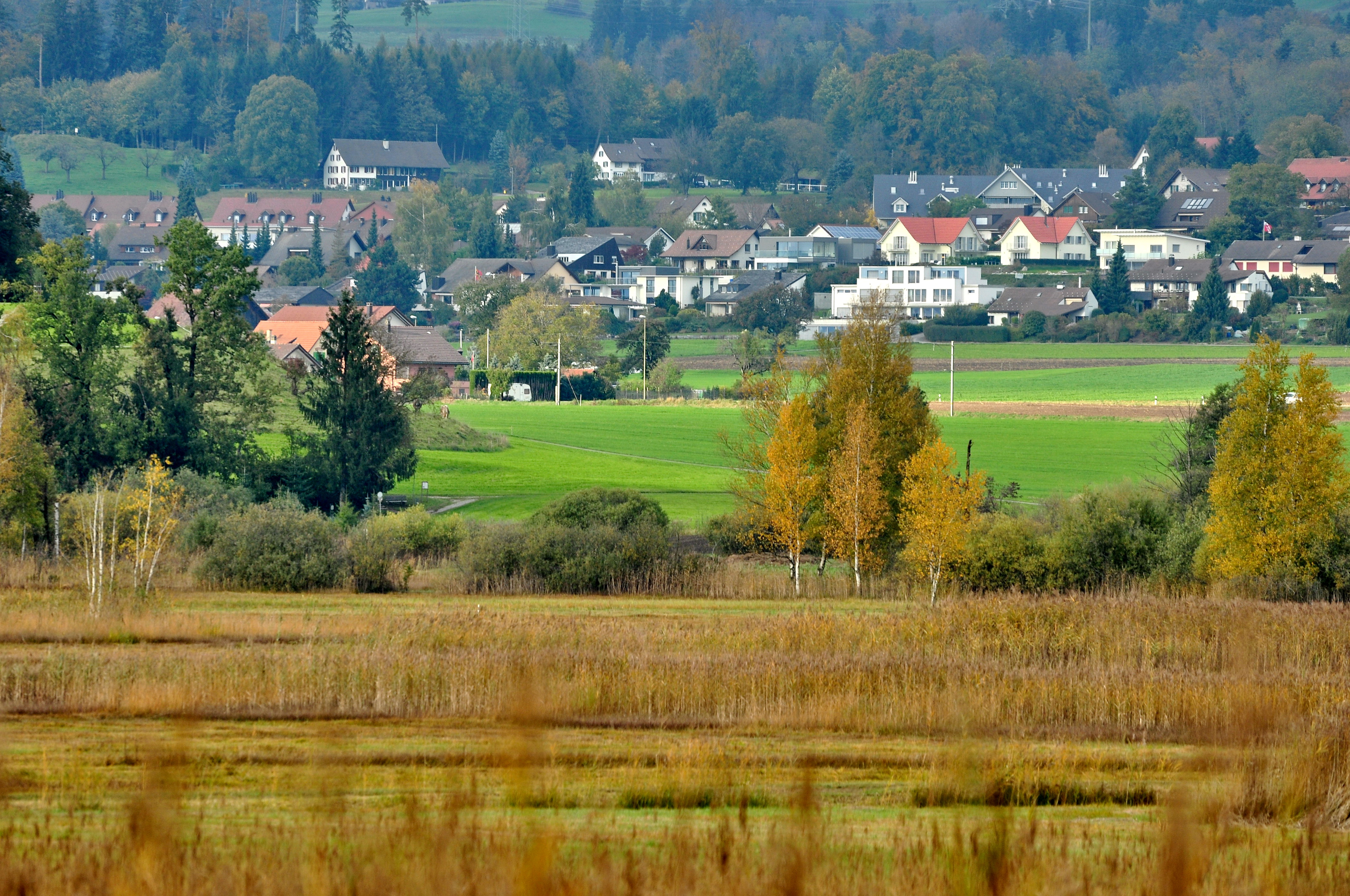
- Irgenhausen as seen from Auslikon (April 2010)
- Location of Irgenhausen
- Location within Switzerland Location within Canton of Zurich
- Coordinates: 47°21.58′N 8°47.6′E
- Country: Switzerland
- Canton: Zurich
- District: Pfäffikon
- Municipality: Pfäffikon
- Elevation: 556 m (1,824 ft)

Population (December 2007)
  - Total: 0
- Time zone: UTC+01:00 (CET)
  - Summer (DST): UTC+02:00 (CEST)
- Postal code: 8330
- ISO 3166 code: CH-ZH
- Surrounded by: Auslikon, Kempten, Wetzikon
- Website: www.pfaeffikon.ch

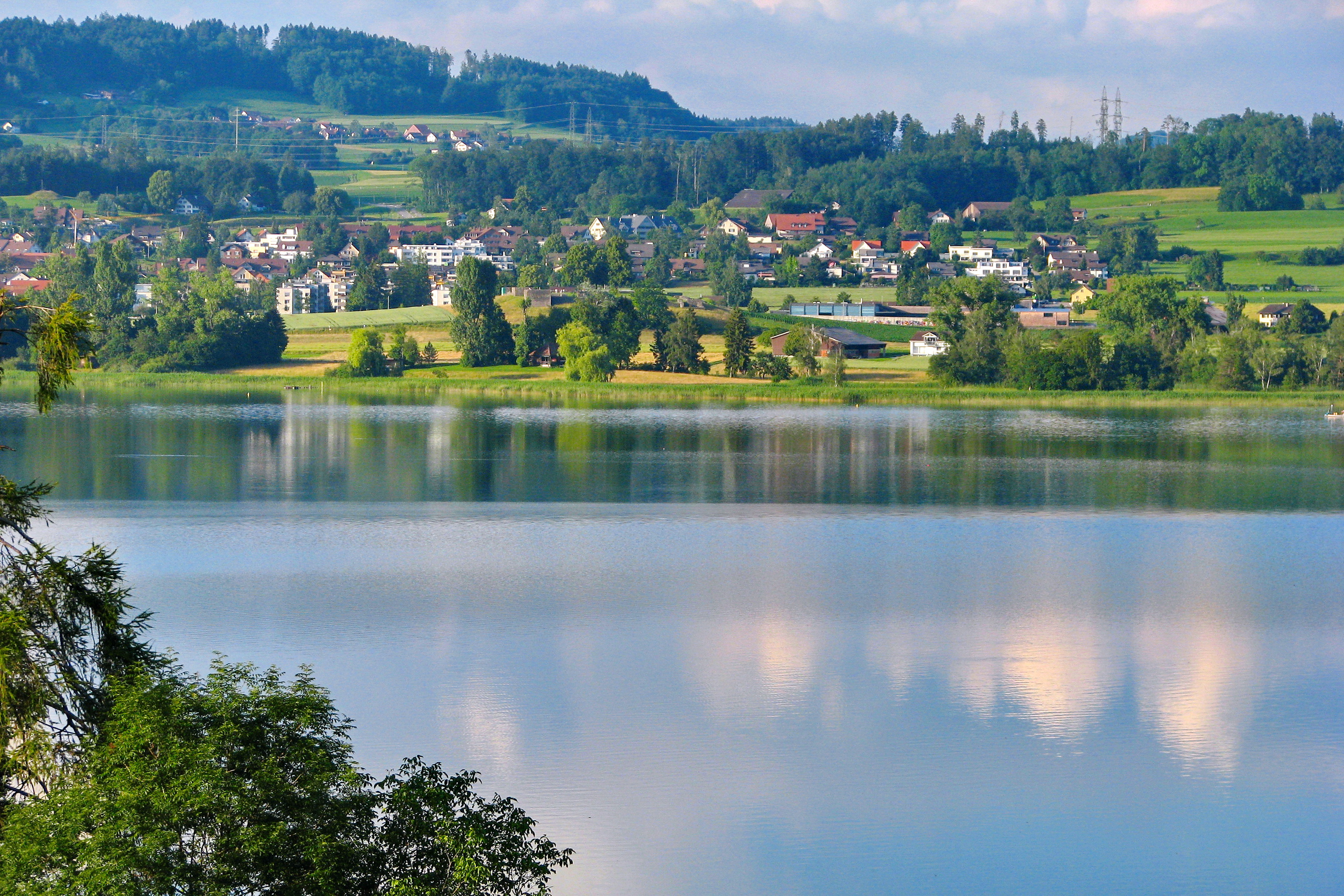
Irgenhausen as seen from Seegräben (June 2009)

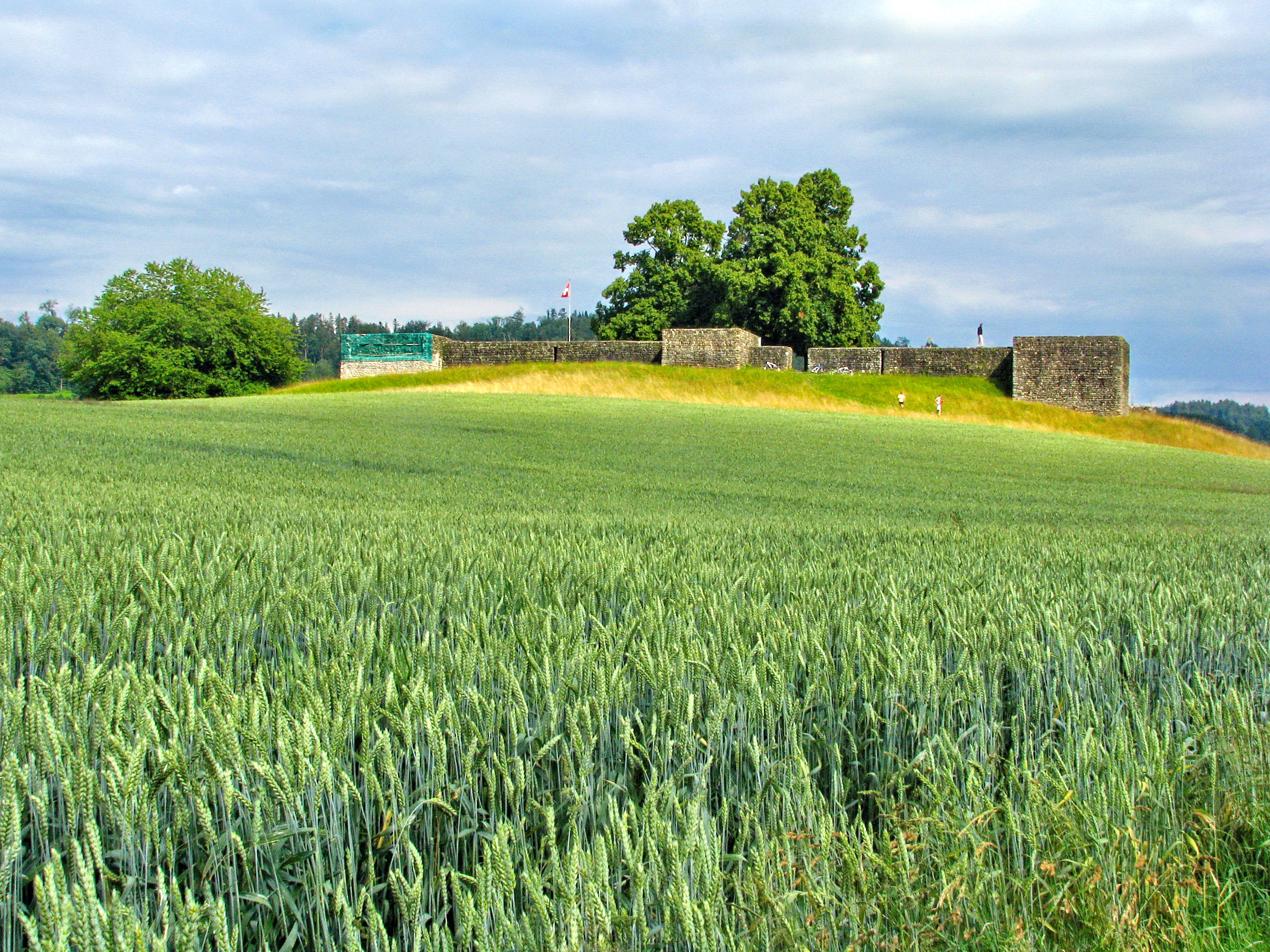
Irgenhausen Castrum as seen from the northwest

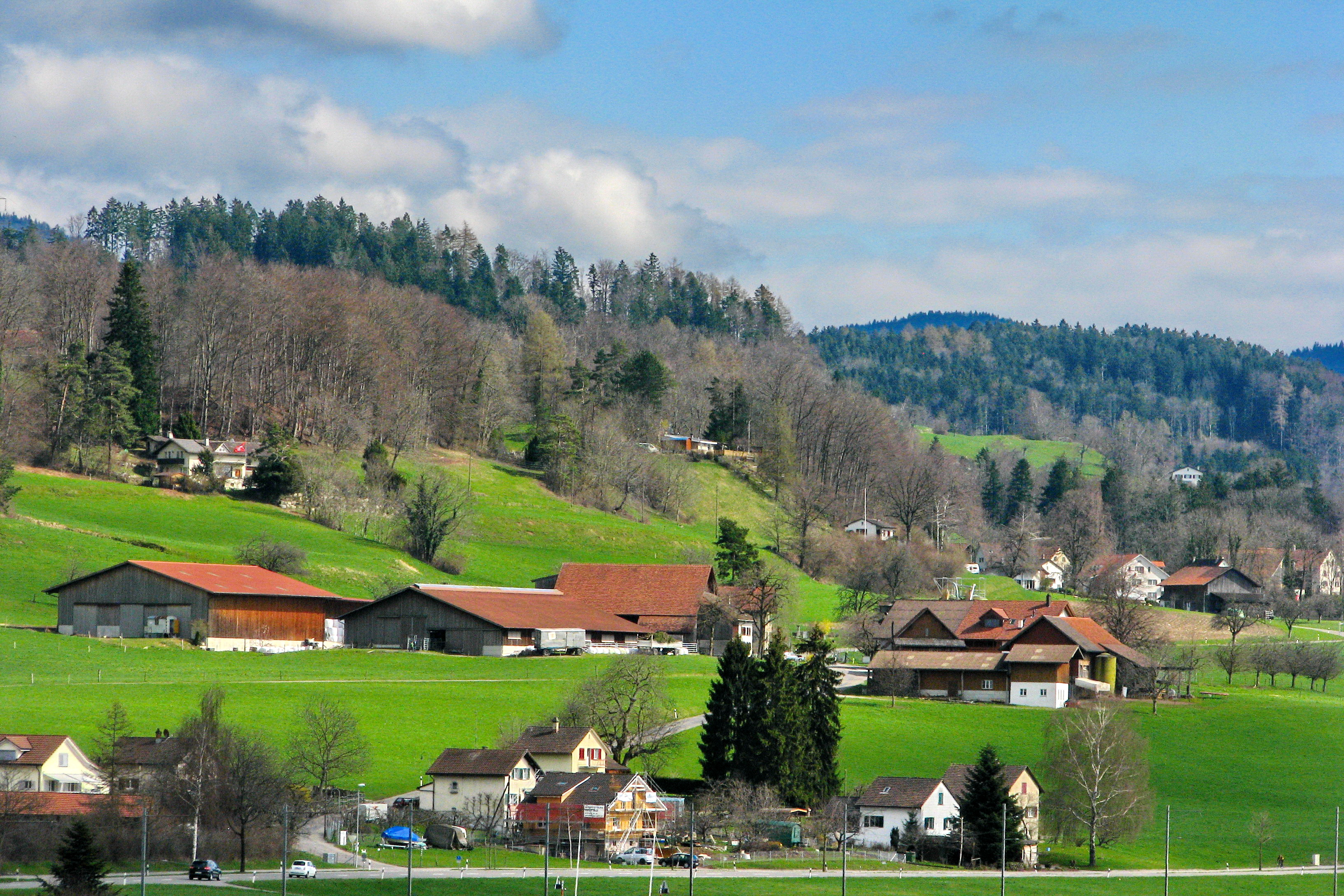

Irgenhausen is a village (Aussenwacht) of the municipality of Pfäffikon in the canton of Zurich in Switzerland.

== Geography ==
Irgenhausen is located in the district of Pfäffikon in the Zürcher Oberland on the eastern shore of the Pfäffikersee (Lake Pfäffikon).

== Demographics ==
Irgenhausen belongs politically to the municipality of Pfäffikon.

== History ==
Aerial view (1946)

In Roman era, along Pfäffikersee there was a Roman road from the vicus Centum Prata (Kempraten) on Obersee–Lake Zürich via Vitudurum (Oberwinterthur) to Tasgetium (Eschenz) to the Rhine. To secure this important transport route, the Irgenhausen Castrum was built. The native name of the fort is unknown, thus Irgenhausen was mentioned in 811 AD as Camputuna sive Irincheshusa. Maybe the castrum's name was Cambodunum, the name of the neighboring village of Kempten.

== Points of interest ==
The Roman Irgenhausen Castrumis located in Irgenhausen on the shore of Pfäffikersee.

== Notable people ==
- Jakob Heusser (1862–1941), Swiss industrialist
