= Pfäffikersee =

Lake in Zurich, Switzerland

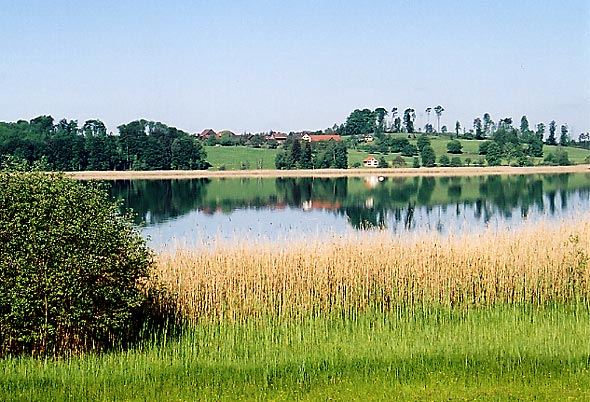

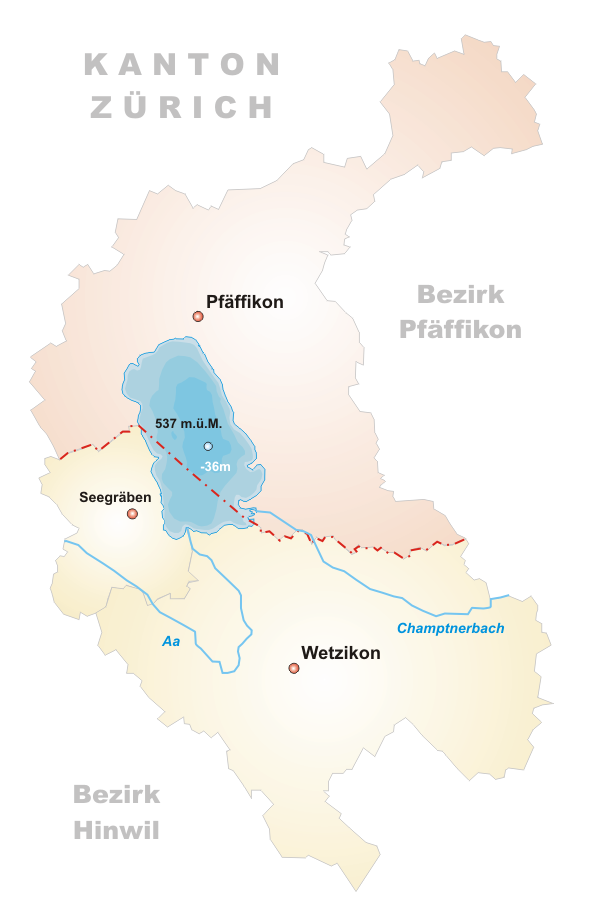
- Map of Pfäffikersee

- Location within Canton of Zurich Location within Switzerland Location within Alps
- Interactive map of Pfäffikersee
- Location: Canton of Zürich
- Coordinates: 47°21′08″N 08°46′48″E
- Primary inflows: Kemptnerbach
- Primary outflows: Aa
- Catchment area: 40 km^{2} (15 sq mi)
- Basin countries: Switzerland
- Max. length: 2.5 km (1.6 mi)
- Surface area: 3.3 km^{2} (1.3 sq mi)
- Average depth: 18.5 m (61 ft)
- Max. depth: 36 m (118 ft)
- Water volume: 0.059 km^{3} (0.014 cu mi)
- Residence time: 2.4 years
- Surface elevation: 537 m (1,762 ft)
- Settlements: Pfäffikon, Irgenhausen, Auslikon, Wetzikon, Seegräben

Pfäffikersee (or Lake Pfäffikon) is a lake in the canton of Zürich, Switzerland, near the town of Pfäffikon. It is 2.5 km long and 1.3 km wide at the middle. The lake was created in the last ice age when a moraine blocked off the ability for the lake to empty north towards Winterthur. There is also a hiking trail around the lake that people often bike and walk on, and the area is considered protected lands, among them the Robenhauser Ried and the prehistoric settlement Wetzikon–Robenhausen, discovered and researched by Jakob Messikommer (1828–1917), which became a serial site of the UNESCO World Heritage Site Prehistoric pile dwellings around the Alps. In Roman era, along Pfäffikersee there was a Roman road from the vicus Centum Prata (Kempraten) on Obersee–Lake Zürich via Vitudurum (Oberwinterthur) to Tasgetium (Eschenz) to the Rhine. To secure this important transport route, the Irgenhausen Castrum was built.

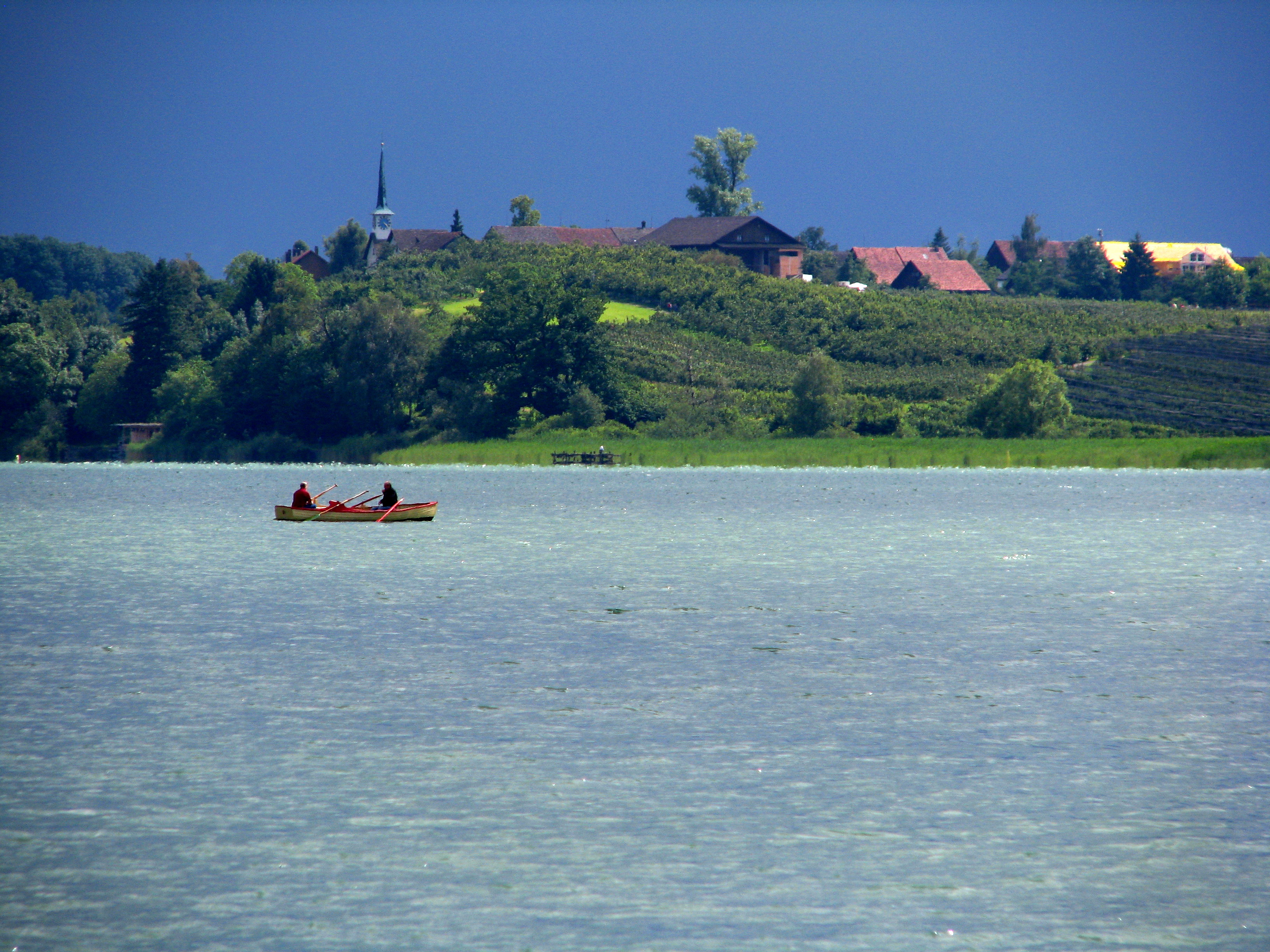
Pfäffikersee at Pfäffikon, Seegräben in the background

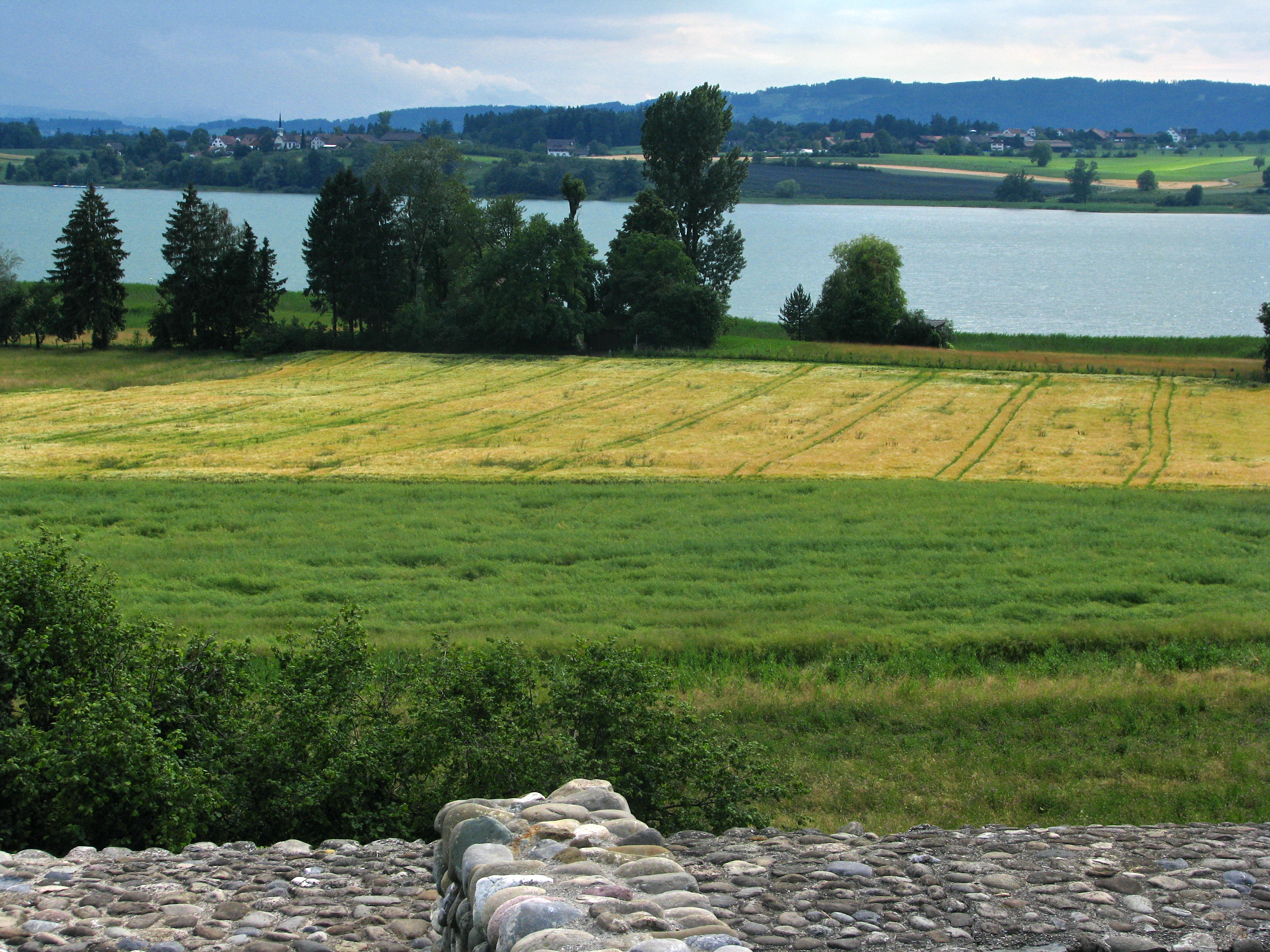
as seen from the Roman castrum Irgenhausen

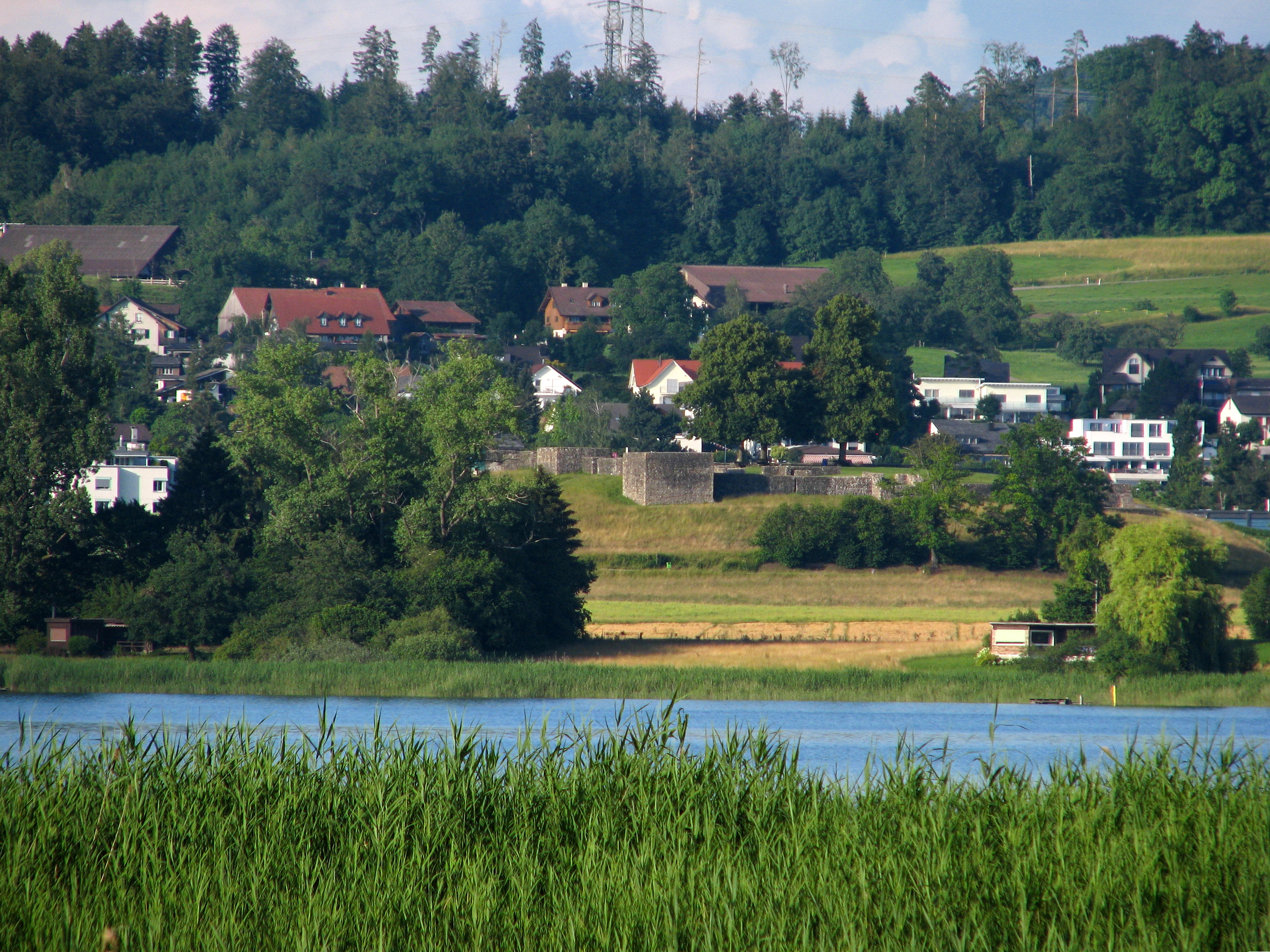
Bürglen drumlin in Irgenhausen where the Roman Irgenhausen Castrum is situated

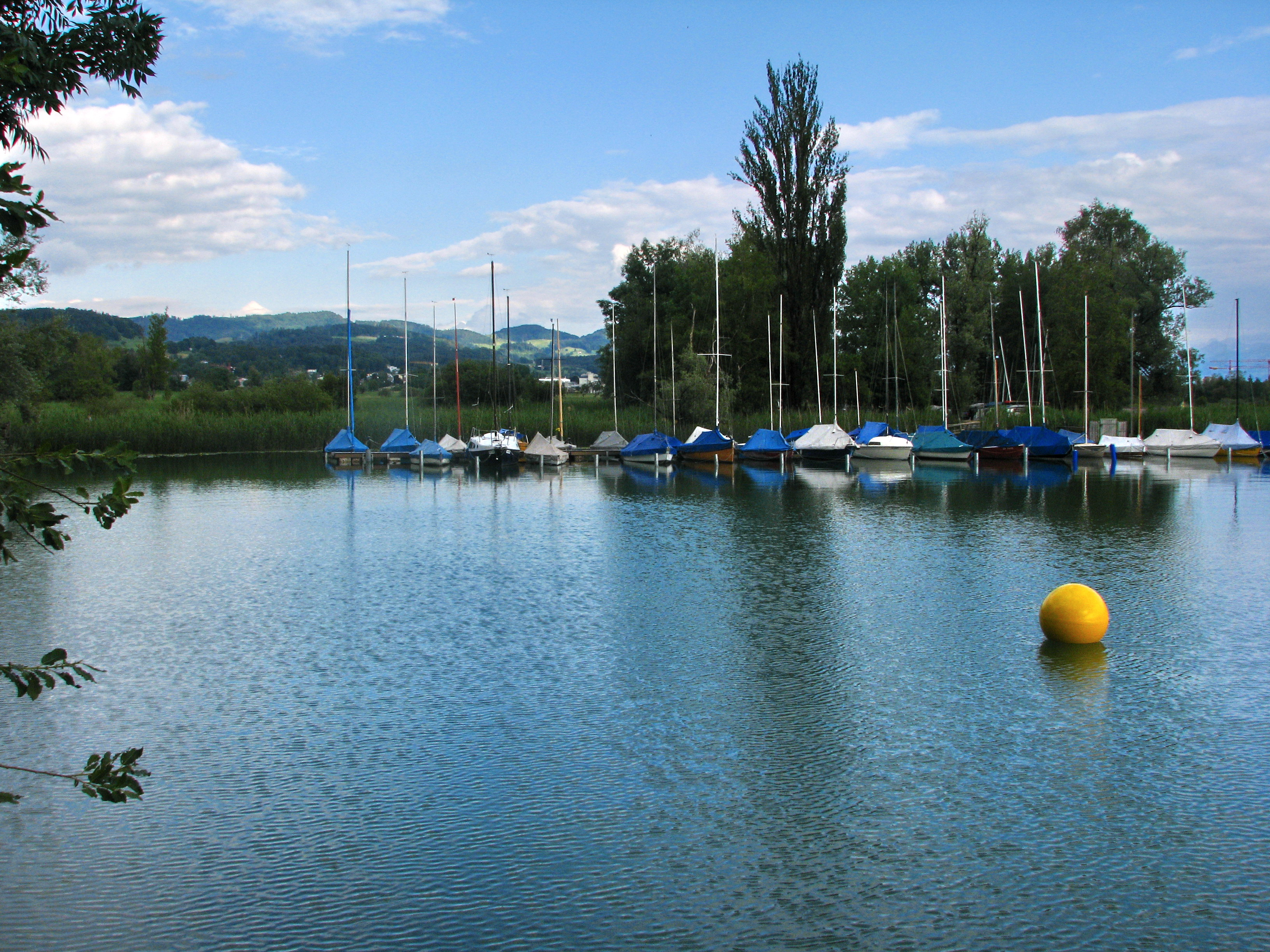
Auslikon lido, Wetzikon in the background

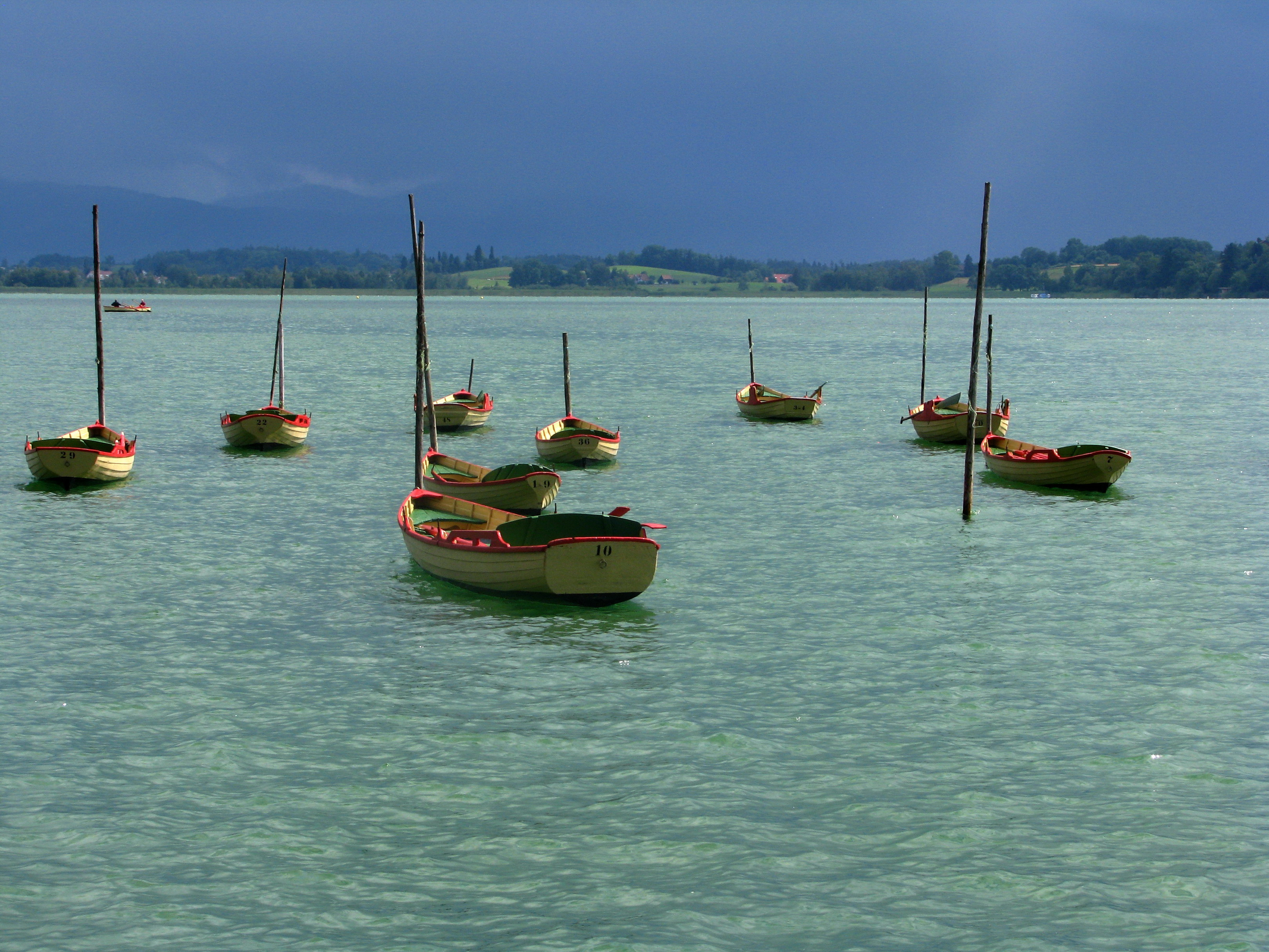
Pfäffikersee as seen to the south

== See also ==
- List of lakes of Switzerland
