= Kempten, Switzerland =

Kempten
- Former municipality
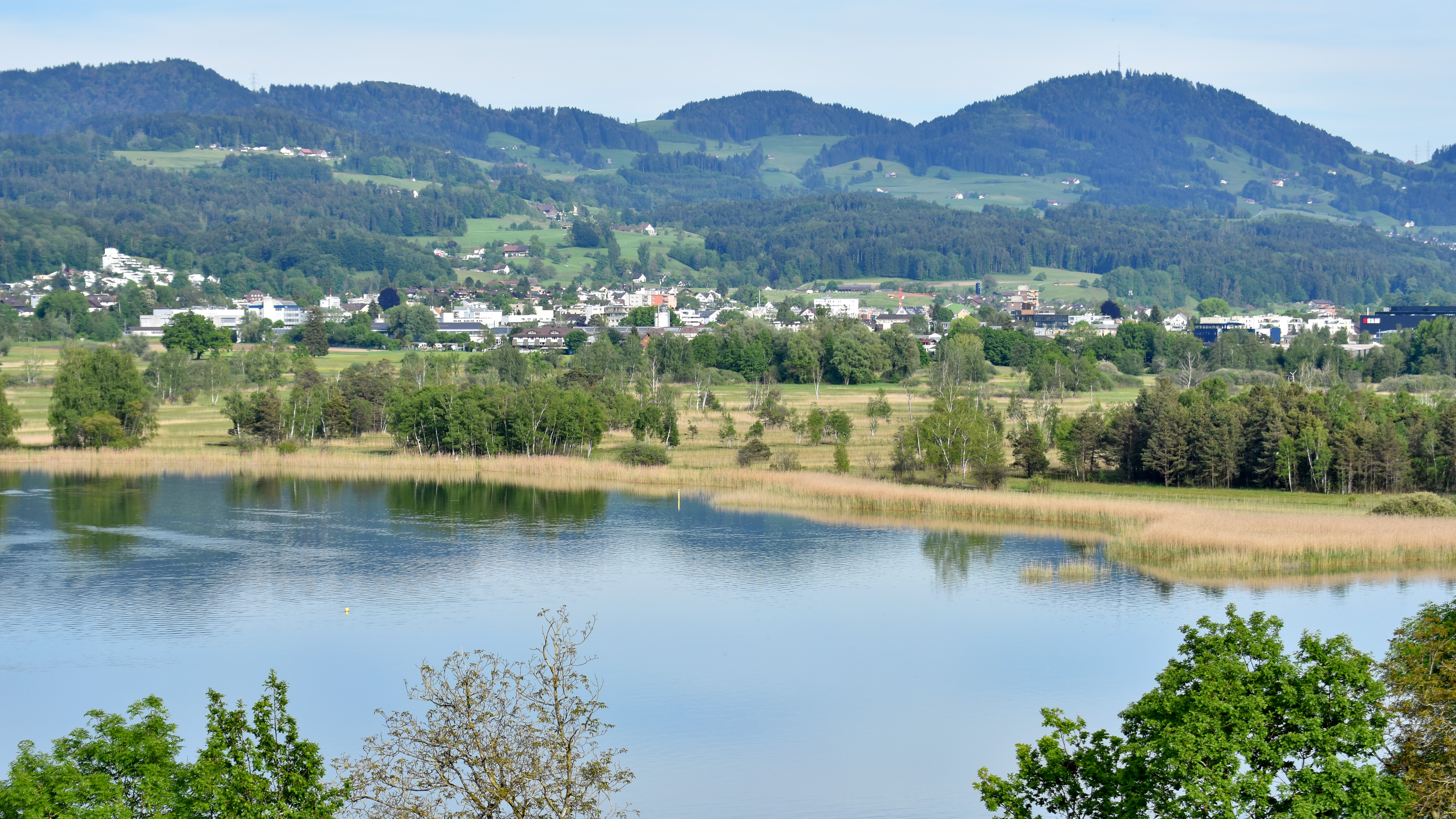
- Location of Kempten
- Location within Switzerland Location within Canton of Zurich
- Coordinates: 47°19.91′N 8°49.05′E
- Country: Switzerland
- Canton: Zurich
- District: Hinwil
- Municipality: Wetzikon
- Elevation: 569 m (1,867 ft)

Population (December 2007)
  - Total: 0
- Time zone: UTC+01:00 (CET)
  - Summer (DST): UTC+02:00 (CEST)
- Postal code: 8623
- ISO 3166 code: CH-ZH
- Surrounded by: Auslikon, Irgenhausen, Wetzikon
- Website: www.wetzikon.ch

Aerial view of Oberwetzikon in the direction of Kempten (1961)

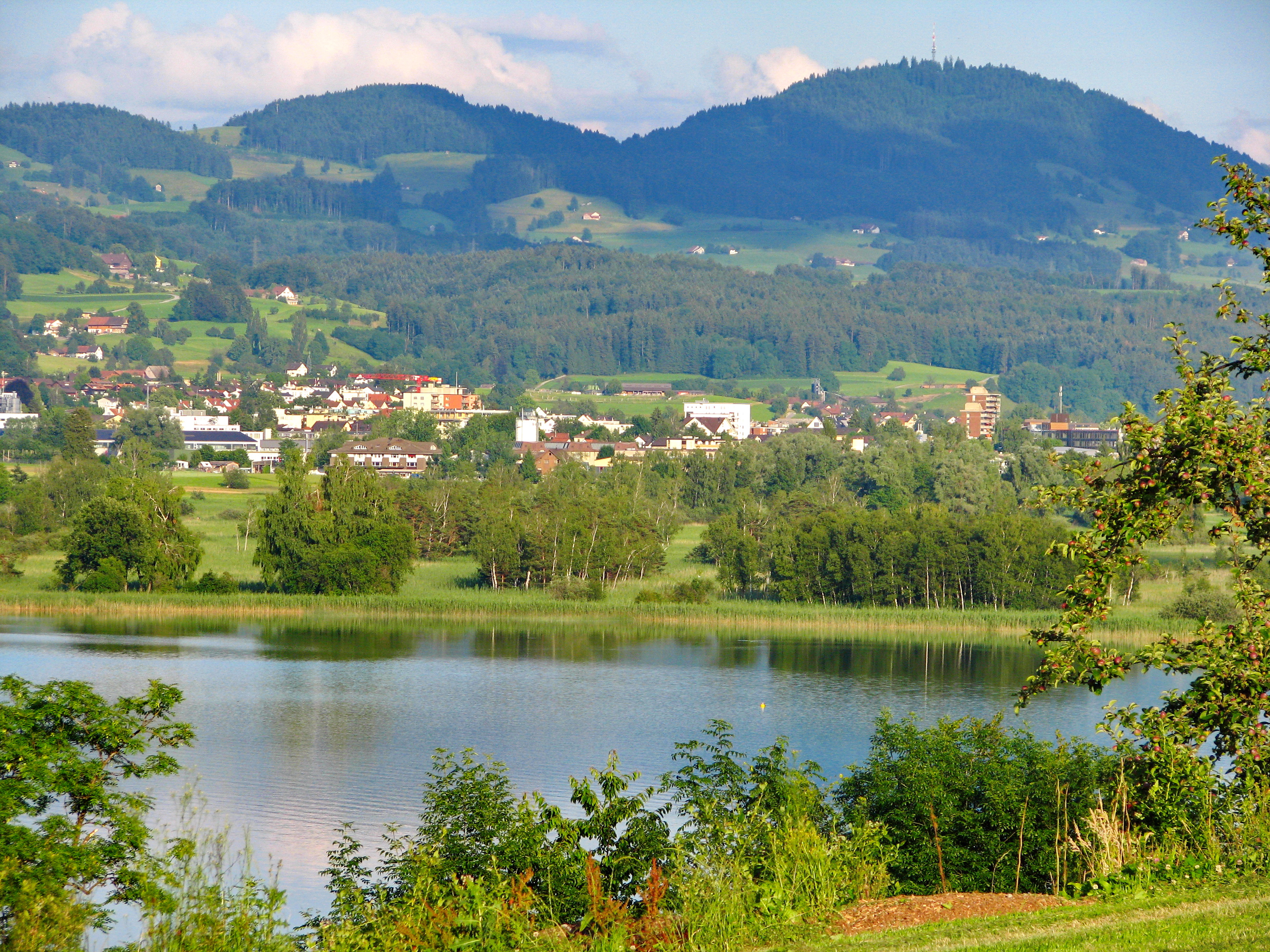
Kempten and Bachtel Tower (to the right) as seen from Seegräben (June 2009)

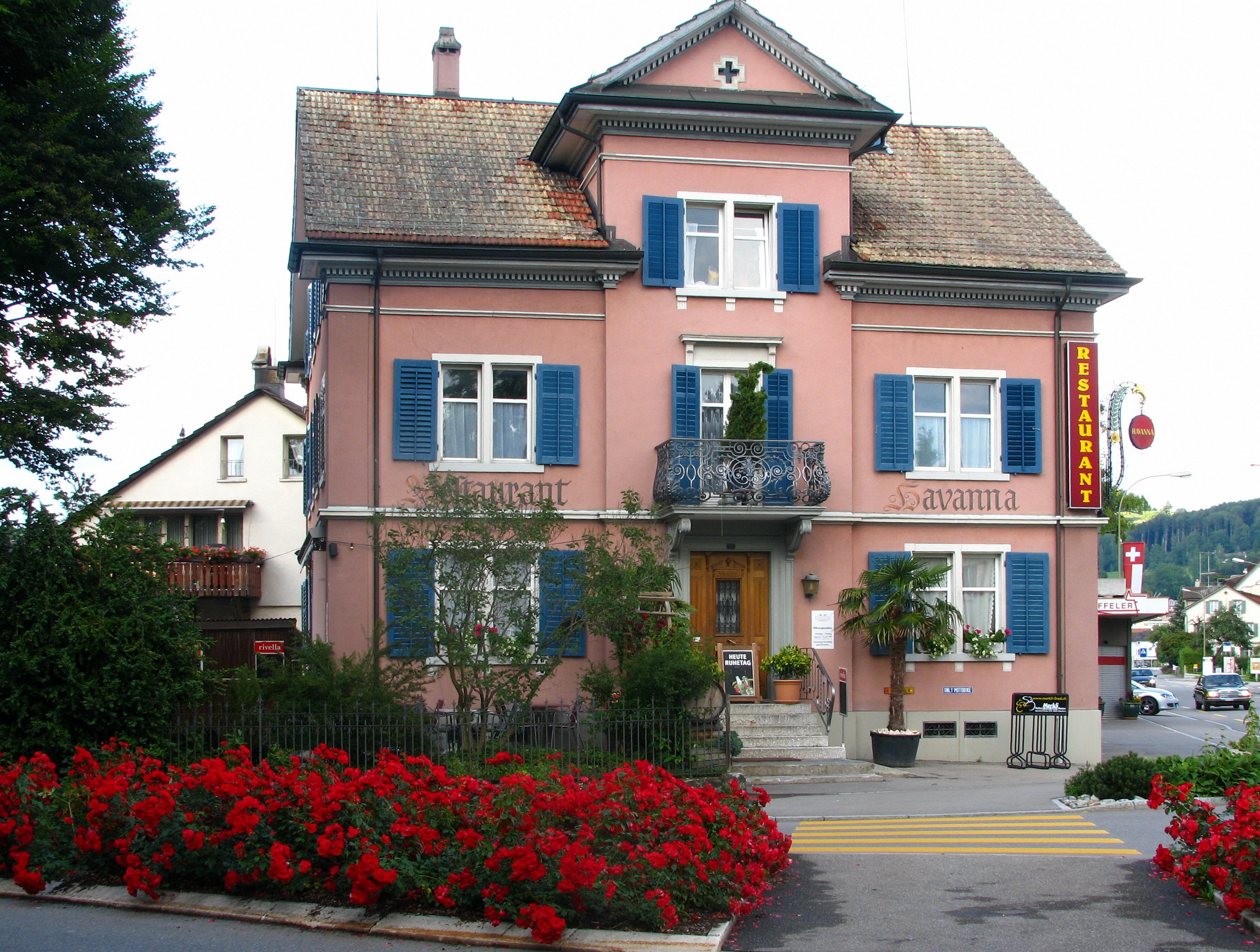

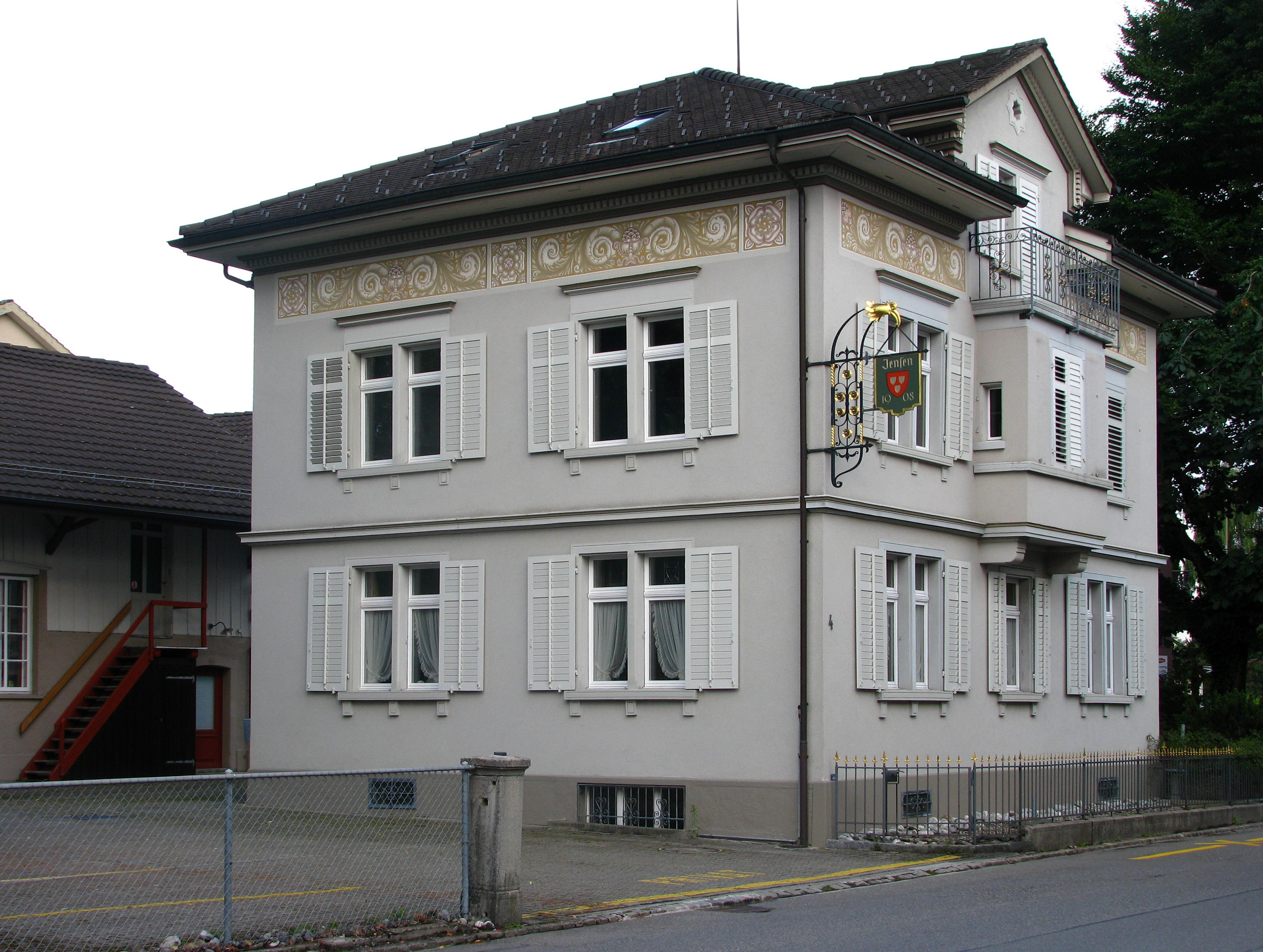
Malermuseum

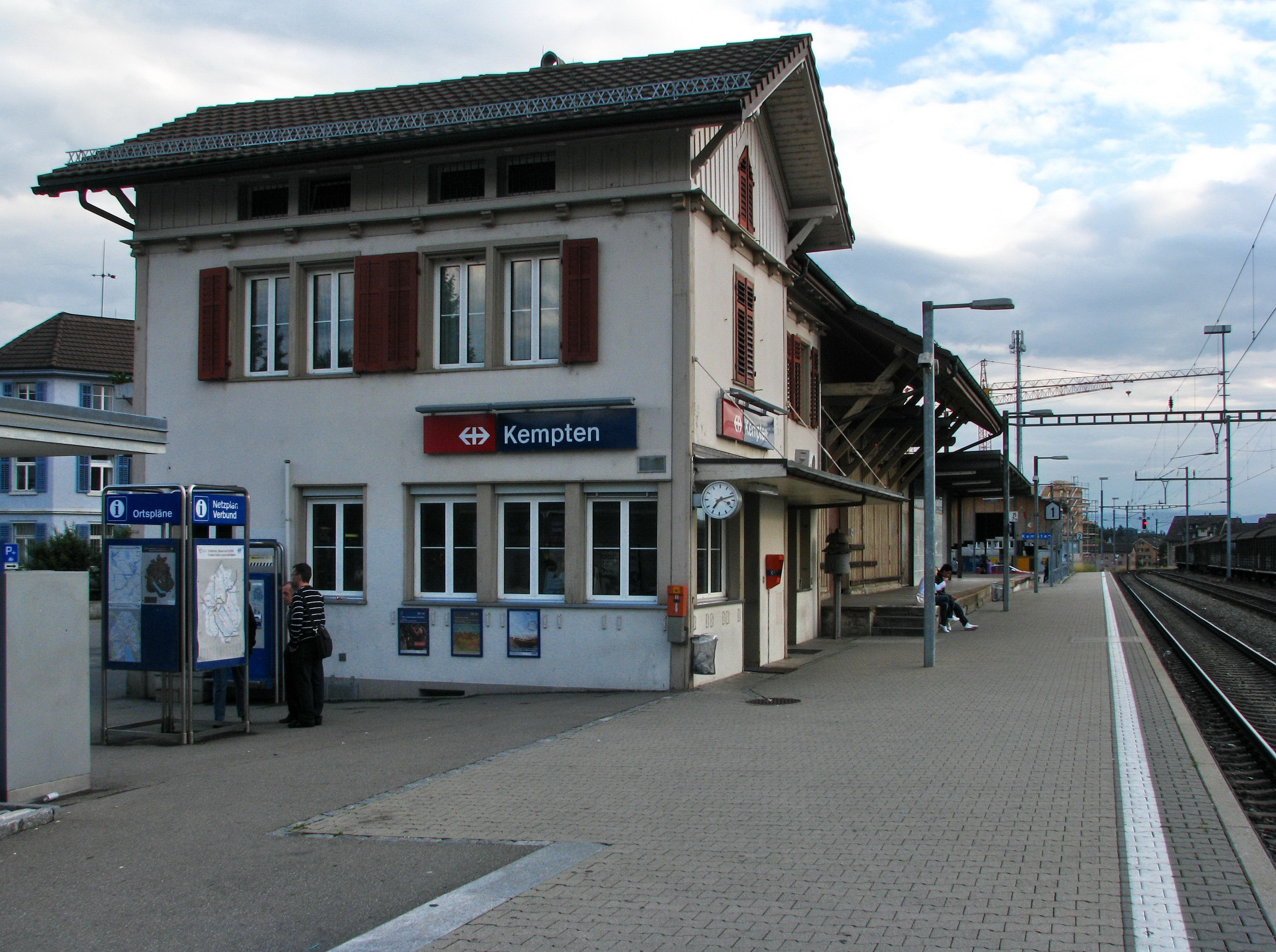
Kempten train station

Kempten is a locality of the municipality of Wetzikon in the canton of Zurich in Switzerland.

== Geography ==
Kempten is located in the district of Hinwil in the Zürcher Oberland nearby the southeastern shore of the Pfäffikersee (Lake Pfäffikon).

== Demographics ==
Kempten belongs politically to the municipality of Wetzikon.

== Transportation ==
Kempten railway station is a stop of the S-Bahn Zürich on the line S3. The train station was built in 1903. The bus line operator Verkehrsbetriebe Zürichsee und Oberland (VZO) provides its services for the regions of the Oberland and the upper northeastern Lake Zurich shore.

== Points of interest ==
In Kempten (lat. Cambodunum), the remains of a Roman villa rustica were found, which was located close to the Irgenhausen Castrum. In addition, the so-called Malermuseum (lit. 'painter museum') is situated in Kempten.
