= Irgenhausen Castrum =

Former Roman fort in Irgenhausen, Switzerland

Irgenhausen Castrum (Kleinkastell Irgenhausen)
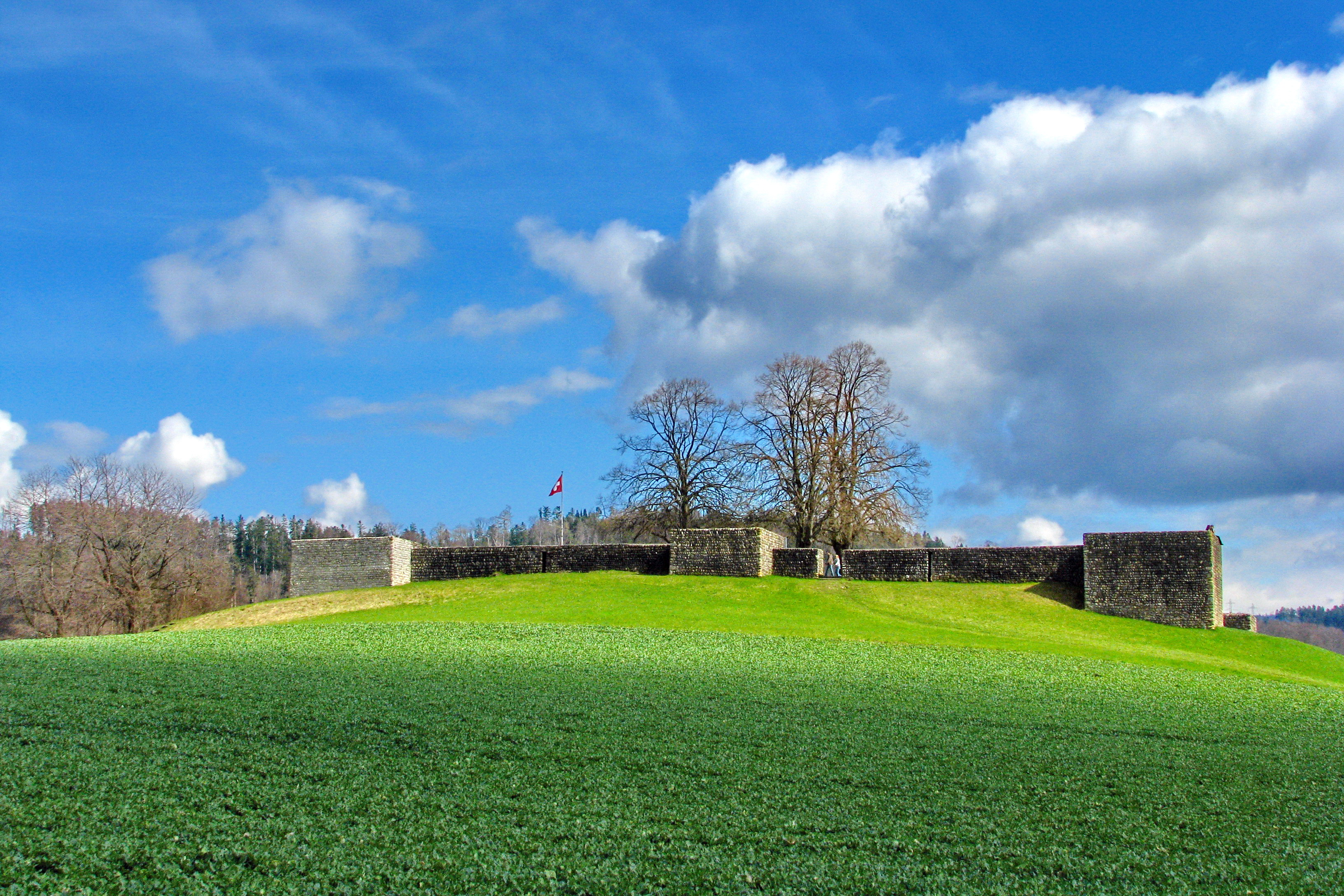
- The Castrum as seen from the west
- Alternative name: unknown
- Limes: Danube-Iller-Rhine Limes (Maxima Sequanorum, rearward line)
- Date(s) occupied: Valentinian II, 4th to 5th century
- Type: road respectively hill castle
- Unit/Formation: unknown
- Size: 60 metres (197 ft)× 61 metres (200 ft) (0.36 hectares (0.9 acres))
- Construction: stone construction
- Condition: completely excavated, conserved and partly reconstructed
- Location: Irgenhausen, Canton of Zürich, Switzerland
- Coordinates: 47.358333°N 8.7925°E
- Height: 562 m
- Previous fort: Turicum Castrum (Turicum) (west)
- Fort in front: Vitudurum Castrum (Vitudurum) (north)

Irgenhausen Castrum is a Roman fort at Irgenhausen, situated on Pfäffikersee lake shore in Switzerland. It was a square fort, measuring 60 metres (197 ft) in square, with four corner towers and three additional towers. The remains of a stone wall in the interior were probably a spa. Built to secure a Roman road, the fort was evacuated and destroyed by Alamanni invaders around AD 400.

== Geography ==
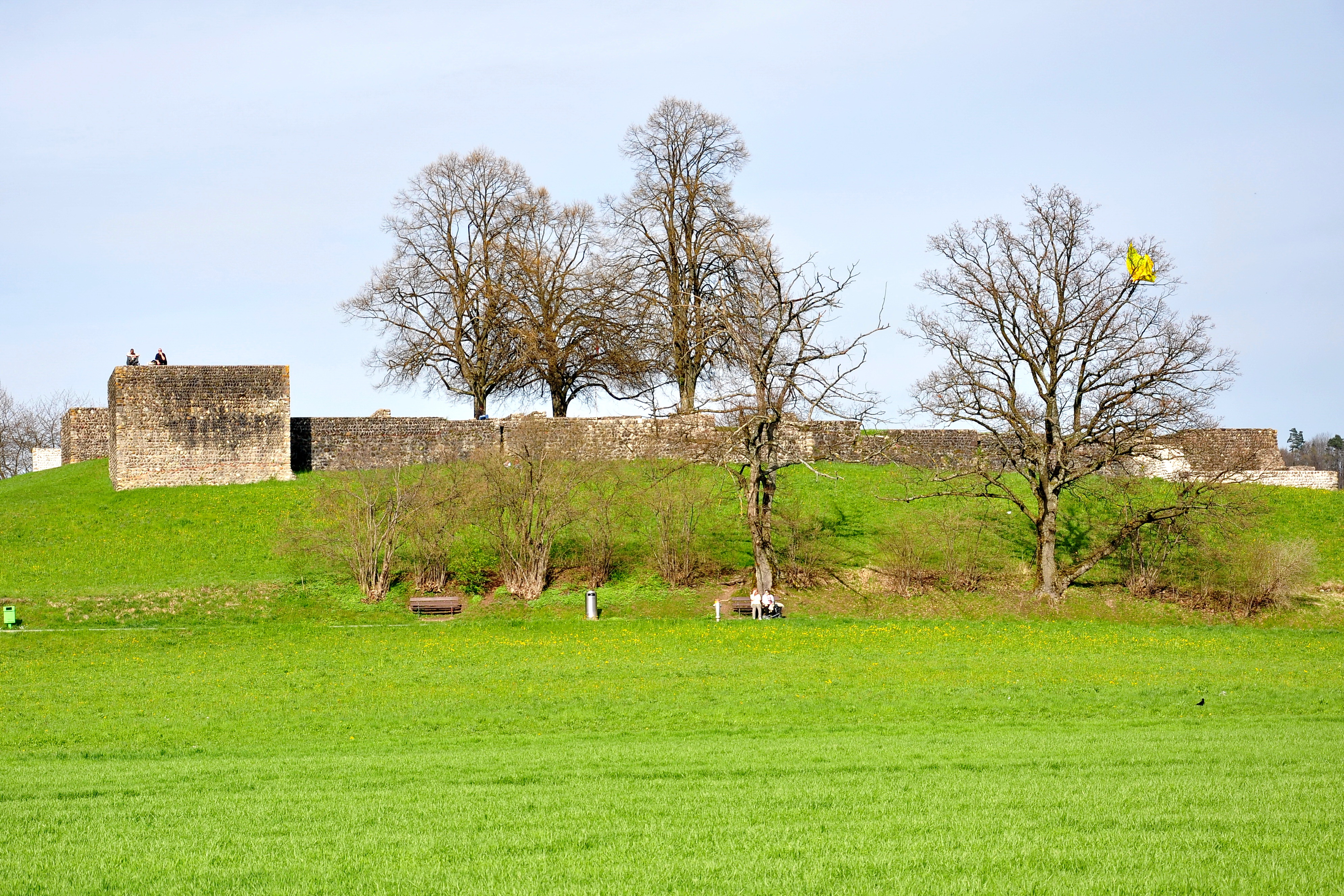
As seen from the south

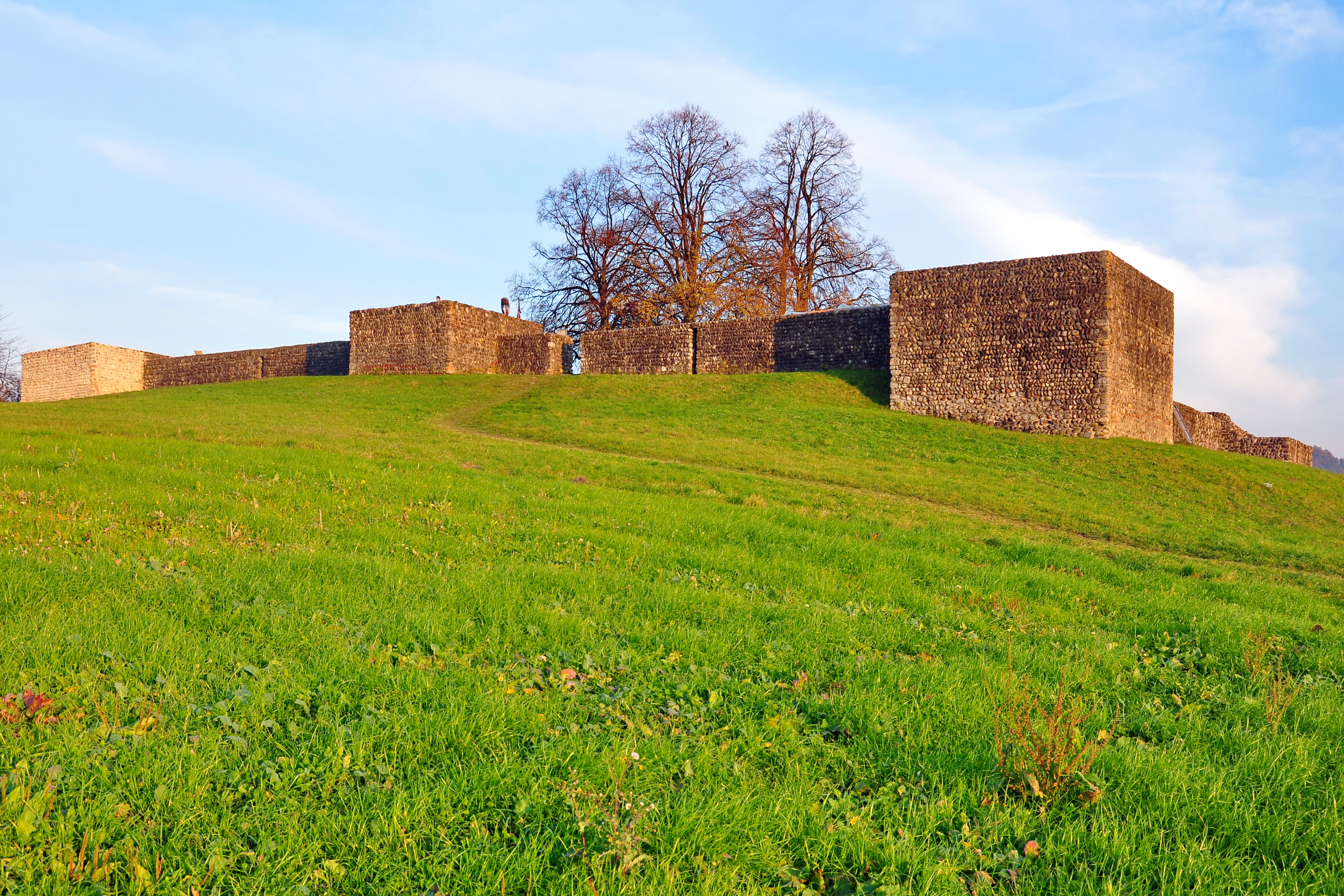
As seen from the northwest

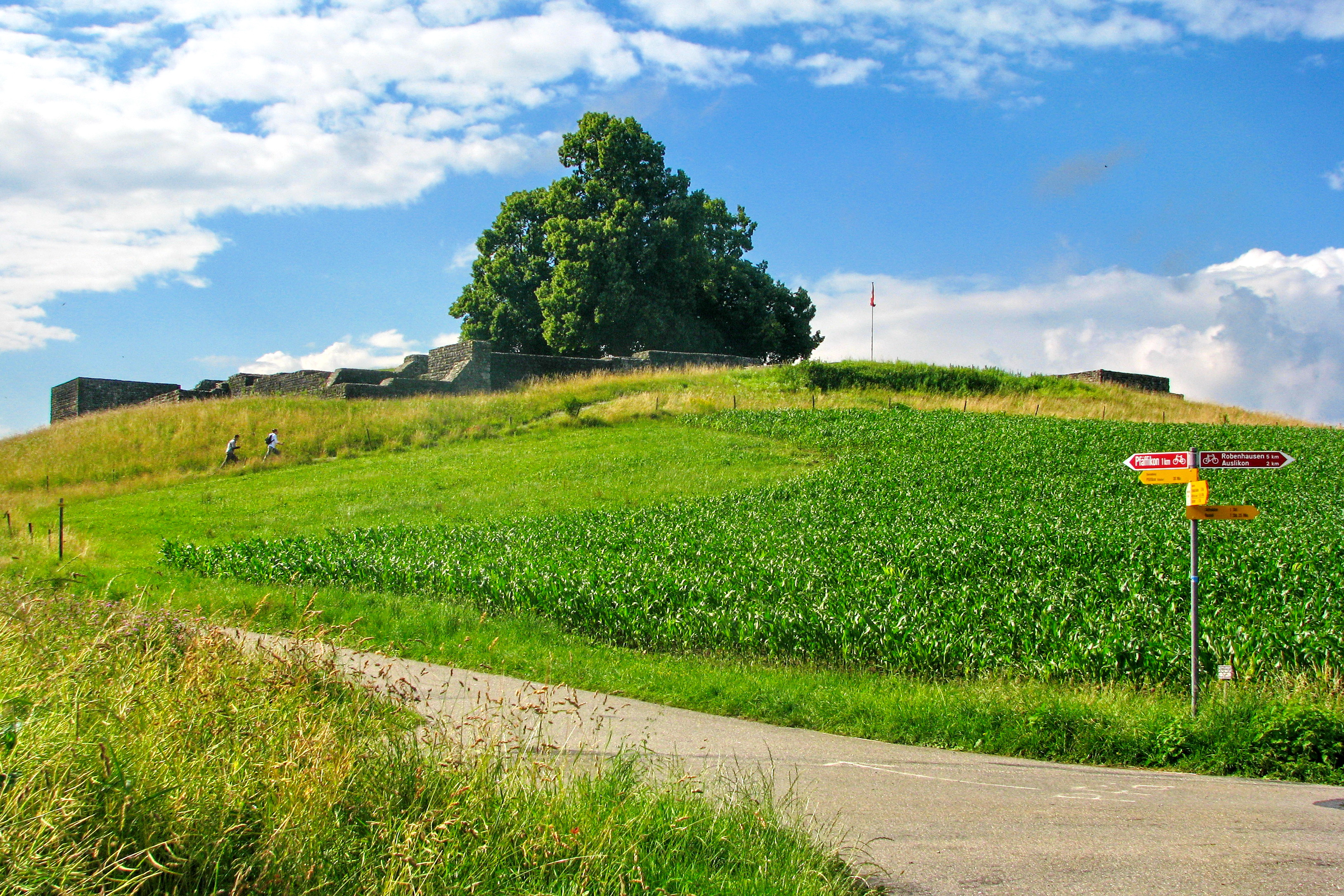
As seen from the southeast

The castrum is situated on the Bürglen hill in Irgenhausen, a village of the municipality of Pfäffikon in the canton of Zürich in Switzerland. Bürglen (Swiss German: "small castle") is a 25 metres (82 ft) high drumlin, 400 metres (1,312 ft) from the eastern shore of Pfäffikersee, situated between Pfäffikon and Kempten, the site of another Roman settlement nearby.

== History ==
In the Roman era, along Pfäffikersee there was a Roman road from Centum Prata (Kempraten) on Obersee–Lake Zürich via Vitudurum (Oberwinterthur) to Tasgetium (Eschenz) on the Rhine. To secure this important transport route, the castrum was built. The native name of the fort is unknown; Irgenhausen was mentioned in AD 811 as Camputuna sive Irincheshusa, so maybe the castrum's name was Cambodunum, the Roman name of the neighboring village of Kempten.

In 1865, Jakob Messikommer succeeded the dating of finds at Irgenhausen, because of his experience in the dating of peat and concurrent findings at the Irgenhausen Castrum. In 1897, stones of the ruined building (believed at the time to be those of a medieval castle) were used for the construction of a factory nearby; the dilapidation was stopped by the Antiquarische Gesellschaft in Zürich in order to start archaeological investigations, carried out between 1898 and 1908, and to preserve the walls. The castrum was set under federal protection as "Kastell Irgenhausen" in 1909. Walter Mittelholzer made an aerial exploration of the fort and the surrounding area, whereupon in the closer environment Roman villae rusticae, among them one in Kempten, were localized and excavated. In 1957, the land and the castle were sold to the community of Pfäffikon.

== Architecture ==
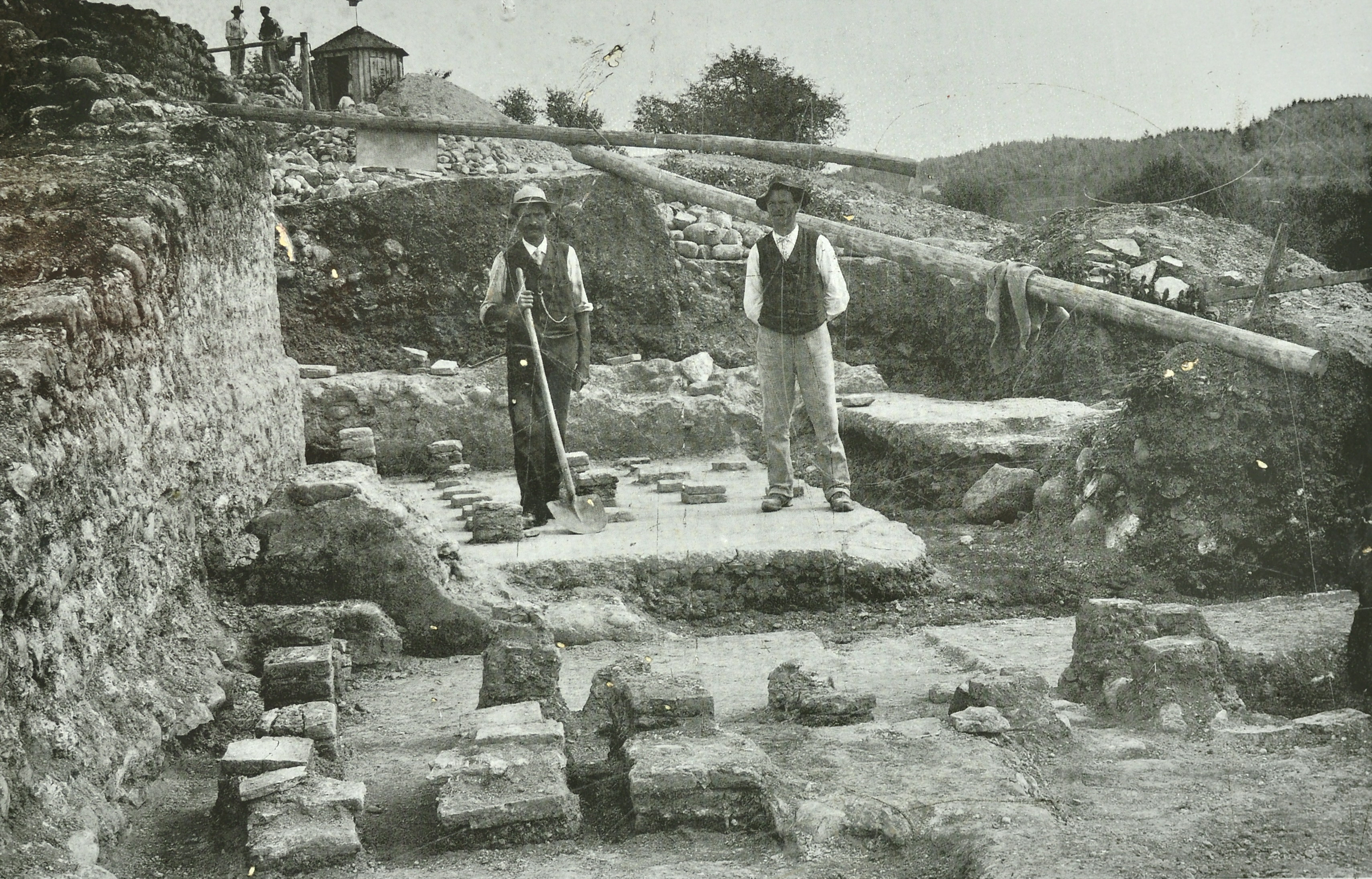
Excavations in 1907 showing the hypocaustum of the villa rustica, with the castle wall to the left

For the dating of the fort there are two theories: the first assumes that the fort was built at the time of the Emperor Diocletian around AD 294–295. The other theory, based on the Roman coins found inside the castrum, dated the construction from 364 to 375, in the era of the Emperor Valentinian II. As early as AD 400 the castrum was evacuated and destroyed by Alamanni invaders.

The excavations restored a 1.4 metres (5 ft) high foundation wall that has an almost square outline of 60 metres (197 ft) x 61 metres (200 ft), and thus an area of only 0.366 hectares. The fort had four corner towers (8 metres (26 ft) x 8 metres (26 ft)), a gate tower on the southeast side and three low towers on the north, west and south front (6 metres (20 ft)), and an approximately 1.9 metres (6 ft) strong enclosing wall. The materials used by the Roman soldiers derived from glacial deposits, furthermore, there is a mixture of sernifit from Glarus, limestone and conglomerate. The walls of the towers measure between 1.2 metres (4 ft) up to 1.4 metres (5 ft). The main access was from the south through the gate in the middle of the eastern front. The other three sides hide small side entrances.

In addition to the remains of the towers and surrounding wall, there were found the remains of stone interior buildings: a three-roomed building was seen as a spa. Another building with three rooms has been interpreted as principia, (lit. "primary buildings"), the headquarters of the fort. At the southern corner tower a hypocaust system of an older villa rustica from the 1st to the 3rd century was excavated. The other buildings were made of wood and therefore cannot be individually identified. However, some military barracks, a horreum and a praetorium was probably built inside the fort. In the middle of the hill there was a sunken room. Most of the relics found inside the fort date from the 2nd and 3rd centuries AD and are thought to be relics of the villa rustica on whose ruins the fort was built. At the present time, a red ribbon in the wall shows where the Roman wall ends and the restored wall begins.

== Gallery ==
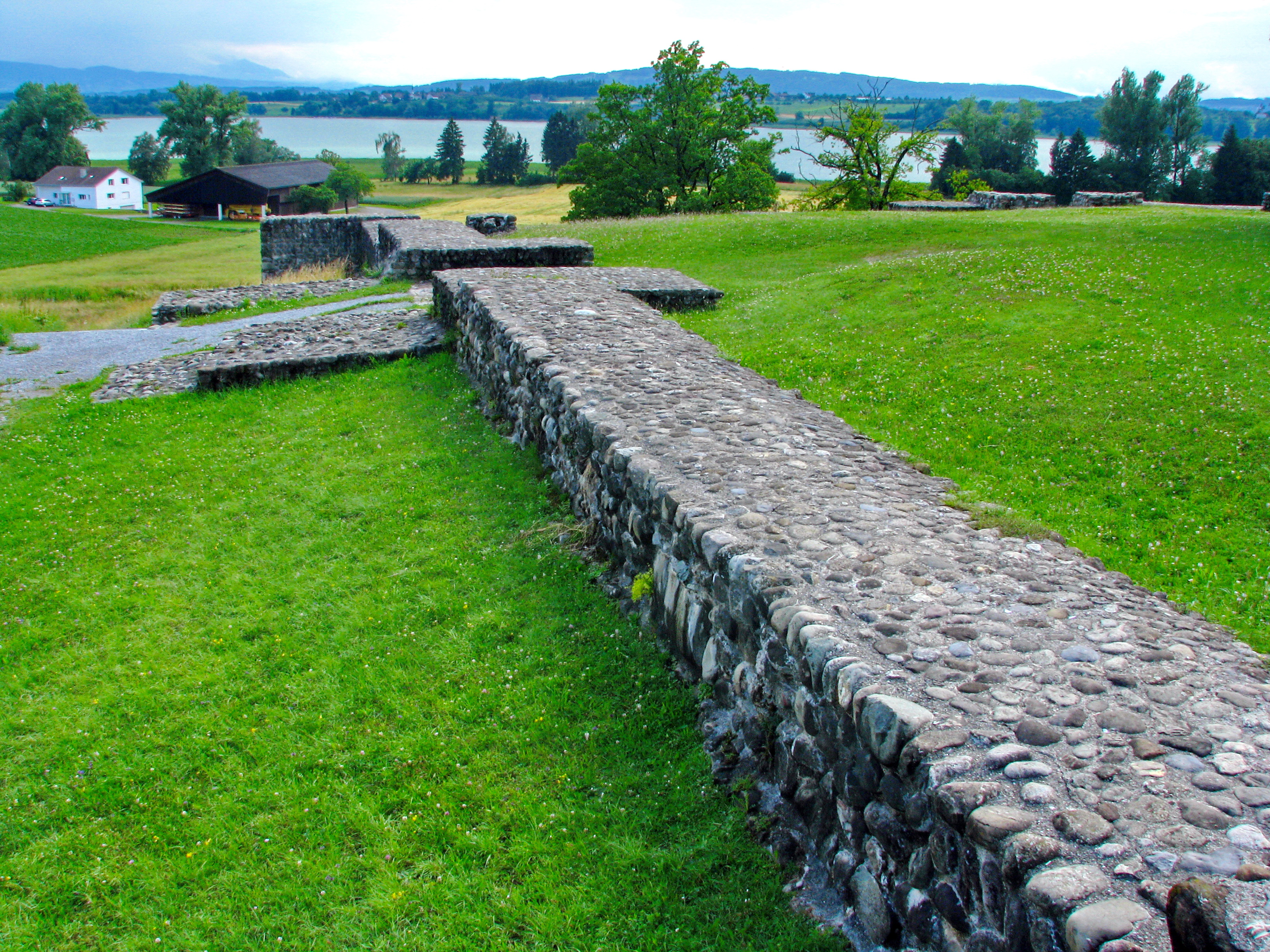
Gate area

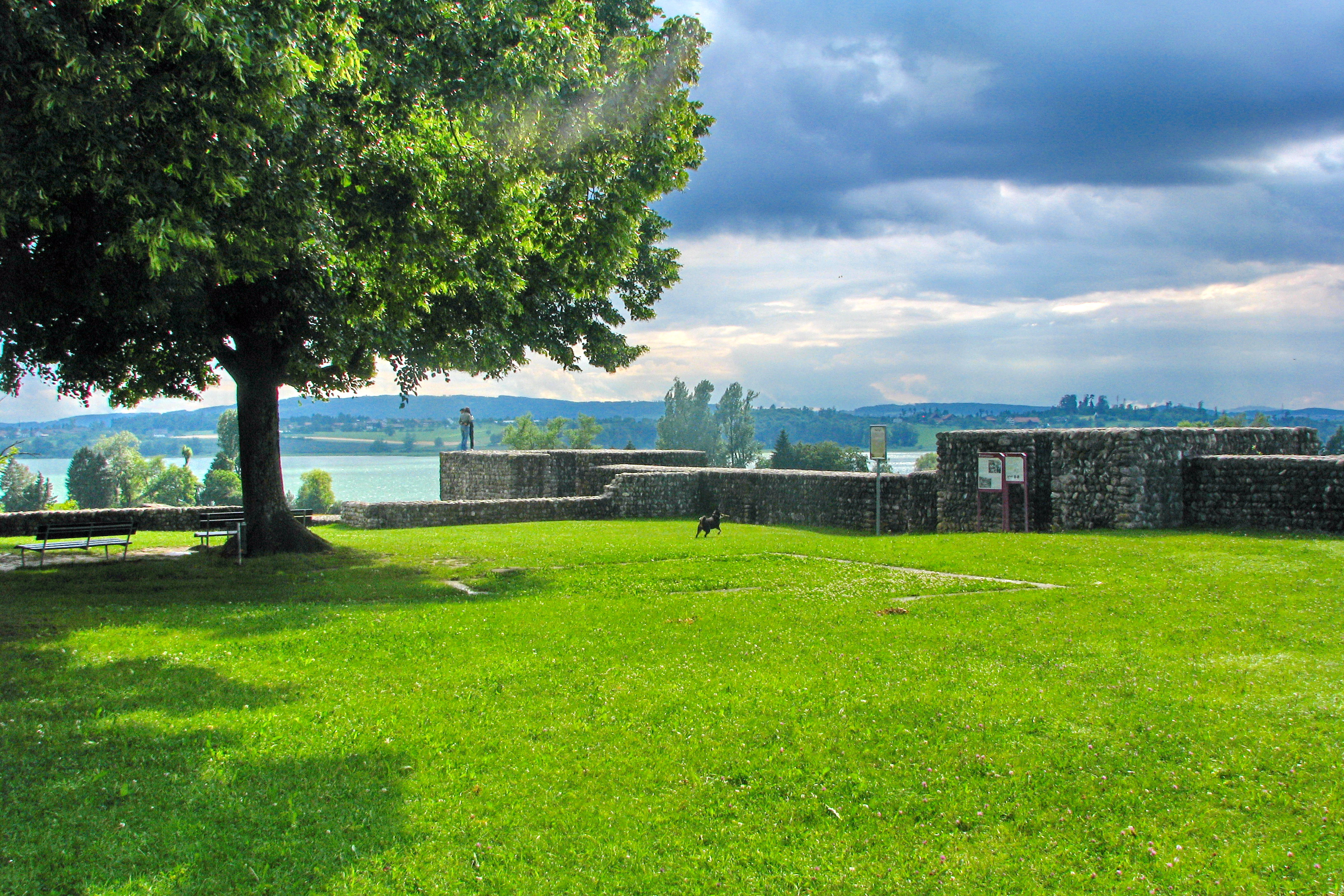
Hill plateau inside the fort, Lake Pfäffikon in the background

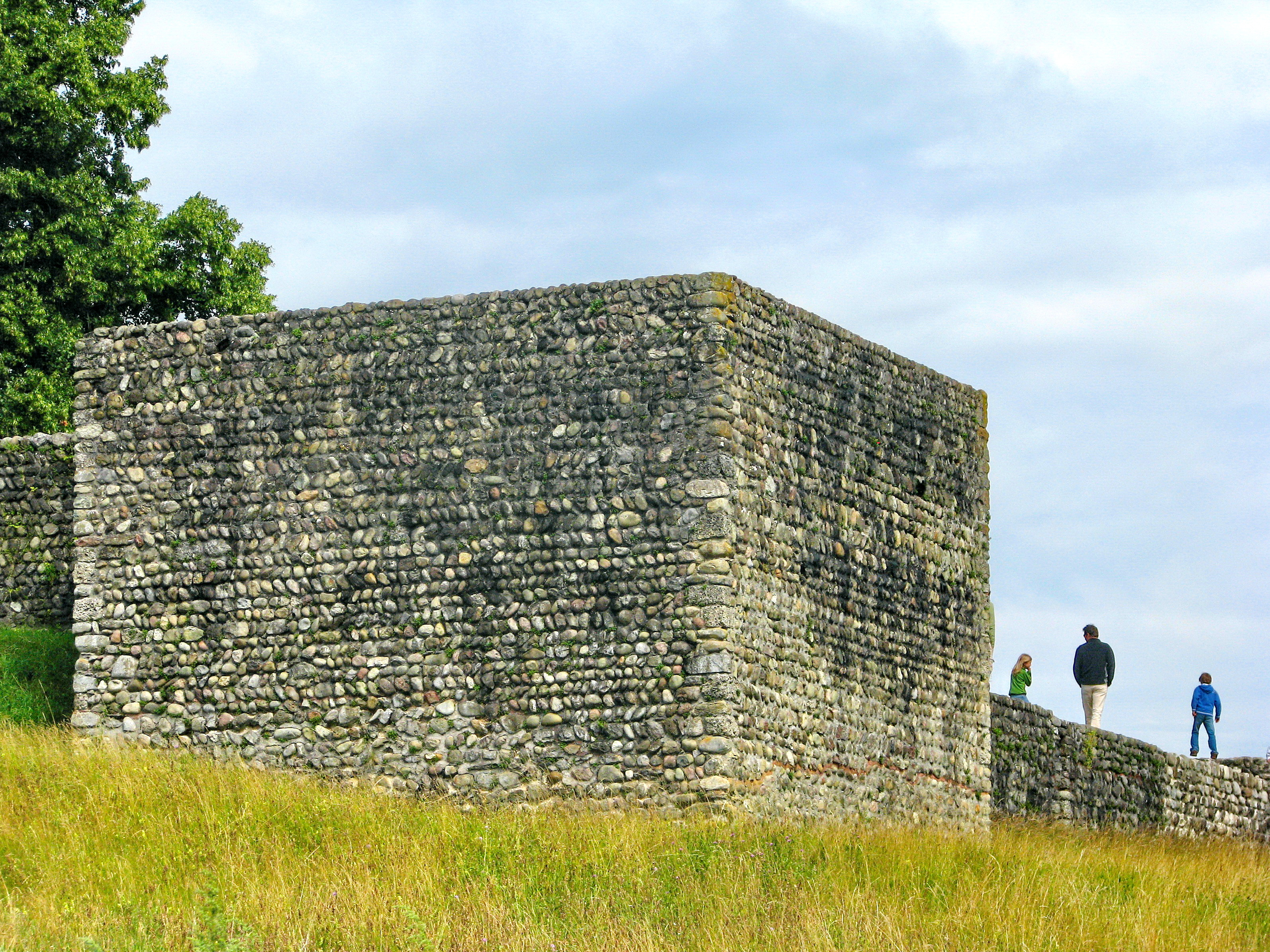
West tower

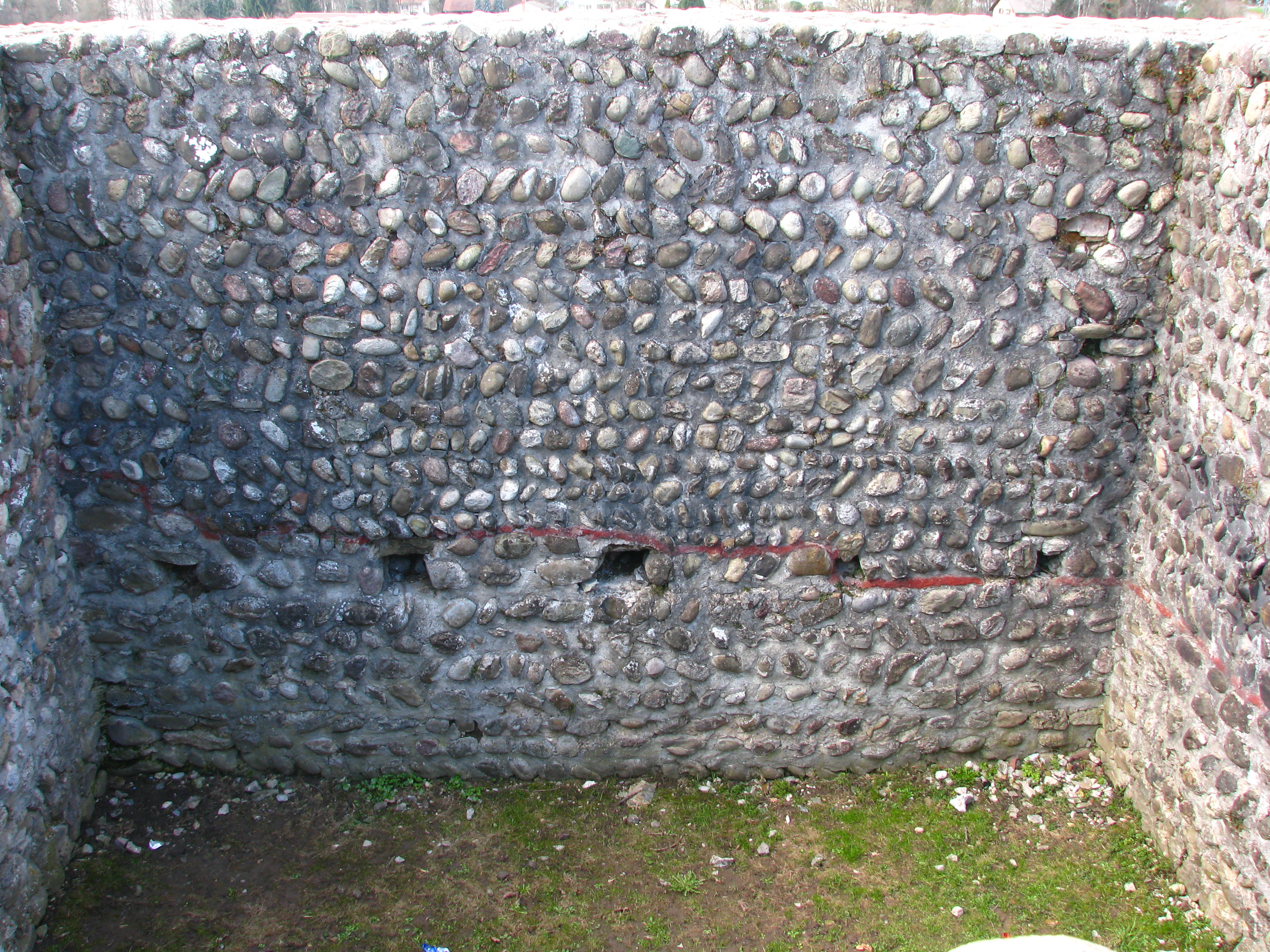
The red ribbon separates the original Roman tower wall from the restored wall

== Cultural heritage ==
The building is listed in the Swiss inventory of cultural property of national and regional significance as a Class B object of regional importance.

== Literature ==
- Beat Horisberger, Bettina Hedinger, Florian Hoek, Roger Büsser: Römisches Landleben im Zürcher Oberland. Huber + Co. AG, Frauenfeld 2007. ISBN 3-7193-1441-3
- Antiquarische Gesellschaft Zürich: Zeitreise: Irgenhausen. Archäologische Entdeckungen rund um das römische Kastell Pfäffikon Irgenhausen: von der Jungsteinzeit bis zu den Ausgrabungen vor hundert Jahren. Zürcher Oberland Buchverlag, Wetzikon 1999. ISBN 3-85981-196-7
