= Auslikon =

Swiss town

- Former municipality
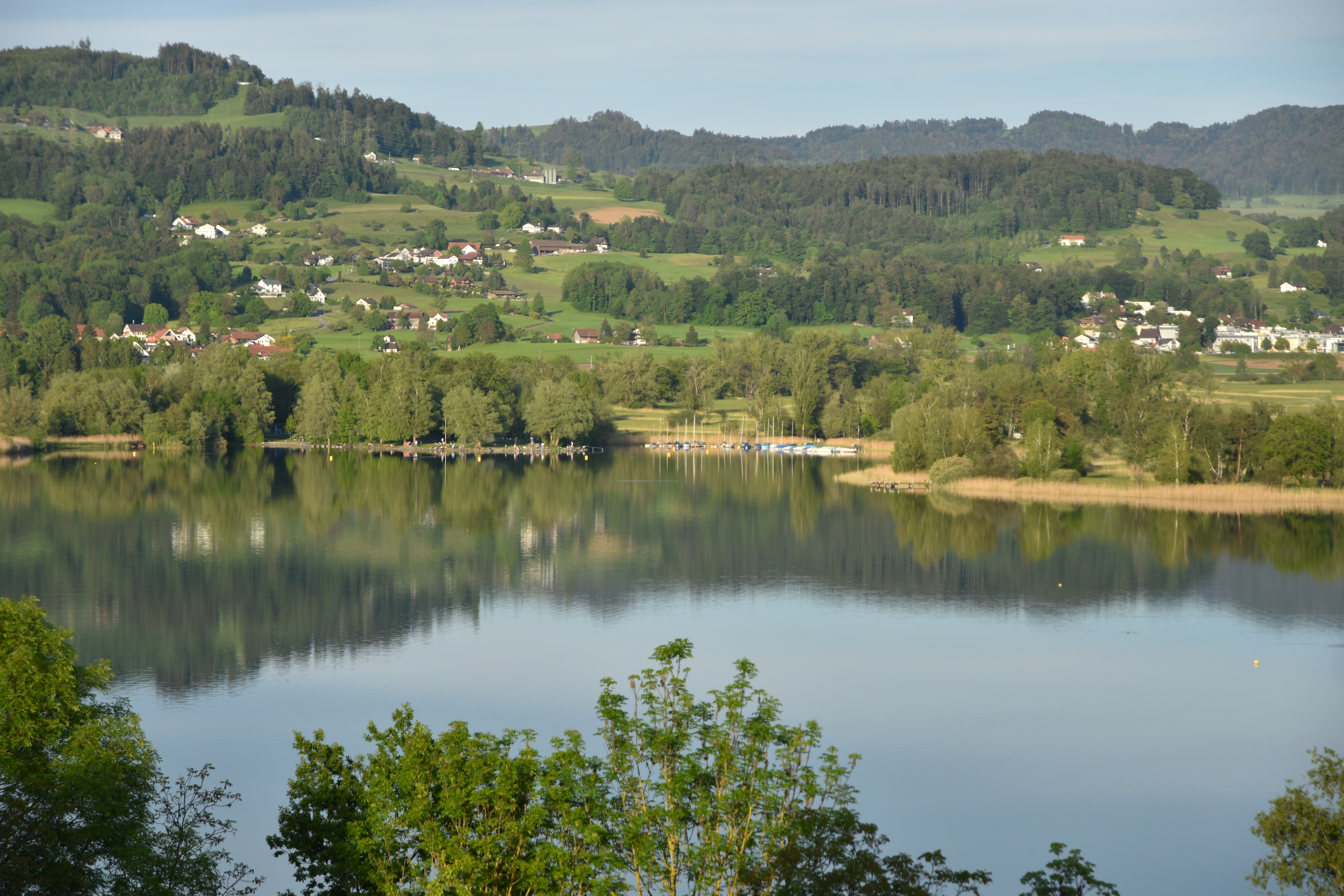
- Auslikon aus seen from the Jucker Farm in Seegräben
- Location of Auslikon
- Location within Switzerland Location within Canton of Zurich
- Coordinates: 47°20.6′N 8°48.4′E
- Country: Switzerland
- Canton: Zurich
- District: Pfäffikon
- Municipality: Pfäffikon
- Elevation: 567 m (1,860 ft)

Population (December 2007)
  - Total: 350
- Time zone: UTC+01:00 (CET)
  - Summer (DST): UTC+02:00 (CEST)
- Postal code: 8331
- ISO 3166 code: CH-ZH
- Surrounded by: Irgenhausen, Kempten, Wetzikon
- Website: www.pfaeffikon.ch

Auslikon is a village (de:Aussenwacht) of the municipality of Pfäffikon in the canton of Zurich in Switzerland. The village occupies a gently shelving terrace on the eastern shore of Pfäffikersee at about 567 m above sea level, approximately 2 km southwest of Pfäffikon and 25 km from central Zurich. Since 1948, both the shoreline and adjoining Ried have been protected under cantonal conservation orders, preserving the natural reedbeds and fen relics that encircle the lake. While historically a farming community with medieval row-farm origins, Auslikon today is primarily oriented toward recreation, featuring a popular lido, nature trails, and connections to nearby archaeological and ornithological sites.

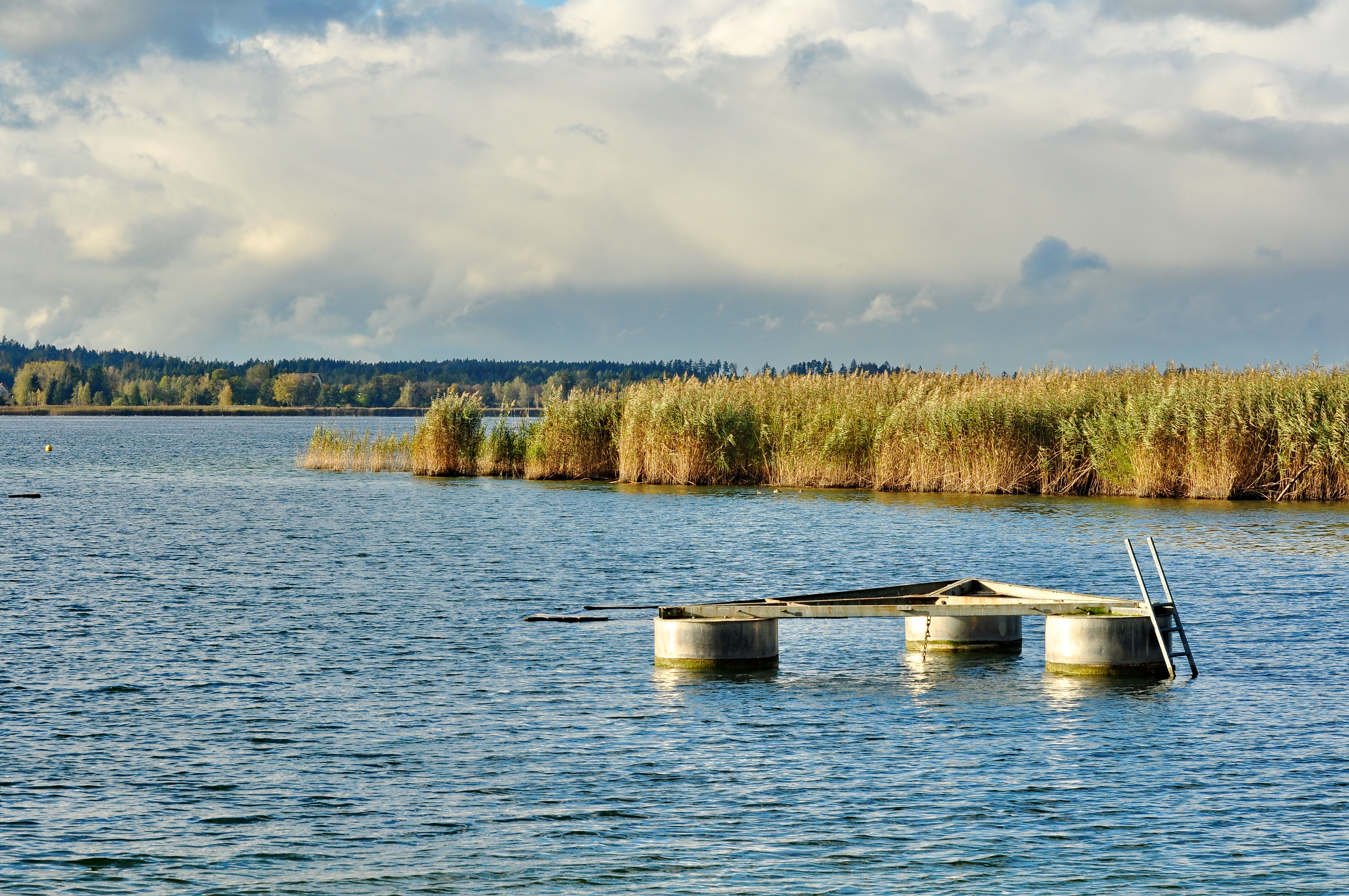
Auslikon lido

== Geography ==
Auslikon occupies a gently shelving terrace on the eastern shore of the Pfäffikersee at about 567 m above sea level, 2 km south-west of the district capital Pfäffikon and 25 km from central Zürich. Although administratively a hamlet of Pfäffikon, it retains its own postcode (8331) and counted roughly 350 inhabitants in 2023, which corresponds to roughly 100 inhabitants per square kilometre; most live in a ribbon of lake-side cottages threaded between orchard strips and smallholdings. The settlement forms the south-eastern tip of a chain of protected reedbeds and fen relics encircling the lake; since 1948 both the shoreline and the adjoining Ried have been safeguarded under a cantonal conservation order that prohibits building beyond the existing village fringe. A lakeside footpath links Auslikon with the neolithic pile-dwellings at Irgenhausen in the north and the ornithological observation towers near Seegräben in the south.

== History ==
First recorded around 1310 as "Uslikon", the hamlet was then part of the Greifensee bailiwick held jointly by the Rapperswil counts and the Breitenlandenberg family; Zürich acquired the low-court rights in 1402 and retained them until the Helvetic upheavals of 1798. Auslikon’s linear plan still betrays its mediaeval row-farm (flarz) origins, when dairy-cum-arable plots were strung out along the lakeside road with communal pasture behind.

A single-room schoolhouse was erected in 1811, replacing lessons that had been held in a farmhouse parlour. In 1928 the hamlet, together with Ober- and Unter-Balm, relinquished its remaining civic autonomy and joined the modern political municipality of Pfäffikon.

== Recreation and modern economy ==
Recreation now dominates the local economy. The Strandbad Auslikon, developed by the Wetzikon tourist board in 1927 and purchased by that municipality in 1964, offers a 150-m shingle beach, playgrounds and SUP hire; its adjacent 65-pitch campsite is scheduled for closure after 2023 because it lies inside the marsh core zone and no longer meets the mobility-and-environment guidelines for the lake basin. Auslikon also became home to the landscape painter Arnold W. Brunner (1909–1972), whose canvases of lowland moors and glacial hillsides have shaped popular imagery of the Zürcher Oberland.

== Points of interest ==
In Auslikon there is a popular lido and a camping site, within the nature reserve on the Pfäffikersee lake shore.
