= Vitudurum =

Former Roman Vicus in Switzerland

- Vitodorum
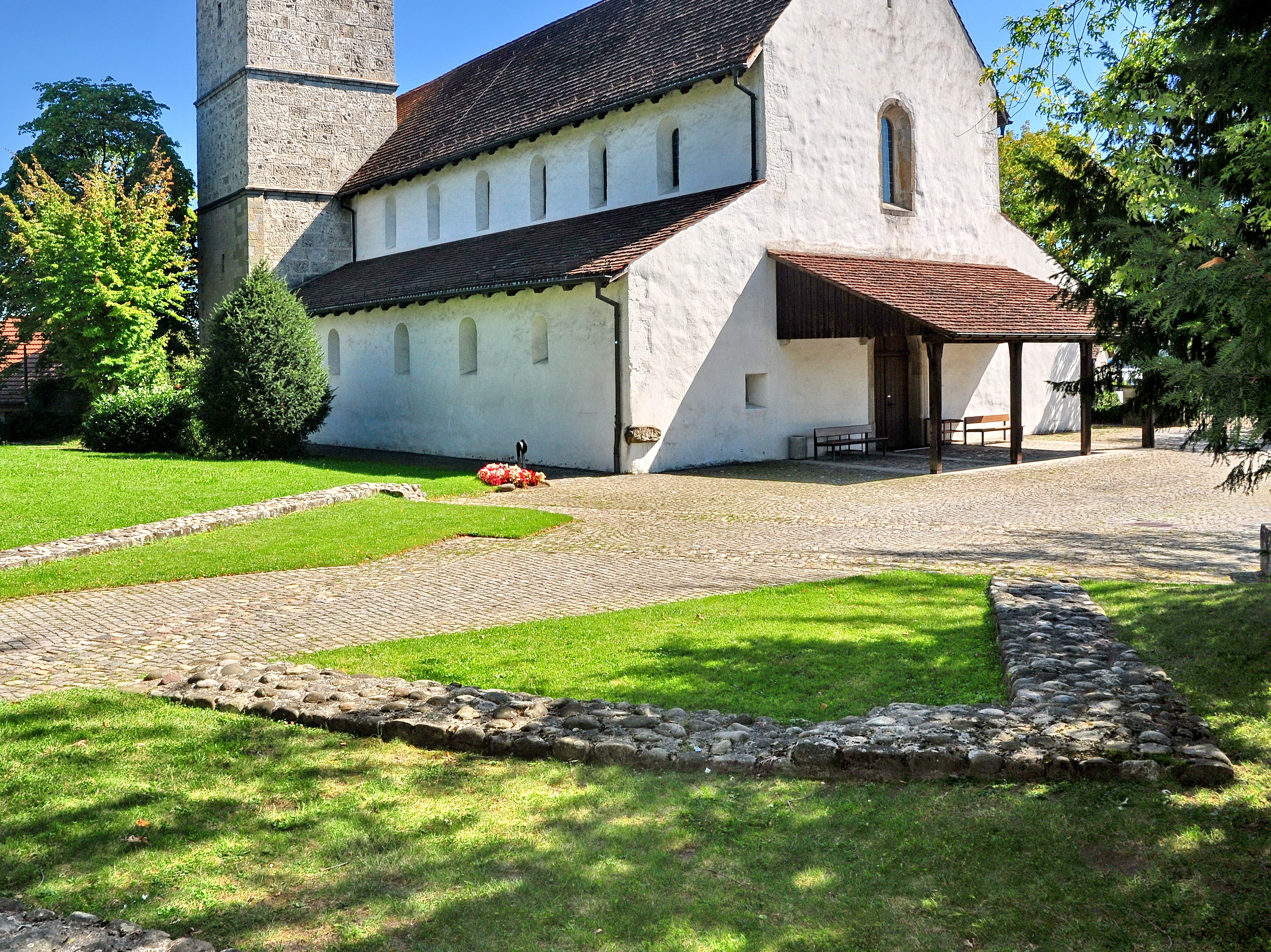
- St. Arbogast church in Oberwinterthur and the foundation walls at the site of the Roman castle

- Location within Switzerland
- 47°30′0″N 8°44′00″E
- Type: Vicus
- Periods: Roman Republic to Roman Empire
- Cultures: Gallo-Roman
- Location: Oberwinterthur
- Region: former Germania Superior, present municipality of Winterthur, Canton of Zürich, Switzerland

History
- Built: around 4 BC
- Abandoned: Around 401 AD by the Roman army, settlement continued by Gallo-Roman inhabitants

Site notes
- Material: stone and wood
- Condition: aeaorchological access
- Owner: City of Winterthur
- Management: Canton of Zürich
- Public access: Foundation walls at the St. Arbogast church

Vitudurum (sometimes Vitodorum) was a Roman vicus, whose remains are located in Oberwinterthur, a locality of the municipality of Winterthur in the canton of Zürich in Switzerland.

== Geography ==
The majority of the remains of commercial, residential, religious and public buildings are situated in Oberwinterthur, a locality of the municipality of Winterthur, around the St. Arbogast church, at Unterer Bühl, Kastellweg and Bätmur Flur.

== Location ==
Vitudurum was established nearby productive resources and a prehistoric route from Lake Geneva to Lake Constance (Arbor Felix, Brigantium) in the late first century BC or early first century AD. It was located at the probably route leading to the north (Ad Fines, Tasgetium), presumably also towards Turicum, and towards the Irgenhausen Castrum and Centum Prata (Kempraten), and on the water transport route Obersee–Linth–Walensee on the Gotthard Pass route towards the Roman heartland in Italy.

== History ==
The Roman timber buildings were dendrochronologically dated around 4 BC. In AD 7 the Romans rebuilt the passageway in the Oberwinterthur area into a road. Starting from the village's center on the church hill (St. Arbogast) at the beginning of the 1st century AD, a street village stretched at a length of about 500 metres (1,640 ft) having several insulae. The open settlement had its flowering time in the 1st and 2nd centuries. During the Alemanni invasion, the vicus was replaced respectively fortified by a castrum (fort) on the present St. Arbogast church hill, surrounded by a wall. The date of the construction of the fortification around 294 AD is documented by its inscription stone. At the same place the predecessor building of the St. Arbogast church was erected in the 6th/7th century.

== Buildings and infrastructure ==
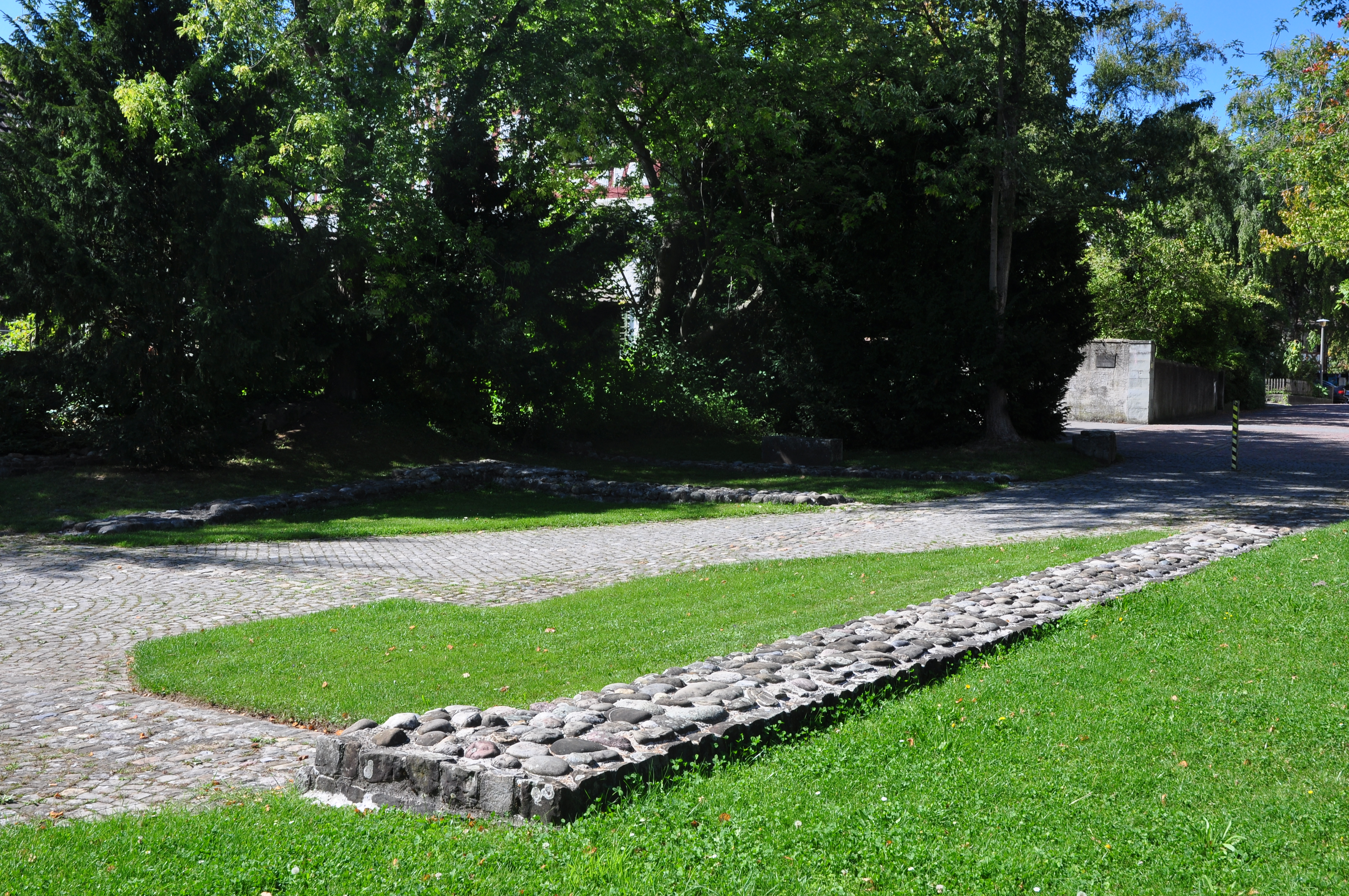
Roman wall remains at the Reformed Church of St. Arbogast

A masonry temple in the center was built in the 1st to 2nd century, surrounded by a sacred precinct, the spa, three houses and a building of public character, and on the opposite side other larger stone buildings. To the south east, a residential and commercial district were situated at Unterer Bühl, which consisted entirely of wooden houses or clay-half-timbered structures. There were found organic materials in a very good condition: besides basket fragments, scrap leather and wooden objects, also a threshold beam and other parts of the house structures. About a wooden spring capture and wooden (so-called Teuchel) fresh water pipes were conducted in different houses. Elaborately constructed and parcarefully covered wooden channels were used for sanitation.

Comparable with the southwestern area, two rows of houses stretched towards the north-east. North of the church hill (Kastellweg) there were on 2,000 square metres (21,528 ft^{2}) more residential and farm buildings made of wood, but also one of stone, fresh water pipes and sewers and latrines, established in the 1st to the 3rd century AD. Fire hazard exposed buildings and imissionary trades were situated at the edges of settlement in the west and east: in the 1st and 2nd centuries at least 14 kilns and tanneries in the southwest and northeast. Individual staves of six vats, embedded in the floor of the tannery date back in the 1st century, and show bear stamp and graffiti. The numerous single finds, mostly from the 1st century, include wooden writing tablets with inscriptions, pottery fragments and a pair of shoe bars.

== Archaeological exploration ==
After the first excavations in 1841 and 1853, soundings at the location of the castrum at the St. Arbogast church and in the immediate vicinity have been done in 1934. On occasion of the rebuilding of the parish house Oberwinterthur, a rescue excavation was carried out from 1949 to 1951. In 1957/59 followed excavations and research and in 1960 further excavations. On the Roman road on the northeastern end of the Vicus excavations were carried out in 1967/69, and in 1976 at the St. Arbogast church, and from 1977 to 1982 on the lower western district (Unterer Bühl) of the settlement. Between 1979 and 2010 all construction projects were monitored in the area of the Roman Vicus, and over 50 rescue excavations were carried out; especially in 2002 at Bätmur Flur the aerchologists explored an early to high medieval settlement area (7th to 12th century AD), and from 2006 to 2009 at Kastellweg. In the area of the Vicus settlement remains of the European Neolithic, the early and late Bronze Age and grave remains of the Middle Bronze Age and the early Iron Age were uncovered. Rescue excavations were executed in late summer 2015, discovering the foundation holes of seven pit-houses from the 6th century in Hegmatten. Individual finds include glass beads and knife blades, but also various Roman coins, two Roman finger rings and parts of several Roman fibulae. The excavations of 2015 were continued in spring 2016.

== Name and inscription stone ==
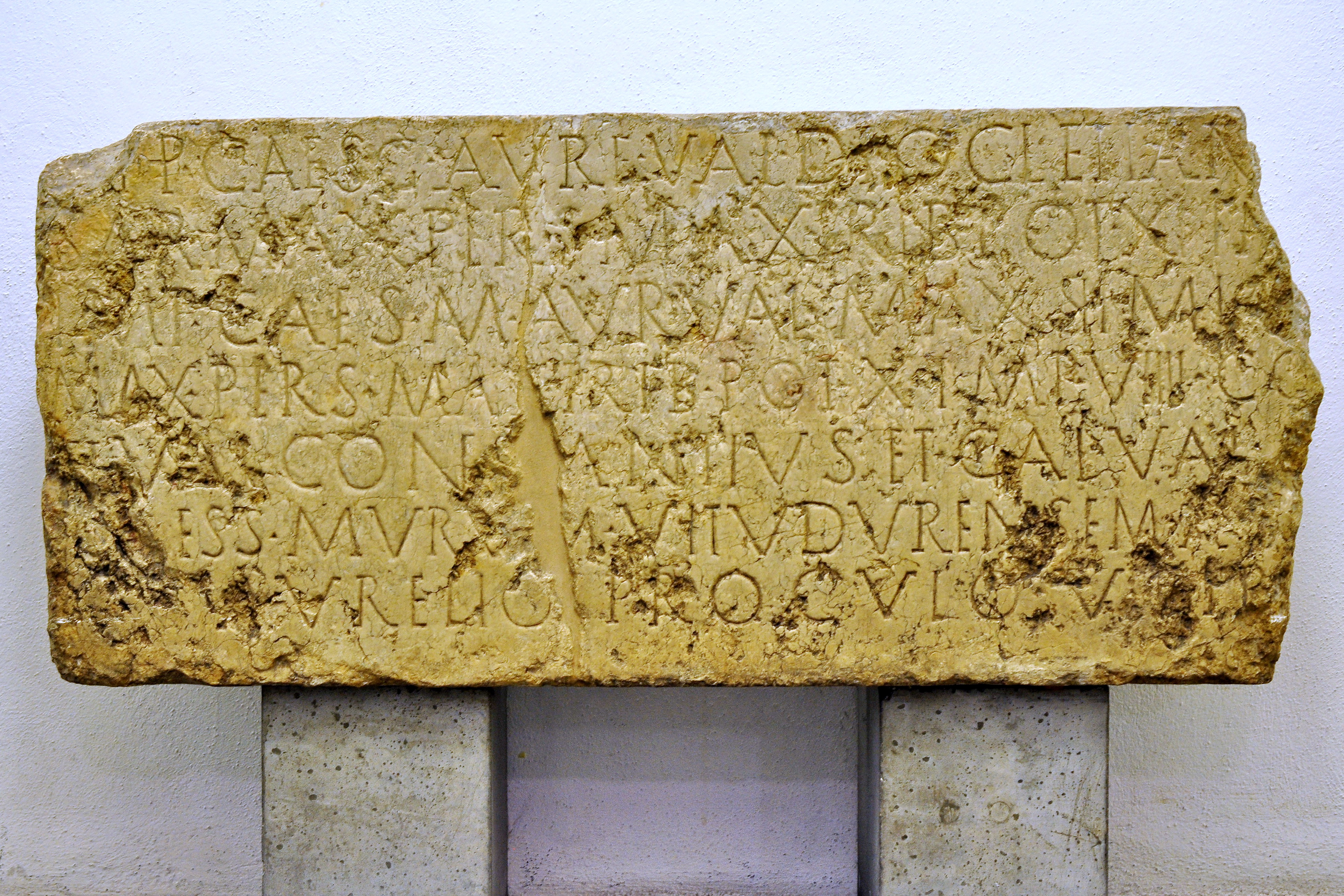
Foundation stone of the castle Vitudurum dated back to 294 AD

The name Vitudurum is evidenced by the Latin inscription on the foundation stone of the castle in the former Roman province Germania Superior dating in 294 AD:

[I]MP(erator) CAES(ar) G(aius) AURE(lius) VAL(erius) DIOCLETIAN[US PONT(ifex) MAX(imus) GER(manicus) MAX(imus)
SAR(maticus) MAX(imus) PERS(icus) MAX(imus) TRIB(unicia) POT(estate) XI IM[P(erator)x CO(n)S(ul) V P(ater) P(atriae) PROCO(n)S(ul) ET
IMP(erator) CAES(ar) M(arcus) AUR(elius) VAL(erius) MAXIMIA[N(us) PONT(ifex) MAX(imus) GER(manicus) MAX(imus) SAR(maticus)
MAX(imus) PERS(icus) MA[X(imus) TRIB(unicia) POT(estate) X IMP(erator) VIIII CO[(n)S(ul) IIII P(ater) P(atriae) PROCO(n)S(ul) P(ii) F(elices) INV(icti) AUG(usti)
ET VAL(erius) CONS[T]ANTIU ET GAL(erius) VAL(erius) [MAXSIMIANUS NOBILISS(imi) CA]ES(are)S MURUM VITUDURENSEM A S[OLO] SUMPTU SUO FECER(unt)
AURELIO PROCULO V(iro) P(erfectissimo) PR[AES(ide) PROV(inciae) CURANTE]

The original Latin inscription was written in shortened form (capitals, above). Completing the words gives the meaning:

The Emperor Gaius Aurelius Valerius Diocletian, the greatest German conqueror, the greatest Sarmatians conqueror, the greatest Persian conqueror, proclaimed in the 11th year of his tribunician power, for the tenth time as the champion, consul for the fifth time, father of the fatherland, the proconsul, the pious, happy, victorious emperor, and Valerius Constantius and Galerius Valerius Maximianus, in the illustrious reign of the emperor have built the fort wall of Vitudurum from scratch at their expense under the supervision of Aurelius Proculus, the highly respected provincial governor.

The inscription stone is exhibited in the old city of Winterthur at the Rathaus Winterthur.

== Heritage site of national significance ==
The area of the remains of the Vicus Vitudurm ist listed in the Swiss inventory of cultural property of national and regional significance as Class A object of national importance. Hence, the area is provided as a historical site under federal protection, within the meaning of the Swiss Federal Act on the nature and cultural heritage (German: Bundesgesetz über den Natur- und Heimatschutz NHG) of 1 July 1966. Unauthorised researching and purposeful gathering of findings represent a criminal offense according to Art. 24.

== Namesake ==
- Asteroid 398045 Vitudurum

== Literature ==
- Jürg E. Schneider, Walter Ulrich Guyan, Andreas Zürcher: Turicum, Vitudurum, Iuliomagus = Zürich, Winterthur und Schleitheim: drei römische Siedlungen in der Ostschweiz. Ergänzte Sonderauflage, Werd-Verlag, Zürich 1988, ISBN 3-8593-2002-5.
- Vitudurum. Beiträge zum römischen Oberwinterthur, Volumes 1–9, published by Kantonsarchäologie Zürich, 1984–2001.
- Schweizerische Gesellschaft für Ur- und Frühgeschichte (Publisher), SPM V. Römische Zeit (2002) p. 403–404.
