= Aatal =

Valley in the canton of Zürich, Switzerland

Coordinates: 47.3401°N 8.7572°E

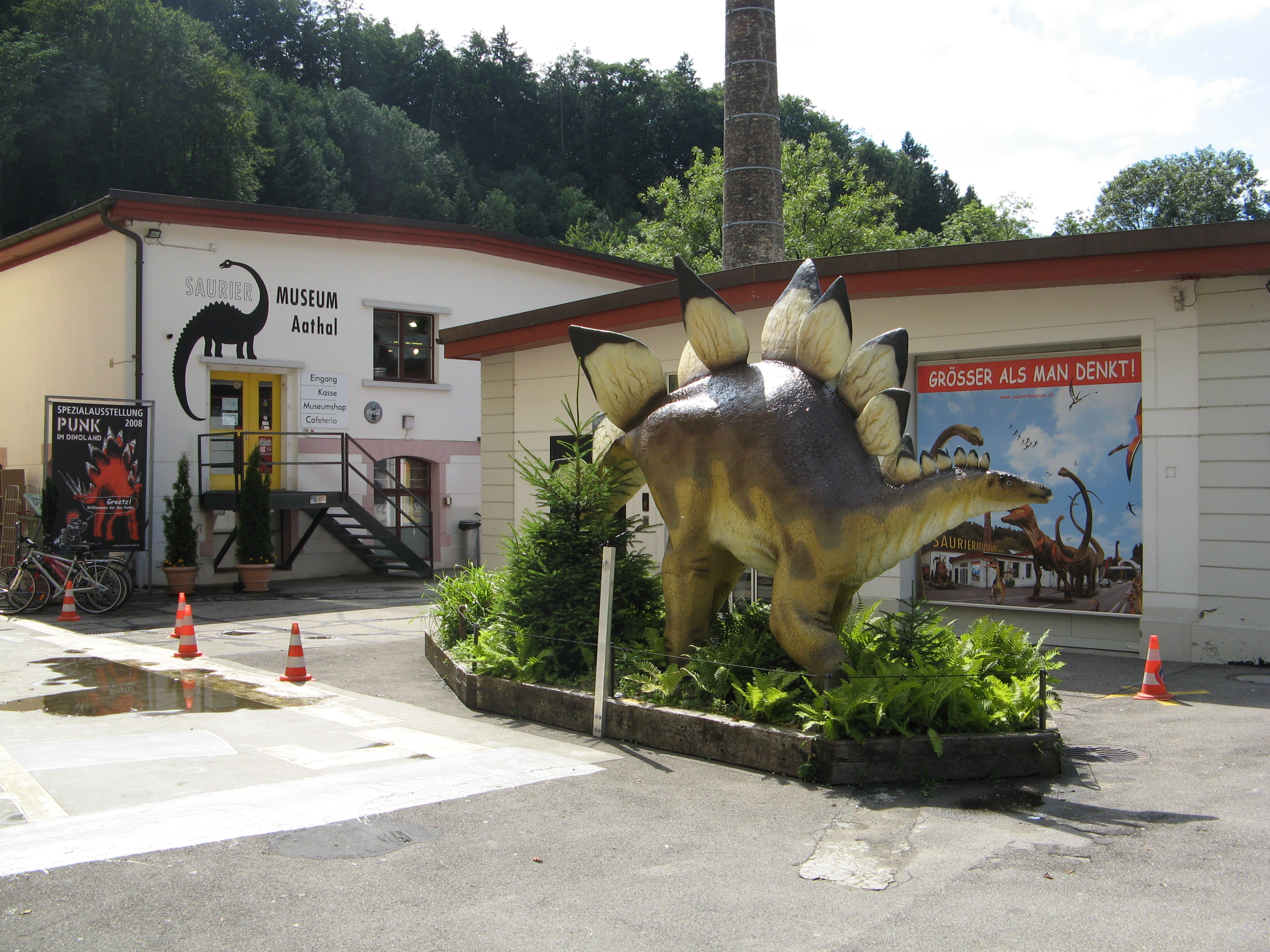
The Aathal Dinosaur Museum

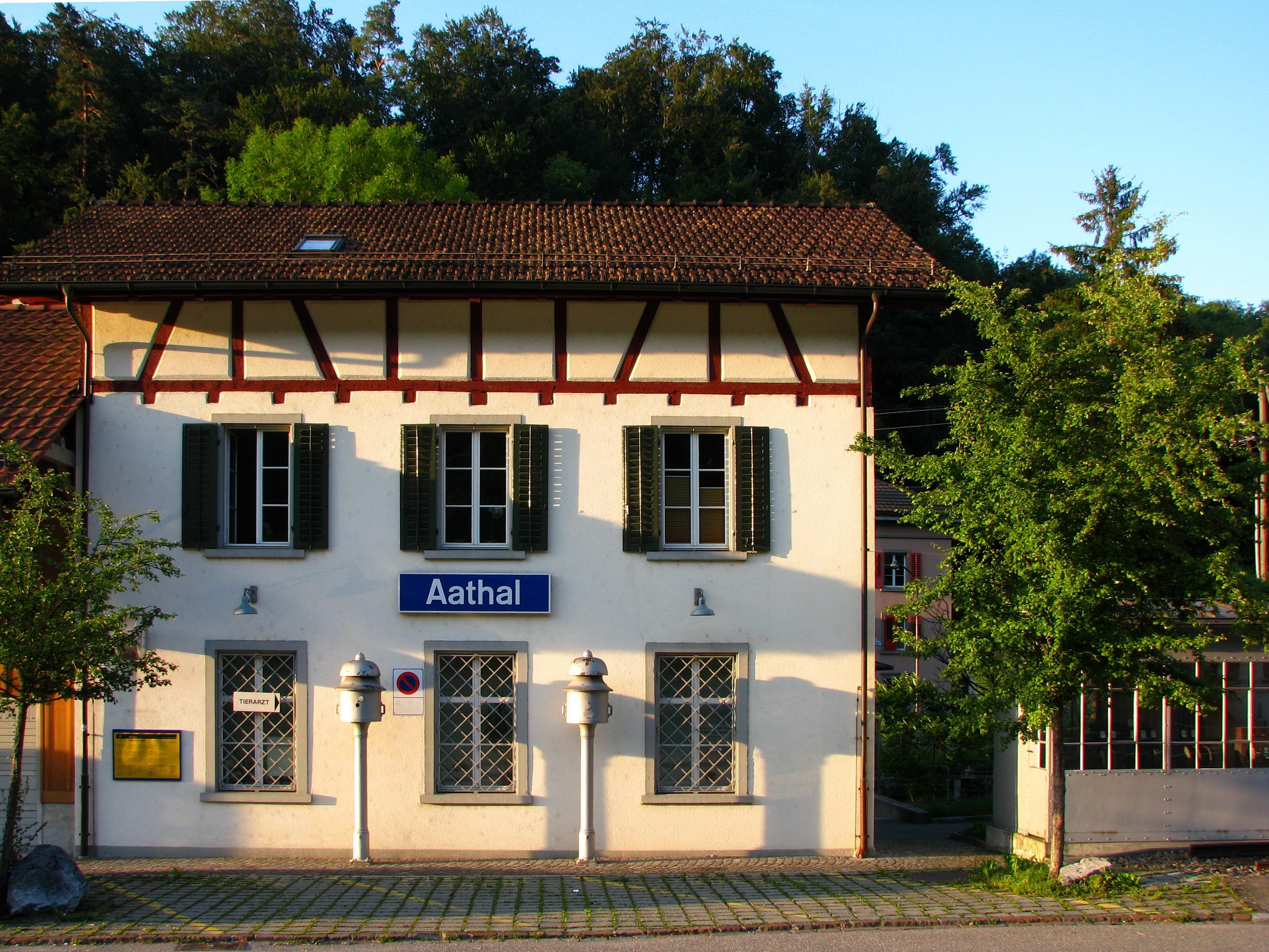
The old railway station of Aathal

Aerial view of the spinning factory Streiff in Aathal by Walter Mittelholzer (1918–1937).

The Aatal (Aa Valley) is a narrow, steep valley of about 40 metres (130 ft) depth surrounded by forests. It is situated between the towns of Wetzikon and Uster in the canton of Zürich, Switzerland.

Through the valley flows the river Aabach, which starts at the effluence of the southern end of the Pfäffikersee and then enters Wetzikon where the river makes a U-turn in the middle of the town towards a southwestern direction before it enters the valley. After the valley of about 4 kilometres (2.5 mi) the Abbach enters Uster, where it also used to be called Usterner Aa, runs through Uster in a western direction before it enters the Greifensee about in the middle of the lake's eastern shore, near Niederuster.

The hamlet of Aathal in the middle of the valley belongs to the municipality of Seegräben.

The Aa Valley is a significant traffic artery. It connects the metropolitan area of Zurich with the municipalities of the Zürich Oberland (Zurich Highlands). In addition to the heavy traffic on the national expressway between Uster and Wetzikon the three S-Bahn railway lines S5, S14, and S15 traverse the valley, each at a half-hourly clock-face schedule so that in average every 5 minutes a train passes through the valley. The S14 stops in Aathal half-hourly.

Besides the buildings of different former spinning mills, which are connected by an industrial teaching path, one finds also the Aathal Dinosaur Museum in Aathal.

During the 18/19th century the water power was intensely used by the cotton industry. Since 2008, there are attempts to re-use the small hydroelectric power plants for power production. Ten power plants operate again nowadays.
