= Greifensee =

Greifensee may refer to:

- Greifensee (lake), lake in the canton of Zürich in Switzerland
- Greifensee, Zürich, municipality located on lake Greifensee
