= Wetzikon =

City in the canton of Zurich, Switzerland

- Municipality
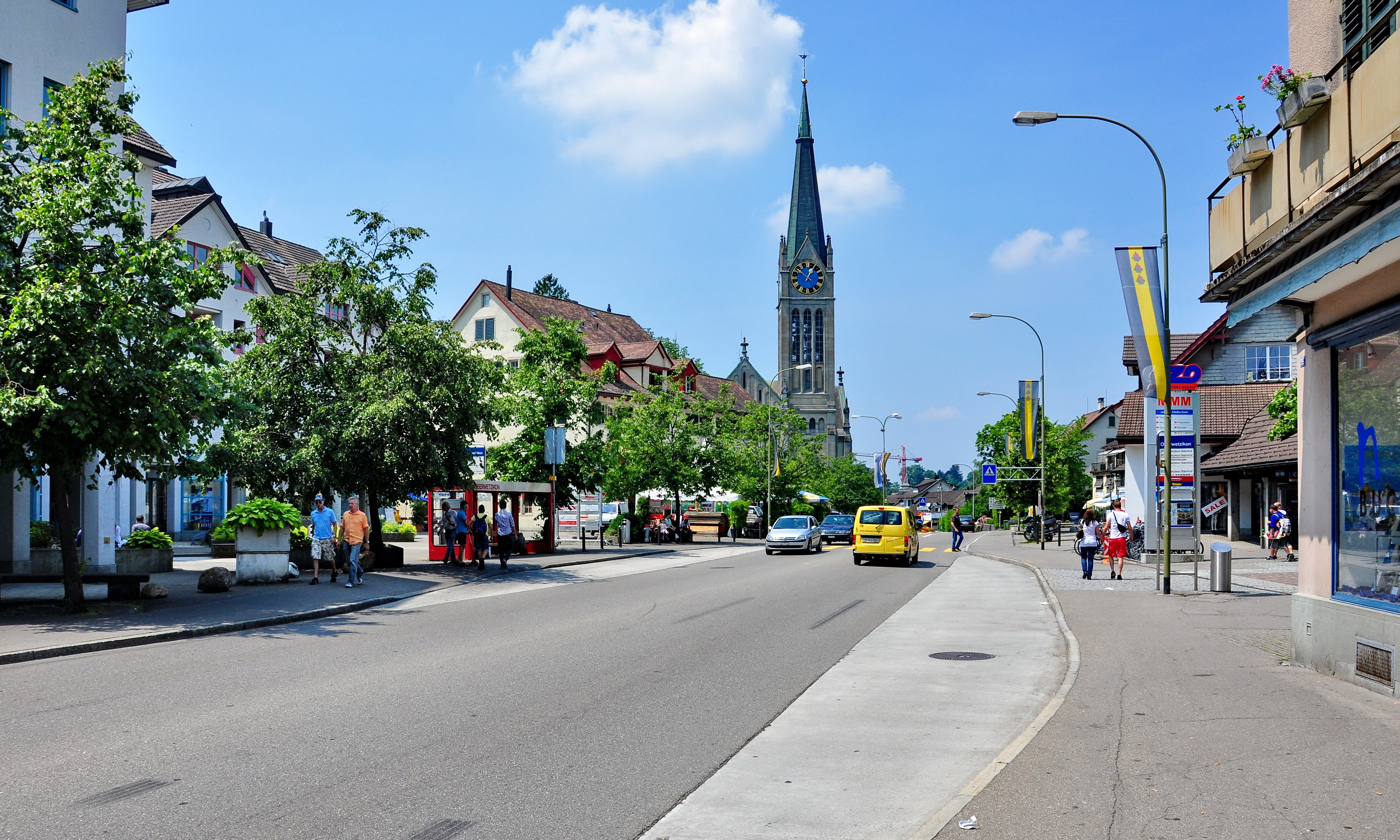

- Flag Coat of arms
- Location of Wetzikon
- Location within Switzerland Location within Canton of Zurich
- Coordinates: 47°19′N 8°48′E
- Country: Switzerland
- Canton: Zurich
- District: Hinwil

Government
  - Executive: Stadtrat with 7 members
  - Mayor: Stadtpräsident; Pascal Bassu SPS/PSS (as of July 2022)
  - Parliament: Parlament with 36 members

Area
  - Total: 16.73 km^{2} (6.46 sq mi)
- Elevation: 535 m (1,755 ft)

Population (December 2020)
  - Total: 25,056
  - Density: 1,498/km^{2} (3,879/sq mi)
- Time zone: UTC+01:00 (CET)
  - Summer (DST): UTC+02:00 (CEST)
- Postal code: 8620, 8623
- SFOS number: 121
- ISO 3166 code: CH-ZH
- Localities: Ettenhausen, Kempten, Medikon, Oberwetzikon, Robank, Robenhausen, Unterwetzikon
- Surrounded by: Bäretswil, Gossau, Hinwil, Mönchaltorf, Pfäffikon, Seegräben
- Twin towns: Melnik (Czech Republic), Badolato (Italy)
- Website: www.wetzikon.ch

Wetzikon (High Alemannic: Wetzike) is a small town in the Zurich Highlands (Zürcher Oberland) area of Switzerland, in the district of Hinwil in the canton of Zürich.

== Geography ==
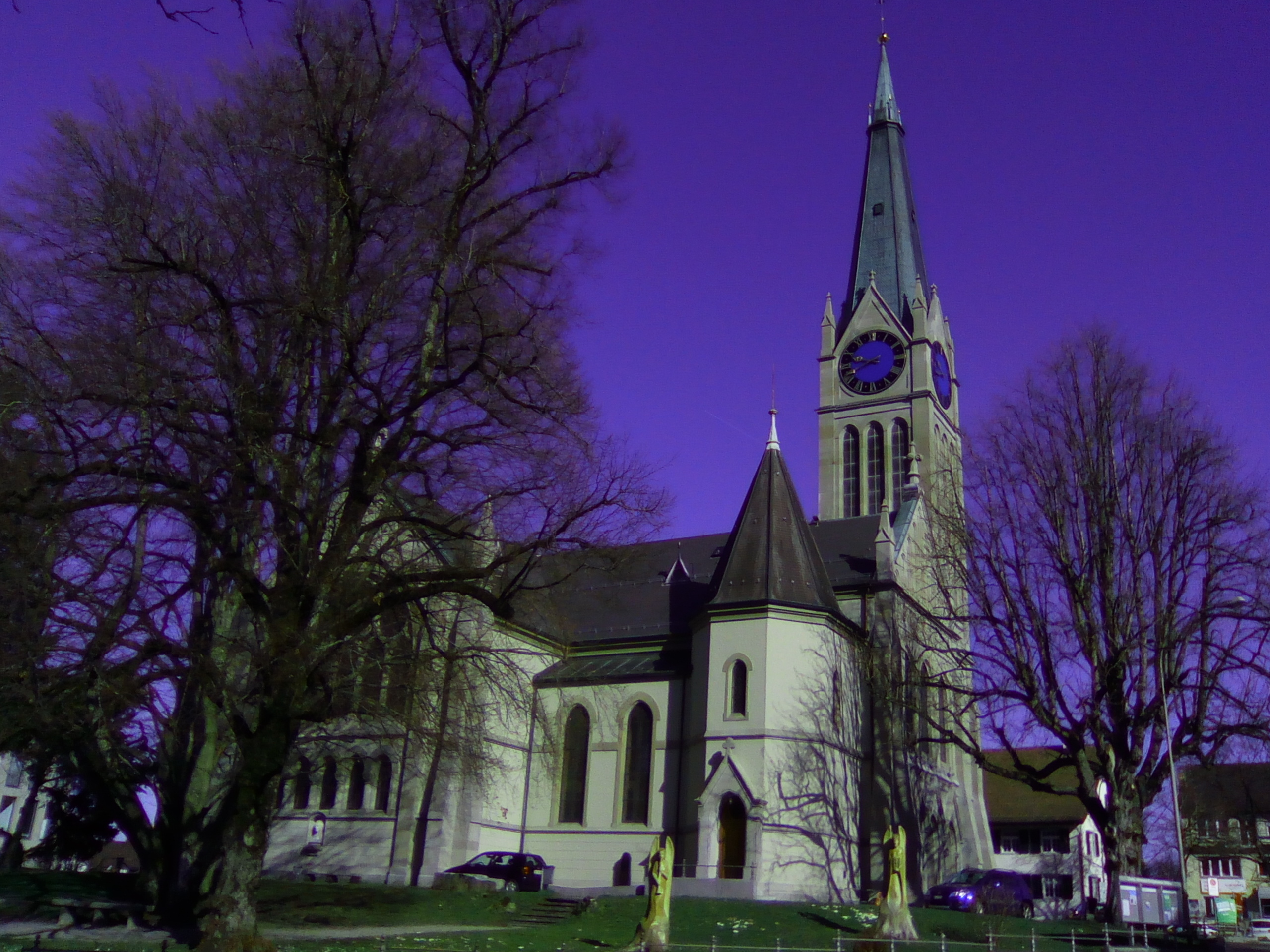
Reformed Church

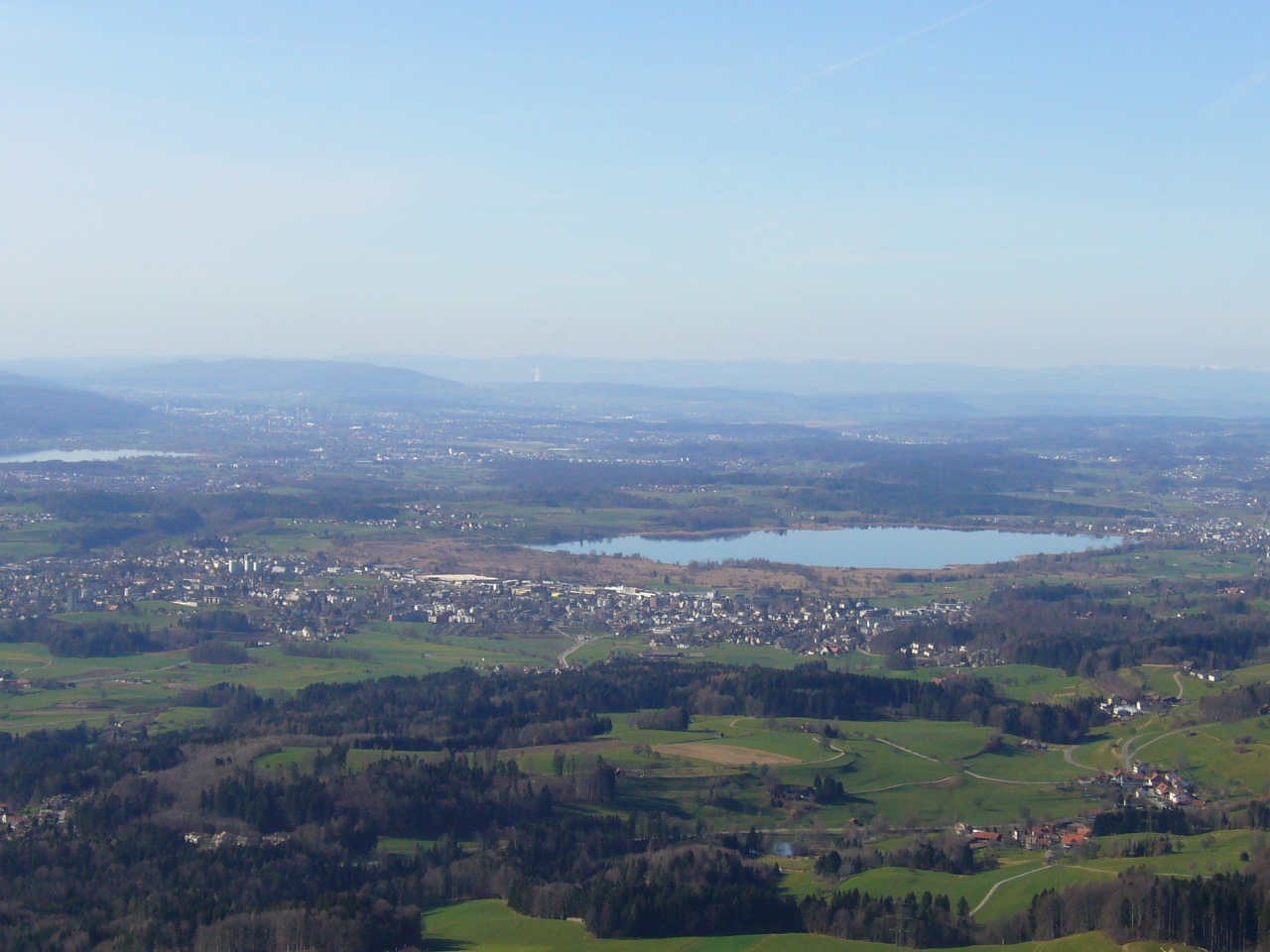
Wetzikon as seen from Bachtel Tower. Pfäffikersee in the middle, Greifensee to the left.

The municipality Wetzikon has an area of 16.7 km^{2} (6.4 sq mi). Of this area, 42.4% is used for agricultural purposes, while 17.6% is forested. Of the rest of the land, 27.9% is settled (buildings or roads) and the remainder (12.1%) is non-productive (streams, lakes and non-productive vegetation). In 1996 housing and buildings made up 20% of the total area, while transportation infrastructure made up the rest (7.9%). Of the total unproductive area, water (streams and lakes) made up 3.3% of the area. As of 2007 30.5% of the total municipal area was undergoing some type of construction.

It is located near Lake Pfäffikon in the Zürcher Oberland, between Uster and Rapperswil-Jona.

The Robenhauser Ried wetland is a nature reserve of national importance and is situated between Seegräben, Kempten and Irgenhausen covering an area of about 2 km^{2} (0.77 sq mi).

== Demographics ==
Wetzikon has a population (as of 31 December 2020) of 25,056. As of 2007, 22.1% of the population was made up of foreign nationals. As of 2008, the gender distribution of the population was 49.2% male and 50.8% female. Over the last 10 years, the population has grown at a rate of 18.8%. Most of the population (as of 2000) speaks German (83.8%), with Italian being second most common (5.7%) and Albanian being third (1.9%).

Nationalities in Wetzikon	End of 2010	End of 2011
Switzerland	76,8 %	76,5 %
Italy	5,5 %	5,2 %
Germany	3,9 %	3,9 %
Portugal	2,4 %	2,6 %
Turkey	1,7 %	1,7 %
Serbia	1,8 %	1,7 %
Kosovo	1,2 %	1,4 %
North Macedonia	1,1 %	1,1 %

In the 2007 election, the most popular party was the SVP which received 37.6% of the vote. The next three most popular parties were the SPS (16.1%), the CSP (12.2%) and the Green Party (10.5%).

The age distribution of the population (as of 2000) is children and teenagers (0–19 years old) make up 23.1% of the population, while adults (20–64 years old) make up 62% and seniors (over 64 years old) make up 15%. There are 7929 households in Wetzikon.

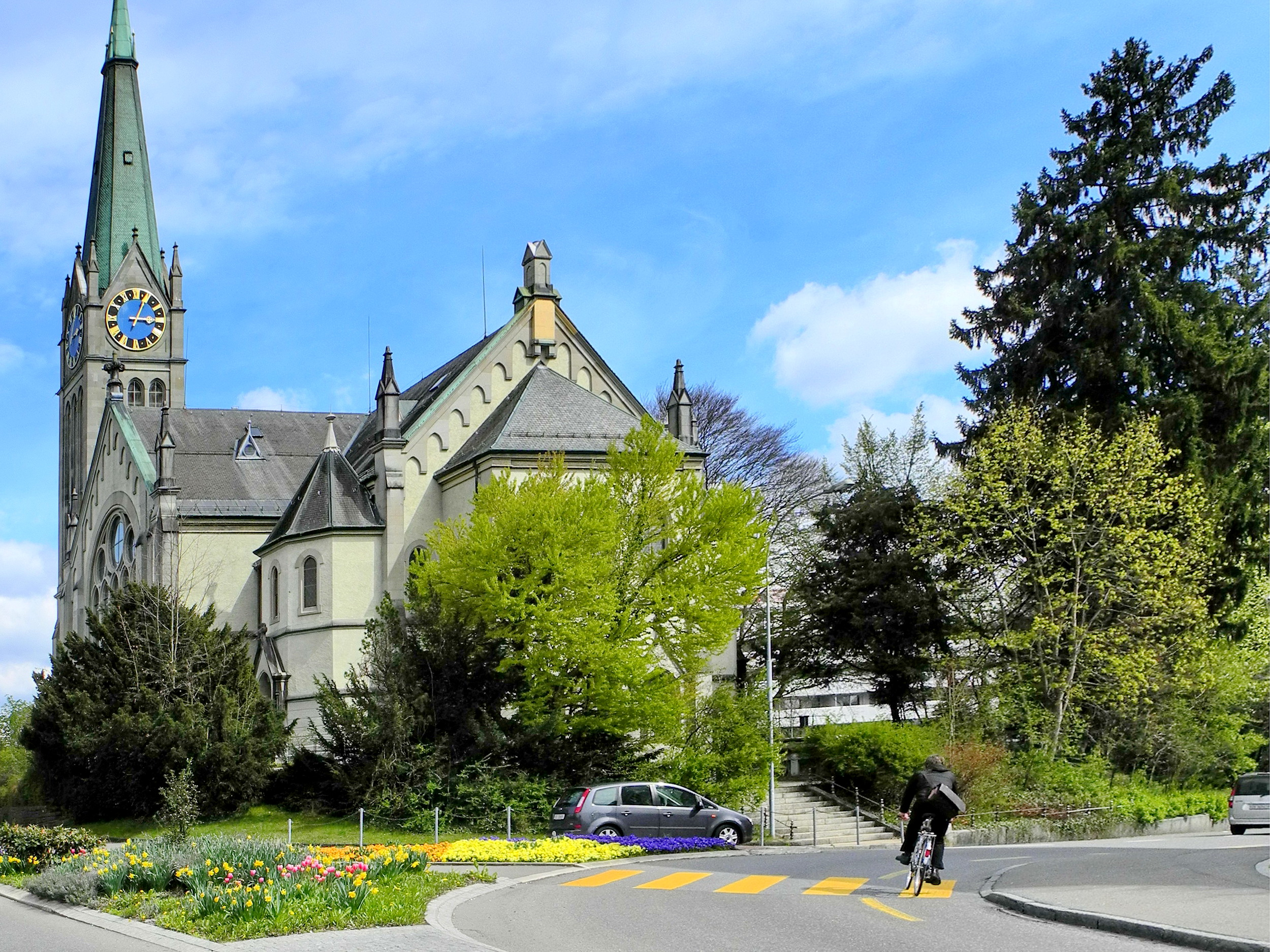
Protestant Church of Wetzikon

As of 2008 there were 6385 Catholics and 7772 Protestants in Wetzikon. In the 2000 census, religion was broken down into several smaller categories. From the 2000 census, 45% were some type of Protestant, with 40.3% belonging to the Swiss Reformed Church and 4.7% belonging to other Protestant churches. 31.3% of the population were Catholic. Of the rest of the population, 6.5% were Muslim, 8.7% belonged to another religion (not listed), 3.6% did not give a religion, and 10.6% were atheist or agnostic.

== Economics and education ==
The Kantonschule Zürcher Oberland (KZO), or the "Kanti" as the gymnasium level learning institution is known in Swiss German, is based in Wetzikon due to its central location in the Zürich Oberland, as well as the Zürcher Oberländer newspaper and the annual ZOM trade fair.

The regional hospital, the Gesundheitsversorgung Zürcher Oberland is also located there.

Wetzikon has an unemployment rate of 2.9%. As of 2005, there were 134 people employed in the primary economic sector and about 41 businesses involved in this sector. 3486 people are employed in the secondary sector and there are 255 businesses in this sector. 7054 people are employed in the tertiary sector, with 838 businesses in this sector. As of 2007 43.8% of the working population were employed full-time, and 56.2% were employed part-time.

In Wetzikon about 69.4% of the population (between age 25-64) have completed either non-mandatory upper secondary education or additional higher education (either university or a Fachhochschule).

== World Heritage Site ==
The prehistoric settlement Wetzikon–Robenhausen at the Robenhausen wetland which was discovered and researched by Jakob Messikommer is part of the serial site Prehistoric Pile dwellings around the Alps, an UNESCO World Heritage Site.

== Transportation ==
There are two railway stations within the municipality. Wetzikon railway station is a node of the Zürich S-Bahn on the following lines:

- S3 (Bülach–) Hardbrücke–Zürich HB–Effretikon–Wetzikon
- S5 Zug–Affoltern am Albis–Zürich HB–Uster–Wetzikon–Rapperswil–Pfäffikon SZ
- S14 Affoltern am Albis–Zürich HB–Oerlikon–Uster–Wetzikon–Hinwil
- S15 Niederweningen–Hardbrücke–Zürich HB–Uster–Wetzikon–Rapperswil

Kempten railway station is on the S3 line only. Wetzikon is a 20-minute (S5 or S15) ride from Zürich Hauptbahnhof. In addition, the Dampfbahn-Verein Zürcher Oberland heritage railway provides seasonal excursion service at Ettenhausen-Emmetschloo.

== Gallery ==
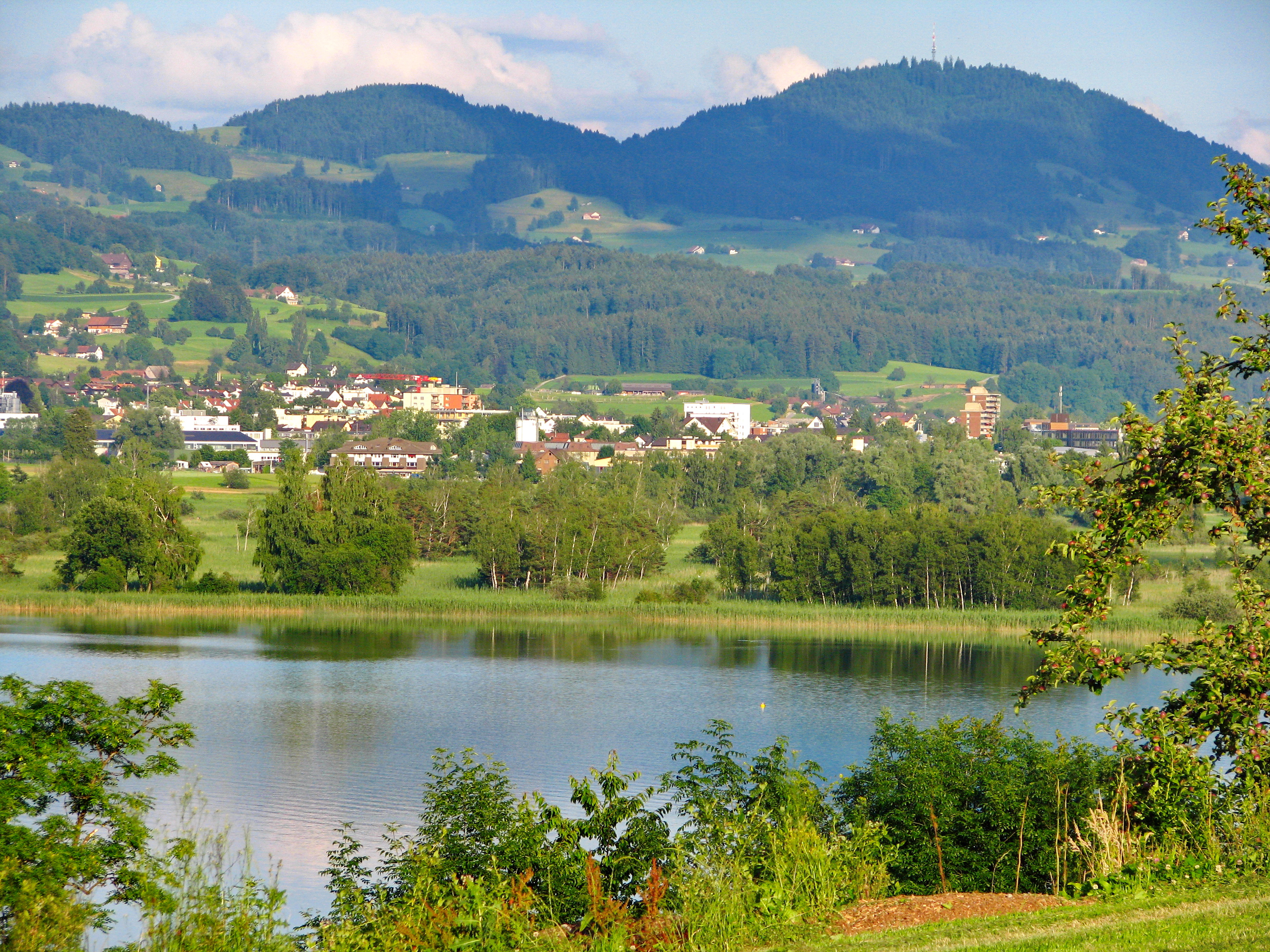
Kempten, Bachtel in the background

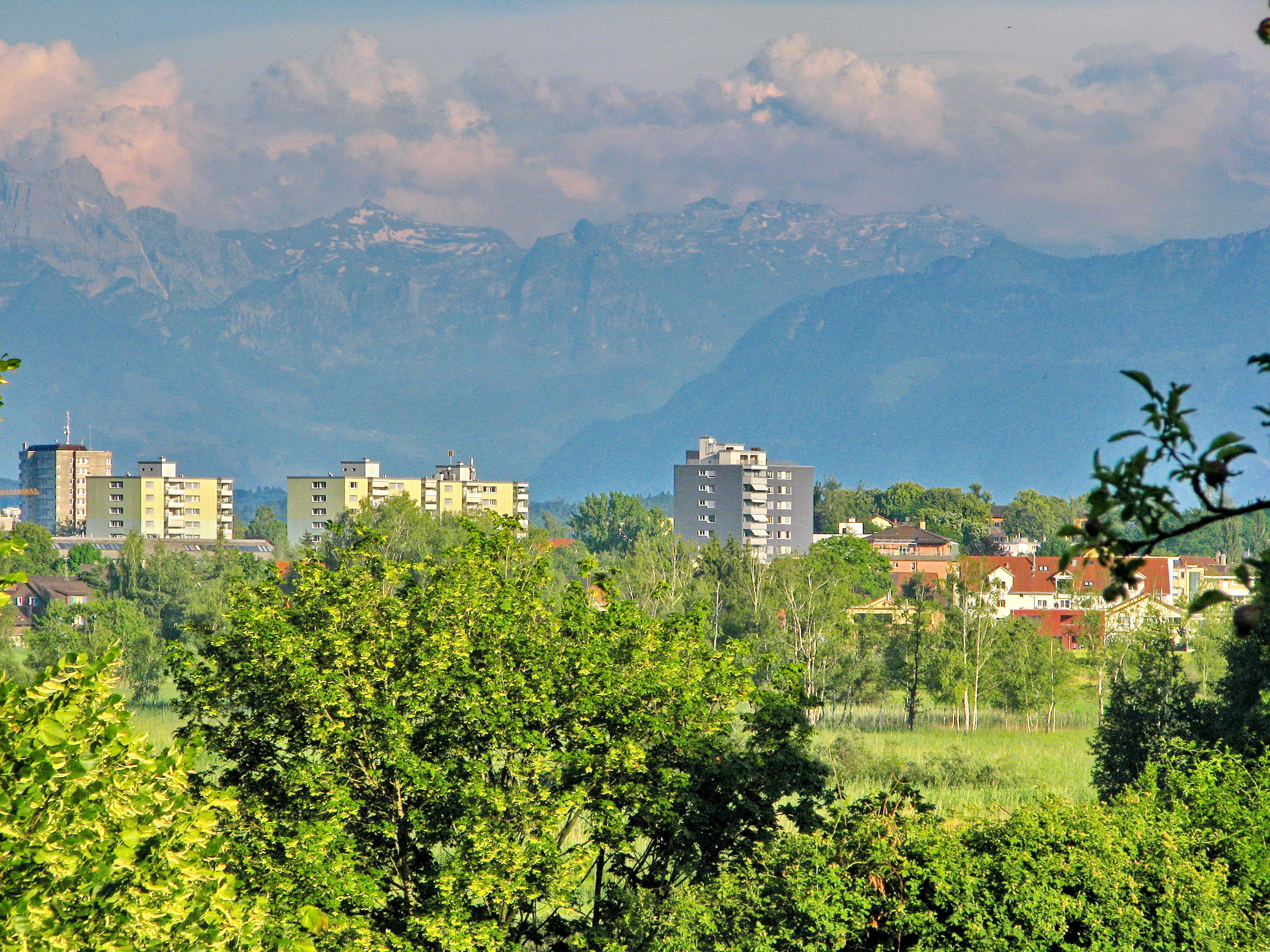
Apartments buildings in Oberwetzikon, Alps in the background

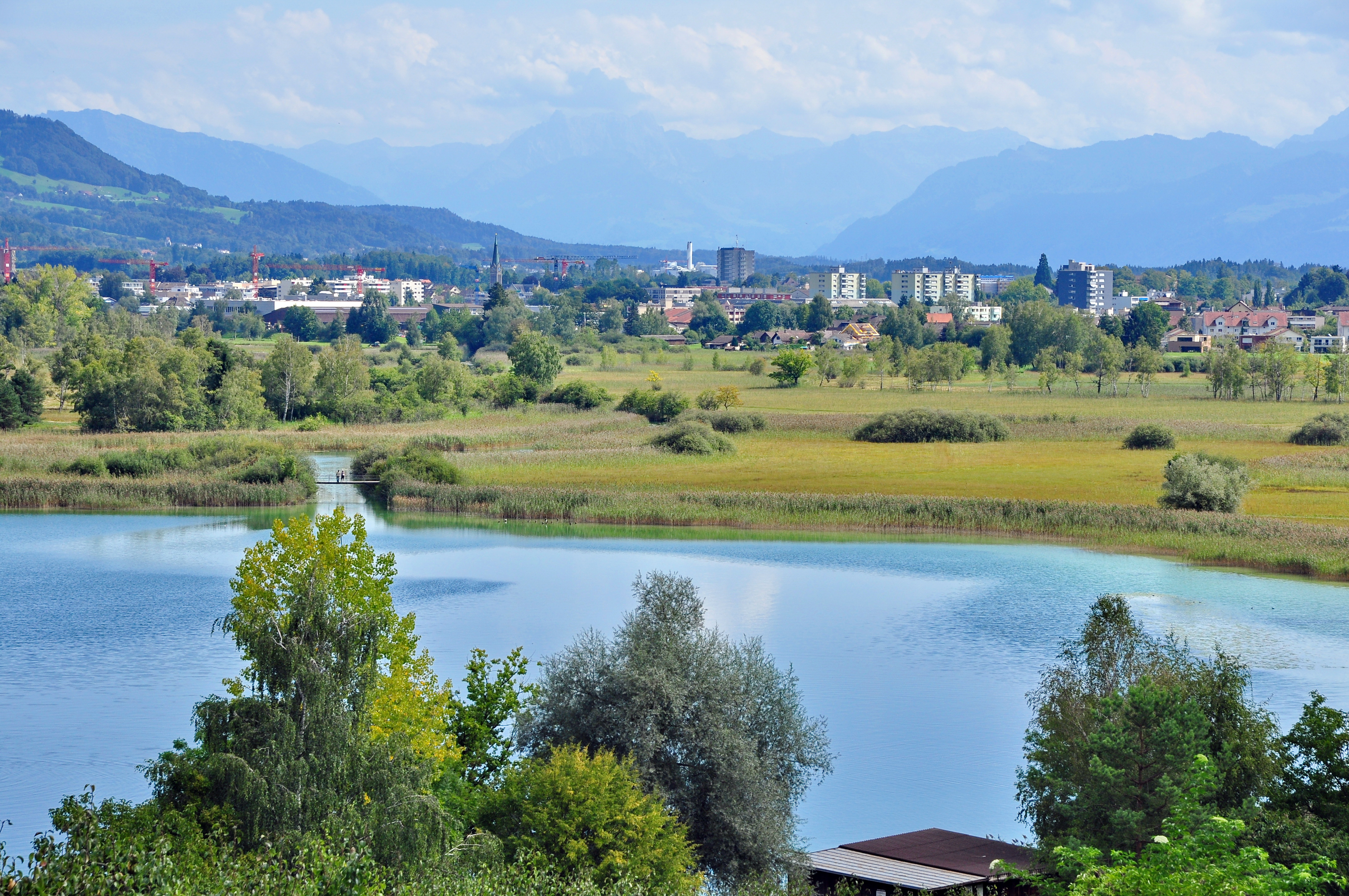
Robenhuserriet in Robenhausen

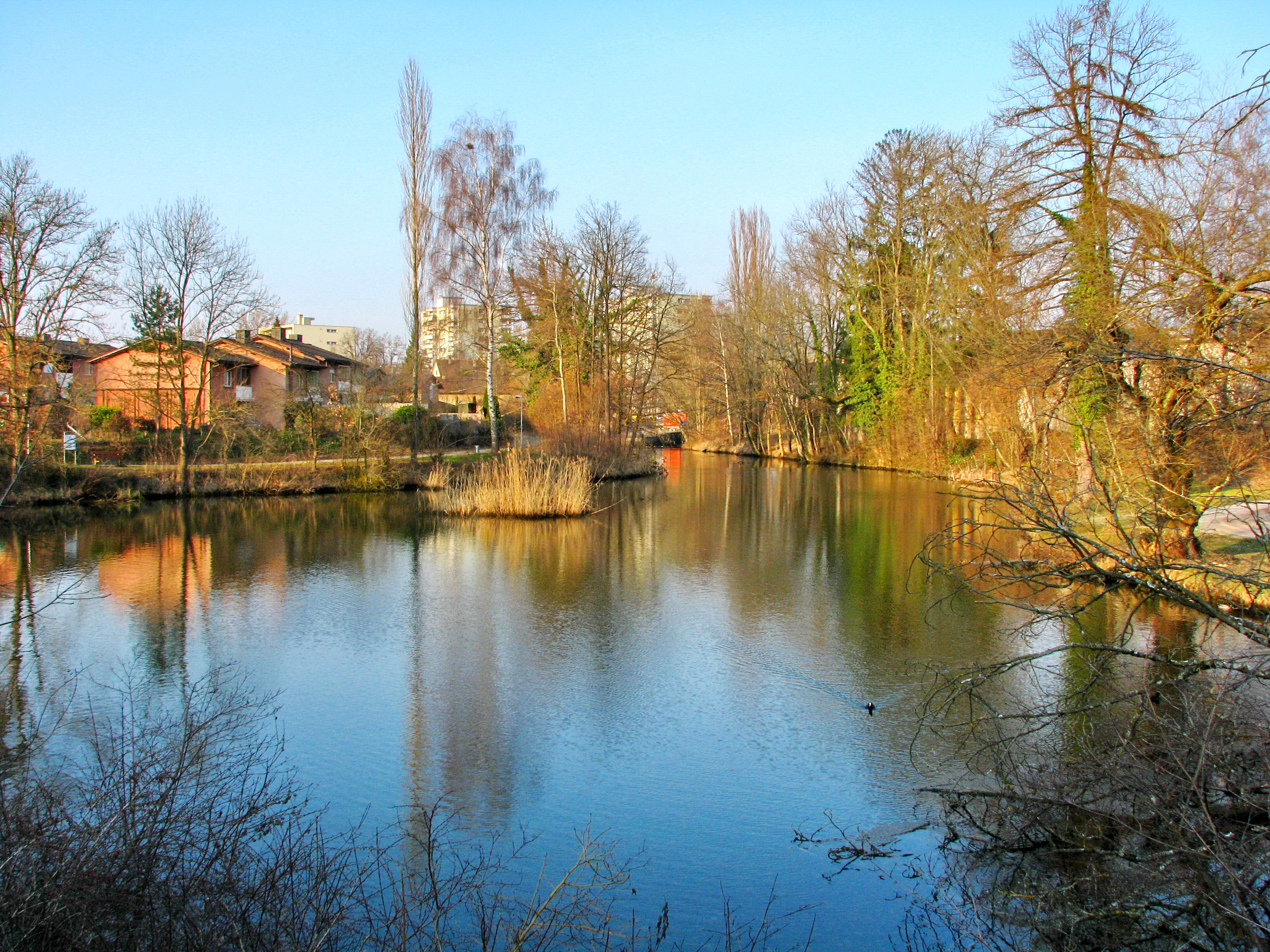
Aabach in Wetzikon

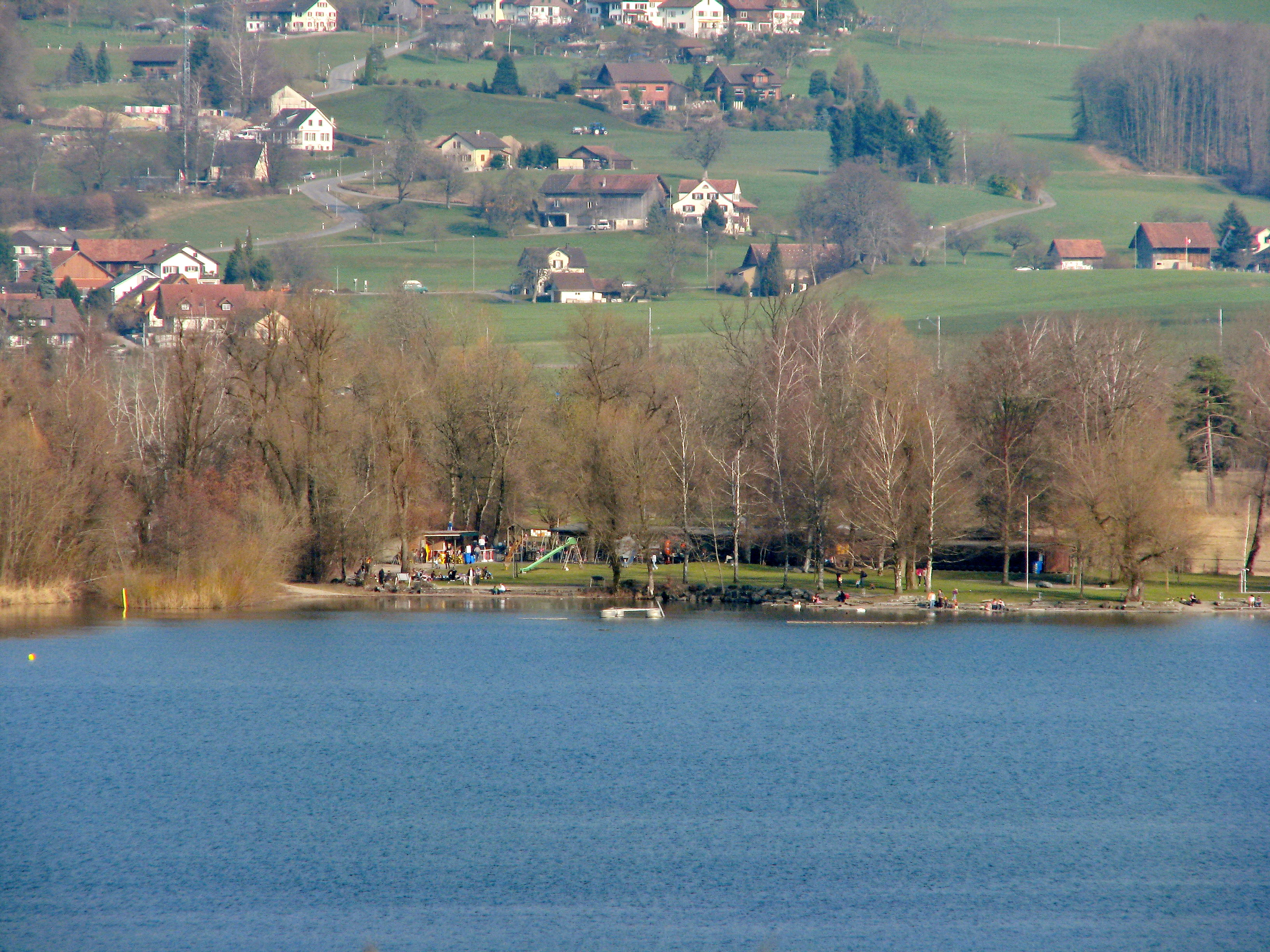
Auslikon and its Strandbad (lido) on Lake Pfäffikon shore

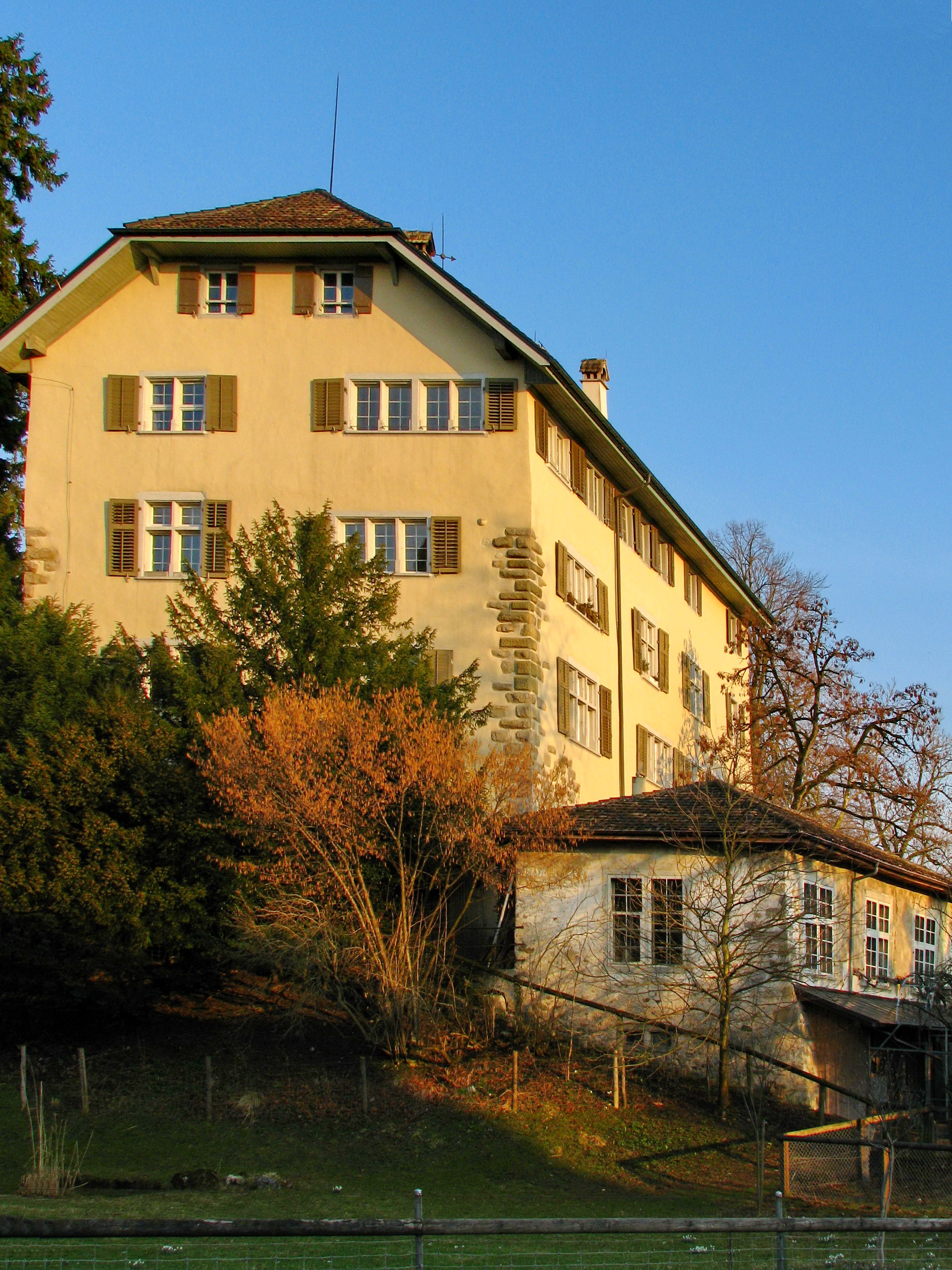
Schloss (castle) Wetzikon

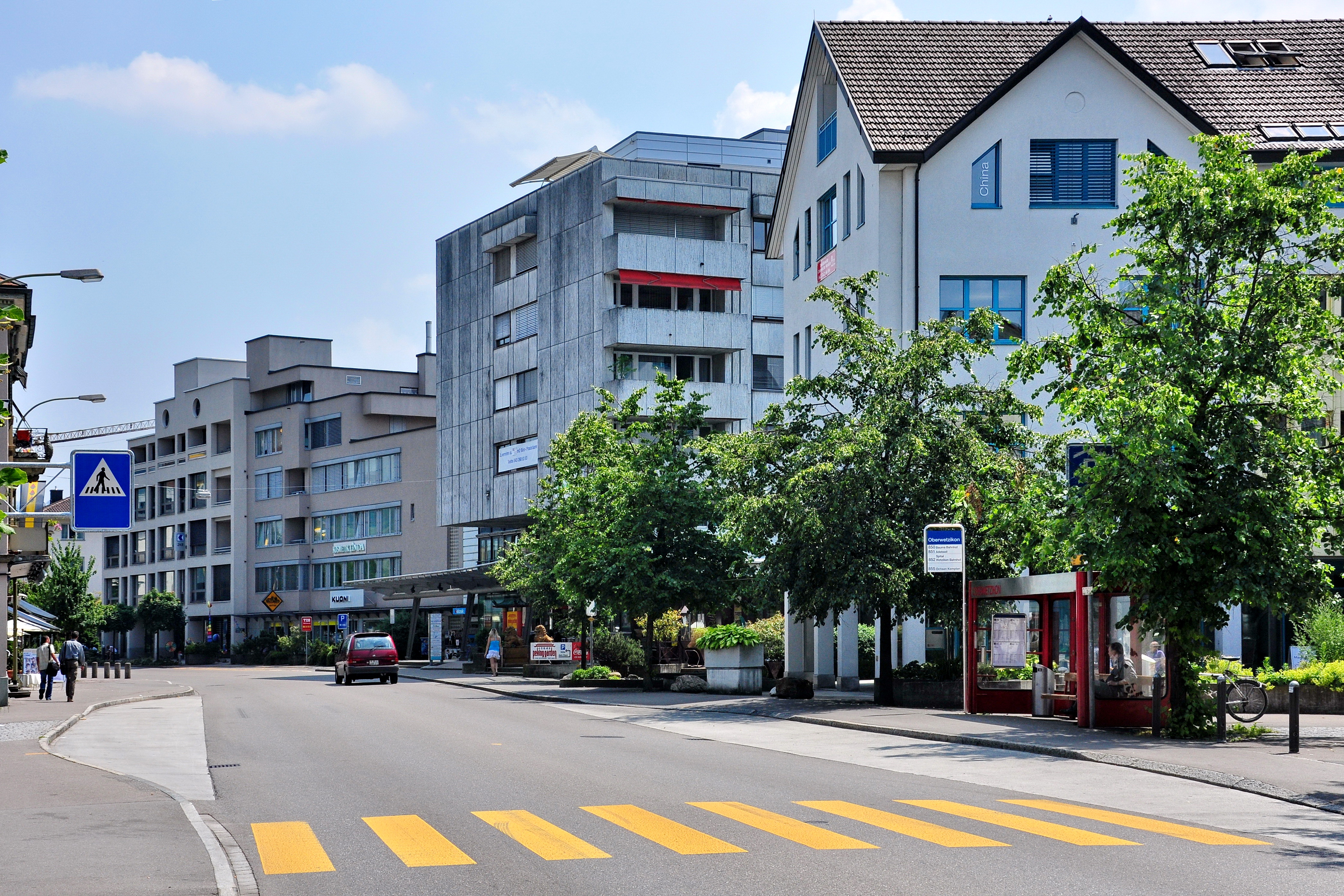
Bahnhofstrasse between Oberwetzikon and Kempten

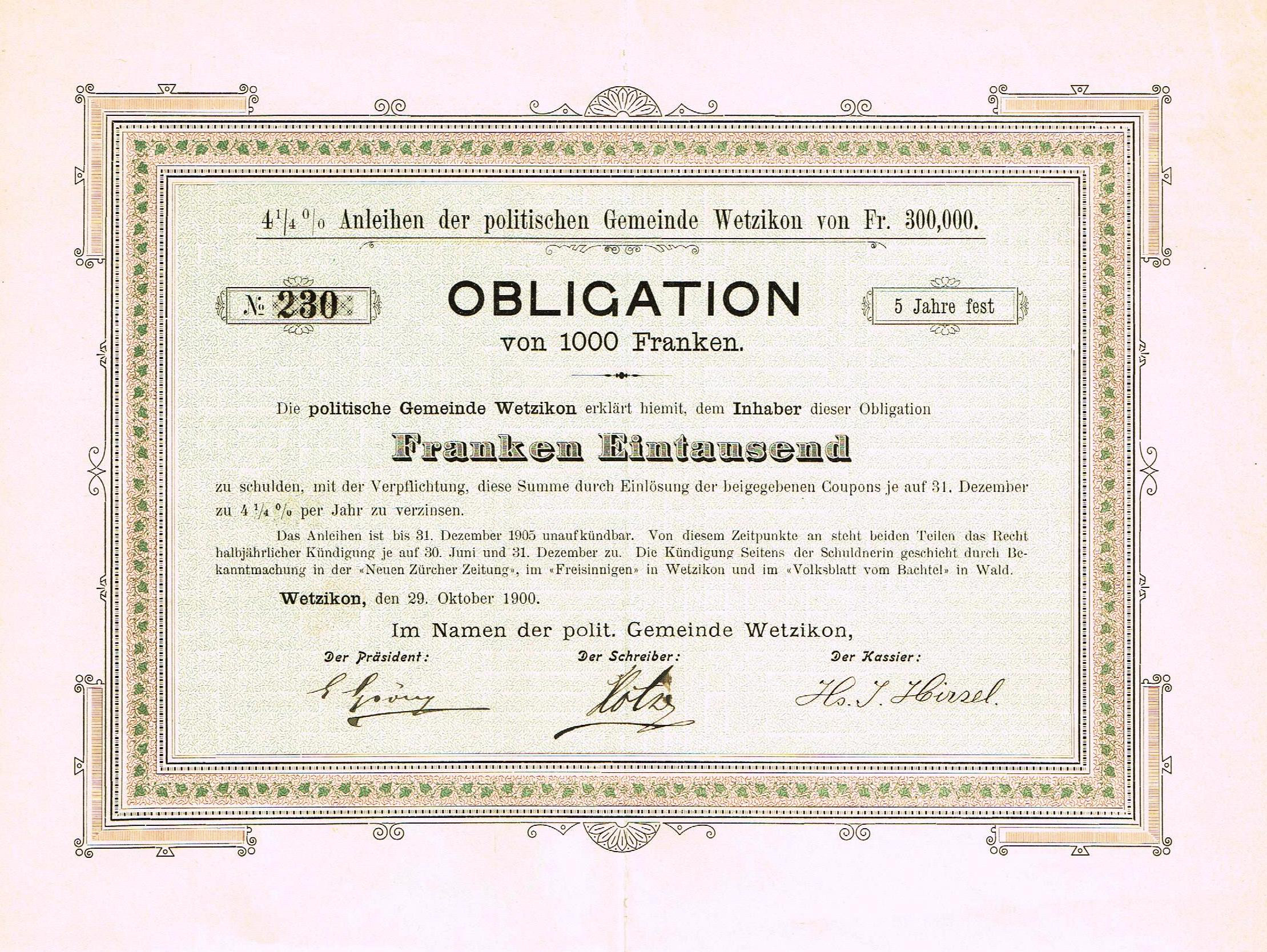
Bond of the municipality Wetzikon, issued 29. October 1900

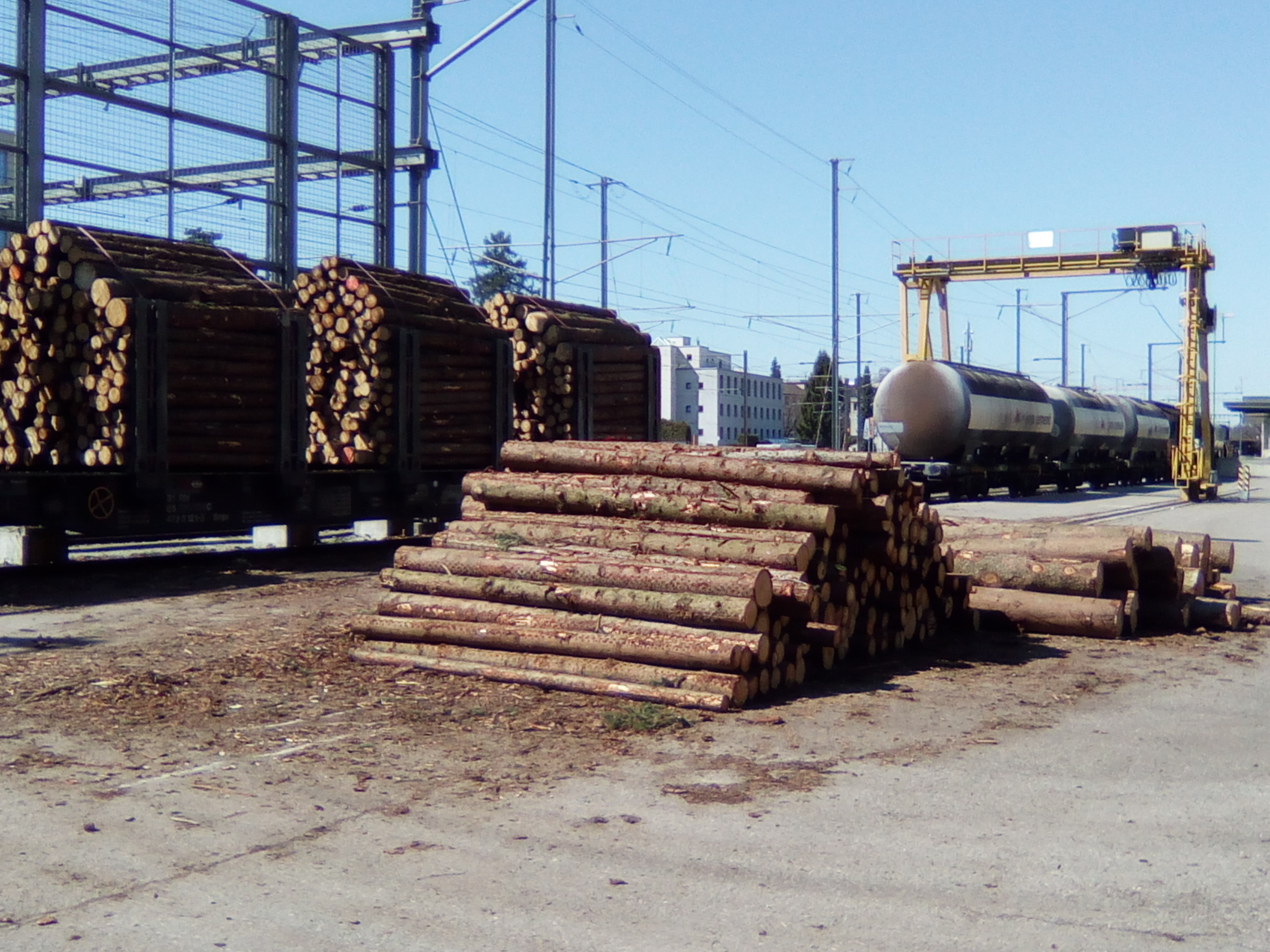
lumber with railroad cars (Wetzikon station)

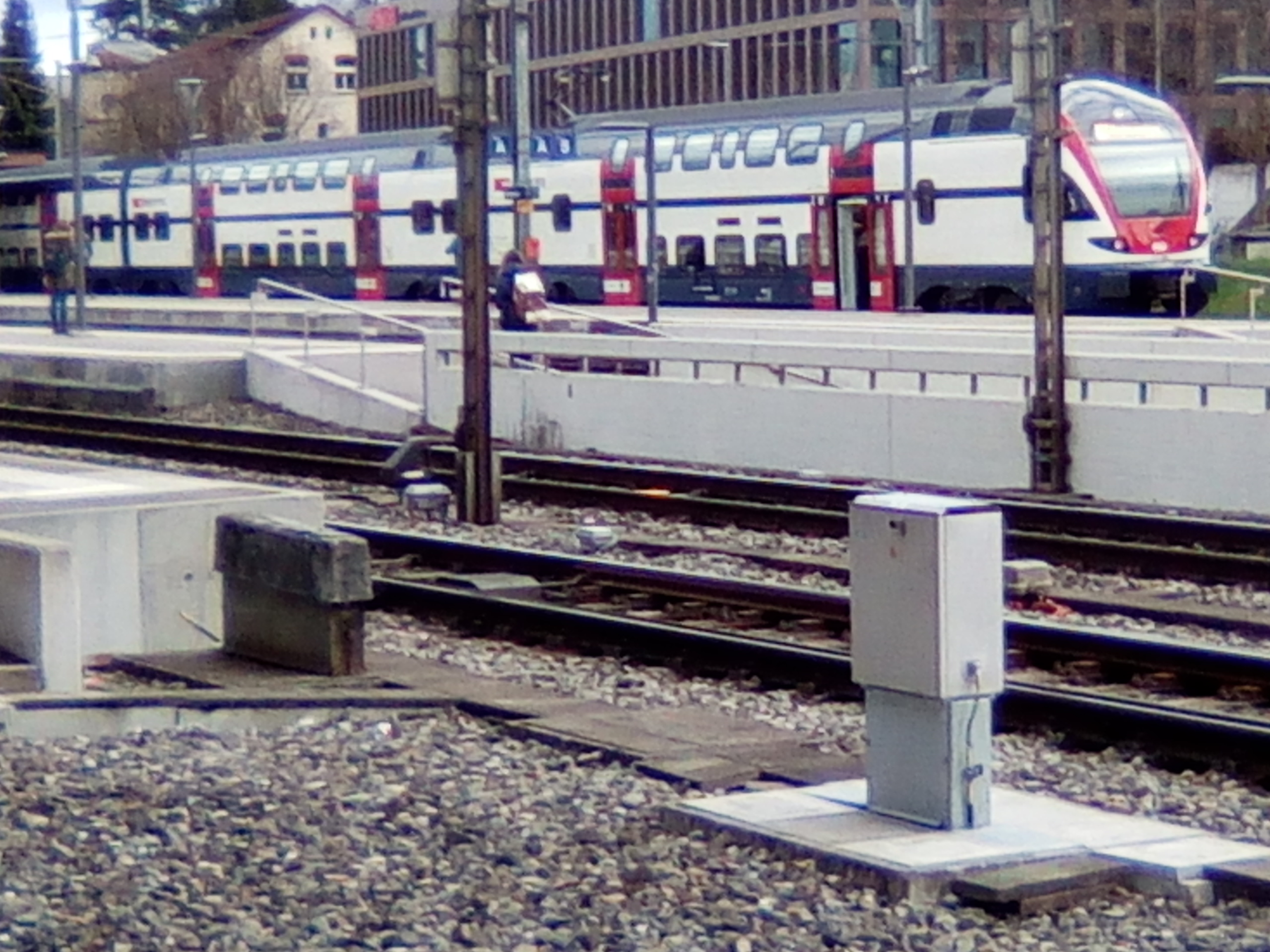
S-train (Wetzikon station)

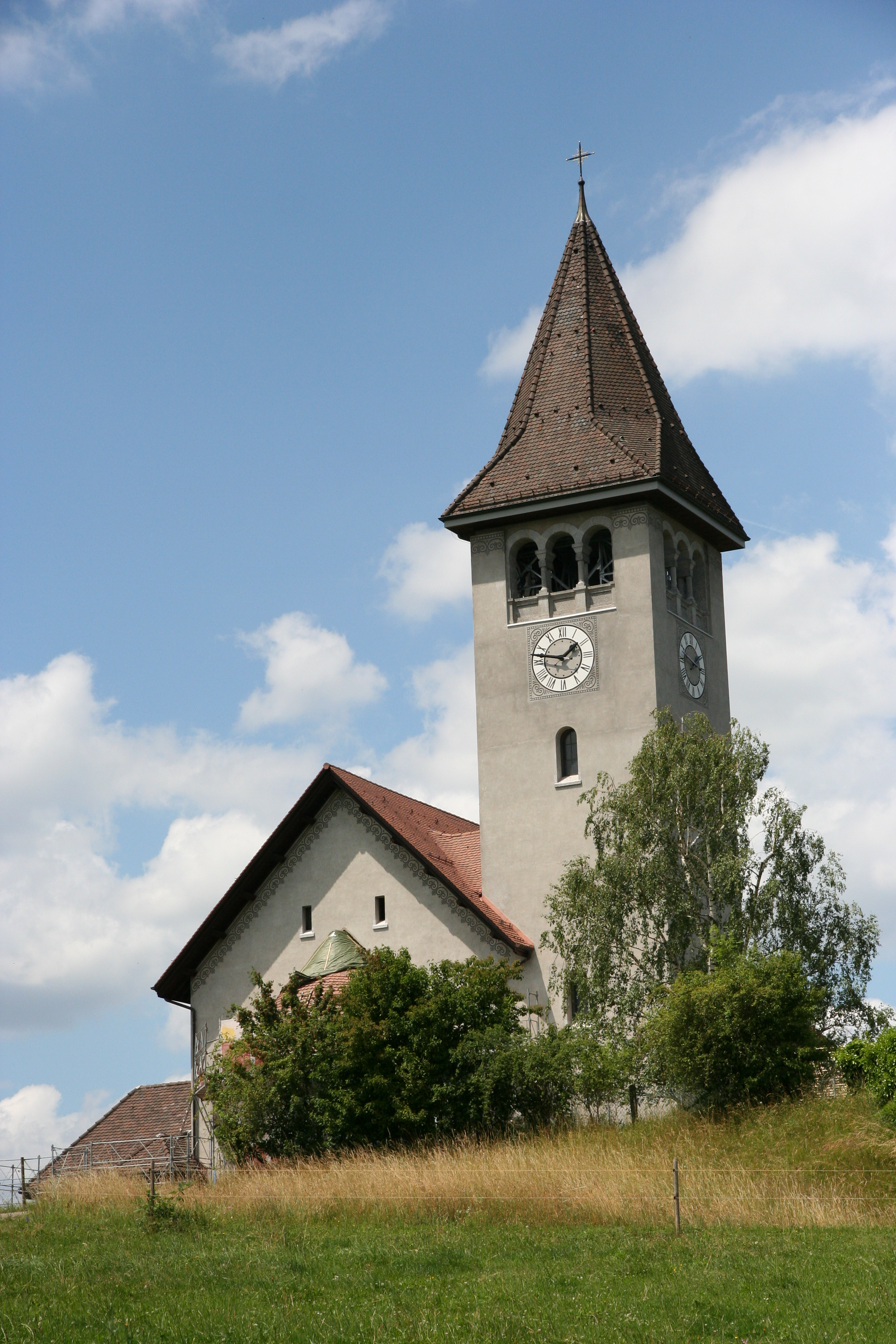
Saint Francis's Church

== History ==
Aerial view by Walter Mittelholzer (1931)

The oldest surviving document about the name Wetzikon is from the year 1044, where three nobles of "Wezzinchova" are mentioned; before that the village and castle were known by the name Ratpoldskilch. Older history is known from excavations of prehistoric pile dwellings in Robenhausen and a Roman villa rustica in Kempten.

== Sights ==
- The local museum (Ortsmuseum) documents the cultural history from the Neolithic Age until the 21st century
- Robenhauser Riet
- Kemptner Tobel

== Notable persons ==
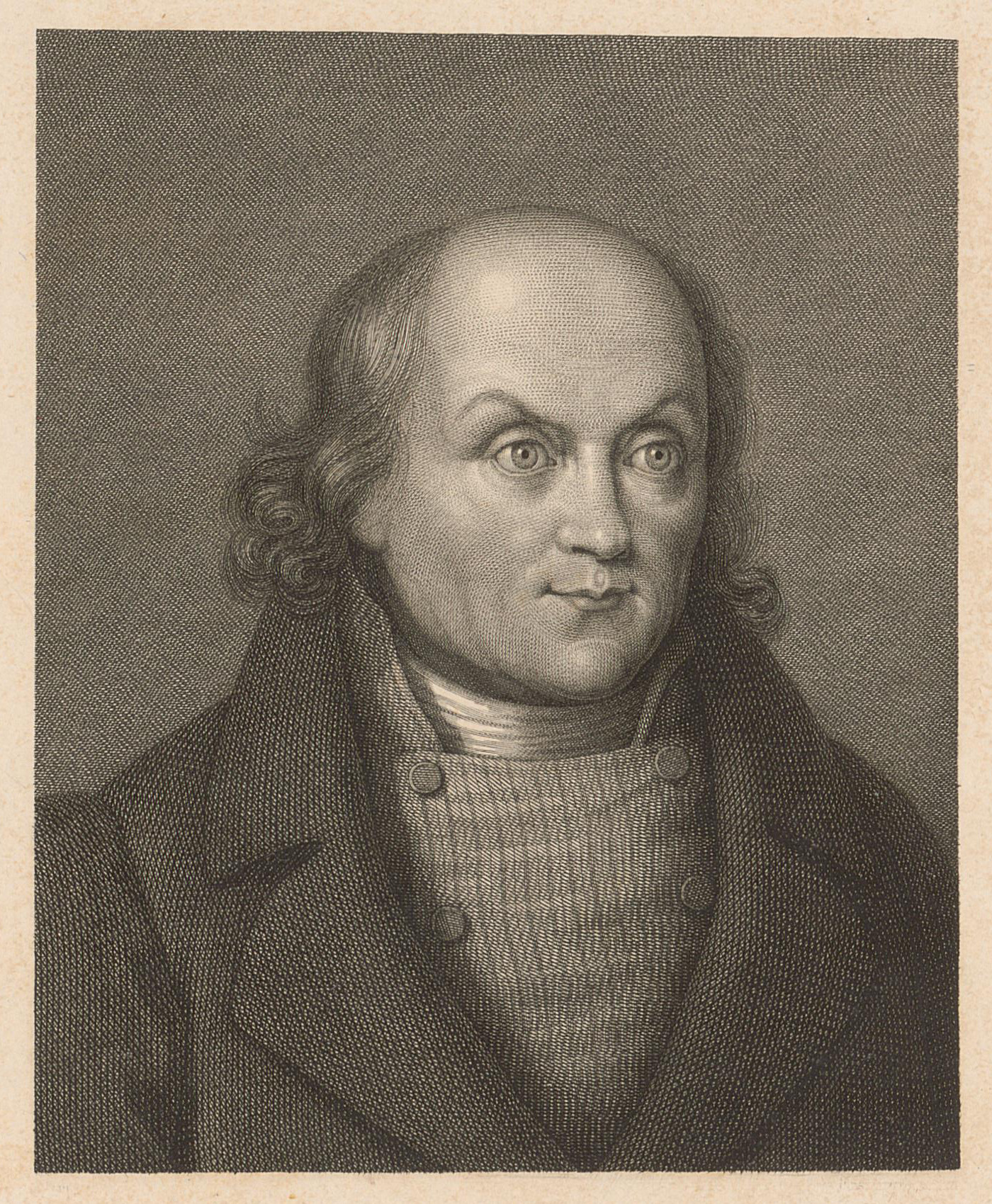
Hans Georg Nägeli, 1838

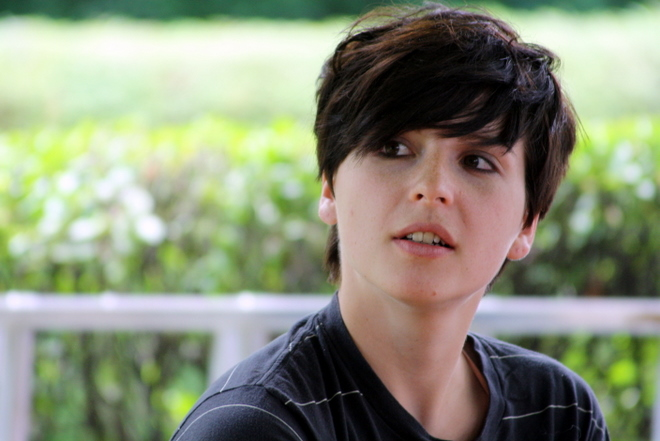
Dorothee Elmiger, 2010

- Elisabeth of Wetzikon (1235-1298) imperial abbess of the Fraumünster abbey 1270-1298
- Johannes Schmidlin (1722-1772) pastor and composer
- Hans Georg Nägeli (1773-1836) composer and music publisher
- Heinrich Leuthold (1827-1879) poet and translator
- Jakob Messikommer (1828-1917) wetland archaeologist, researched the settlement at Robenhausen
- Jakob Heusser (1862–1941) industrialist and philanthropist
- Hedi Lang (1931-2004) politician, second woman to preside in the Swiss National Council
- Jörg Schneider (1935-2015) stage and film actor
- Walter Andreas Müller (born 1945) stage and film actor, radio host and comedian
- Ueli Maurer (born 1950), politician, member of the Swiss Federal Council
- Eric Franklin (born 1957) dancer, movement educator, university lecturer and writer
- Patrick Mohr (born 1971) former professional tennis player
- Andreas Schweizer (born 1979) gymnast
- Dorothee Elmiger (born 1985), writer
- Steven Deana (born 1990) football goalkeeper currently playing for FC Aarau
- Natalie Kanyapak Phoksomboon (born 1991) Thai-Swiss beauty queen, won Miss Thailand World 2013
