= Aabach (Greifensee) =

River in Switzerland

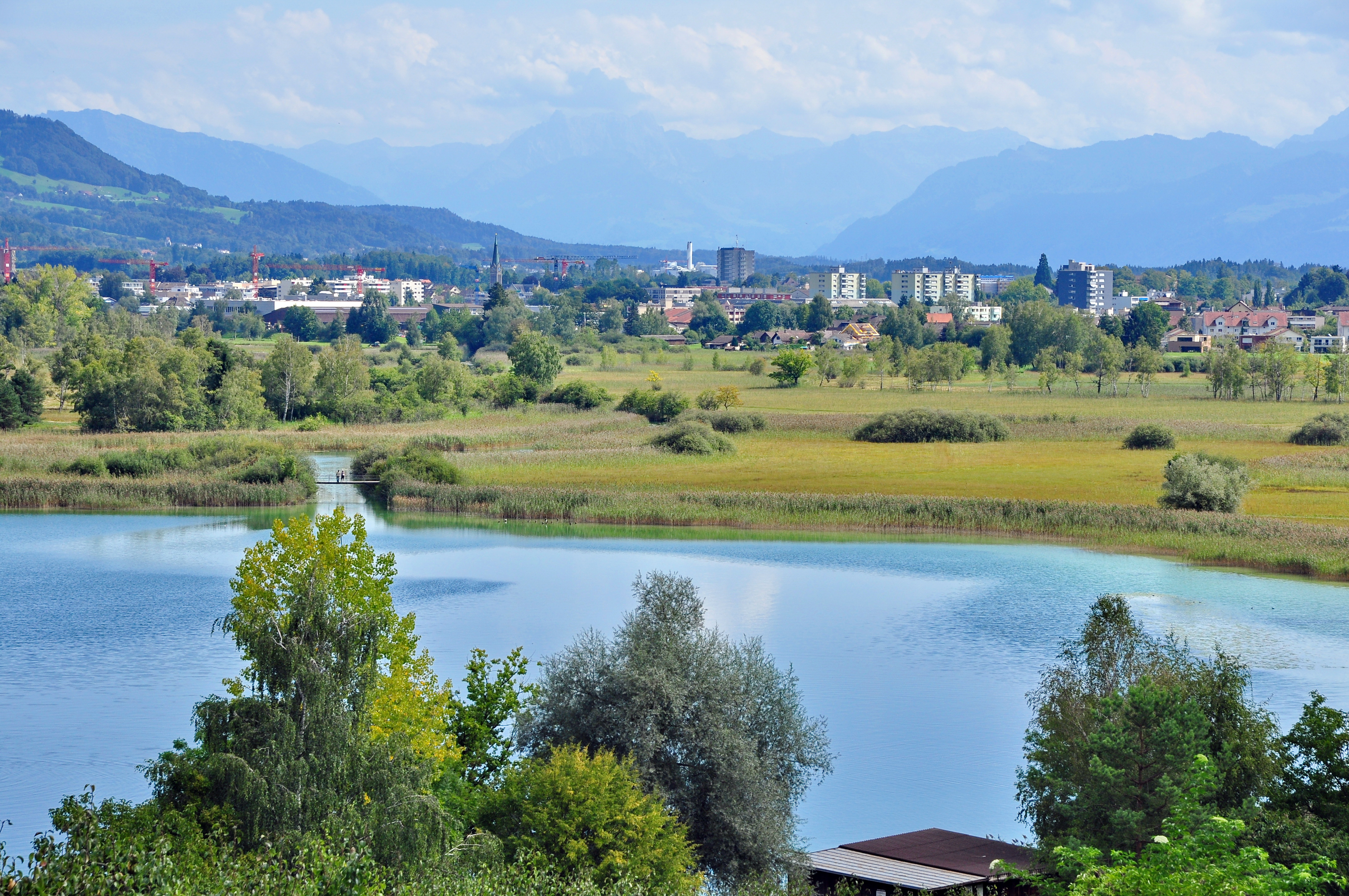

Location
- Country: Switzerland

Physical characteristics
- Source: Pfäffikersee
- Mouth: Greifensee
  - coordinates: 47.3516°N 8.6888°E

Basin features
- Progression: Greifensee→ Glatt→ Rhine→ North Sea

The Aabach (also Aa, or Ustermer Aa for disambiguation with the Mönchaltorfer Aa) is a minor river in the canton of Zürich, Switzerland. At a length of 11.2 kilometres (7.0 mi), it flows from Pfäffikersee to the Greifensee. Its valley is known as Aatal ("Aa Valley"), eponymous of the settlement Aathal.

== Gallery ==
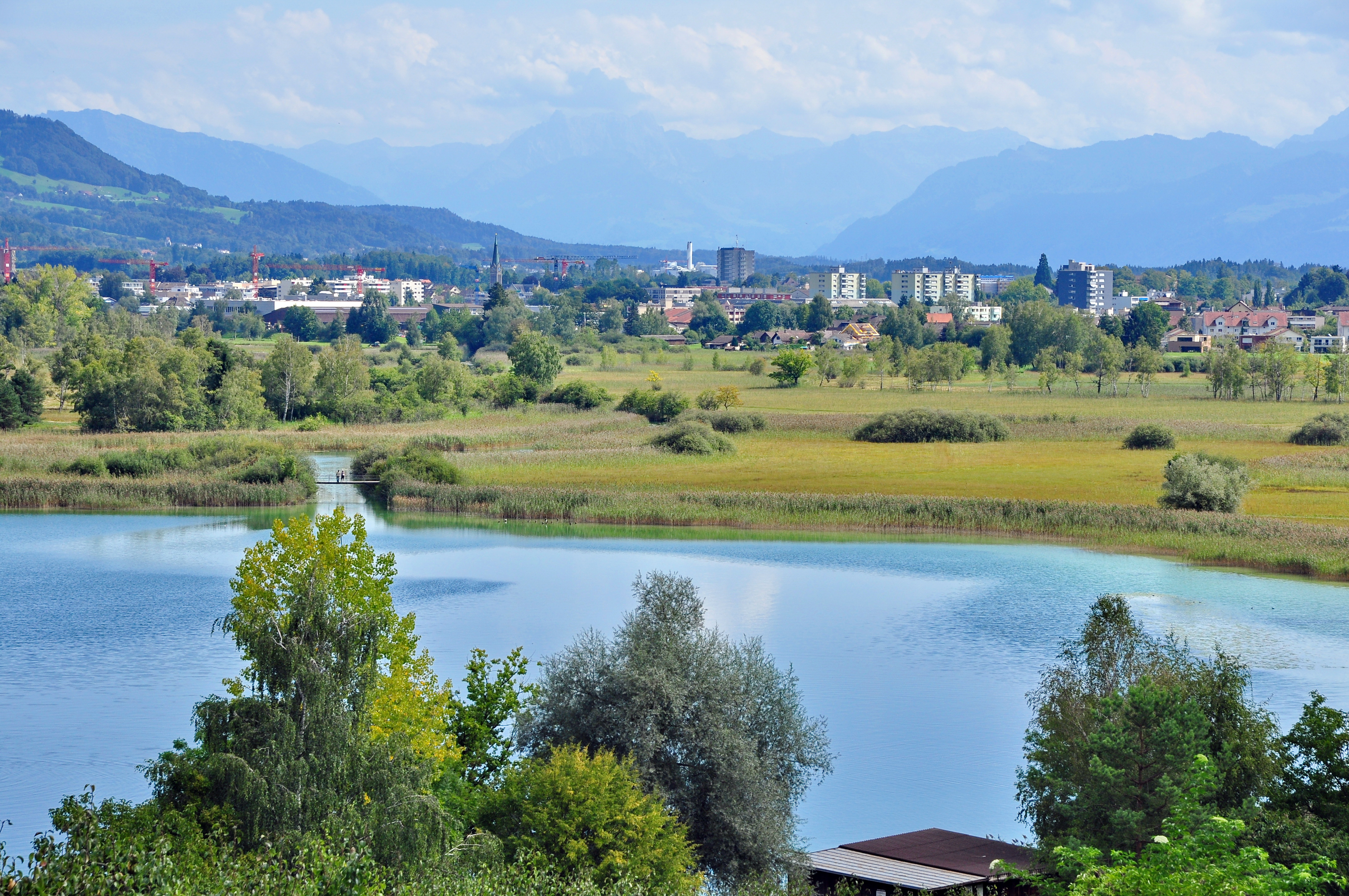
Aabach on Lake Pfäffikon

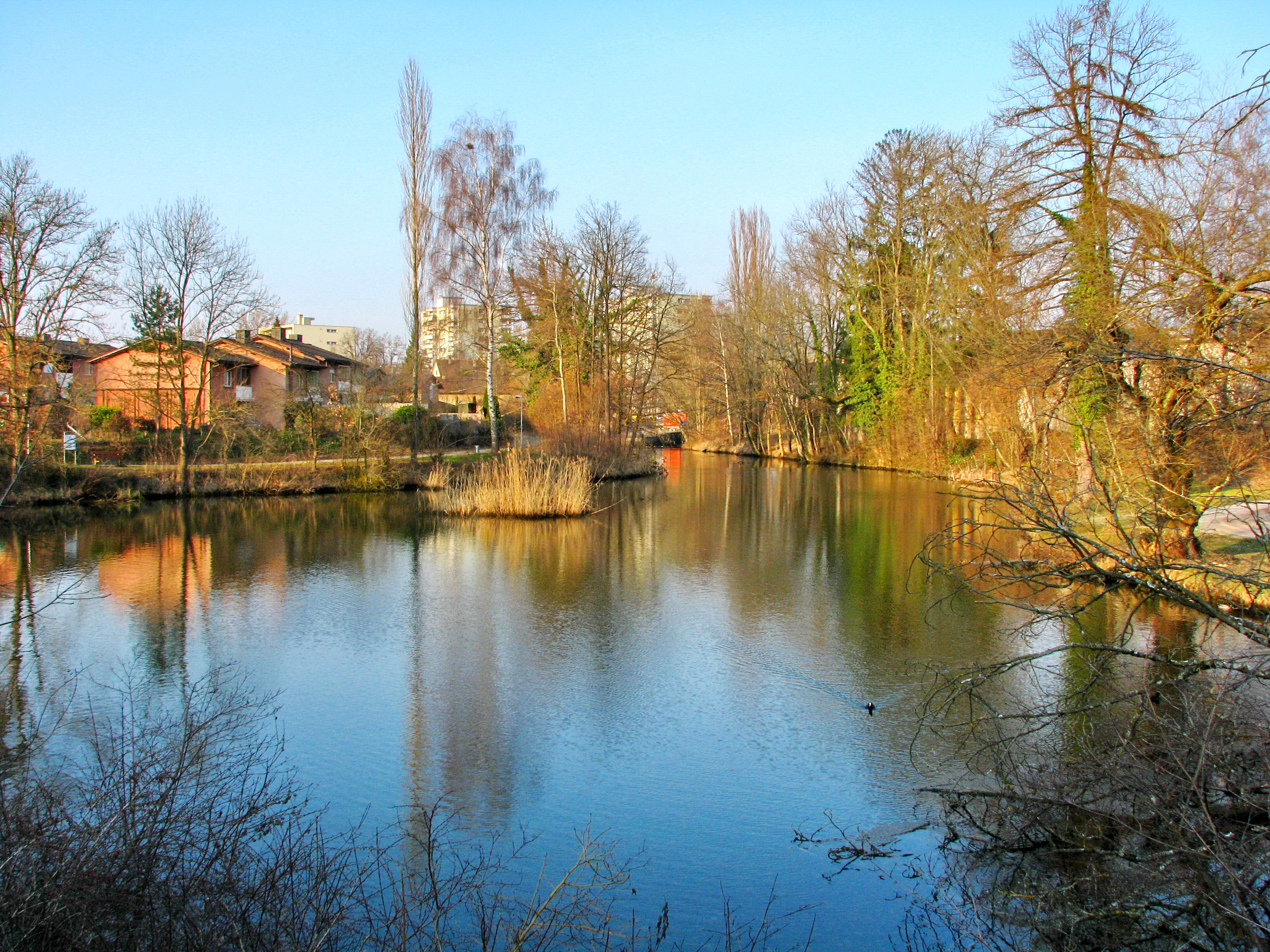
Aabach reservoir in Wetzikon

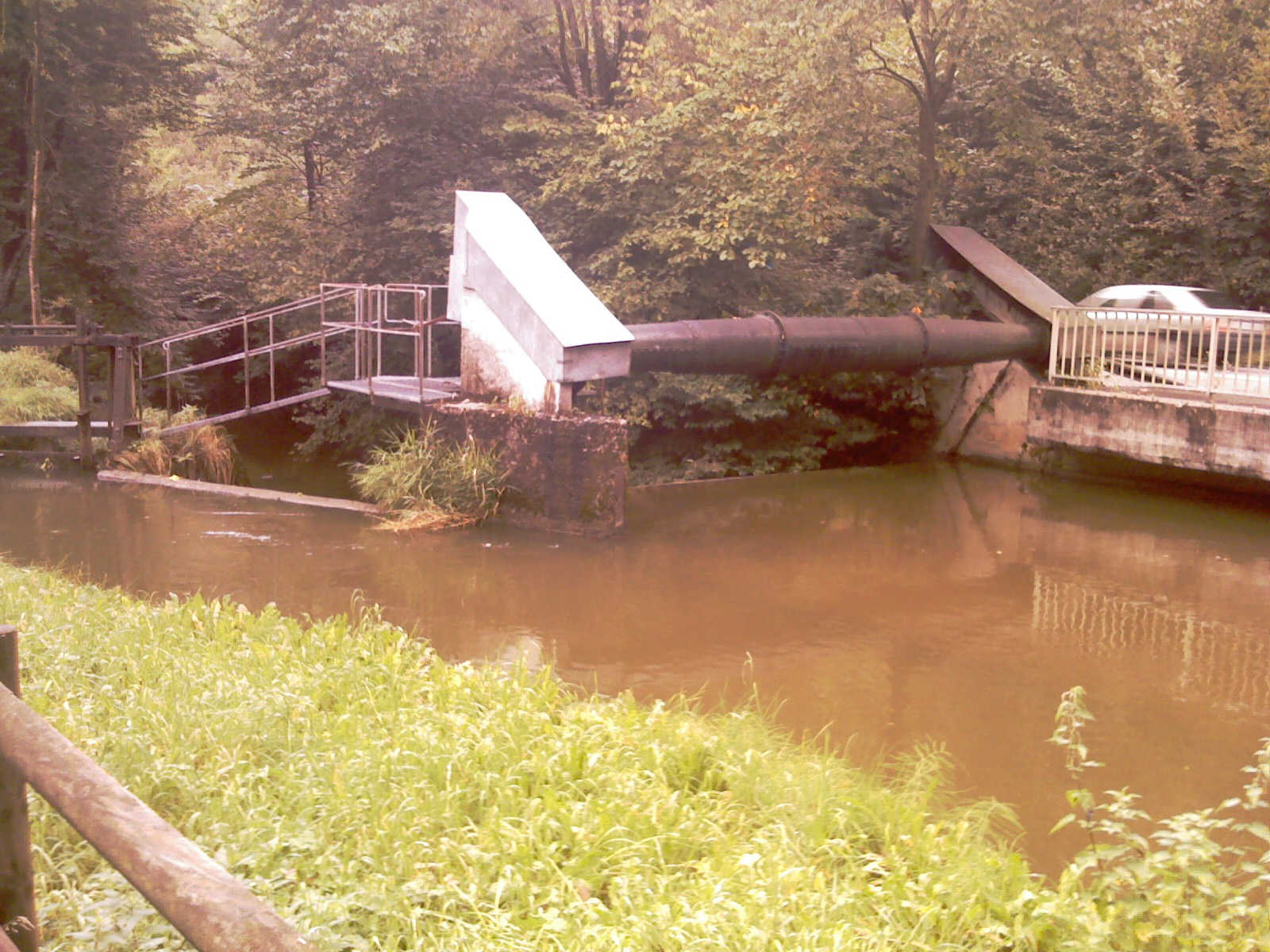
Aabach nearby Aathal-Seegräben (Aa Valley)

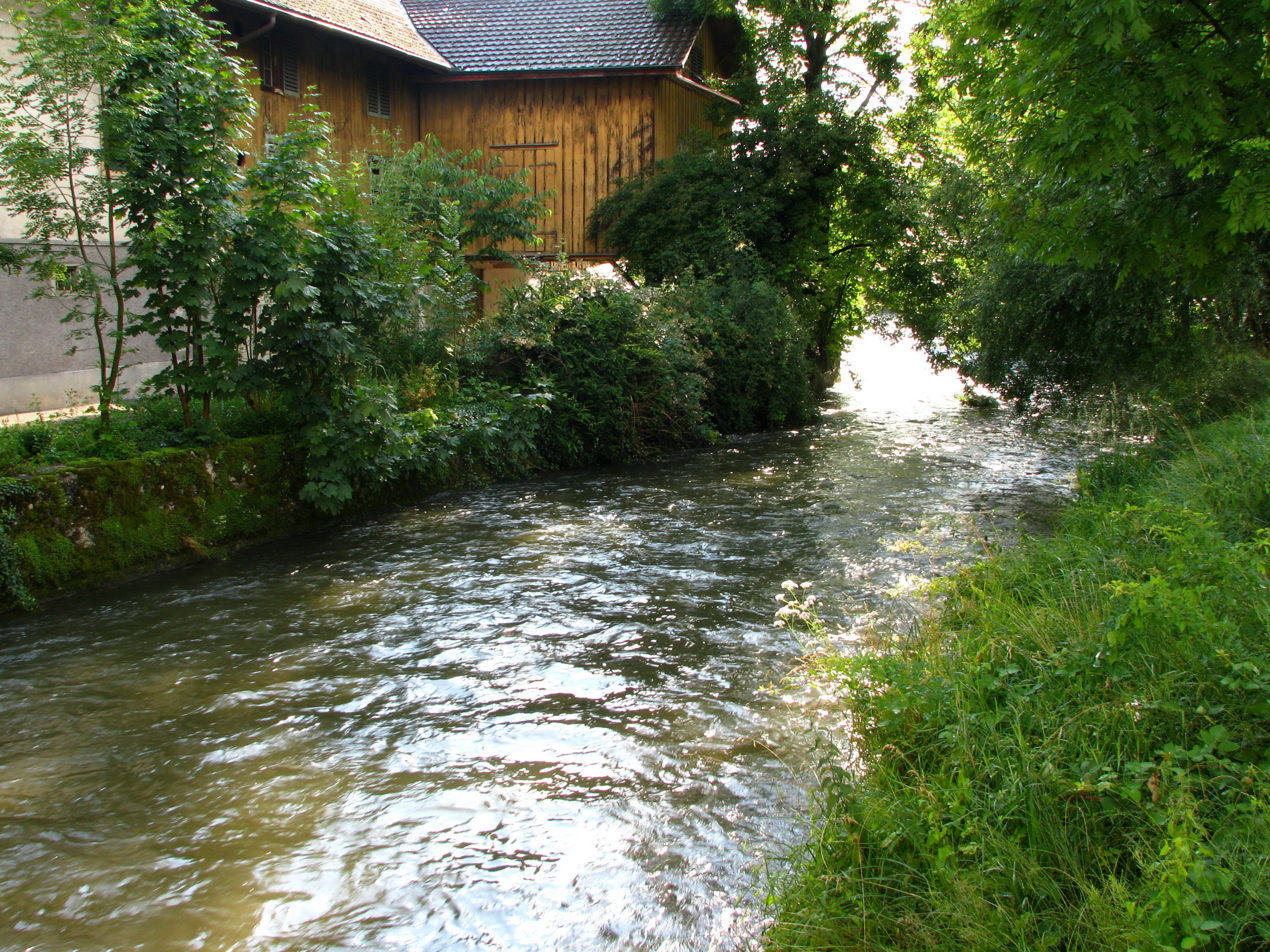
Ustermer Aa in Uster

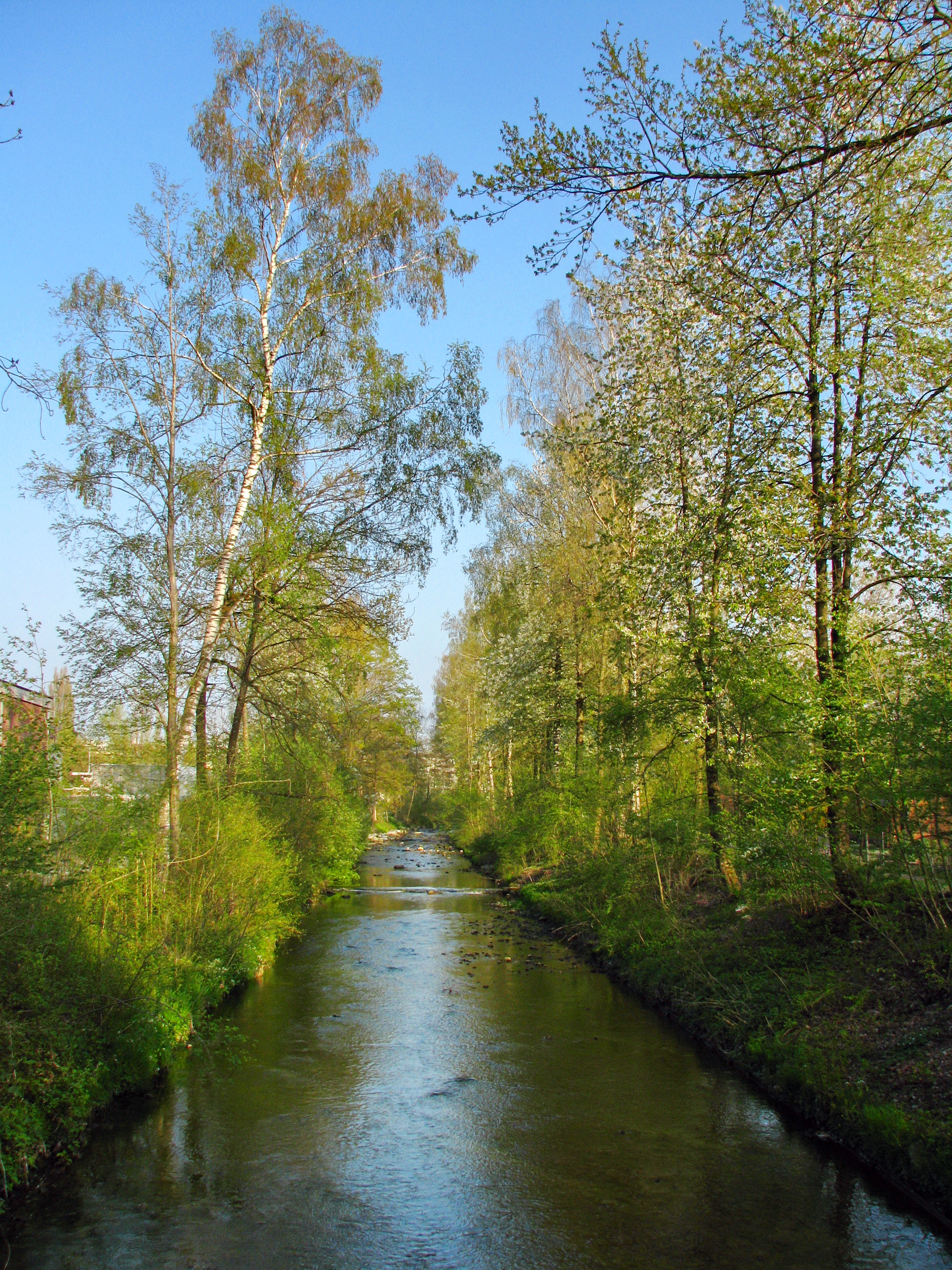
Ustermer Aa on Lake Greifen

== See also ==
- List of rivers of Switzerland
