= St. Francis's Church, Wetzikon =

Swiss church

Saint Francis's Church
- St. Franzikus
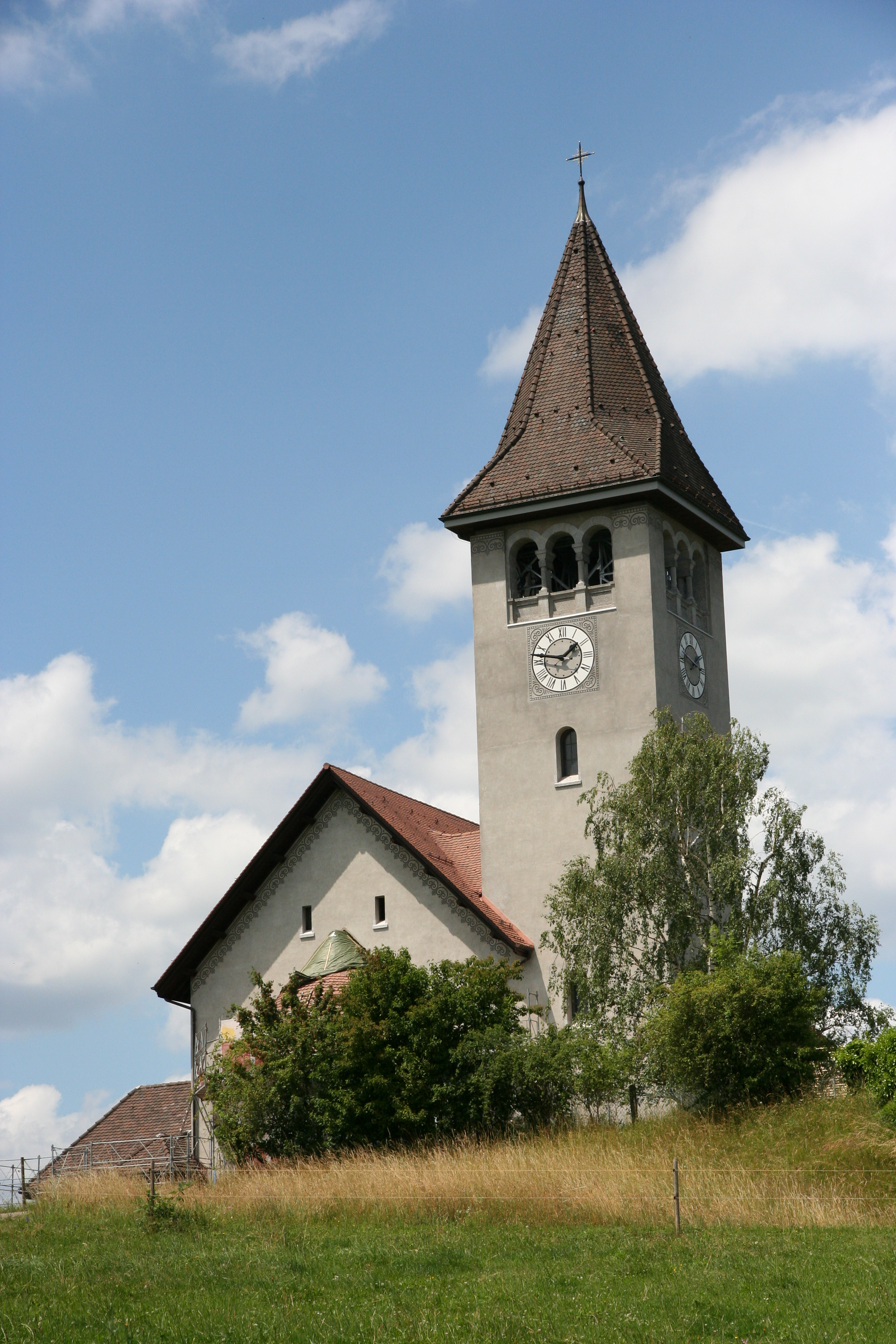

- Location in Switzerland
- 47°19′24″N 8°47′24.5″E
- Location: Wetzikon
- Country: Switzerland
- Denomination: Roman Catholic

History
- Dedication: Francis of Assisi

Architecture
- Style: Romanesque Revival
- Years built: 1924

The Church of Saint Francis is a Roman Catholic parish church located in Wetzikon, Switzerland.

== History ==
Christianity was first brought to modern-day Switzerland's Zürcher Oberland by the Roman Empire, who built the region's first Christian church at Irgenhausen Castrum on the Pfäffikersee. After the collapse of the Roman Empire, Christianity returned to eastern Switzerland because of the work of the monks Gallus and Columbanus. The first church in Wetzikon, perhaps mentioned in a document from 857, was destroyed by fire in 1320. The township replaced it a decade later, but it was under the control of the Abbey of Saint Gall. Worship in the Catholic rite was forbidden in 1524 in the wake of the Swiss Reformation and it henceforth became Protestant, and then Wetzikon fell under the control of Zürich in 1563. From 1711 to 1713, the construction of the town's present Reformed church took place.

== Construction and use ==
Beginning in 1923 and lasting into 1924, the current church building was constructed by Josef Steiner, who designed Saint Francis's after earlier Romanesque churches. A smallscale renovation took place in 1966, and in 1975 a pipe organ was added.

In 2013–14, Saint Francis's underwent a total remodeling carried out by Frank Roskothen, Pius Bieri, and Barbara Ziegenfuss.
