= Greifensee (lake) =

Lake in Switzerland

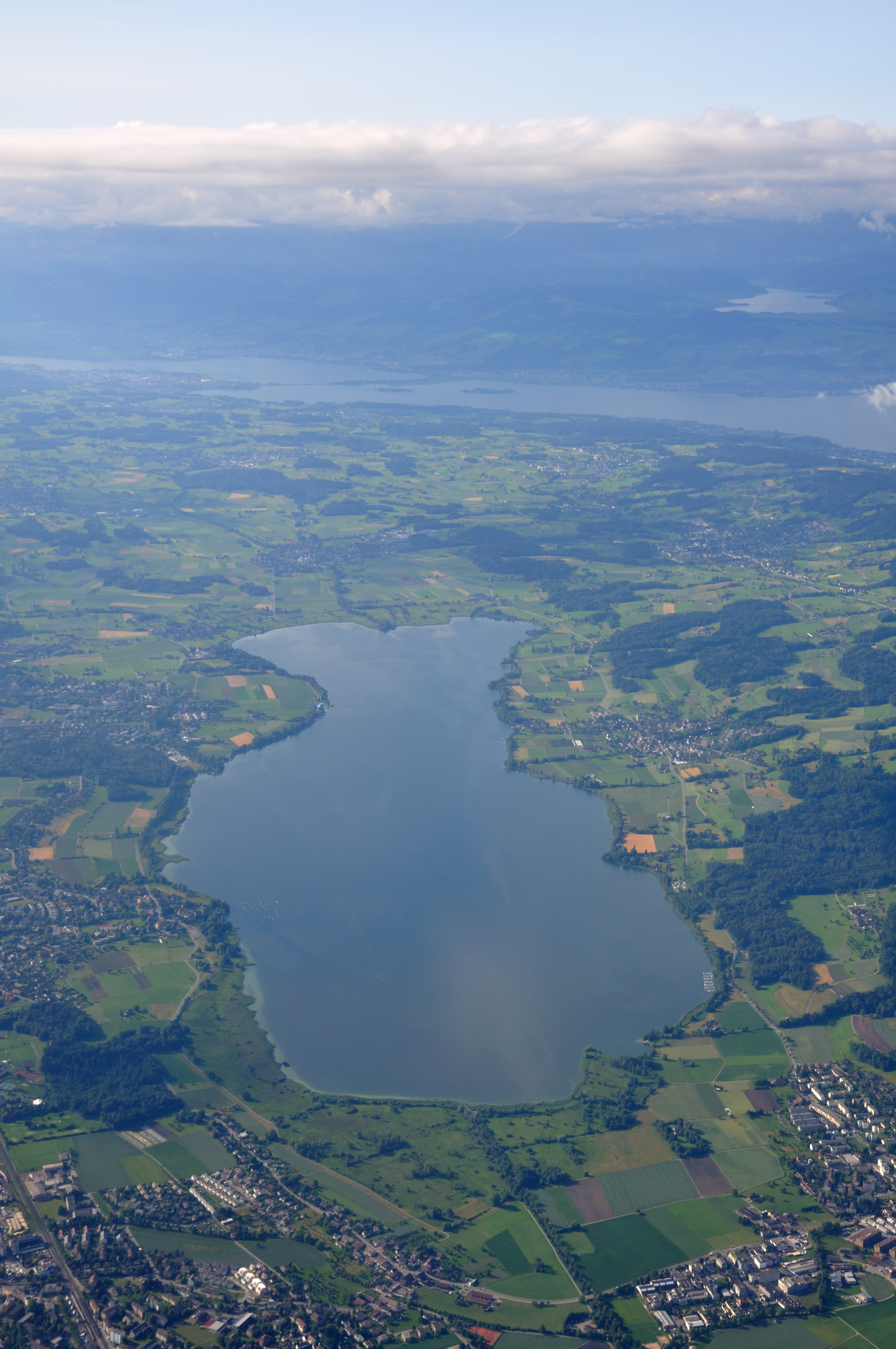
- View from north

- Location within Canton of Zürich Location within Switzerland Location within Alps
- Interactive map of Greifensee
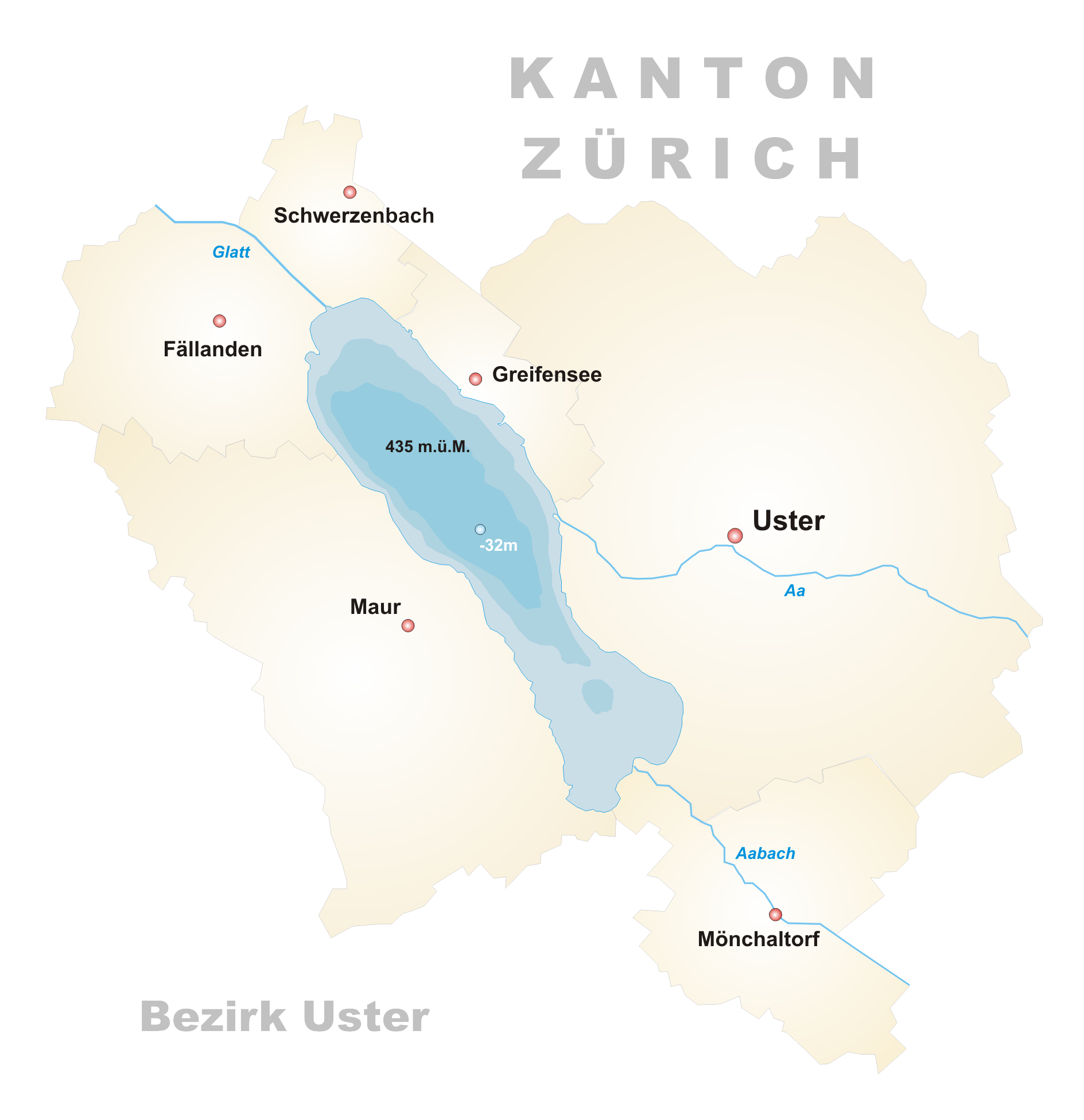
- Map of Greifensee
- Location: Canton of Zürich
- Coordinates: 47°21′N 8°41′E
- Lake type: eutrophic
- Primary inflows: (Mönchaltorfer) Aa, Aabach
- Primary outflows: Glatt
- Catchment area: 160 square kilometers (62 sq mi)
- Basin countries: Switzerland
- Max. length: 6 km (3.7 mi)
- Max. width: 1.6 km (0.99 mi)
- Surface area: 8.45 square kilometers (3.26 sq mi)
- Average depth: 18 m (59 ft)
- Max. depth: 32 m (105 ft)
- Water volume: 0.148 km^{3} (120,000 acre⋅ft)
- Residence time: 408 days
- Surface elevation: 435 m (1,427 ft)
- Settlements: Maur, Niederuster, Fällanden, Mönchaltorf and the town Greifensee

Greifensee (Swiss Standard German pronunciation: [ˈɡraɪfn̩ˌseː]) is a natural lake in the canton of Zürich in Switzerland.

== Geography ==
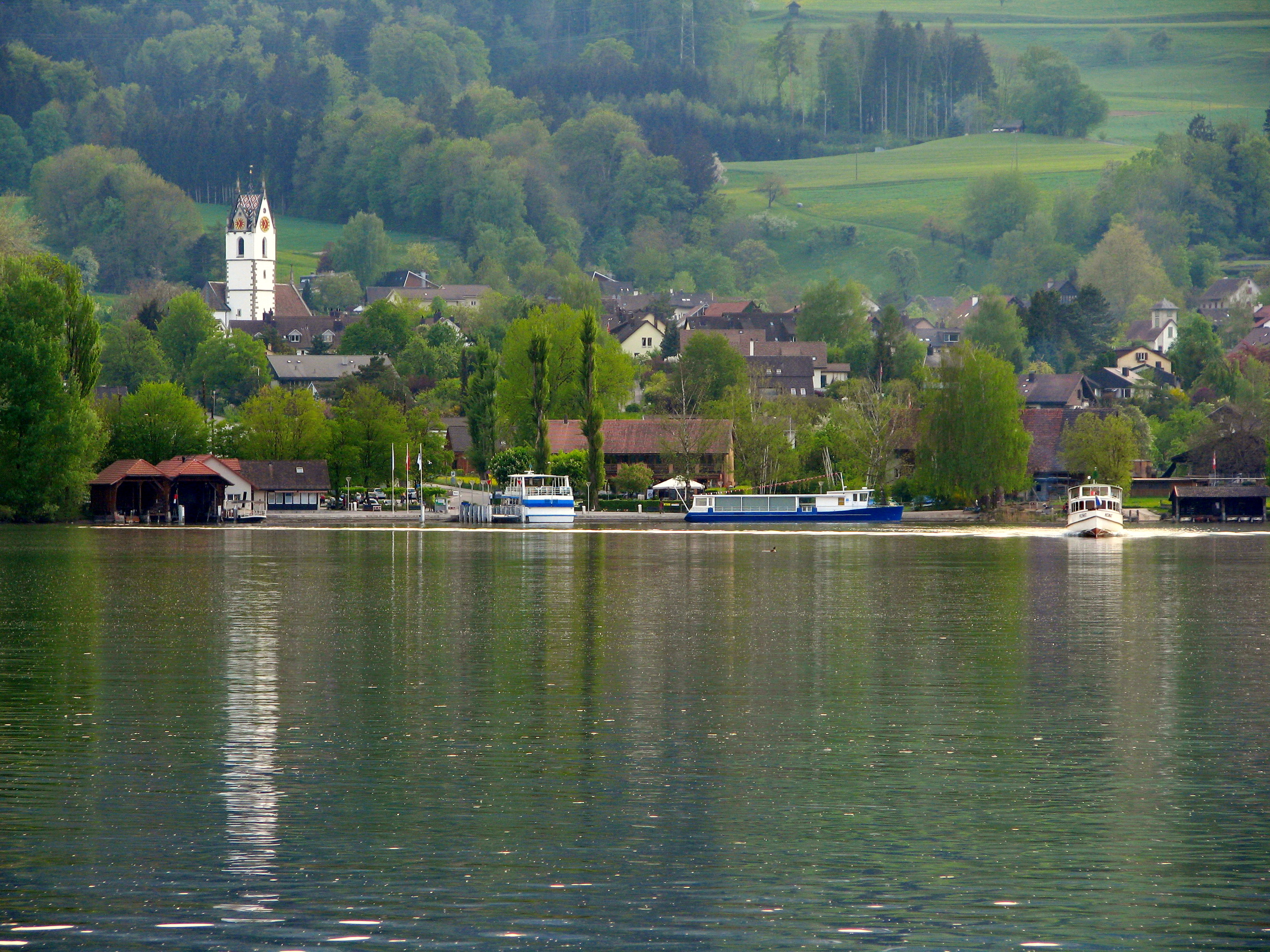
Greifensee as seen from Greifensee ZH, Maur and Pfannenstiel in the background

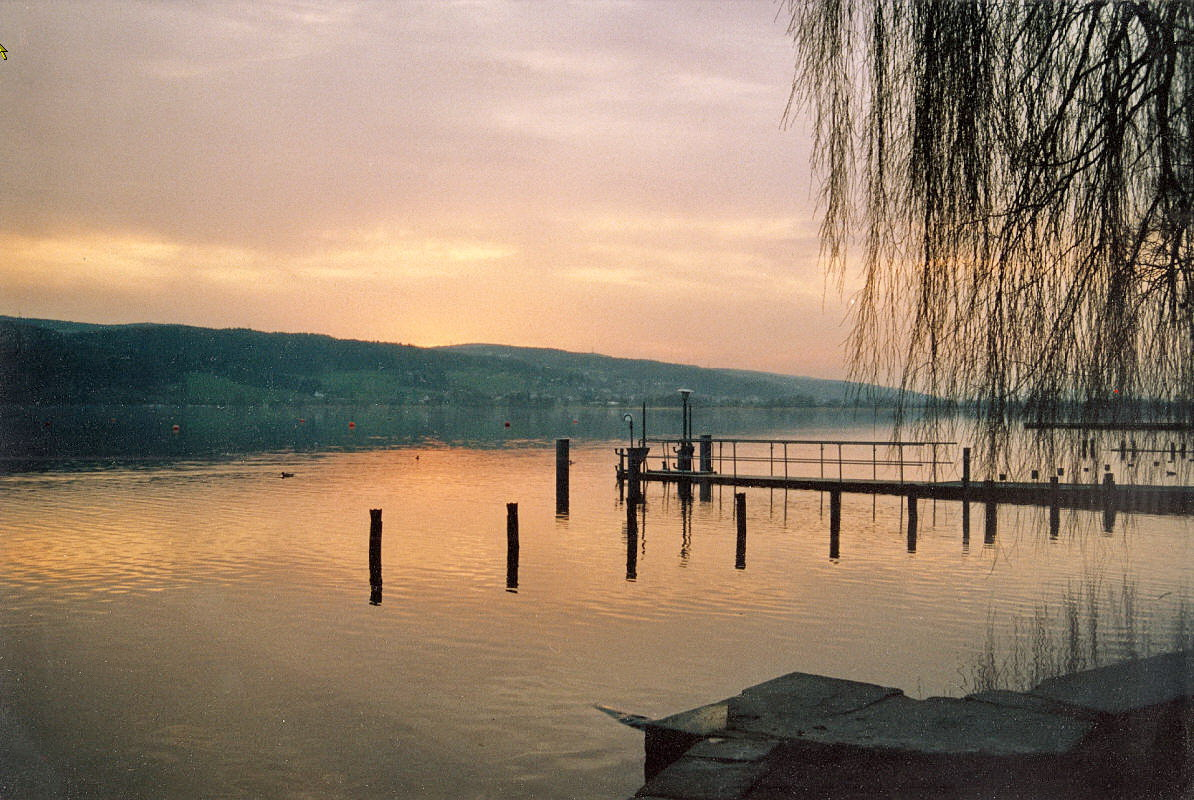
Greifensee harbour

Greifensee is located 11 km (6.8 mi) to the east of the city of Zürich, separated by the Pfannenstiel from Lake Zurich. As the second largest lake in the canton of Zürich (Lake Zurich being the largest), it is about 6 km (3.7 mi) long and 1.6 km (0.99 mi) at the widest point, with a maximum depth of 32 m (105 ft). The Aabach (Greifensee) (or just Aa) is the main supplying river, while its outlet is the Glatt. On its southeastern end the Mönchaltorfer Aa (or just Aa) enters the Greifensee.

== Nature ==
The lakeside is under UNESCO protection, and buildings are not allowed, resulting in reed bed and a rich fauna and flora: Around 400 plant species in the lake and 19 species in its tributaries. The nature reserves are important for the birds breeding there including more than 120 migratory species.

== Cultural heritage ==
The lake was known as Glattsee (after the Glatt) in the medieval times Greifensee (Grifense) was at first the name of the fort built by the counts of Rapperswil in the 12th century, recorded as the name of the bailiwick in 1260. This was adopted as the name of the lake by the 16th century.

Located on the banks, the Prehistoric pile dwelling settlement Greifensee–Storen–Wildsberg is part of the 56 Swiss sites of the UNESCO World Heritage Site Prehistoric pile dwellings around the Alps, and the settlement is also listed in the Swiss inventory of cultural property of national and regional significance as a Class object. Because the lake has grown in size over time, the original piles are now around 4 metres (13 ft) to 7 metres (23 ft) under the water level of 406 metres (1,332 ft).

The noted Swiss author Robert Walser wrote a short literary piece or feuilleton about the lake which was published in 1898, titled “Greifen Lake.” The story is re-published in English in the collections A Schoolboy's Diary and Masquerade and Other Stories. In the short story, the narrator chooses to visit Greifen Lake rather than the bigger famous Zurich Lake.

== See also ==
- List of lakes of Switzerland
