= List of cultural property of national significance in Switzerland: Schaffhausen =

This list contains all cultural property of national significance (class A) in the canton of Schaffhausen from the 2009 Swiss Inventory of Cultural Property of National and Regional Significance. It is sorted by municipality and contains 47 individual buildings, 7 collections and 18 archaeological finds.

The geographic coordinates provided are in the Swiss coordinate system as given in the Inventory.

== Dörflingen ==
| KGS No.^{?} | Picture | Name | Street Address | CH1903 X coordinate | CH1903 Y coordinate | Location |
|---|---|---|---|---|---|---|
| Unknown | | ISOS Dorf: Dörflingen | | | | |

== Gächlingen ==
| KGS No.^{?} | Picture | Name | Street Address | CH1903 X coordinate | CH1903 Y coordinate | Location |
|---|---|---|---|---|---|---|
| 9657 | | Goldäcker, Neolithic Settlement | | 679.200 | 283.950 | 47.701369°N 8.493774°E |
| Unknown | | ISOS Dorf: Gächlingen | | | | |

== Hallau ==
| KGS No.^{?} | Picture | Name | Street Address | CH1903 X coordinate | CH1903 Y coordinate | Location |
|---|---|---|---|---|---|---|
| 4328 | Hilltop Church of St. Moritz | Hilltop Church of St. Moritz | | 676.742 | 284.030 | 47.702381°N 8.461044°E |
| Unknown | | ISOS Dorf: Hallau | | | | |

== Hemishofen ==
| KGS No.^{?} | Picture | Name | Street Address | CH1903 X coordinate | CH1903 Y coordinate | Location |
|---|---|---|---|---|---|---|
| 9658 | | Sankert, Iron Age Burial Mound Group | | 704.350 | 282.800 | 47.687505°N 8.828503°E |

== Lohn ==
| KGS No.^{?} | Picture | Name | Street Address | CH1903 X coordinate | CH1903 Y coordinate | Location |
|---|---|---|---|---|---|---|
| Unknown | | ISOS Dorf: Lohn (SH) | | | | |

== Löhningen ==
| KGS No.^{?} | Picture | Name | Street Address | CH1903 X coordinate | CH1903 Y coordinate | Location |
|---|---|---|---|---|---|---|
| Unknown | | ISOS Dorf: Löhningen | | | | |

== Merishausen ==
| KGS No.^{?} | Picture | Name | Street Address | CH1903 X coordinate | CH1903 Y coordinate | Location |
|---|---|---|---|---|---|---|
| 9736 | | Parish Church's Barn | Kirchgasse | 687.640 | 290.609 | 47.760173°N 8.60752°E |
| Unknown | | ISOS Dorf: Merishausen | | | | |

== Neuhausen am Rheinfall ==
| KGS No.^{?} | Picture | Name | Street Address | CH1903 X coordinate | CH1903 Y coordinate | Location |
|---|---|---|---|---|---|---|
| 4345 | Villa Charlottenfels | Villa Charlottenfels | Charlottenweg 2 | 688.795 | 282.877 | 47.69049°N 8.62137°E |

== Neunkirch ==
| KGS No.^{?} | Picture | Name | Street Address | CH1903 X coordinate | CH1903 Y coordinate | Location |
|---|---|---|---|---|---|---|
| 9659 | | Old City, Medieval / Early Modern City | | 679.600 | 282.700 | 47.69008°N 8.498877°E |
| 10157 | | City Walls | | 679.740 | 282.800 | 47.690962°N 8.50076°E |
| Unknown | | ISOS Kleinstadt / Flecken: Neunkirch | | | | |

== Oberhallau ==
| KGS No.^{?} | Picture | Name | Street Address | CH1903 X coordinate | CH1903 Y coordinate | Location |
|---|---|---|---|---|---|---|
| 9660 | | Überhürst, Neolithic Graves | | 677.930 | 283.700 | 47.699273°N 8.476812°E |
| Unknown | | ISOS Dorf: Oberhallau | | | | |

== Ramsen ==
| KGS No.^{?} | Picture | Name | Street Address | CH1903 X coordinate | CH1903 Y coordinate | Location |
|---|---|---|---|---|---|---|
| 4363 | Bibernhofgut (Mill on the Biber River) | Bibernhofgut (Mill on the Biber River) | Bibermühle 3 | 702.594 | 281.913 | 47.679807°N 8.804913°E |
| Unknown | | ISOS Dorf: Ramsen | | | | |
| Unknown | | ISOS Spezialfall: Bibermühle | | | | |

== Rüdlingen ==
| KGS No.^{?} | Picture | Name | Street Address | CH1903 X coordinate | CH1903 Y coordinate | Location |
|---|---|---|---|---|---|---|
| Unknown | | ISOS Dorf: Rüdlingen | | | | |

== Schaffhausen ==
| KGS No.^{?} | Picture | Name | Street Address | CH1903 X coordinate | CH1903 Y coordinate | Location |
|---|---|---|---|---|---|---|
| 4369 | Old Armory (Now City Administration Building) | Old Armory (Now City Administration Building) | Beckenstube 7 | 689.774 | 283.417 | 47.695212°N 8.634517°E |
| 9661 | Old City, Medieval / Early Modern City | Old City, Medieval / Early Modern City | | 689.800 | 283.550 | 47.696405°N 8.634891°E |
| 4395 | | Bach School House | Bachstrasse 62 | 689.918 | 283.851 | 47.699095°N 8.636523°E |
| 4372 | Doppelhaus Wasserquelle and Zieglerburg | Doppelhaus Wasserquelle and Zieglerburg | Vordergasse 26, 28 | 689.966 | 283.534 | 47.696238°N 8.637098°E |
| 4373 | Former Benedictine Kloster Allerheiligen Schaffhausen (German: Allerheiligen) | Former Benedictine Kloster Allerheiligen Schaffhausen (German: Allerheiligen) | Münsterplatz | 689.900 | 283.400 | 47.695042°N 8.636192°E |
| 9286 | | Former Kammgarnspinnerei | Baumgartenstrasse 19 | 689.898 | 283.345 | 47.694548°N 8.636154°E |
| 4374 | Fronwagturm | Fronwagturm | Fronwagplatz 4 | 689.682 | 283.543 | 47.696358°N 8.633317°E |
| 9040 | | Giesserei +GF+ | Werk I, Mühlentalstrasse 78 | 689.410 | 284.378 | 47.703904°N 8.629863°E |
| 8878/extendedHtmlPopup 4376, 8878 | | Grosses Haus and City Archives of Schaffhausen | Fronwagplatz 24 | 689.709 | 283.643 | 47.697254°N 8.633697°E |
| 4404 | Haber House | Haber House | Neustadt 51 | 689.588 | 283.430 | 47.695355°N 8.632043°E |
| 8502 | Hallen für neue Kunst | Hallen für neue Kunst | Baumgartenstrasse 23 | 689.846 | 283.307 | 47.694213°N 8.635454°E |
| 4377 | House zum Goldenen Ochsen | House zum Goldenen Ochsen | Vorstadt 17 | 689.722 | 283.732 | 47.698052°N 8.633889°E |
| 4378 | House zum Korallenbaum | House zum Korallenbaum | Herrenacker 2 | 689.740 | 283.430 | 47.695334°N 8.634067°E |
| 4379 | | House zum Luchs | Herrenacker 9 | 689.654 | 283.415 | 47.695211°N 8.632919°E |
| 4380 | House zum Ritter | House zum Ritter | Vordergasse 65 | 689.797 | 283.526 | 47.696189°N 8.634846°E |
| 4381 | House zum Steinbock | House zum Steinbock | Oberstadt 16 | 689.622 | 283.578 | 47.696681°N 8.632525°E |
| 4382 | | Herblingen, Grüthalde, Neolithic Settlement | | 692.910 | 287.850 | 47.734637°N 8.677217°E |
| 4434 | Kaufleutstube | Kaufleutstube | Vordergasse 58 | 689.816 | 283.600 | 47.696852°N 8.635114°E |
| 4385 | Church of St. Johann | Church of St. Johann | Vordergasse | 689.890 | 283.560 | 47.696482°N 8.636091°E |
| 8800 | | Company Archives of Georg Fischer AG | Amsler-Laffon-Strasse 9 | 690.446 | 284.894 | 47.708401°N 8.64377°E |
| 4383 | Korn- und Kaufhaus | Korn- und Kaufhaus | Herrenacker 15 | 689.621 | 283.450 | 47.69553°N 8.632486°E |
| 11703/extendedHtmlPopup 8503, 11703 | Museum zu Allerheiligen and Cantonal Archeological Collection | Museum zu Allerheiligen and Cantonal Archeological Collection | Klosterstrasse | 689.861 | 283.390 | 47.694958°N 8.635671°E |
| 4387 | Rathaus (Town council house) and Archive with Schatzgewölbe | Rathaus (Town council house) and Archive with Schatzgewölbe | Vordergasse 73 | 689.752 | 283.513 | 47.696079°N 8.634244°E |
| 4388 | Schweizersbild, Paleolithic Wohnhöhle | Schweizersbild, Paleolithic Wohnhöhle | | 690.130 | 286.610 | 47.723875°N 8.639909°E |
| 4389 | | Sonnenburggut | Sonnenburggutstrasse 53 | 688.628 | 283.904 | 47.699748°N 8.619351°E |
| 8817 | | State Archives of Schaffhausen | Rathausbogen 4 | 689.750 | 283.480 | 47.695782°N 8.63421°E |
| 10160 | City Walls | City Walls | | 689.000 | 283.600 | 47.696964°N 8.624245°E |
| 9344 | City Library of Schaffhausen | City Library of Schaffhausen | Münsterplatz 1 | 689.962 | 283.440 | 47.695393°N 8.637026°E |
| 4392 | Stadthaus (Haus zur Freudenquelle) | Stadthaus (Haus zur Freudenquelle) | Krummgasse 2 | 689.765 | 283.616 | 47.697003°N 8.634438°E |
| 10450 | Waldfriedhof | Waldfriedhof | Rheinhardstrasse | 691.016 | 284.880 | 47.708197°N 8.65136°E |
| 4375 | | Herrenstube Guildhouse | Fronwagplatz 3 | 689.690 | 283.539 | 47.696321°N 8.633423°E |
| 4394 | Schmiedstube Guildhouse | Schmiedstube Guildhouse | Vordergasse 61 | 689.821 | 283.525 | 47.696177°N 8.635165°E |
| 4433 | Zum Rüden Guildhouse | Zum Rüden Guildhouse | Oberstadt 20 | 689.597 | 283.581 | 47.696711°N 8.632193°E |
| 4393 | Zur Gerberstube Guildhouse | Zur Gerberstube Guildhouse | Bachstrasse 8 | 690.067 | 283.514 | 47.696044°N 8.63844°E |
| Unknown | | ISOS Stadt: Schaffhausen | | | | |

== Schleitheim ==
| KGS No.^{?} | Picture | Name | Street Address | CH1903 X coordinate | CH1903 Y coordinate | Location |
|---|---|---|---|---|---|---|
| 9662 | | Hebsack, Early Medieval Graves | | 678.525 | 288.900 | 47.745962°N 8.485661°E |
| 4437 | Juliomagus, Roman era Vicus | Juliomagus, Roman era Vicus | | 678.150 | 288.350 | 47.741061°N 8.480564°E |
| 9663 | | Vorholz, Roman era Building | | 680.080 | 290.440 | 47.759622°N 8.506671°E |
| Unknown | | ISOS Dorf: Schleitheim | | | | |

== Siblingen ==
| KGS No.^{?} | Picture | Name | Street Address | CH1903 X coordinate | CH1903 Y coordinate | Location |
|---|---|---|---|---|---|---|
| Unknown | | Auf dem Stein, Early La Tène Culture (?) Graves | | | | |

== Stein am Rhein ==
| KGS No.^{?} | Picture | Name | Street Address | CH1903 X coordinate | CH1903 Y coordinate | Location |
|---|---|---|---|---|---|---|
| 4447 | Hohenklingen Castle | Hohenklingen Castle | Hohenklingen 1 | 706.622 | 280.547 | 47.666881°N 8.858216°E |
| 10554 | Burg, Late-Roman era Castle | Burg, Late-Roman era Castle | | 706.650 | 279.350 | 47.656113°N 8.858301°E |
| 4456 | Former Monastery Church of St. Georg | Former Monastery Church of St. Georg | Chirchhofplatz 10 | 706.792 | 279.656 | 47.658841°N 8.860264°E |
| 4448 | Former Benedictine Abbey of St. Georgen | Former Benedictine Abbey of St. Georgen | | 706.771 | 279.644 | 47.658737°N 8.859982°E |
| 4451 | Former Gasthaus (Combination Hotel and Restaurant) Rother Ochsen | Former Gasthaus (Combination Hotel and Restaurant) Rother Ochsen | Rathausplatz 9 | 706.707 | 279.701 | 47.65926°N 8.859144°E |
| 4449 | Haus Neubu | Haus Neubu | Bärengass 7 | 706.663 | 279.678 | 47.65906°N 8.858553°E |
| 4450 | Haus zum Lindwurm | Haus zum Lindwurm | Understadt 18 | 706.643 | 279.848 | 47.660592°N 8.858327°E |
| 4454 | Haus zum Weissen Adler | Haus zum Weissen Adler | Oberstadt 1 | 706.754 | 279.726 | 47.659477°N 8.859775°E |
| 4455 | Haus zur Vorderen Krone | Haus zur Vorderen Krone | Rathausplatz 7 | 706.712 | 279.695 | 47.659205°N 8.859209°E |
| 4458 | Auf Burg Church | Auf Burg Church | Hohenklingen 4 | 706.680 | 279.400 | 47.656558°N 8.858712°E |
| 4457 | Rathaus (Town council house) | Rathaus (Town council house) | Rathausplatz 1 | 706.749 | 279.699 | 47.659235°N 8.859702°E |
| 10162 | City Fortifications | City Fortifications | | 706.700 | 279.800 | 47.660151°N 8.859074°E |
| Unknown | | ISOS Kleinstadt / Flecken: Stein am Rhein | | | | |

== Stetten ==
| KGS No.^{?} | Picture | Name | Street Address | CH1903 X coordinate | CH1903 Y coordinate | Location |
|---|---|---|---|---|---|---|
| 4467 | Herblingen Castle | Herblingen Castle | | 691.704 | 287.715 | 47.733593°N 8.661114°E |

== Thayngen ==
| KGS No.^{?} | Picture | Name | Street Address | CH1903 X coordinate | CH1903 Y coordinate | Location |
|---|---|---|---|---|---|---|
| 4472 | Haus Zum Hirzen | Haus Zum Hirzen | Schulstrasse 3 | 695.357 | 289.389 | 47.748124°N 8.710164°E |
| 4473 | | Haus zum Rebstock | Im Oberhof 4 | 695.503 | 289.356 | 47.747806°N 8.712104°E |
| 4469 | Kesslerloch, Paleolithic Cave | Kesslerloch, Paleolithic Cave | | 694.100 | 289.050 | 47.745257°N 8.693333°E |
| 4468 | | Weier, Neolithic Shore Front Settlement | | 694.950 | 288.050 | 47.736143°N 8.70445°E |
| Unknown | | ISOS Verstädtertes Dorf: Thayngen | | | | |

== Wilchingen ==
| KGS No.^{?} | Picture | Name | Street Address | CH1903 X coordinate | CH1903 Y coordinate | Location |
|---|---|---|---|---|---|---|
| 4479 | | Flühhalde, Neolithic Hilltop Settlement | | 677.930 | 279.715 | 47.663438°N 8.476111°E |
| 4362 | | Trottenhaus | Osterfingen | 678.520 | 279.800 | 47.664132°N 8.483979°E |
| 4361 | | House (with Bath) | Osterfingen | 678.534 | 278.969 | 47.656657°N 8.484019°E |
| Unknown | | ISOS Dorf: Osterfingen | | | | |
| Unknown | | ISOS Dorf: Wilchingen | | | | |
