= Singen (electoral district) =

State electoral district of Germany

57: Singen
- Electoral district for the Landtag of Baden-Württemberg
- Singen in 2026
- District: Konstanz
- Electorate: 103,041 (2026)
- Major settlements: Aach, Bodman-Ludwigshafen, Büsingen am Hochrhein, Gottmadingen, Hilzingen, Hohenfels, Mühlhausen-Ehingen, Mühlingen, Orsingen-Nenzingen, Rielasingen-Worblingen, Singen, Steißlingen, Stockach, Tengen, and Volkertshausen

Current electoral district
- Party: CDU
- Member: Christoph Stetter

Singen is an electoral constituency (German: Wahlkreis) represented in the Landtag of Baden-Württemberg.

Since 2026, it has elected one member via first-past-the-post voting. Voters cast a second vote under which additional seats are allocated proportionally state-wide. Under the constituency numbering system, it is designated as constituency 57.

It is wholly within the district of Konstanz.

== Geography ==
The constituency includes the municipalities of Aach, Bodman-Ludwigshafen, Büsingen am Hochrhein, Gottmadingen, Hilzingen, Hohenfels, Mühlhausen-Ehingen, Mühlingen, Orsingen-Nenzingen, Rielasingen-Worblingen, Singen, Steißlingen, Stockach, Tengen, and Volkertshausen within the district of Konstanz.

There were 102,441 eligible voters in 2026.

== Members ==
=== First mandate ===
Both prior to and since the electoral reforms for the 2026 election, the winner of the plurality of the vote (first-past-the-post) in every constituency won the first mandate.

Election	Member	Party	%
1976	Robert Maus	CDU	
1980	Robert Maus	CDU	
1984	Robert Maus	CDU	
1988	Robert Maus	CDU	
1992	Robert Maus	CDU	
1996	Veronika Netzhammer	CDU	
2001	Veronika Netzhammer	CDU	48.7
2006	Veronika Netzhammer	CDU	47.2
2011	Wolfgang Reuther	CDU	40.1
2016	Dorothea Wehinger	Grüne	28.8
2021	Dorothea Wehinger	Grüne	32.1
Sep 2024	Saskia Frank	Grüne	32.1
2026	Christoph Stetter	CDU	36.2

=== Second mandate ===
Prior to the electoral reforms for the 2026 election, the seats in the state parliament were allocated proportionately amongst parties which received more than 5% of valid votes across the state. The seats that were won proportionally for parties that did not win as many first mandates as seats they were entitled to, were allocated to their candidates which received the highest proportion of the vote in their respective constituencies. This meant that following some elections, a constituency would have one or more members elected under a second mandate.

Prior to 2011, these second mandates were allocated to the party candidates who got the greatest number of votes, whilst from 2011-2021, these were allocated according to percentage share of the vote.

Prior to 2011, this constituency did not elect any members on a second mandate.

Election	Member	Party	Member	Party
2011	Hans-Peter Storz	SPD		
2016			Wolfgang Gedeon	AfD
Mar 2020			Wolfgang Gedeon	Ind
2021	Hans-Peter Storz	SPD	Bernhard Eisenhut	AfD

== Election results ==
=== 2026 election ===
State election (2026): Singen
Notes:	Blue background denotes the winner of the electorate vote. Pink background denotes a candidate elected from their party list. Yellow background denotes an electorate win by a list member, or other incumbent. A ✓ or ✗ denotes status of any incumbent, win or lose respectively.						
Party	Candidate	Votes	%	±%	Party votes	%	±%
CDU	Christoph Stetter	24,259	36.2	▲14.7	21,048	31.4	▲9.8
AfD	Bernhard Eisenhut	15,402	23.0	▲11.7	15,518	23.1	▲11.8
Greens	Saskia Frank	15,142	22.6	▼9.5	17,119	25.5	▼6.6
SPD	Giuliana Ionnidis	4,500	6.7	▼5.5	3,417	5.1	▼7.2
FDP	Nico Klemann	2,680	4.0	▼7.7	2,785	4.1	▼7.6
Left	John-Eric Löser	2,632	3.9	▲0.9	2,322	3.5	▲0.5
FW					1,294	1.9	▼1.1
BSW	René Frey	1,099	1.6		1,106	1.6	
Volt	Nils Carstensen	854	1.3		610	0.9	
APT					603	0.9	
PARTEI					331	0.5	▼1.4
Values	Ralph Schneider	426	0.6		237	0.4	
dieBasis					147	0.2	▼0.9
Pensioners					137	0.2	
Bündnis C					122	0.2	
ÖDP					118	0.2	▼0.4
Team Todenhöfer					65	0.1	
PdF					49	0.1	
Verjüngungsforschung					37	0.1	
Humanists					26	0.0	
KlimalisteBW					22	0.0	▼0.5
Informal votes		564			445		
Total valid votes		66,994			67,113		
Turnout		67,558	65.6	▲7.1			
CDU gain from Greens	Majority	8,857	13.2				

== See also ==
- Politics of Baden-Württemberg
- Landtag of Baden-Württemberg
