= Büttenhardt =

- Municipality
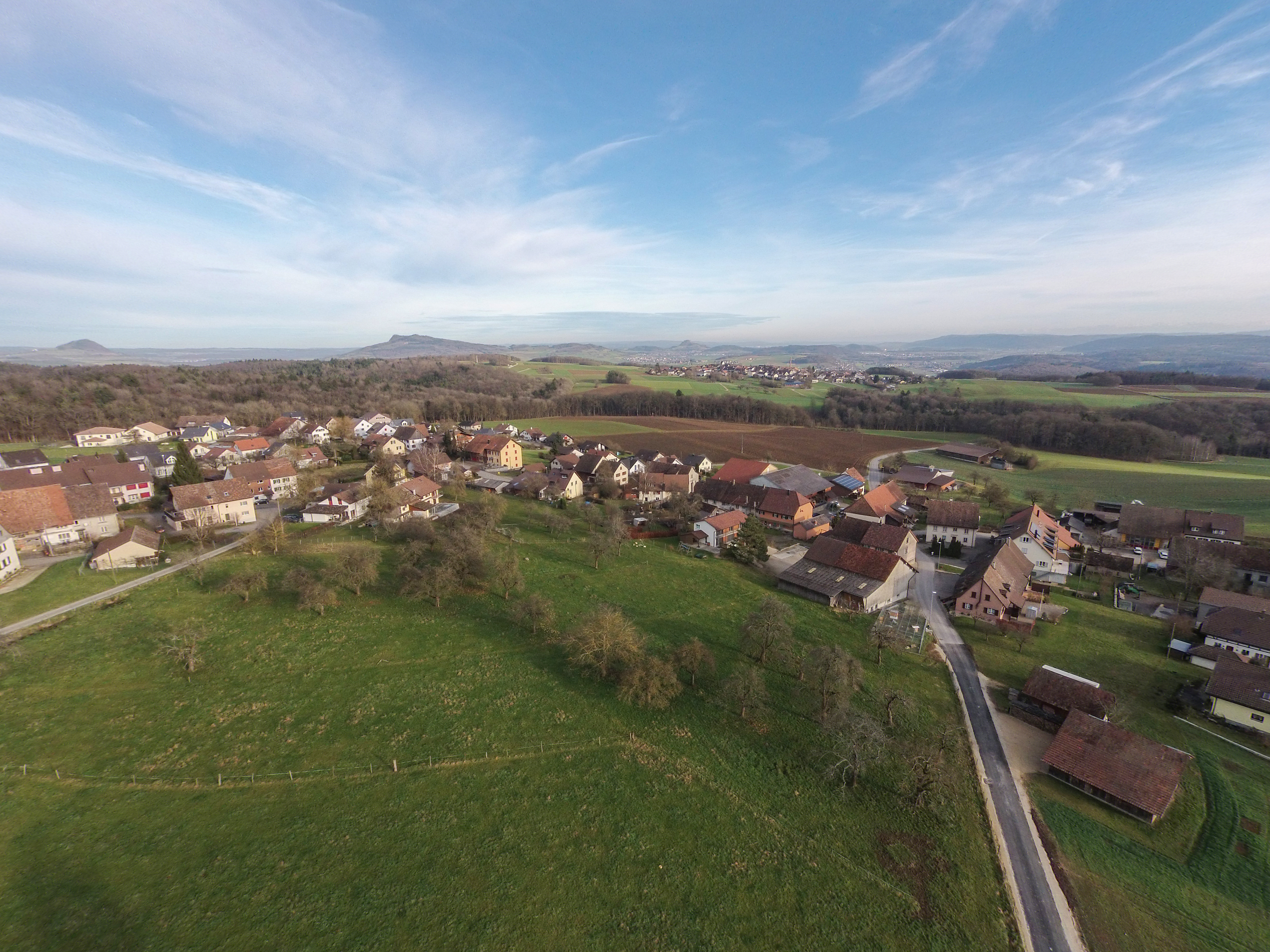

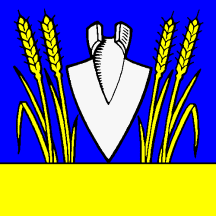
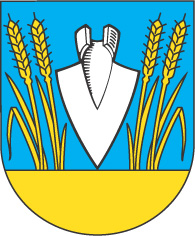
- Flag Coat of arms
- Location of Büttenhardt
- Location within Switzerland Location within Canton of Schaffhausen
- Coordinates: 47°45′N 8°39′E
- Country: Switzerland
- Canton: Schaffhausen
- District: n.a.

Area
  - Total: 4.00 km^{2} (1.54 sq mi)
- Elevation: 658 m (2,159 ft)

Population (2018-12-31)
  - Total: 423
  - Density: 106/km^{2} (274/sq mi)
- Time zone: UTC+01:00 (CET)
  - Summer (DST): UTC+02:00 (CEST)
- Postal code: 8236
- SFOS number: 2914
- ISO 3166 code: CH-SH
- Surrounded by: Lohn, Merishausen, Opfertshofen, Schaffhausen, Stetten, Tengen (DE-BW)
- Website: www.buettenhardt.ch

Büttenhardt (pronunciation: ˈbʏttənˌhaɐt) is a municipality in the canton of Schaffhausen in Switzerland.

== History ==
Aerial view (1948)

Büttenhardt is first mentioned in 1238 as Butinhart.

The village became part of Switzerland in the 14th century. The territory of the municipality of Büttenhardt today includes territory of Verenahof which formerly belonged to West Germany. Verenahof (also known as Büttenharter Hof or Verenahöfe) was a German exclave in Switzerland, administratively part of the West German town of Wiechs am Randen (which is now part of the town of Tengen). Geographically, it was separated from the rest of West Germany by a 200–300-metre wide strip of Swiss territory.

In 1964 a treaty was concluded between West Germany and Switzerland, which entered into force on 4 October 1967. The 43-hectare territory, containing three houses and fewer than a dozen people, became part of Switzerland with the transfer of 529,912 square metres (5,703,930 sq ft) of West German land parcels (that had administratively been part of the German towns of Konstanz, Öhningen, Rielasingen, Wiechs am Randen, Altenburg, Stühlingen, Weizen and Grimmelshofen) in exchange for the transfer to West Germany of an equal area of Swiss land parcels (which had administratively been part of the Swiss towns of Kreuzlingen, Hemishofen, Büttenhardt, Opfertshofen, and Merishausen).

Concurrently the exclave of Büsingen am Hochrhein continued to remain part of Germany administratively and politically and following the land swap involving Verenahof it is now the sole remaining exclave of Germany wholly surrounded by the territory of another country (Switzerland), whilst Verenahof now forms part of the Swiss municipality of Büttenhardt.

At the town hall in Wiechs am Randen there are some remaining border markers that became obsolete with the land swap in 1967 whilst in Büttenhardt, at the old school house, some old border markers from the 1930s have been used to frame bushes planted around the former enclave.

== Geography ==
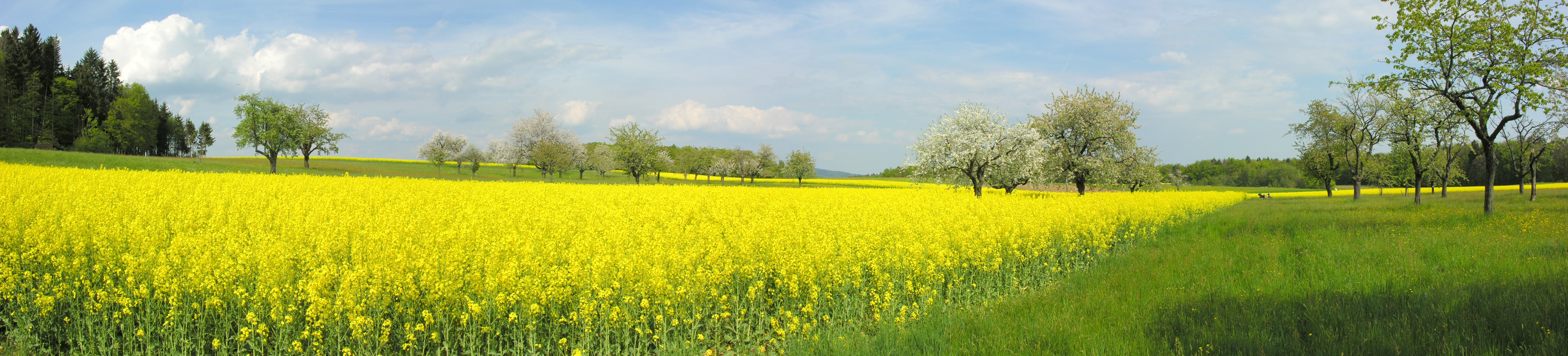
Outer Zelg in Büttenhardt

Büttenhardt has an area, as of 2006, of 4 km^{2} (1.5 sq mi). Of this area, 48.8% is used for agricultural purposes, while 45.3% is forested. The rest of the land, (6%) is settled.

The municipality is located in the Reiat district. It is a farming village located north of Schaffhausen on the rocky Reiatrücken.

== Demographics ==
Büttenhardt has a population (as of December 2020) of 437. In 2008, 8.6% of the population were foreign nationals. Of the foreign population, (as of 2008), 58.1% are from Germany, 3.2% are from Italy, and 38.7% are from another country. Over the last 10 years the population has decreased at a rate of 0%. Most of the population (as of 2000) speaks German (95.9%), with English being second most common ( 1.8%) and Italian being third ( 0.9%).

The age distribution of the population (as of 2008) is children and teenagers (0–19 years old) make up 24.1% of the population, while adults (20–64 years old) make up 63.6% and seniors (over 64 years old) make up 12.3%.

In the 2007 federal election the most popular party was the SVP which received 46.9% of the vote. The next two most popular parties were the SP (30.3%), and the FDP (22.8%) .

The entire Swiss population is generally well educated. In Büttenhardt about 87.7% of the population (between age 25–64) have completed either non-mandatory upper secondary education or additional higher education (either University or a Fachhochschule). In Büttenhardt, as of 2007, 0.29% of the population attend kindergarten or another pre-school, 6.94% attend a Primary School, 4.91% attend a lower level Secondary School, and 4.05% attend a higher level Secondary School.

As of 2000, 15.8% of the population belonged to the Roman Catholic Church and 67.8% belonged to the Swiss Reformed Church.

The historical population is given in the following table:

| year | population |
|---|---|
| 1836 | 148 |
| 1850 | 195 |
| 1880 | 220 |
| 1900 | 166 |
| 1910 | 142 |
| 1950 | 192 |
| 1970 | 161 |
| 1990 | 269 |
| 2000 | 342 |
| 2020 | 423 |

== Employment ==
Büttenhardt has an unemployment rate of 0.66%. As of 2005, there were 28 people employed in the primary economic sector and about 11 businesses involved in this sector. 15 people are employed in the secondary sector and there are 4 businesses in this sector. 17 people are employed in the tertiary sector, with 6 businesses in this sector.

As of 2008 the mid year average unemployment rate was 0.5%. There were 11 non-agrarian businesses in the municipality and 36.2% of the (non-agrarian) population was involved in the secondary sector of the economy while 63.8% were involved in the third. At the same time, 72.3% of the working population was employed full-time, and 27.7% was employed part-time. There were 47 residents of the municipality who were employed in some capacity, of which females made up 42.6% of the workforce. As of 2000 there were 35 residents who worked in the municipality, while 142 residents worked outside Büttenhardt and 19 people commuted into the municipality for work.

As of 2008, there is 1 restaurant, and 1 hotel with 43 beds. The hospitality industry in Büttenhardt employs 1 person.

== Education ==
The Schule Büttenhardt-Lohn, including a preschool campus in Lohn and primary campuses in Büttenhardt (years 1–3) and Lohn (years 4–6), serves Büttenhardt. Büttenhardt children began attending the Lohn preschool in the 2009–2010 school year. The Büttenhardt and Lohn primary schools consolidated in the 2008–2009 school year. The closest realschule/sekundarschule is Schulhaus Gräfler in Schaffhausen.

== See also ==
- Verenahof
