= Christoph Stetter =

German politician (born 1981)

Member of the Landtag of Baden-Württemberg
- Incumbent
- Assumed office 11 May 2026
- Preceded by: Saskia Frank; Hans-Peter Storz; Bernhard Eisenhut
- Constituency: Singen

Personal details
- Born: 1981 (age 44–45)
- Party: Christian Democratic Union (since 1995)

Christoph Stetter (born 1981) is a German politician serving as a member of the Landtag of Baden-Württemberg since 2026. He has been a municipal councillor of Stockach since 2019, and has served as group leader of the Christian Democratic Union in the council since 2019.
