= Altdorf, Schaffhausen =

Altdorf
- Former municipality
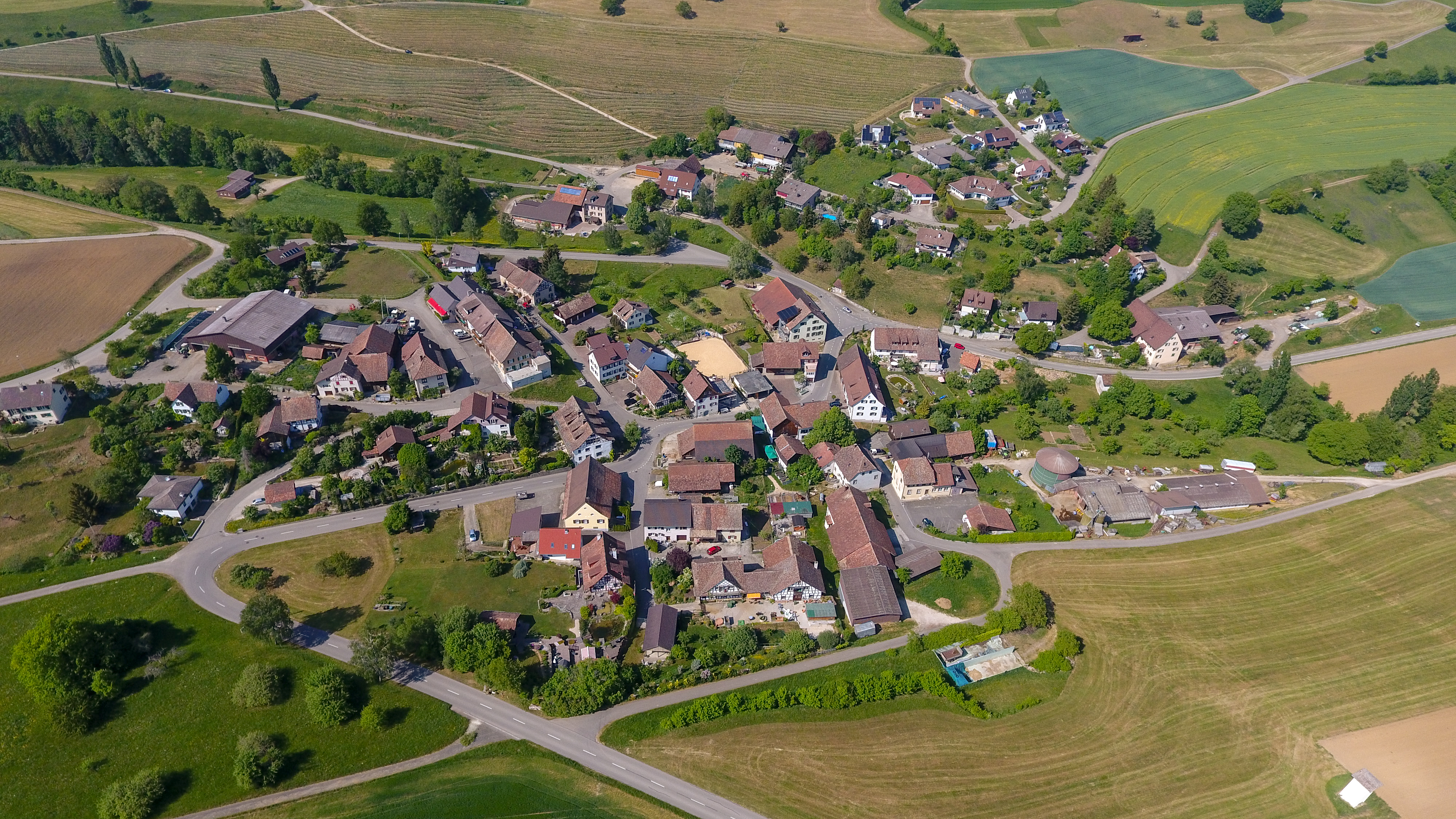

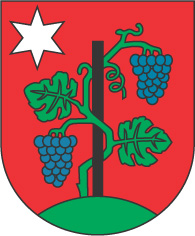
- Coat of arms
- Location of Altdorf
- Location within Switzerland Location within Canton of Schaffhausen
- Coordinates: 47°47′N 8°39′E
- Country: Switzerland
- Canton: Schaffhausen
- District: n.a.

Area
  - Total: 3.04 km^{2} (1.17 sq mi)
- Elevation: 516 m (1,693 ft)

Population (December 2007)
  - Total: 208
  - Density: 68.4/km^{2} (177/sq mi)
- Time zone: UTC+01:00 (CET)
  - Summer (DST): UTC+02:00 (CEST)
- Postal code: 8243
- SFOS number: 2911
- ISO 3166 code: CH-SH
- Surrounded by: Hofen, Opfertshofen, Tengen (DE-BW)
- Website: Profile (in German), SFSO statistics

Altdorf (German pronunciation: [ˈaltˌdɔʁf]) was a municipality in the canton of Schaffhausen in northern Switzerland. On 1 January 2009 Altdorf merged with Bibern, Hofen, Opfertshofen and Thayngen to form the municipality of Thayngen.

Aerial view (1964)
