= Bibern, Schaffhausen =

Bibern
- Former municipality
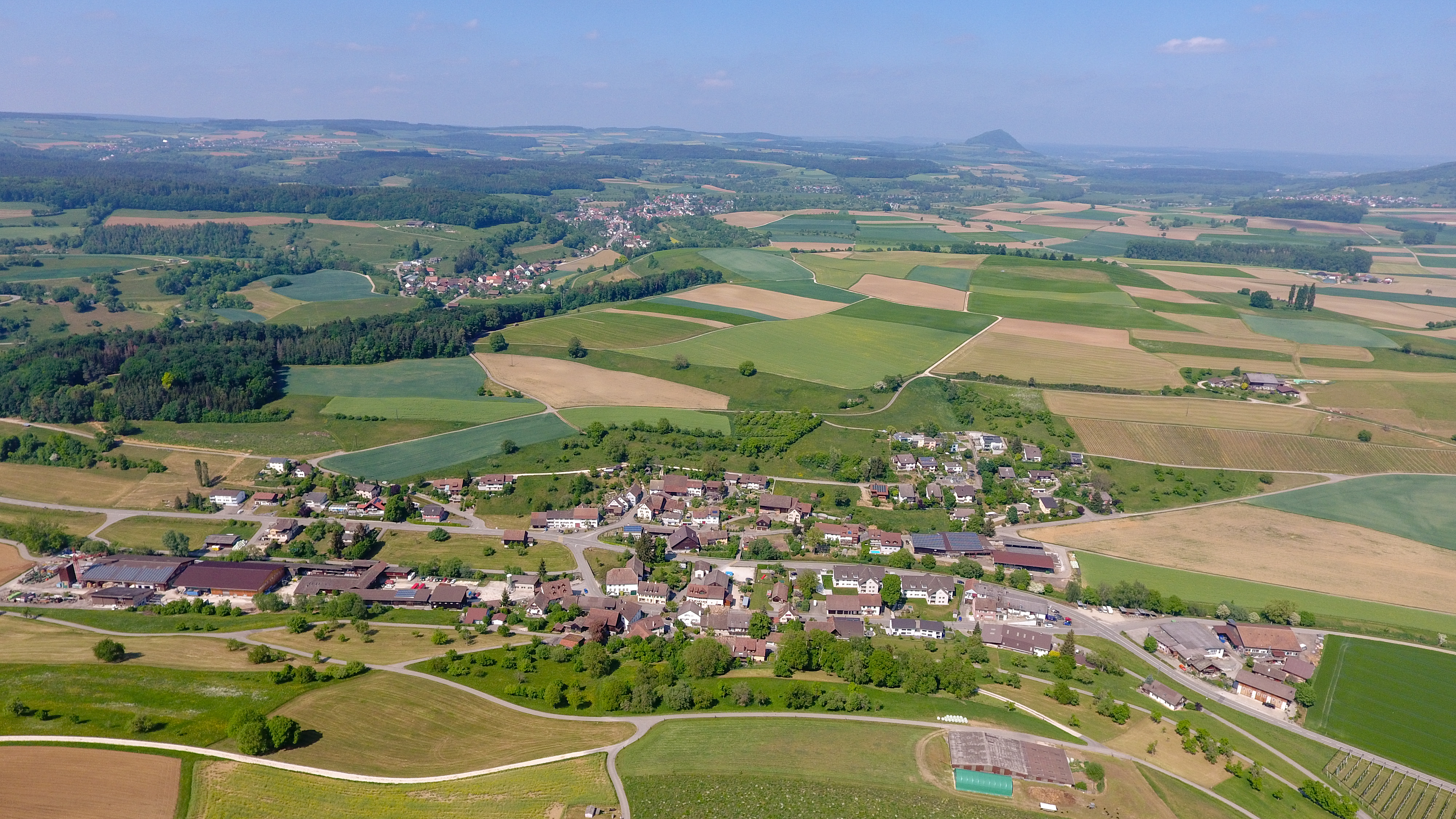

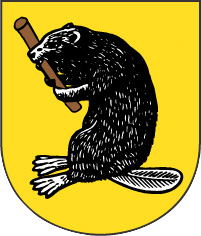
- Coat of arms
- Location of Bibern
- Location within Switzerland Location within Canton of Schaffhausen
- Coordinates: 47°46′N 8°40′E
- Country: Switzerland
- Canton: Schaffhausen
- District: n.a.

Area
  - Total: 1.80 km^{2} (0.69 sq mi)
- Elevation: 462 m (1,516 ft)

Population (June 2008)
  - Total: 248
  - Density: 138/km^{2} (357/sq mi)
- Time zone: UTC+01:00 (CET)
  - Summer (DST): UTC+02:00 (CEST)
- Postal code: 8233
- SFOS number: 2913
- ISO 3166 code: CH-SH
- Surrounded by: Hilzingen (DE-BW), Hofen, Lohn, Opfertshofen, Tengen (DE-BW), Thayngen
- Website: Profile (in German), SFSO statistics

Bibern was a municipality in the canton of Schaffhausen in Switzerland. On 1 January 2009 Bibern merged with Altdorf, Hofen, Opfertshofen and Thayngen to form the municipality of Thayngen.

Aerial view (1964)
