= Hofen, Switzerland =

Hofen
- Former municipality
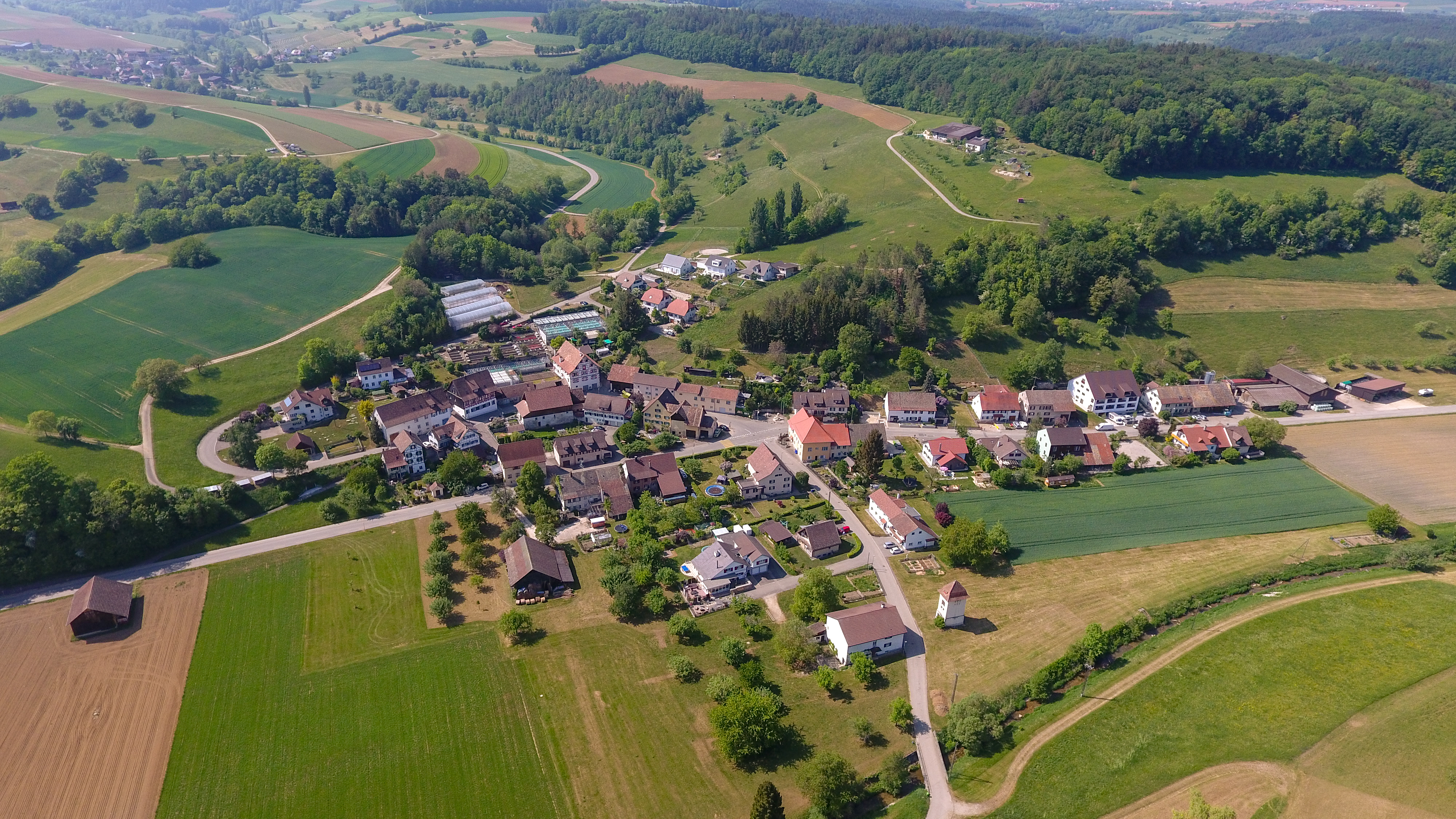

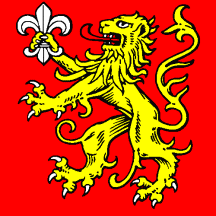
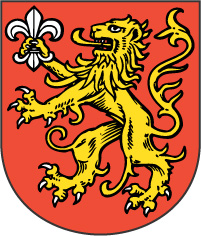
- Flag Coat of arms
- Location of Hofen
- Location within Switzerland Location within Canton of Schaffhausen
- Coordinates: 47°46′N 8°40′E
- Country: Switzerland
- Canton: Schaffhausen
- District: n.a.

Area
  - Total: 1.05 km^{2} (0.41 sq mi)
- Elevation: 474 m (1,555 ft)

Population (June 2008)
  - Total: 136
  - Density: 130/km^{2} (335/sq mi)
- Time zone: UTC+01:00 (CET)
  - Summer (DST): UTC+02:00 (CEST)
- Postal code: 8242
- SFOS number: 2916
- ISO 3166 code: CH-SH
- Surrounded by: Altdorf, Bibern, Opfertshofen, Tengen (DE-BW)
- Website: Profile (in German), SFSO statistics

Hofen was a municipality in the canton of Schaffhausen in Switzerland. On 1 January 2009 Hofen merged with Altdorf, Bibern, Opfertshofen and Thayngen to form the municipality of Thayngen.

== History ==
Aerial view (1964)

Hofen is first mentioned in 1258 as Hofen.

== Coat of arms ==
The blazon of the municipal coat of arms is Gules a Lion rampant Or langued of the first and armed Argent holding in dexter a Fleur-de-lis of the last.

The coat of arms comes from the mayor of Schaffhausen and resident of Hofen, Tobias Holländer (24 February 1636 - 1711). His family came from Holland (the origin of the last name) though he was born in Basel. He became mayor in 1683 and on 18 January 1684 bought land in Hofen and built his manor house, the Holländer's house. Holländer was ambitious and a follower of King Louis XIV of France and he created a personal army in the model of Louis' army. His coat of arms represented his origin and ambition. The lion represents the lion of the Dutch Republic while the fleur-de-lis represents Louis XIV. When he built barracks for his private army in Hofen, he decorated them with his personal coat of arms, which is still visible. His coat of arms became the village coat of arms.

== Geography ==
Hofen has an area, as of 2006, of 1 km^{2} (0.39 sq mi). Of this area, 73.1% is used for agricultural purposes, while 8.7% is forested. Of the rest of the land, 16.3% is settled (buildings or roads) and the remainder (1.9%) is non-productive (rivers or lakes). The village is located in the Reiat district in the Biber valley. It is on the border with Baden-Württemberg in Germany, and halfway between Opfertshofen, Switzerland and Büsslingen, Germany, on the Swiss Hauptstrasse from Thayngen to Büsslingen.

== Demographics ==
In the 2007 federal election the most popular party was the SVP which received 52.2% of the vote. The next two most popular parties were the SP (25.4%), and the FDP (22.5%).

The historical population is given in the following table:

year	population
1850	123
1900	126
1950	140
1980	108
2000	127
