= Eberhard Im Thurn =

Austrian feudal lord (b. 1658, d. 1728)

Eberhard Im Thurn zu Büsingen (* 7 November 1658 in Schaffhausen; † 1728 in Büsingen) was the Austrian feudal lord and vogt in Büsingen am Hochrhein from 1658.

== Early life ==
He was born into the Im Thurn noble family. Although he was born in Schaffhausen, Switzerland, he was an Austrian feudal lord. His family lived in Thayngen, part of the Reiat. In 1723 he went to the High Court for a purchase at Schaffhausen. His wife was either Anna Effinger (DE) of Castle Wildegg or Agatha Catarina of Waldkirch .

== Abduction and incarceration ==
After a dispute with his family and with the pastor of Büsingen, Eberhard was accused of secretly being a Catholic. On April 10, 1693, he was abducted by his own family and brought in a carriage to Schaffhausen, where he was initially kept hidden in a private house. Later he was handed over to the Schaffhausen government. After the trial, he was initially sentenced to life in prison after a close vote. He came back to Büsingen after a diplomatic dispute in 1699.

After his release, six years later, the physically and psychologically battered Im Thum was reinstated in his previous posts. He then converted to the Roman Catholic faith. The case of his kidnapping is a defining event in the history of Büsingen, which remains a German exclave, completely surrounded by Switzerland. Today Büsingen is the only self-governing German exclave. His former home in Büsingen, the so-called Büsinger Junkerhaus, is a beautiful half-timbered building.

== Bibliography ==
- Johannes Winzeler, Geschichte von Thayngen, 1963
