= FC Büsingen =

- Full name: Fussballclub Büsingen
- Nickname(s): Büsi-Boys
- Founded: 1924
- Ground: Kirchberg
- Chairman: Daniel Spitz
- Manager: Wolfgang Arbenz
- League: 4th Liga, Gruppe 5 (VI)
- 2024–25: 5th
Home colours	Away colours

Location of Büsingen, surrounded by Switzerland

FC Büsingen is a German association football club based in the exclave of Büsingen that competes in the Swiss league system, being the only German club to do so. The club was founded in 1924 and has currently, as of 2008, about 215 members.

== History ==
The club was formed in 1924 and dissolved in 1937, when the Nazis forced the members to join the local gymnastics club, the TV Büsingen. Until 1927, the club's football field included a nut tree in the penalty area but due to this not being compliant with the rules of the game, it had to be cut down on 30 April 1927.

The FCB was reformed on 26 April 1947 and this time joined the Swiss Football Association instead. It carries the (German: Vereinsnummer) club number 11902 in Switzerland.

The club's greatest success came in 1973, when it earned promotion to the Swiss 2nd Liga, the fourth tier of the league system. The FCB could not hold this league for long, finishing last in its one and only season, and has since returned to the lower levels of Swiss league football, fluctuating between 3rd and 5th Liga, the latter being the lowest tier of the league system.

The FCB plays in the Zürich region of the Swiss league system.

The club's song, the Fussballerlied FC Büsingen, describes the geographical situation of the club quite well, with its close proximity to the river Rhine. It proclaims, that the club will never "go under", even when its playing field is flooded, in reference to the yearly spring floods the river carries down from the Swiss Alps.

== Recent seasons ==
Season	Division	Tier	Position
1999–2000	4th Liga, Gruppe 12	VI	8th
2000–01	4th Liga, Gruppe 12	VI	9th
2001–02	4th Liga, Gruppe 12	VI	11th ↓
2002–03	did not compete		
2003–04	5th Liga – Gruppe 1	VII	5th
2004–05	5th Liga – Gruppe 1	VII	1st ↑
2005–06	4th Liga, Gruppe 12	VI	10th
2006–07	4th Liga, Gruppe 12	VI	5th
2007–08	4th Liga, Gruppe 12	VI	7th
2008–09	4th Liga, Gruppe 12	VI	5th
2009–10	4th Liga, Gruppe 12	VI	5th
2010–11	4th Liga, Gruppe 12	VI	4th
2011–12	4th Liga, Gruppe 12	VI	

Source:"League tables of the Swiss amateur leagues". Fussballverband Region Zürich. Archived from the original on 18 December 2008.

== Honours ==
- 5. Liga – Gruppe 1
  - Champions: 2005
- 4. Liga – Gruppe 12
  - Champions: 2016
