= Steißlingen =

- Municipality
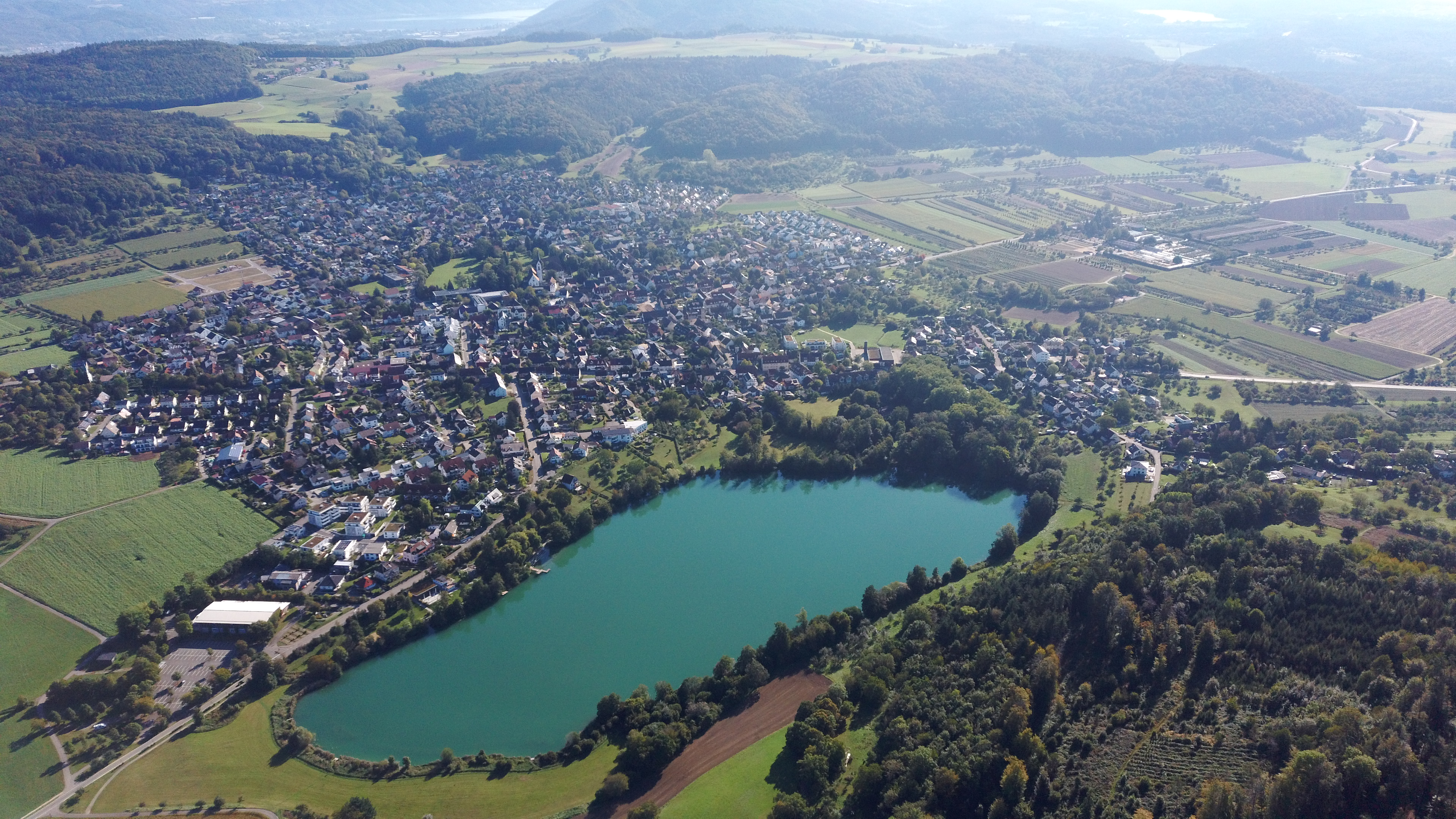
- Steißlingen on the shore of the Steißlinger See

- Coat of arms

- Location of Steißlingen within Konstanz district
- Interactive map of Steißlingen
- Location within Germany Location within Baden-Württemberg
- Coordinates: 47°48′01″N 08°55′27″E
- Country: Germany
- State: Baden-Württemberg
- Admin. region: Freiburg
- District: Konstanz

Government
  - Mayor (2017–25): Benjamin Mors

Area
  - Total: 24.52 km^{2} (9.47 sq mi)
- Elevation: 465 m (1,526 ft)

Population (2025-12-31)
  - Total: 5,081
  - Density: 207.2/km^{2} (536.7/sq mi)
- Time zone: UTC+01:00 (CET)
  - Summer (DST): UTC+02:00 (CEST)
- Postal codes: 78256
- Dialling codes: 07738
- Vehicle registration: KN
- Website: www.steisslingen.de

Steißlingen (German pronunciation: [ˈʃtaɪslɪŋən]) is a municipality in the district of Konstanz in Baden-Württemberg in Germany.
