= Opfertshofen =

- Former municipality
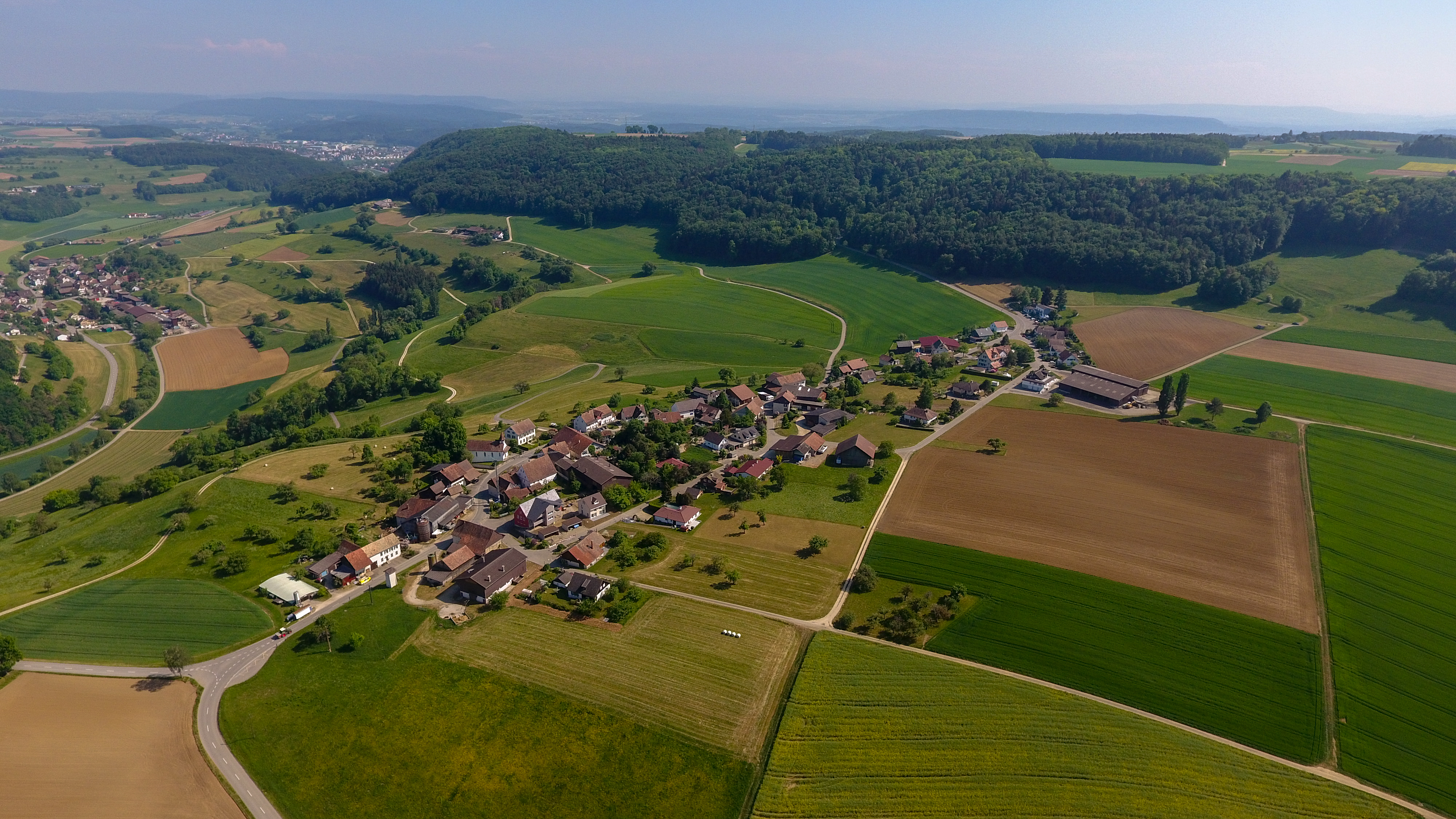

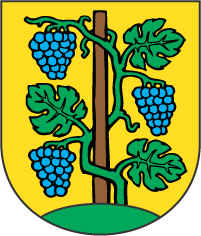
- Coat of arms
- Location of Opfertshofen
- Location within Switzerland Location within Canton of Schaffhausen
- Coordinates: 47°46′N 8°39′E
- Country: Switzerland
- Canton: Schaffhausen
- District: n.a.

Area
  - Total: 2.11 km^{2} (0.81 sq mi)
- Elevation: 566 m (1,857 ft)

Population (December 2005)
  - Total: 132
  - Density: 62.6/km^{2} (162/sq mi)
- Time zone: UTC+01:00 (CET)
  - Summer (DST): UTC+02:00 (CEST)
- Postal code: 8236
- SFOS number: 2918
- ISO 3166 code: CH-SH
- Surrounded by: Altdorf, Bibern, Büttenhardt, Hofen, Lohn, Tengen (DE-BW)
- Website: Profile (in German), SFSO statistics

Opfertshofen was a municipality in the canton of Schaffhausen in the north of Switzerland. On 1 January 2009 Opfershofen merged with Altdorf, Bibern, Hofen, and Thayngen to form the municipality of Thayngen.

Aerial view (1964)
