= Herblingen Castle =

Castle in Stetten, Switzerland

- Schloss Herblingen
- Stetten
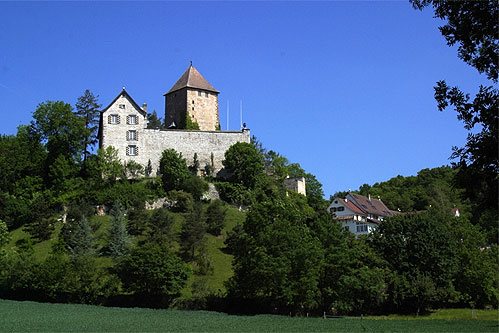
- Herblingen Castle

Site information
- Type: spur castle
- Code: CH-SH
- Condition: privately owned

Location
- Coordinates: 47°44′01″N 8°39′40″E
- Height: 520 m above the sea

Site history
- Built: 13th century

Garrison information
- Occupants: Freiherren

Herblingen Castle is a castle in the municipality of Stetten of the Canton of Schaffhausen in Switzerland. It is a Swiss heritage site of national significance.

== See also ==
- List of castles in Switzerland
