= Saskia Frank =

German politician (born 1987)

Member of the Landtag of Baden-Württemberg
- Incumbent
- Assumed office 1 September 2024
- Preceded by: Dorothea Wehinger
- Constituency: Singen (2024–2026)

Personal details
- Born: 20 April 1987 (age 39)
- Party: Alliance 90/The Greens (since 2018)

Saskia Frank (born 20 April 1987) is a German politician serving as a member of the Landtag of Baden-Württemberg since 2024. She has served as co-group leader of Alliance 90/The Greens in the district council of Konstanz since 2019.
