= Thayngen =

- Municipality
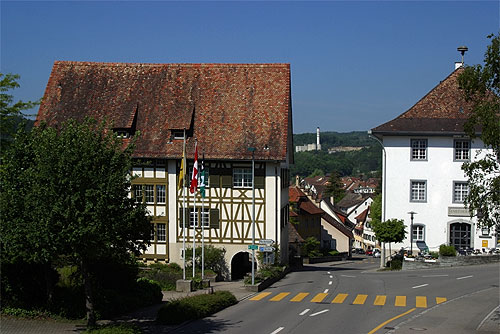

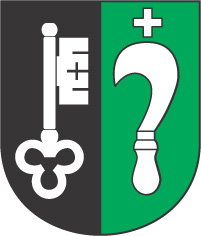
- Flag Coat of arms
- Location of Thayngen
- Location within Switzerland Location within Canton of Schaffhausen
- Coordinates: 47°44′N 8°42′E
- Country: Switzerland
- Canton: Schaffhausen
- District: n.a.

Area
  - Total: 11.92 km^{2} (4.60 sq mi)
- Elevation: 437 m (1,434 ft)

Population (December 2008)
  - Total: 4,935
  - Density: 414.0/km^{2} (1,072/sq mi)
- Time zone: UTC+01:00 (CET)
  - Summer (DST): UTC+02:00 (CEST)
- Postal code: 8240
- SFOS number: 2920
- ISO 3166 code: CH-SH
- Surrounded by: Bibern, Dörflingen, Gottmadingen (DE-BW), Hilzingen (DE-BW), Lohn, Schaffhausen, Stetten
- Website: www.thayngen.ch

Thayngen (German pronunciation: [ˈtaːɪŋən]) is a village and a municipality in the canton of Schaffhausen in Switzerland. The neighboring village Barzheim merged with Thayngen on 1 January 2004. On 1 January 2009 Altdorf, Bibern, Hofen and Opfertshofen merged into Thayngen.

== Geography ==
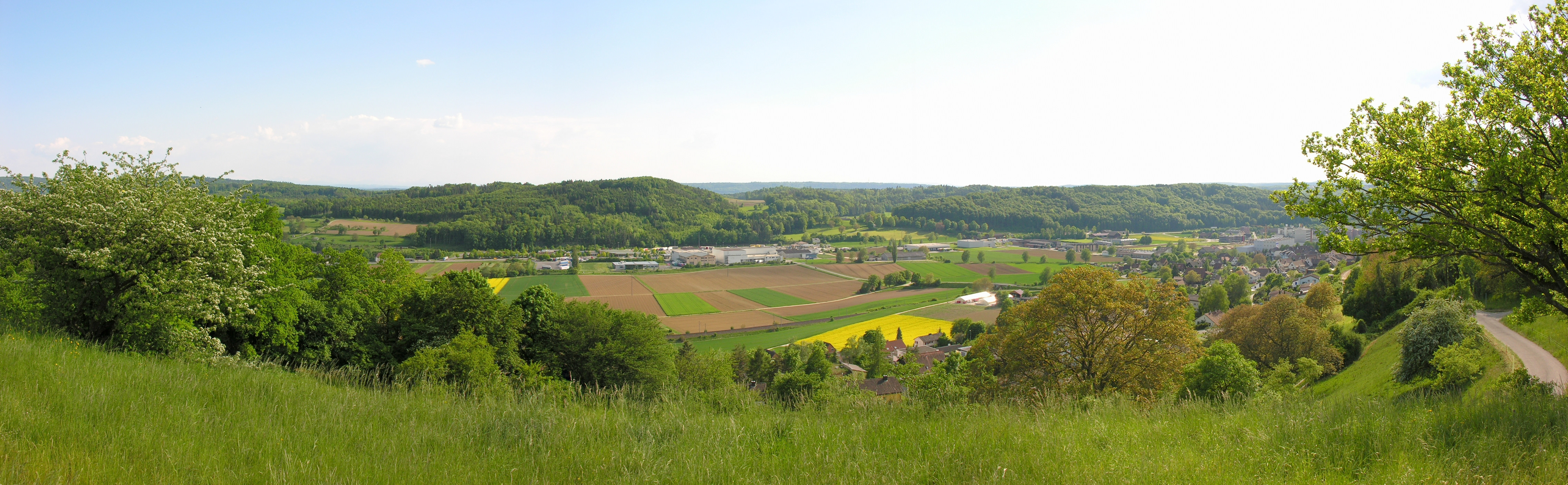
Chapf and Thayngen

Aerial view (1958)

Thayngen has an area, as of 2006, of 11.9 km^{2} (4.6 sq mi). Of this area, 52.2% is used for agricultural purposes, while 28.9% is forested. Of the rest of the land, 17.1% is settled (buildings or roads) and the remainder (1.8%) is non-productive (rivers or lakes).

Two kettle ponds are located in Thayngen: Morgetshofsee and Rudolfersee.

== Coat of arms ==
The blazon of the municipal coat of arms is Per pale Sable a key Argent and Vert a Sickle of the second and in chief a Cross couped.

== Demographics ==
Thayngen has a population (as of 2008) of 4,935, of which 17.8% are foreign nationals. Of the foreign population, (as of 2008), 47.4% are from Germany, 15.2% are from Italy, 5.5% are from Croatia, 10.2% are from Serbia, 4.1% are from Macedonia, 4.7% are from Turkey, and 12.9% are from another country. Over the last 10 years the population has grown at a rate of 6.2%. Most of the population (as of 2000) speaks German (90.2%), with Italian being second most common ( 3.1%) and Serbo-Croatian being third ( 2.0%).

The age distribution of the population (as of 2008) is children and teenagers (0–19 years old) make up 20% of the population, while adults (20–64 years old) make up 61.1% and seniors (over 64 years old) make up 18.9%.

In the 2007 federal election the most popular party was the SVP which received 39.4% of the vote. The next two most popular parties were the SP (33.4%), and the FDP (27.2%).

In Thayngen about 72.9% of the population (between age 25-64) have completed either non-mandatory upper secondary education or additional higher education (either university or a Fachhochschule). In Thayngen, as of 2007, 1.62% of the population attend kindergarten or another pre-school, 6.12% attend a Primary School, 3.51% attend a lower level Secondary School, and 1.68% attend a higher level Secondary School.

As of 2000, 22.6% of the population belonged to the Roman Catholic Church and 57.1% belonged to the Swiss Reformed Church.

The historical population is given in the following table:

Year	Population
1990	4,726
2000	4,813

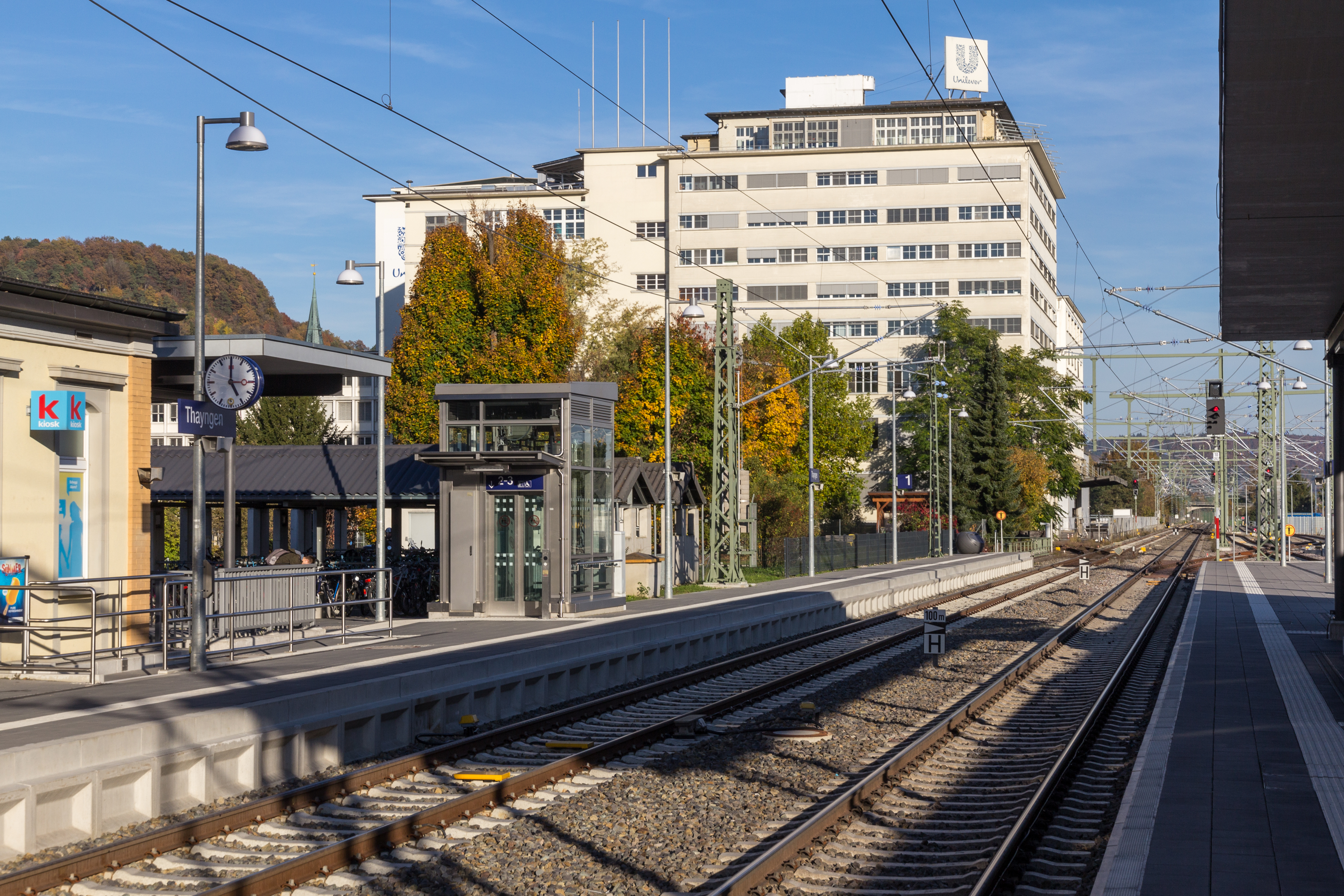
Unilever buildings at Thayngen station

== Economy ==
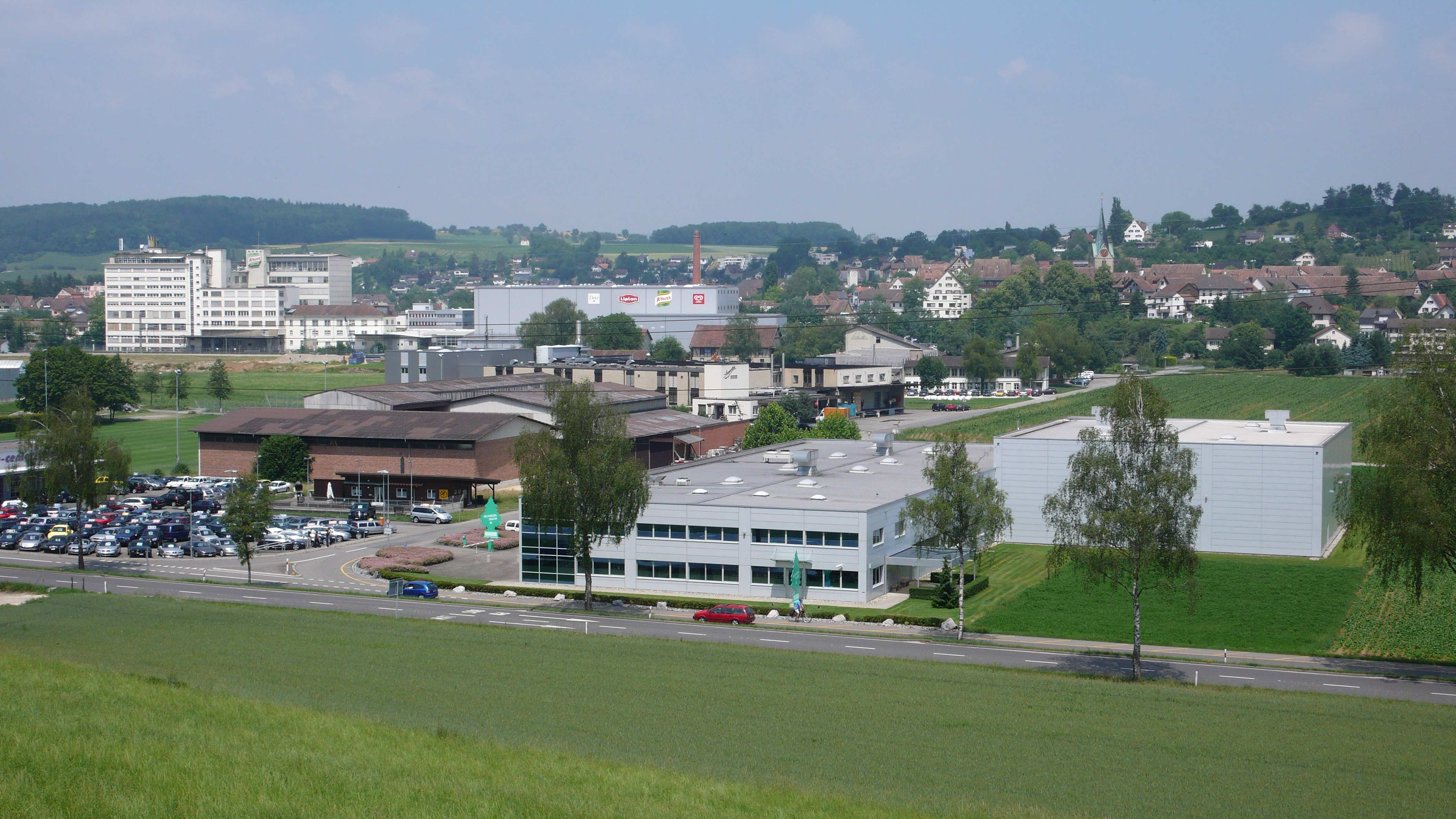
Thayngen

Thayngen has an unemployment rate of 1.75%. As of 2005, there were 212 people employed in the primary economic sector and about 50 businesses involved in this sector. 1,342 people are employed in the secondary sector and there are 54 businesses in this sector. 912 people are employed in the tertiary sector, with 132 businesses in this sector.

As of 2008 the mid year average unemployment rate was 1.6%. There were 216 non-agrarian businesses in the municipality and 54.1% of the (non-agrarian) population was involved in the secondary sector of the economy while 45.9% were involved in the third. At the same time, 82.4% of the working population was employed full-time, and 17.6% was employed part-time. There were 2488 residents of the municipality who were employed in some capacity, of which females made up 39.8% of the workforce. As of 2000 there were 994 residents who worked in the municipality, while 1291 residents worked outside Thayngen and 946 people commuted into the municipality for work.

As of 2008, there are 9 restaurants, and 3 hotels with 31 beds. The hospitality industry in Thayngen employs 46 people.

== Heritage sites of national significance ==
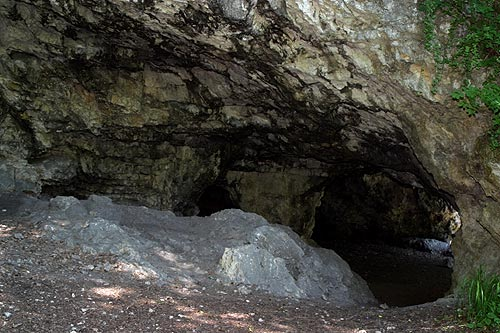
Prehistoric cave dwelling at Kesslerloch

There are two houses and two prehistoric sites in Thayngen that are listed as Swiss heritage sites of national significance. In the town, the Haus zum Hirzen at Schulstrasse 3, and the Haus zum Rebstock at Im Oberhof 4 are the two significant houses. The prehistoric sites are the Kesslerloch which was a Paleolithic cave and the Weier, a Neolithic river bank settlement. The settlements Weier I-III are part of the Prehistoric Pile dwellings around the Alps a UNESCO World Heritage Site.

== Transportation ==
Thayngen railway station is served by Zurich S-Bahn services S24, which links Thayngen and Zurich, and S22, which links Bülach and Singen. It is also served by Deutsche Bahn regional services from Schaffhausen to Singen. The border with Germany is often busy, as it is the preferred route for trucks heading from Germany into Switzerland.
