= Merishausen =

- Municipality
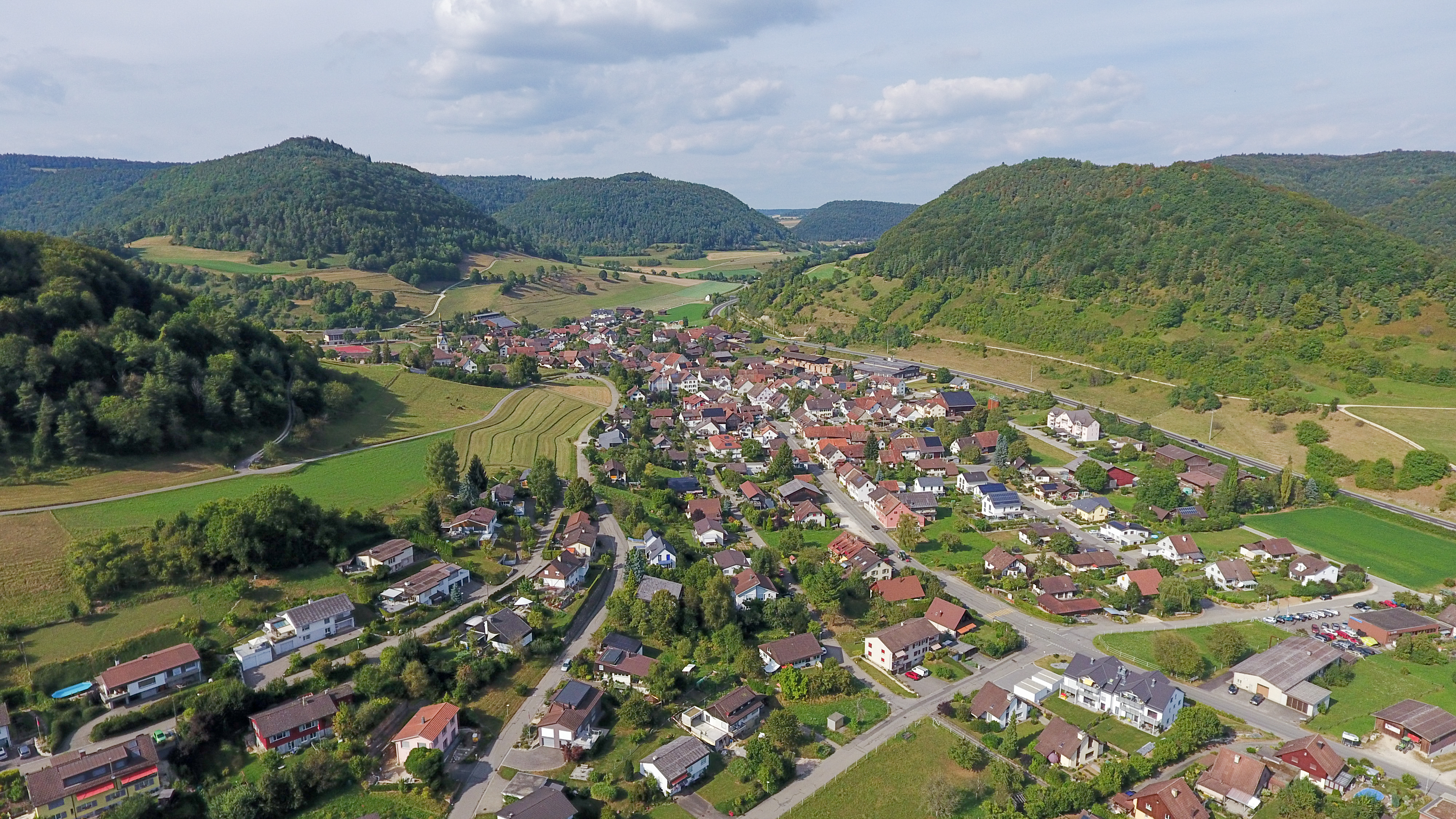

- Flag Coat of arms
- Location of Merishausen
- Location within Switzerland Location within Canton of Schaffhausen
- Coordinates: 47°45′N 8°36′E
- Country: Switzerland
- Canton: Schaffhausen
- District: n.a.

Area
  - Total: 17.57 km^{2} (6.78 sq mi)
- Elevation: 533 m (1,749 ft)

Population (December 2008)
  - Total: 779
  - Density: 44.3/km^{2} (115/sq mi)
- Time zone: UTC+01:00 (CET)
  - Summer (DST): UTC+02:00 (CEST)
- Postal code: 8232
- SFOS number: 2936
- ISO 3166 code: CH-SH
- Surrounded by: Bargen, Beggingen, Blumberg (DE-BW), Büttenhardt, Hemmental, Schaffhausen, Tengen (DE-BW)
- Website: www.merishausen.ch

Merishausen is a municipality in the canton of Schaffhausen in Switzerland.

== History ==
Aerial view (1964)

Merishausen is first mentioned in 846 as Morinishusun.

== Coat of arms ==
The blazon of the municipal coat of arms is Azure a Mullet Or.

== Geography ==
Merishausen has an area, as of 2006, of 17.5 km^{2} (6.8 sq mi). Of this area, 30.3% is used for agricultural purposes, while 65.6% is forested. Of the rest of the land, 3.9% is settled (buildings or roads) and the remainder (0.2%) is non-productive (rivers or lakes).

The municipality is located in the Schaffhausen district on the German border. It is located on the Durach river along an important trade route between southern Germany and Switzerland.

== Demographics ==
Merishausen has a population (as of 2008) of 779, of which 10.0% are foreign nationals. Of the foreign population, (as of 2008), 50% are from Germany, 10.9% are from Italy, and 39.1% are from another country. Over the last 10 years the population has grown at a rate of 7.4%. Most of the population (as of 2000) speaks German (97.0%), with English being second most common ( 1.1%) and Italian being third ( 0.6%). The age distribution of the population (as of 2008) is children and teenagers (0–19 years old) make up 23.1% of the population, while adults (20–64 years old) make up 61.2% and seniors (over 64 years old) make up 15.7%.

In the 2007 federal election the most popular party was the SVP which received 56% of the vote. The next two most popular parties were the SP (22.8%), and the FDP (21.2%) .

In Merishausen about 78.2% of the population (between age 25–64) have completed either non-mandatory upper secondary education or additional higher education (either university or a Fachhochschule). In Merishausen, as of 2007, 2.34% of the population attend kindergarten or another pre-school, 7.72% attend a Primary School, 2.48% attend a lower level Secondary School, and 2.76% attend a higher level Secondary School.

As of 2000, 14.1% of the population belonged to the Roman Catholic Church and 74.2% belonged to the Swiss Reformed Church.

The historical population is given in the following table:

year	population
1771	467
1798	674
1850	932
1900	632
1950	539
2000	644

== Economy ==
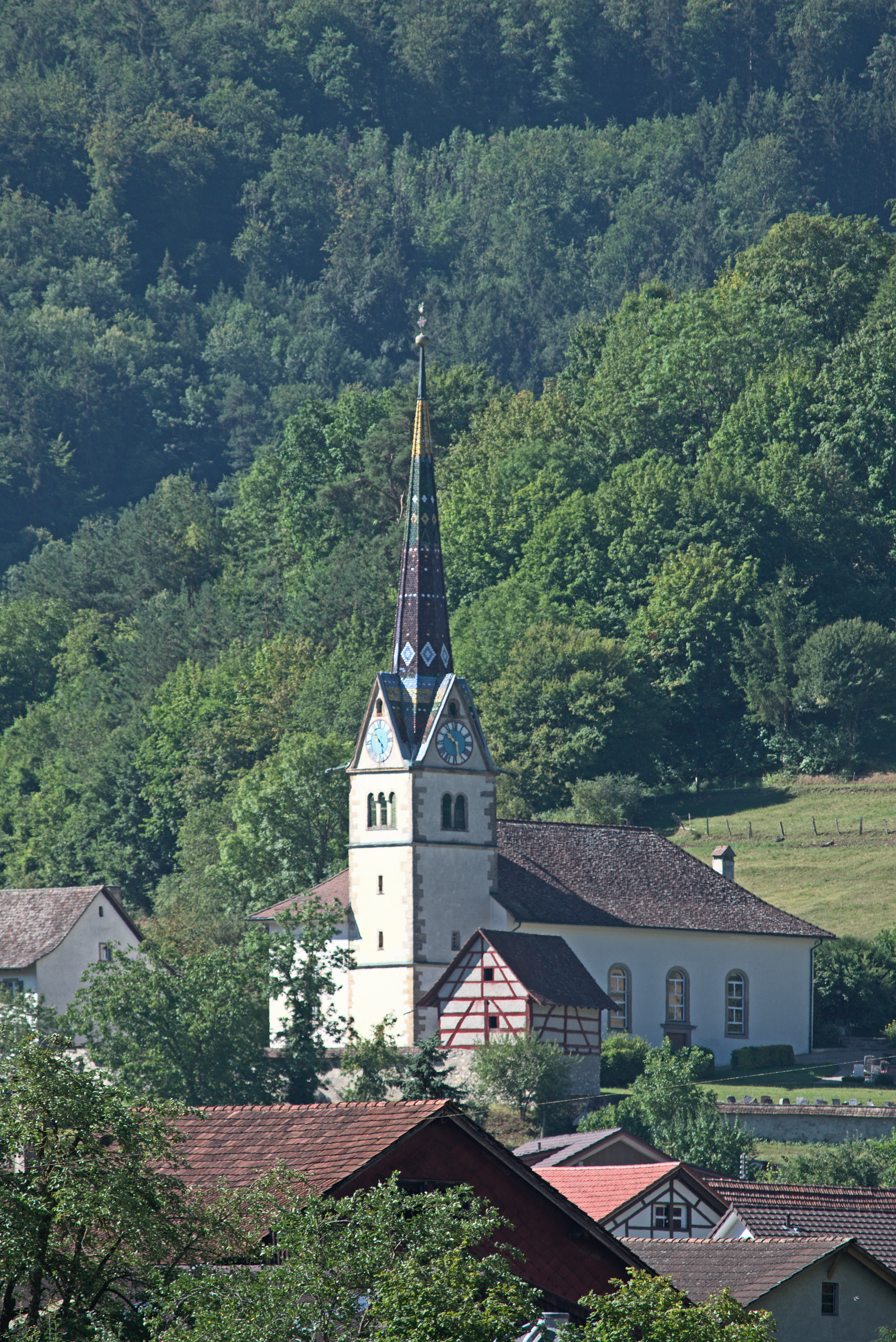
Merishausen parish church

Merishausen has an unemployment rate of 0.38%. As of 2005, there were 58 people employed in the primary economic sector and about 20 businesses involved in this sector. 29 people are employed in the secondary sector and there are 7 businesses in this sector. 54 people are employed in the tertiary sector, with 19 businesses in this sector.

As of 2008 the mid year average unemployment rate was 0.5%. There were 35 non-agrarian businesses in the municipality and 16.2% of the (non-agrarian) population was involved in the secondary sector of the economy while 83.8% were involved in the third. At the same time, 49.6% of the working population was employed full-time, and 50.4% was employed part-time. There were 117 residents of the municipality who were employed in some capacity, of which females made up 49.6% of the workforce. As of 2000 there were 67 residents who worked in the municipality, while 246 residents worked outside Merishausen and 34 people commuted into the municipality for work.

As of 2008, there are 3 restaurants in the village and the hospitality industry in Merishausen employs 9 people.

== Heritage sites of national significance ==
The Pfarrscheune or parish tithe barn on the Kirchgasse is listed as a Swiss heritage site of national significance. The village church was built in 1838 on the site of the earlier, first mentioned in 846, St. Martins Church. The nearby tithing barn was built in 1560, and today is a farm house.

== Weather ==
Merishausen has an average of 130.1 days of rain or snow per year and on average receives 996 mm (39.2 in) of precipitation. The wettest month is June during which time Merishausen receives an average of 108 mm (4.3 in) of rain or snow. During this month there is precipitation for an average of 11.7 days. The month with the most days of precipitation is May, with an average of 12.6, but with only 93 mm (3.7 in) of rain or snow. The driest month of the year is September with an average of 64 mm (2.5 in) of precipitation over 11.7 days.
