= Lohn, Schaffhausen =

Lohn
- Municipality
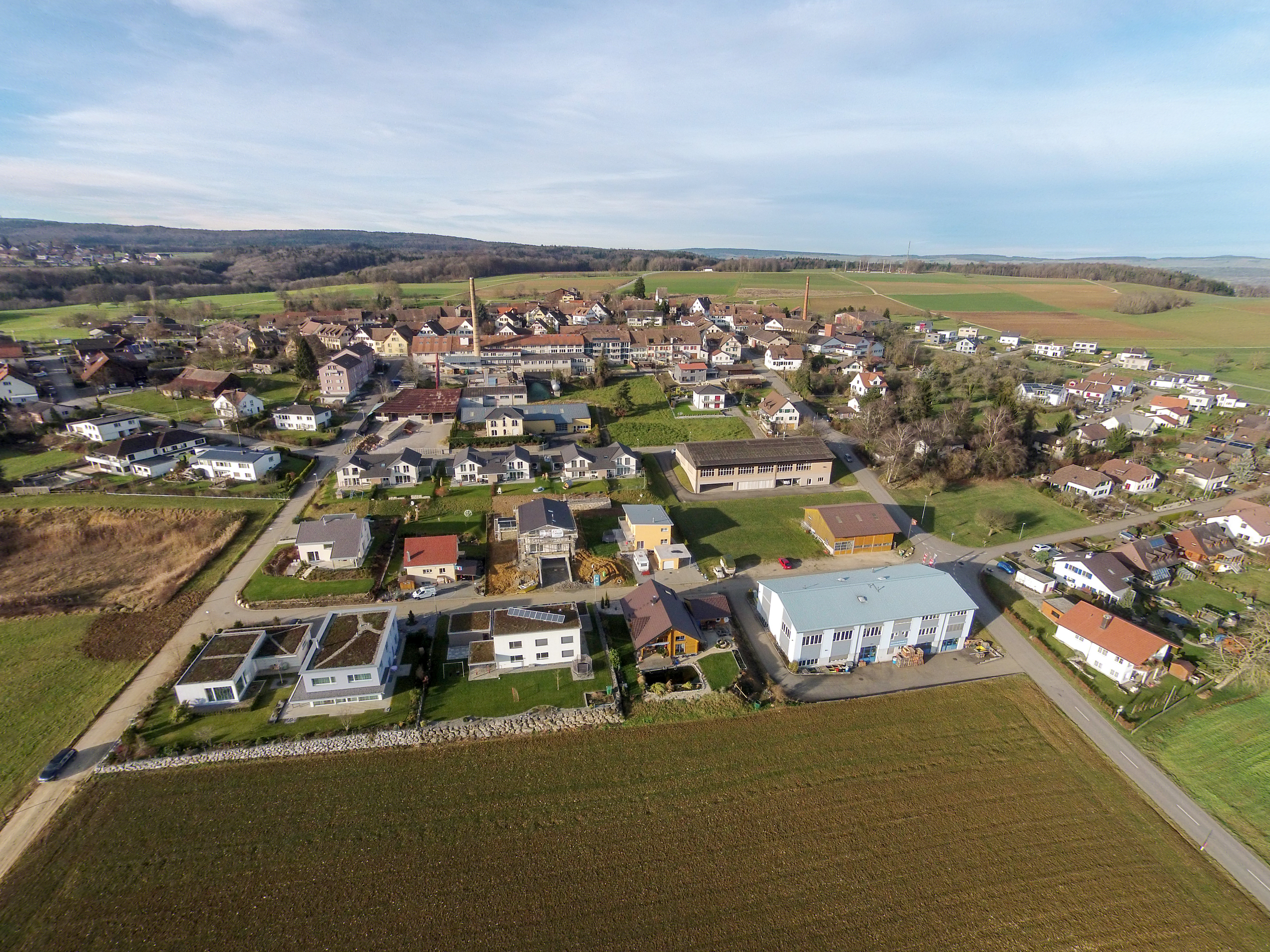

- Flag Coat of arms
- Location of Lohn
- Location within Switzerland Location within Canton of Schaffhausen
- Coordinates: 47°45′N 8°40′E
- Country: Switzerland
- Canton: Schaffhausen
- District: n.a.

Area
  - Total: 4.87 km^{2} (1.88 sq mi)
- Elevation: 636 m (2,087 ft)

Population (December 2008)
  - Total: 643
  - Density: 132/km^{2} (342/sq mi)
- Time zone: UTC+01:00 (CET)
  - Summer (DST): UTC+02:00 (CEST)
- Postal code: 8235
- SFOS number: 2917
- ISO 3166 code: CH-SH
- Surrounded by: Bibern, Büttenhardt, Opfertshofen, Stetten, Thayngen
- Twin towns: Lohn-Ammannsegg, Solothurn (Switzerland)
- Website: www.lohn.ch

Lohn is a municipality in the canton of Schaffhausen in Switzerland.

== History ==
Lohn is first mentioned in 1238 as Lône.

== Coat of arms ==
The blazon of the municipal coat of arms is Gules a Ploughshare Argent.

== Geography ==
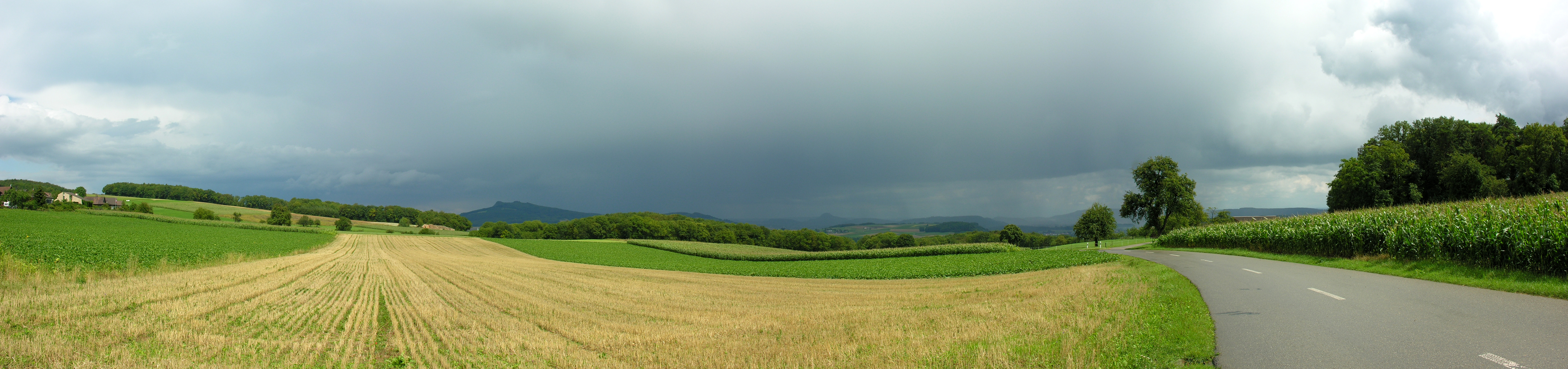
Fields near Lohn, SH

Aerial view (1948)

Lohn has an area, as of 2006, of 4.9 km^{2} (1.9 sq mi). Of this area, 56.6% is used for agricultural purposes, while 35.7% is forested. Of the rest of the land, 7.4% is settled (buildings or roads) and the remainder (0.4%) is non-productive (rivers or lakes).

The municipality is located in the Reiat district. It consists of the haufendorf village (an irregular, unplanned and quite closely packed village, built around a central square) of Lohn on a plateau of the Reiat hills.

== Demographics ==
Lohn has a population (as of 2016) of 765, of which 4.8% are foreign nationals. Of the foreign population, (as of 2008), 71.9% are from Germany, 9.4% are from Italy, 3.1% are from Croatia, and 15.6% are from another country. Over the last 10 years the population has grown at a rate of 5.7%. Most of the population (as of 2000) speaks German (97.0%), with French being second most common ( 0.6%) and Spanish being third ( 0.5%).

The age distribution of the population (as of 2008) is children and teenagers (0–19 years old) make up 24.1% of the population, while adults (20–64 years old) make up 61.1% and seniors (over 64 years old) make up 14.8%.

In the 2007 federal election the most popular party was the SVP which received 51.6% of the vote. The next two most popular parties were the FDP (24.3%), and the SP (24.1%) .

The entire Swiss population is generally well educated. In Lohn about 85.7% of the population (between age 25-64) have completed either non-mandatory upper secondary education or additional higher education (either university or a Fachhochschule). In Lohn, as of 2007, 1.55% of the population attend kindergarten or another pre-school, 8.23% attend a Primary School, 5.12% attend a lower level Secondary School, and 3.73% attend a higher level Secondary School.

As of 2000, 14.8% of the population belonged to the Roman Catholic Church and 72.9% belonged to the Swiss Reformed Church.

The historical population is given in the following table:

year	population
1798	248
1836	308
1850	340
1900	352
1950	403
2000	634

== Economy ==
Lohn has an unemployment rate of 0.49%. As of 2005, there were 21 people employed in the primary economic sector and about 7 businesses involved in this sector. 45 people are employed in the secondary sector and there are 10 businesses in this sector. 36 people are employed in the tertiary sector, with 17 businesses in this sector.

As of 2008 the mid year average unemployment rate was 0.5%. There were 27 non-agrarian businesses in the municipality and 60.5% of the (non-agrarian) population was involved in the secondary sector of the economy while 39.5% were involved in the third. At the same time, 72.8% of the working population was employed full-time, and 27.2% was employed part-time. There were 81 residents of the municipality who were employed in some capacity, of which females made up 34.6% of the workforce. As of 2000 there were 77 residents who worked in the municipality, while 245 residents worked outside Lohn and 33 people commuted into the municipality for work.

As of 2008, there is 1 restaurant and the hospitality industry in Lohn employs 2 people.

== Education ==
The Schule Büttenhardt-Lohn, including a preschool campus in Lohn, Lohn and primary campuses in Büttenhardt (years 1-3) and Lohn (years 4-6), serves Büttenhardt. The Büttenhardt and Lohn primary schools consolidated in the 2008-2009 school year. Büttenhardt children began attending the Lohn preschool in the 2009-2010 school year.
