= Stetten, Schaffhausen =

Stetten
- Municipality
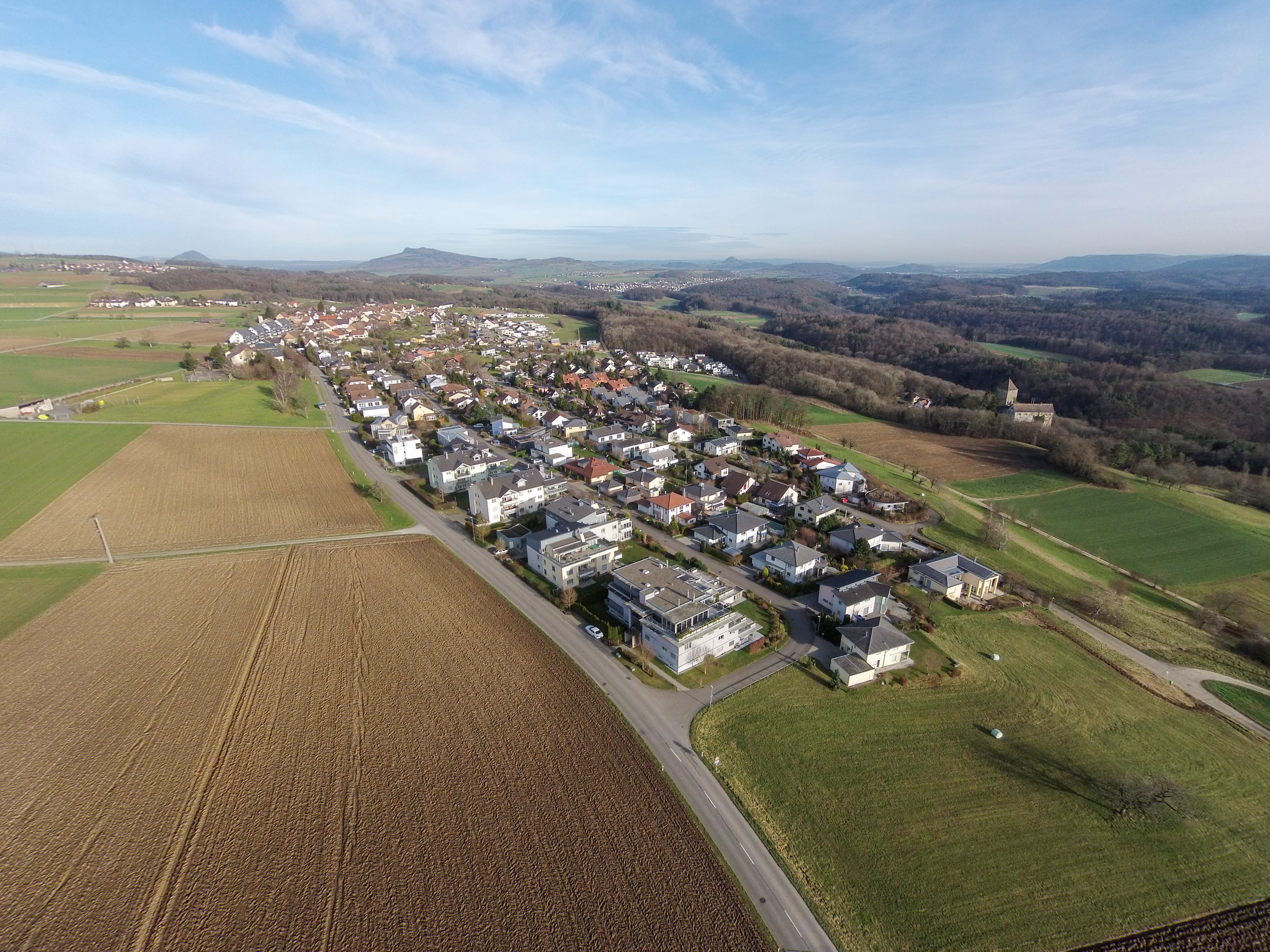

- Flag Coat of arms
- Location of Stetten
- Location within Switzerland Location within Canton of Schaffhausen
- Coordinates: 47°44′N 8°39′E
- Country: Switzerland
- Canton: Schaffhausen
- District: n.a.

Area
  - Total: 4.73 km^{2} (1.83 sq mi)
- Elevation: 579 m (1,900 ft)

Population (December 2008)
  - Total: 1,084
  - Density: 229/km^{2} (594/sq mi)
- Time zone: UTC+01:00 (CET)
  - Summer (DST): UTC+02:00 (CEST)
- Postal code: 8234
- SFOS number: 2919
- ISO 3166 code: CH-SH
- Surrounded by: Büttenhardt, Lohn, Schaffhausen, Thayngen
- Website: www.stetten.ch

Stetten (German pronunciation: [ˈʃtɛtn̩]) is a municipality in the canton of Schaffhausen in Switzerland.

== Geography ==
Aerial view (1960)

Stetten has an area, as of 2006, of 4.7 km^{2} (1.8 sq mi). Of this area, 45.6% is used for agricultural purposes, while 44.9% is forested. Of the rest of the land, 9.3% is settled (buildings or roads) and the remainder (0.2%) is non-productive (rivers or lakes).

== Coat of arms ==
The blazon of the municipal coat of arms is Gules, a Moon increscent Or.

== Demographics ==
Stetten has a population (as of 2008) of 1,084, of which 16.7% are foreign nationals. Of the foreign population, (as of 2008), 47.3% are from Germany, 10.2% are from Italy, 2.7% are from Serbia, 0.5% are from Macedonia, 0.5% are from Turkey, and 38.7% are from another country. Over the last 10 years the population has grown at a rate of 42.1%. Most of the population (as of 2000) speaks German (94.0%), with English being second most common ( 1.4%) and Danish being third ( 1.4%).

The age distribution of the population (as of 2008) is children and teenagers (0–19 years old) make up 25.9% of the population, while adults (20–64 years old) make up 59.6% and seniors (over 64 years old) make up 14.5%.

In the 2007 federal election the most popular party was the SVP which received 42.3% of the vote. The next two most popular parties were the FDP (32.4%), and the SP (25.3%) .

In Stetten about 87.9% of the population (between age 25–64) have completed either non-mandatory upper secondary education or additional higher education (either university or a Fachhochschule). In Stetten, as of 2007, 3.31% of the population attend kindergarten or another pre-school, 8.04% attend a Primary School, 4.64% attend a lower level Secondary School, and 3.6% attend a higher level Secondary School.

As of 2000, 20.3% of the population belonged to the Roman Catholic Church and 60.7% belonged to the Swiss Reformed Church.

The historical population is given in the following table:

year	population
1990	670
2000	889

== Economy ==
Stetten has an unemployment rate of 0.84%. As of 2005, there were 18 people employed in the primary economic sector and about 8 businesses involved in this sector. 22 people are employed in the secondary sector and there are 5 businesses in this sector. 62 people are employed in the tertiary sector, with 20 businesses in this sector.

As of 2008 the mid year average unemployment rate was 1.1%. There were 32 non-agrarian businesses in the municipality and 24.5% of the (non-agrarian) population was involved in the secondary sector of the economy while 75.5% were involved in the third. At the same time, 55.5% of the working population was employed full-time, and 44.5% was employed part-time. There were 110 residents of the municipality who were employed in some capacity, of which females made up 46.4% of the workforce. As of 2000 there were 62 residents who worked in the municipality, while 319 residents worked outside Stetten and 43 people commuted into the municipality for work.

As of 2008, there is 1 restaurant and the hospitality industry in Stetten employs 2 people.

== Heritage sites of national significance ==
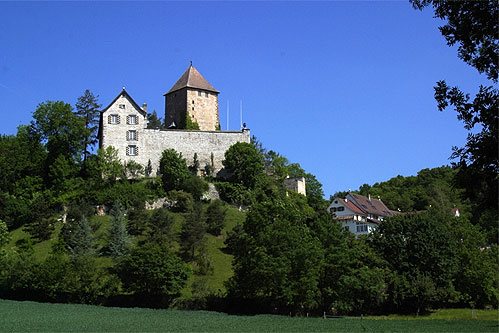
Schloss Herblingen

Herblingen Castle is listed as a Swiss heritage site of national significance.
