= Time in Germany =

Time in Europe: Light Blue / Western European Time / Greenwich Mean Time (UTC); Blue / Western European Time / Greenwich Mean Time (UTC); Blue / Western European Summer Time / British Summer Time / Irish Standard Time (UTC+1); Red / Central European Time (UTC+1); Red / Central European Summer Time (UTC+2); Yellow / Eastern European Time / Kaliningrad Time (UTC+2); Ochre / Eastern European Time (UTC+2); Ochre / Eastern European Summer Time (UTC+3); Green / Moscow Time / Turkey Time (UTC+3); Turquoise / Armenia Time / Azerbaijan Time / Georgia Time / Samara Time (UTC+4); ▉▉▉▉ Pale hues: Standard time observed all year ▉▉▉ Dark hues: Daylight saving time

The time zone in Germany is Central European Time (Mitteleuropäische Zeit, MEZ; UTC+01:00) and Central European Summer Time (Mitteleuropäische Sommerzeit, MESZ; UTC+02:00). Daylight saving time is observed from the last Sunday in March (02:00 CET) to the last Sunday in October (03:00 CEST). The doubled hour during the switch back to standard time is named 2A (02:00 to 03:00 CEST) and 2B (02:00 to 03:00 CET).

== IANA time zone database ==
The IANA time zone database contains two zones for Germany, "Europe/Berlin" and "Europe/Busingen", although in 1945, the Trizone did not follow Berlin's switch to midsummer time.

Germany had been politically divided into East Germany and West Germany at and after the start of the Unix epoch, which is the date from which the tz database wants to record correct information. The database aims to include at least one zone for every ISO 3166-1 alpha-2 country code. This list was first issued in 1997, after the reunification of Germany in 1990. Hence only the unified Germany is listed.

The zone Europe/Busingen was created in the 2013a release of the tz database, because since the Unix time epoch in 1970, Büsingen has shared clocks with Zurich. Büsingen did not observe DST in 1980 like the rest of West Germany, but did so from 1981 after Switzerland adopted DST. Büsingen is a German exclave located in Switzerland. That's why Swiss regulations apply in some cases.

c.c.	Coordinates	Timezone name	Comments	UTC offset (Std.)	UTC offset (DST)
DE	+5230+01322	Europe/Berlin	most of Germany	+01:00	+02:00
DE	+4742+00841	Europe/Busingen	Busingen	+01:00	+02:00

== Daylight saving time ==
Daylight saving time was first introduced during World War I by the German Empire in the years 1916 to 1918. After the end of the war and the proclamation of the Weimar Republic in November 1918, daylight saving time ceased to be observed. It was used again 1940–1949 (from 1945 differently in the West and East) and introduced again from 1980. West and East Germany had the same time and DST from 1950 until unification. In 1996, daylight saving time was harmonised throughout the European Union by Directive 2000/84/EC, which moved the end of DST to the last Sunday in October.

In 1980 the exclave Büsingen did not use DST in order to keep to the same time as Switzerland.

== Historical colonies ==
Until 1920 Germany had several colonies on other continents. The largest were: Cameroon, Namibia, Togoland (Ghana and Togo), German East Africa (Kenya, Tanzania etc) and German New Guinea.

There are some entries in the time zone databases about these countries before 1918 when Germany lost control over them:

- Cameroon adopted West Africa Time=GMT-1 in 1912.
- Accra, Ghana used its solar time which was -0:00:52, nearly the same as GMT due to its longitude of 0°12′W.
- Lomé, Togo used its solar time of 0:04:52 until 1893, then GMT.
- Windhoek, Namibia used its solar time of +1:08:24 until 1892, then GMT+1:30.
- Nairobi, Kenya used its solar time of +2:27:16 until 1908, then GMT+2:30.
- Dar es Salaam, Tanzania used solar time until after 1920.
- New Guinea used solar time until 1895, then GMT+10.

These time zones were partly changed after being transferred to other colonial powers in 1918-1920. See also Time in Africa.

== See also ==
- List of time zones
