= Büsingen am Hochrhein =

- Municipality
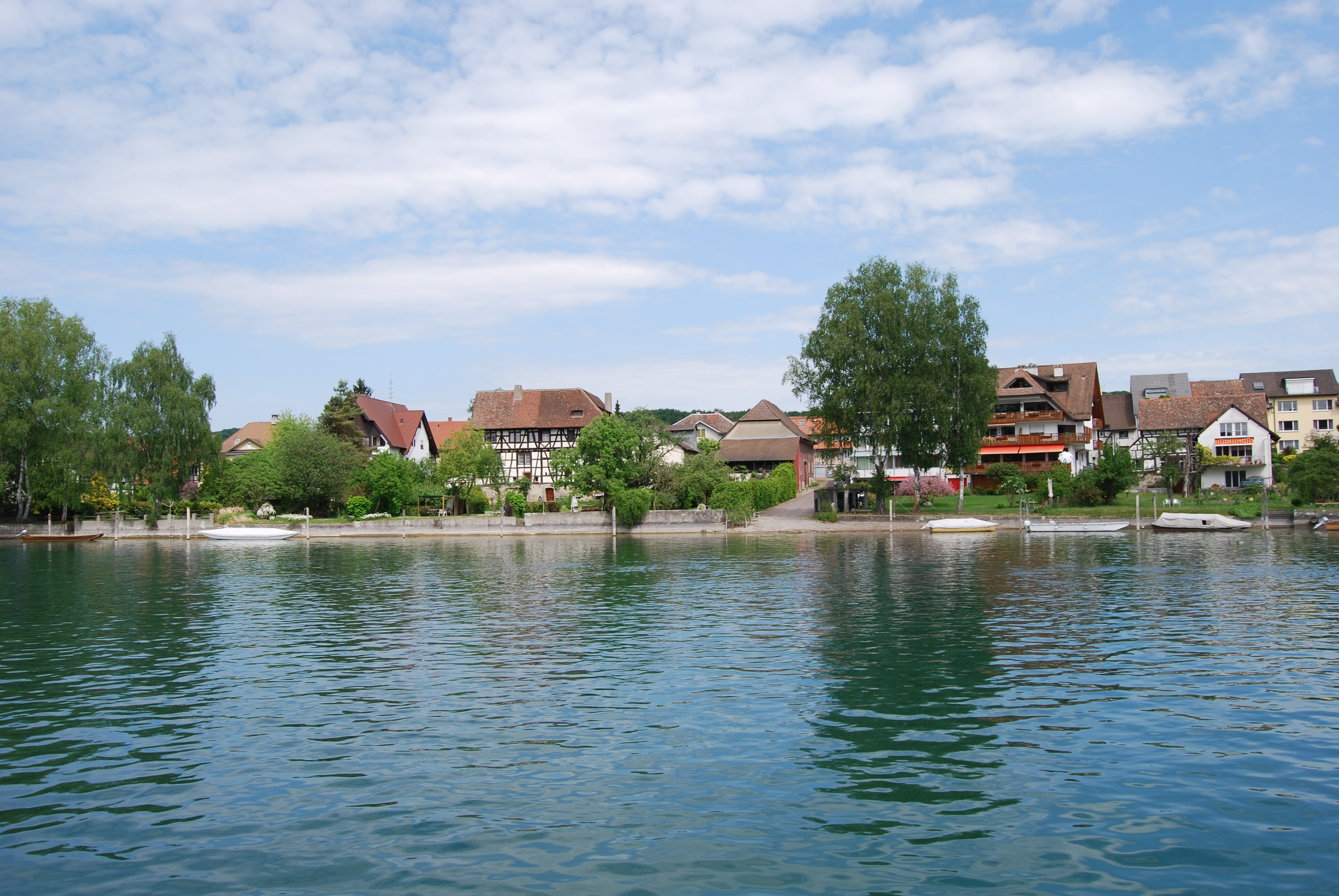

- Flag Coat of arms

- Location of Büsingen am Hochrhein within Konstanz district
- Interactive map of Büsingen am Hochrhein
- Location within Germany Location within Baden-Württemberg
- Coordinates: 47°41′49″N 08°41′25″E
- Country: Germany
- State: Baden-Württemberg
- Admin. region: Freiburg
- District: Konstanz

Government
  - Mayor (2020–28): Vera Schraner

Area
  - Total: 7.62 km^{2} (2.94 sq mi)
- Elevation: 385 m (1,263 ft)

Population (2025-12-31)
  - Total: 1,439
  - Density: 189/km^{2} (489/sq mi)
- Time zone: UTC+01:00 (CET)
  - Summer (DST): UTC+02:00 (CEST)
- Postal codes: DE-78266; CH-8238
- Vehicle registration: BÜS
- Website: www.buesingen.de www.buesingen.ch

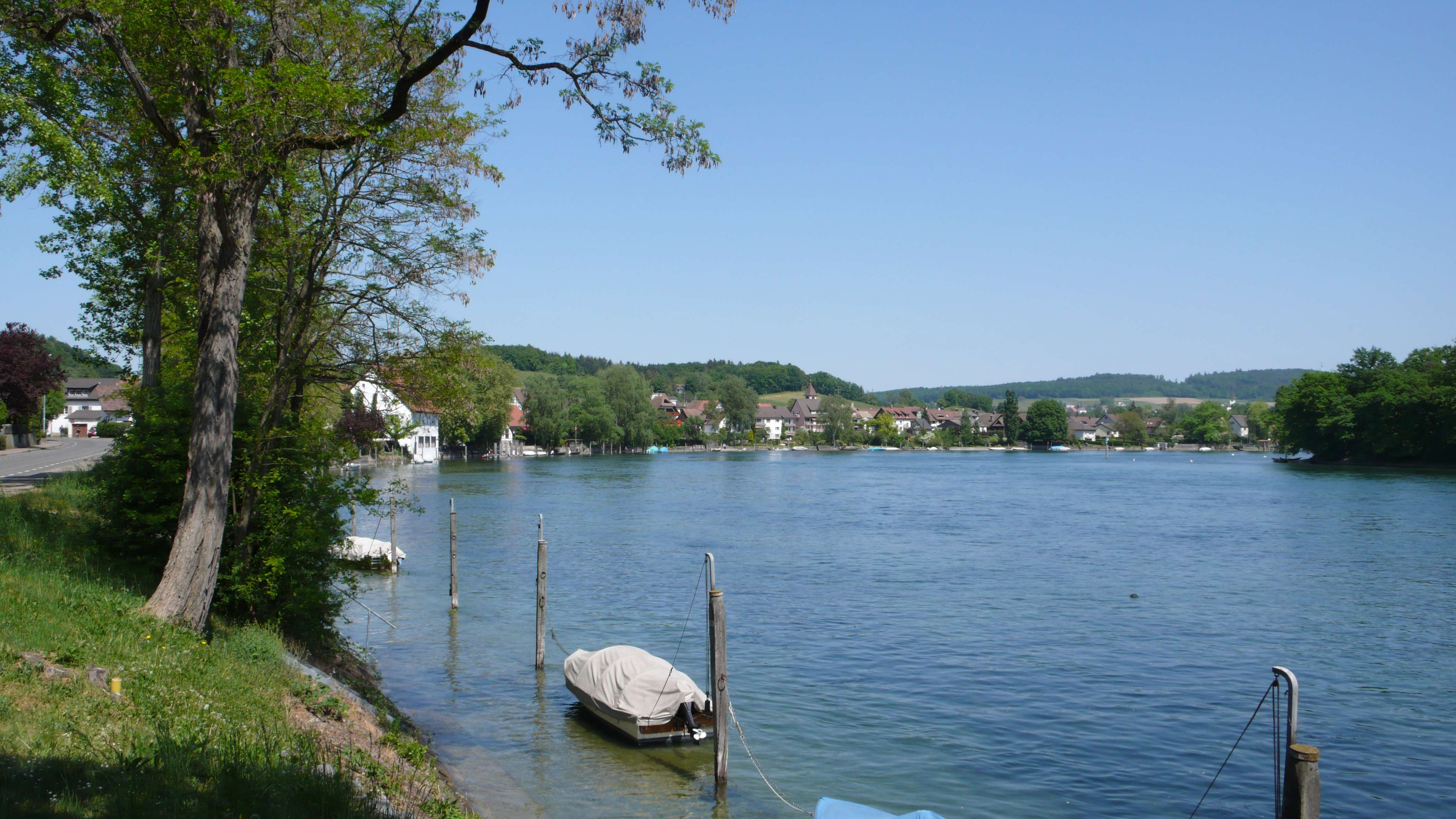
Büsingen am Hochrhein

Büsingen am Hochrhein (German: [ˈbyːzɪŋən ʔam ˈhoːxʁaɪn], lit. 'Büsingen on the High Rhine'; Alemannic: Büesinge am Hochrhi, pronounced [ˈbyəzɪŋə am ˈhoːçri]), often known simply as Büsingen, is a German municipality (7.62 km^{2} [2.94 sq mi]) in the south of Baden-Württemberg with a population of about 1,548 inhabitants. It is an exclave of Germany and Baden-Württemberg, and an enclave of Switzerland, entirely surrounded by the Swiss cantons of Schaffhausen, Zürich, and Thurgau. It is separated from the rest of Germany by a narrow strip of land (at its narrowest, about 680 m [2,230 ft] wide) containing the Swiss village of Dörflingen. Büsingen is approximately 5 km (3.1 mi) from the town of Schaffhausen and 3 km (1.9 mi) from Dörflingen, the nearest village. Its status as an exclave dates to before the formation of the modern German and Swiss states, having previously been a detached part of Further Austria, the Kingdom of Württemberg and the Grand Duchy of Baden.

Politically, Büsingen is part of Germany, forming part of the district of Konstanz, but, economically, it forms part of the Swiss customs union, along with the principality of Liechtenstein and up until 2019, albeit unofficially, the Italian village of Campione d'Italia. As such, there have been no border controls between Switzerland and Büsingen since 4 October 1967. Büsingen am Hochrhein is one of the special territories of members of the European Economic Area.

Büsingen is a holiday destination for much of the year and attracts a significant number of visitors from around the region as well as from further afield, for its recreational areas along the Rhine and proximity to the Rheinfall waterfalls in nearby Neuhausen am Rheinfall. Many dwellings in Büsingen are holiday flats that are accompanied by a number of small guest houses.

== History ==
In the Middle Ages, Büsingen was part of the Landgraviate of Nellenburg, whose Landeshoheit came under Habsburg (Austrian) control in 1465. From then until 1805 Nellenburg formed part of Further Austria, a collection of various scattered Austrian possessions in Swabia. Austrian sovereignty did not go unchallenged by the Confederate Swiss of neighbouring Schaffhausen; an incident in 1693 in which Austrian feudal lord Eberhard Im Thurn was abducted and incarcerated by Swiss authorities, and the subsequent diplomatic dispute, played a particular role in the village being kept away from Swiss control.

In 1805, during the Napoleonic Wars, Austria was forced to cede Further Austria to Napoleon's allies in the Peace of Pressburg; Büsingen became part of the Kingdom of Württemberg. In 1810, it passed to the Grand Duchy of Baden in a border treaty between Württemberg and Baden; these borders were confirmed by the Congress of Vienna in 1815. In 1871, Baden, including Büsingen, became part of the German Empire.

In 1918, after the First World War, a referendum was held in Büsingen in which 96% of voters voted to become part of Switzerland. However no land transfer took place as Switzerland could not offer anything suitable in exchange. Later attempts to transfer the village to Swiss sovereignty were unsuccessful and, consequently, Büsingen has remained an exclave of Germany ever since.

During the Second World War, Switzerland effectively shut down the border, leaving Büsingen cut off from the rest of the Third Reich. German soldiers on home leave were required to deposit their weapons at the border guards' posts in Gailingen am Hochrhein. The Swiss customs officers would then supply them with greatcoats to cover up their German uniforms for the duration of their short journey through Dörflingen (Swiss territory) to their homes in Büsingen.

By the time of the Yalta Conference in early 1945, a complete German defeat was inevitable. The inter-zonal borders of Allied-occupied Germany were finalized at this conference, with Büsingen assigned to the French zone. Once again, the Swiss government refused to consider annexing the town on the grounds that any transfer of territory could only be negotiated with a sovereign German government, which ceased to exist following the German surrender. From the Swiss perspective, any unilateral annexation of the territory of her defeated neighbour (no matter how small) would have been viewed both within and outside Switzerland as a tacit recognition of the victors' right to also adjust Germany's postwar borders. While German-speaking Swiss had not generally been sympathetic to Nazism, public opinion in Switzerland was often critical of elements of the post-war settlement, including the permanent removal of Germany's easternmost territories and the expulsion of ethnic Germans from those regions; hence it would have been controversial within Switzerland for its government to act in a similar manner, with respect to Büsingen.

Nevertheless, the Swiss shared Allied concerns that the exclave might become a haven for Nazi war criminals; thus, an agreement was quickly reached to allow limited numbers of French soldiers to cross Switzerland for the purpose of maintaining law and order in Büsingen. Following the formation of the Federal Republic (West Germany), Büsingen became part of the new state of Baden-Württemberg in 1952 (until then it was part of (South) Baden).

On 9 September 1957, a conference between Switzerland and West Germany was held in Locarno, with the aim of regulating the jurisdictions of both countries in Büsingen.

Büsingen's official name was altered from Büsingen (Oberrhein) to Büsingen am Hochrhein on 6 December 1961.

A treaty signed much later (on 23 November 1964) came into effect on 4 October 1967. The exclave of Büsingen was formally defined in this treaty. At the same time, the West German exclave of Verenahof, consisting of just three houses and eleven West German citizens, became part of Switzerland, whilst Büsingen's de facto customs union with Switzerland, begun in 1947, was made official.

== Geography ==
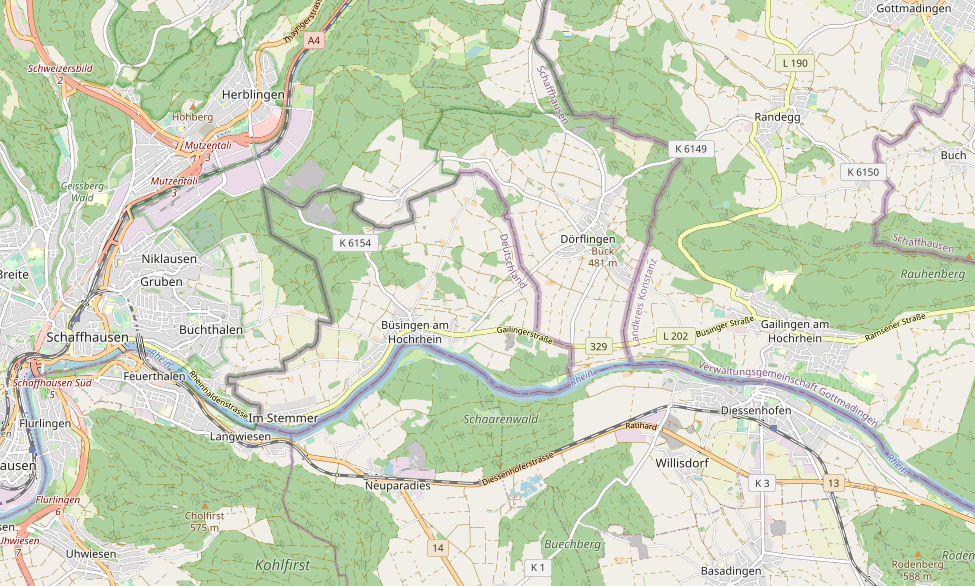
Closeup map of Büsingen am Hochrhein, showing the alignment of borders in the immediate area and the neighbouring city of Schaffhausen

Diagram showing Büsingen am Hochrhein's location relative to Switzerland and Germany

Büsingen am Hochrhein has an area of 762 hectares (1,880 acres). Its border with Switzerland is 17.141 kilometres (10.651 mi) long and is marked by 123 stones. One named stone, the Hattinger Stone, marks the Büsingen-Dörflingen boundary. Along with several other border points, it is situated in the river Rhine.

Büsingen is situated close to the city of Schaffhausen. In the outlying hamlet of Stemmer the border between German and Swiss territory runs down the middle of a road. Houses on one side of the road are in Switzerland, houses on the other side are in Germany.

Büsingen is not part of the customs territory of the European Union but belongs to the Swiss customs territory. Although Büsingen is otherwise a German village, EU economic regulations (other than those covered by Swiss–EU treaties) do not apply there.

Within the territory of Büsingen am Hochrhein are the sites of two abandoned villages Eggingen and Gluringen.

== Peculiarities of Büsingen am Hochrhein ==
=== Currency ===
Büsingen is the only German village in which people pay mostly with Swiss francs, although officially the euro is legal tender as throughout Germany. Until the late 1980s, the Deutsche Mark was not accepted in Büsingen. Even the Büsingen post office accepted only Swiss francs for payment of German stamps. Despite the Deutsche Mark and later the euro being accepted, today Swiss francs are still more popular, since most residents in employment are cross-border commuters working in Switzerland and as such are paid in Swiss francs.

=== Electricity ===
Electricity is provided by Switzerland and as such is billed in Swiss francs with there being no choice of supplier. Wall sockets are generally standard German Schuko sockets, as in the rest of Germany, though some owners may have opted to install Swiss sockets in their properties.

=== Health insurance ===
Residents of Büsingen am Hochrhein can opt to take out a health insurance policy either in Switzerland or in Germany (coverage is mandatory for residents of both countries).

=== Law and policing ===
The treaty between the two countries defines which areas of law are governed by Swiss legislation and which ones come under German legislation. Since there are no border checks between Büsingen and Switzerland, the cantonal police of Schaffhausen are permitted to arrest people in Büsingen and bring them into Switzerland. The number of Swiss police officers is limited to ten at any one time and the number of German police officers to three per 100 inhabitants, which means roughly forty-five, given the current population of around 1,540. German police officers travelling to Büsingen however must use designated routes and refrain from all official acts while crossing Swiss territory.

=== Postal services ===
There is a German post office in Büsingen that also provides Swiss postal services at Swiss inland rates. Büsingen has two postal codes, one German, DE-78266, formerly D-7701, and one Swiss, CH-8238. Letters from Büsingen may be franked with a Swiss or a German stamp. A standard letter from Büsingen to Switzerland needs either an 85 Rappen Swiss stamp or an 80 euro cent German one.

Deutsche Post is responsible for delivering of post (letters and almost all parcels) in Büsingen, though some services are provided by Swiss Post. Other letter and parcel delivery services that operate in Germany such as Hermes do not deliver to Büsingen as they are not authorized to cross into the Swiss customs area to be able to reach the German exclave.

Goods sent from outside of the European customs area may pass through two separate customs checks: the first upon entering Germany proper, the second upon entering Büsingen itself. This can however be avoided by addressing mail shipped to Büsingen as if it were part of Switzerland, using the Swiss postal code. Goods entering Büsingen must comply with Swiss customs rules and are subject to Swiss customs duties and taxes.

=== Telecommunications ===
Residents of Büsingen can be reached by telephone using either a German number (with the prefix +49) or a Swiss one (with the prefix +41) or both, depending on which telephone or internet service provider(s) the resident has opted to have a contract with. Dwellings generally have both countries' phone sockets.

=== School ===
Büsingen has a kindergarten, the current building of which opened in 1987. By 1988, however, it was overcrowded, so the building was extended. Children attend primary school in Büsingen, and subsequently their parents may choose either a Swiss school or a German school for their secondary education.

=== Sports ===
The local football team, FC Büsingen, is the only German team to play in the Swiss Football League.

=== Taxation ===
The much lower Swiss VAT applies to purchases made in Büsingen. It is levied at a rate of 7.7% (compared to general German VAT at 19%) on most commercial exchanges of goods and services. Certain transactions, including those of basic or essential foodstuffs, drugs, books and newspapers, pay the reduced rate of 2.5%. The hotel industry pays 3.7%.

Büsingen residents, regardless of nationality, are treated as third-country nationals with regards to VAT payable in the rest of Germany and the EU. So residents who export purchases made in the EU to Büsingen are able to claim back the VAT paid on those purchases. Imports into Büsingen (via Switzerland) are subject to Swiss import limits, duty and VAT.

Despite further income tax breaks specific to Büsingen, younger Büsingers who work (in Switzerland or Germany) pay approximately double the income tax of their colleagues who reside in neighbouring Swiss areas, causing many young people to move to Switzerland and reducing the village's population in recent years. Büsingen has the highest average age of residents in all of Baden-Württemberg.

Most Büsingen residents are pensioners; many are from Switzerland, for as in the rest of Germany they pay little or no tax on their pensions. This advantage is however progressively being phased out and by 2040 will no longer exist.

Büsingen is one of just a handful of municipalities in Germany which levies no property tax. The business tax levied in Büsingen is the lowest in Baden-Württemberg.

=== Time zone ===
In the time zone database, there is a special area for this place, Europe/Busingen, that had a different time compared to the rest of West Germany in 1980 when West Germany, but not Switzerland, observed daylight saving time.

=== Transport ===
Büsingen is served by Verkehrsbetriebe Schaffhausen with a regular connection to the German village Randegg, the Swiss villages Ramsen, Buch and Dörflingen, as well as the city and railway station of Schaffhausen.

Südbadenbus from Germany also serves the village with bus connections to Gailingen am Hochrhein and Gottmadingen. The bus passes through Swiss territory to reach the main village of Büsingen and the outlying settlement Stemmer.

From spring to autumn, the URh offers regular boat services on the High Rhine and Untersee between Schaffhausen and Kreuzlingen, via Konstanz.

=== Vehicle registration ===
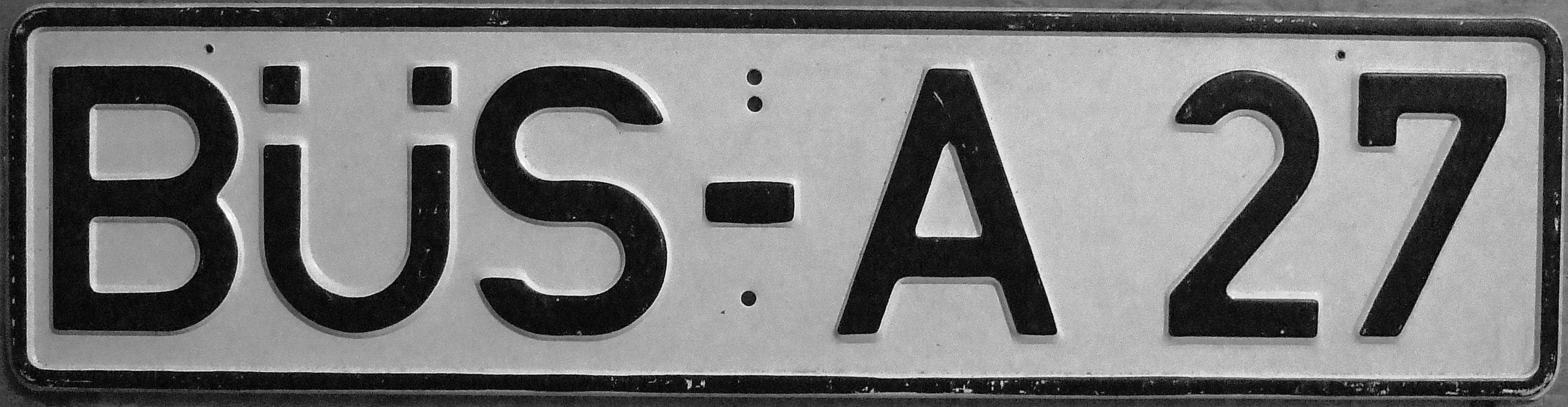
An example of the BÜS licence plate

Büsingen has its own licence plate (BÜS), even though it is part of Constance district, which has the KN sign. These special licence plates were created to simplify the job of Swiss customs officers. Vehicles with BÜS licence plates are treated as if they were Swiss vehicles for customs purposes.

BÜS is one of the rarest licence plates in use in Germany as there are only around 700 in use at any one time. The letters BÜS are almost always followed by an A with the occasional exception for provisionally admitted vehicles or those purchased in Switzerland, which have the letter Z.

== See also ==
- Tägermoos
- Expansion of Switzerland
- Campione d'Italia
- Jungholz
- Llívia
- Verenahof
