= Tengen, Germany =

Tengen
- Town
- Coat of arms

- Location of Tengen within Konstanz district
- Interactive map of Tengen
- Location within Germany Location within Baden-Württemberg
- Coordinates: 47°48′52″N 8°39′33″E
- Country: Germany
- State: Baden-Württemberg
- Admin. region: Freiburg
- District: Konstanz

Government
  - Mayor (2023–31): Selcuk Gök (SPD)

Area
  - Total: 62.04 km^{2} (23.95 sq mi)
- Elevation: 614 m (2,014 ft)

Population (2025-12-31)
  - Total: 4,776
  - Density: 76.98/km^{2} (199.4/sq mi)
- Time zone: UTC+01:00 (CET)
  - Summer (DST): UTC+02:00 (CEST)
- Postal codes: 78250
- Dialling codes: 07736
- Vehicle registration: KN
- Website: www.tengen.de

Tengen (German pronunciation: [ˈtɛŋən]) is a town in the district of Konstanz, in Baden-Württemberg, Germany. It is situated near the border with Switzerland, 14 kilometres (9 miles) north of Schaffhausen.

== Verenahof ==
Verenahof (also known as Büttenharter Hof or Verenahöfe) was a German exclave in Switzerland, administratively part of the German town of Wiechs am Randen (which is now part of the town of Tengen). Geographically, it was separated from Wiechs am Randen by a 200–300-metre wide strip of Swiss territory.

By 1964 a treaty was concluded between Germany and Switzerland, which entered into force on 4 October 1967. The 43-hectare territory, containing three houses and eleven West German citizens, became part of Switzerland.

== Mayors ==
- 1973–2015: Helmut Groß (born 1948 in Crailsheim)
- 2015–2023: Marian Schreier (born 1990 in Stuttgart; SPD)
- since 2023: Selcuk Gök (SPD)

== Education ==
Tengen has a primary school (Grund- u. Werkrealschule Tengen) and a library/school library.

== Sons and daughters of the town ==
- Leutnant Hermann Pfeiffer (1890 in Tengen – 1917 in France) was a World War I flying ace credited with eleven aerial victories
- Otto Sauter (born 1961), piccolo trumpeter, especially in baroque music

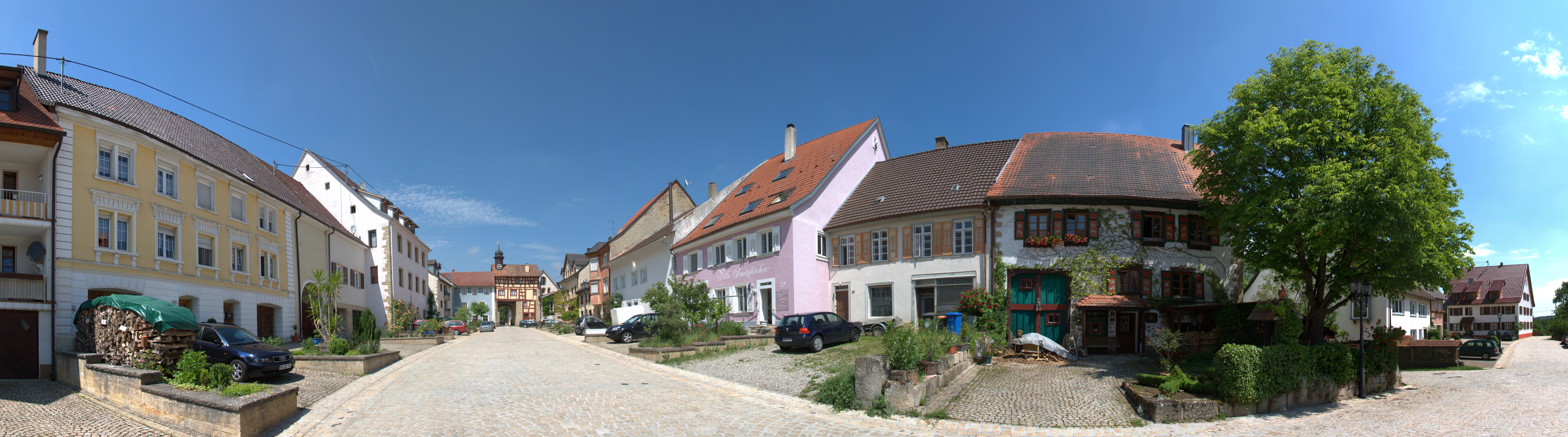
Tengen

== See also ==
- Verenahof
