= Konstanz (Landtag electoral district) =

State electoral district of Germany

56: Konstanz
- Electoral district for the Landtag of Baden-Württemberg
- Konstanz in 2026
- District: Konstanz
- Electorate: 102,441 (2026)
- Major settlements: Allensbach, Gaienhofen, Konstanz, Moos, Öhningen, Radolfzell am Bodensee, and Reichenau

Current electoral district
- Party: Green
- Member: Nese Erikli

Konstanz is an electoral constituency (German: Wahlkreis) represented in the Landtag of Baden-Württemberg.

Since 2026, it has elected one member via first-past-the-post voting. Voters cast a second vote under which additional seats are allocated proportionally state-wide. Under the constituency numbering system, it is designated as constituency 56.

It is wholly within the district of Konstanz.

== Geography ==
The constituency includes the municipalities of Allensbach, Gaienhofen, Konstanz, Moos, Öhningen, Radolfzell am Bodensee, and Reichenau within the district of Konstanz.

There were 102,441 eligible voters in 2026.

== Members ==
=== First mandate ===
Both prior to and since the electoral reforms for the 2026 election, the winner of the plurality of the vote (first-past-the-post) in every constituency won the first mandate.

Election	Member	Party	%
1976	Klaus von Trotha	CDU	
1980	Klaus von Trotha	CDU	
1984	Klaus von Trotha	CDU	
1988	Klaus von Trotha	CDU	
1992	Klaus von Trotha	CDU	
1996	Klaus von Trotha	CDU	
2001	Andreas Hoffmann	CDU	39.7
2006	Andreas Hoffmann	CDU	40.6
2011	Siegfried Lehmann	Grüne	34.7
2016	Nese Erikli	Grüne	39.6
2021	Nese Erikli	Grüne	42.1
2026	Nese Erikli	Grüne	36.8

=== Second mandate ===
Prior to the electoral reforms for the 2026 election, the seats in the state parliament were allocated proportionately amongst parties which received more than 5% of valid votes across the state. The seats that were won proportionally for parties that did not win as many first mandates as seats they were entitled to, were allocated to their candidates which received the highest proportion of the vote in their respective constituencies. This meant that following some elections, a constituency would have one or more members elected under a second mandate.

Prior to 2011, these second mandates were allocated to the party candidates who got the greatest number of votes, whilst from 2011-2021, these were allocated according to percentage share of the vote.

Prior to 1996, this constituency did not elect any members on a second mandate.

Election	Member	Party
1996	Günther Schäfer	Grüne
2001		
2006	Siegfried Lehmann	Grüne
2011		
2016	Jürgen Keck	FDP
2021		

== Election results ==
=== 2026 election ===
State election (2026): Konstanz
Notes:	Blue background denotes the winner of the electorate vote. Pink background denotes a candidate elected from their party list. Yellow background denotes an electorate win by a list member, or other incumbent. A ✓ or ✗ denotes status of any incumbent, win or lose respectively.						
Party	Candidate	Votes	%	±%	Party votes	%	±%
Greens	✓ Nese Erikli	26,354	36.8	▼5.3	29,105	40.5	▼1.6
CDU	Andrea Gnann	19,602	27.3	▲9.2	18,224	25.4	▲7.2
AfD	Steffen Jahnke	7,736	10.8	▲5.0	8,001	11.1	▲5.3
SPD	Frank Ortolf	5,133	7.2	▼1.2	3,576	5.0	▼3.4
Left	Lars Hofmann	4,745	6.6	▲1.3	4,909	6.8	▲1.5
FDP	Patrick Konopka	3,803	5.3	▼6.8	3,270	4.6	▼7.5
FW	Martin Staab	1,952	2.7	▼0.2	1,051	1.5	▼1.5
Volt	Yannick Fiechtner	1,302	1.8	▲1.0	1,055	1.5	▲0.7
BSW	Daniel Niedzwetzki	1,064	1.5		1,119	1.6	
APT					480	0.7	
PARTEI					282	0.4	▼1.3
dieBasis					154	0.2	
ÖDP					115	0.2	▼0.4
Values					109	0.2	
Pensioners					86	0.1	
Bündnis C					81	0.1	
PdF					56	0.1	
KlimalisteBW					43	0.1	▼1.1
Team Todenhöfer					37	0.1	
Humanists					36	0.1	
Verjüngungsforschung					33	0.0	
Informal votes		392			261		
Total valid votes		71,691			71,822		
Turnout		72,083	70.4	▲7.2			
Greens hold	Majority	6,752	9.5				

== See also ==
- Politics of Baden-Württemberg
- Landtag of Baden-Württemberg
