= Höri (Lake Constance) =

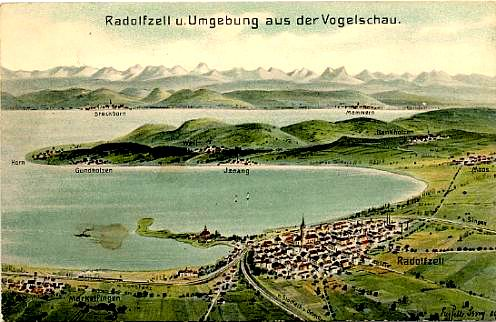
- View of Höri from Radolfzell (1900)

Highest point
- Peak: Schiener Berg
- Elevation: 715.6 m (2,348 ft)
- Coordinates: 47°41′9″N 8°55′9″E

Geography
- Location within Baden-Württemberg

Höri is a peninsula in the west of Lake Constance, between Stein am Rhein and Radolfzell.

== Geography ==
The 45 km^{2} (17 sq mi) large peninsula is located on the Untersee, and makes up the northern shore of the Rheinsee, as well as the southern shore of the Zeller See. The peninsula is made up of the municipalities of Gaienhofen, Moos, and Öhningen, which together make up the Höri Municipal Administration Association (Gemeindeverwaltungsverband Höri). The village of Bohlingen, located in the municipality of Singen (Hohentwiel), is also considered part of the Höri Peninsula, and is referred to as the "Gateway to Höri".

The highest point on Höri is Schiener Berg, which rises to an elevation of 715.6 m (2,348 ft). The lowest point is the shore of the Untersee, located at an elevation of 395.11 m (1,296.3 ft).

== Name ==
The name Höri comes from the fact that it was an area that formerly belonged to the Bishopric of Constance. It was first mentioned in a document from Emperor Barbarossa, in which confirmed various possessions of the Bishop of Constance. In the middle ages, Höri was more often used to refer to closed, self-contained lordship territoies.

In popular folklore, the origin of the name is explained by an exhausted remark by God in Lake Constance Alemannic after creating the world, Jetzt hör i uff! ("Now I'm done").

== Artists ==
Writer Hermann Hesse lived from 1904 to 1912 in Gaienhofen. He, along with Walter Kaesbach, who lived in Hemmenhofen, are considered driving forces of the local art scene. Both attracted many artists, and helped them find accommodation and studios. Painter and graphic artist Walter Waentig purchased Hesse's house in Gaienhofen in 1920.

During the Nazi era, many well-known artists, labeled "degenerates" by the Nazi regime, moved to Höri to be able to flee to nearby Switzerland if necessary.

The terms Höri-Künstler and Höri-Maler ("Höri Painters" / "Höri Artists") emerged as a result, although the artists were less connected by art style and more by a shared possibility of escape to Switzerland. Many well known artists such as Walter Kaesbach, director of the Düsseldorf Art Academy, Max Ackermann, Erich Heckel, co-founder of the artist group Die Brücke, Otto Dix, a member of the artist's association Young Rheinland, Ferdinand Macketanz, Hans Sauerbruch, Curth Georg Becker, Walter Herzger, Rudolf Stuckert, Rose Marie Stuckert-Schnorrenberg, Jean Paul Schmitz, and publisher Curt Weller found a new home in the idyllic countryside near the Swiss border.

Many of their works feature the shoreline image of Lake Constance's Untersee and the scenery of neighboring Hegau. The mediterranean character of the former, combined with the volcanic cones of Hegau provides for unique and distinct common subject.

Even in the early 21st century, many artists remain in the region and numerous studios shape community life in many ways.
