= Karl Friedrich Gegauf =

Swiss inventor

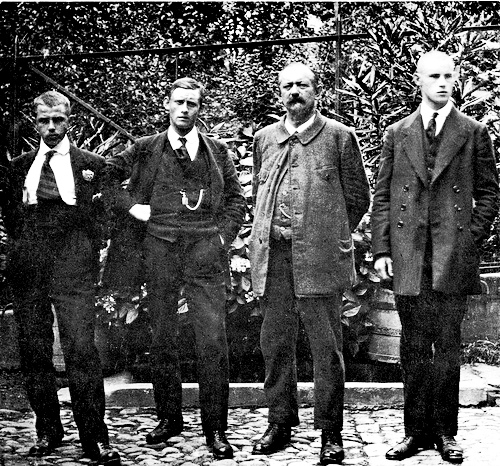
Karl Friedrich Gegauf (third from left) and his sons

Karl Friedrich Gegauf (born November 9, 1860, in Stockach - died December 13, 1926, in Steckborn) was a Swiss entrepreneur and inventor. He was the founder of Bernina International, a Swiss sewing machine factory.

== Early life and education ==
Karl Friedrich Gegauf was born in 1860 in Stockach (Baden-Württemberg). In 1876, he completed a mechanical apprenticeship in Hindelwangen (modern-day district of Stockach) and Radolfzell and in 1880 became employee of the embroidery machine factory "Georg Baum" in Rorschach. From 1886, Gegauf produced embroidery in Tägerwilen at Okenfiner house, where he also invented the monogram embroidery machine.

== Career ==
In the spring of 1890 he moved to Steckborn in Thurgau. There, with his brother Georg Gegauf, he founded the "Gebrüder Gegauf" company. The company included an embroidery and a workshop for the production of a monogram embroidery machine that he invented. In 1892, he developed the first hollow hem sewing machine and received Swiss patent No. 4670. After a fire in 1895, the company concentrated entirely on the production of hollow hem sewing machines. It was so successful that the term "Gegaufe" became synonymous with the mechanical production of high fringes. The outbreak of World War I was a major blow to Gegauf's business as the export of machines was prohibited.

After the war, in 1919, Gegauf founded his own company under the name "Karl Friedrich Gegauf". After the opening of the Steckborn art silk factory in 1923/1924, he developed an under-binding or fitz machine for artificial silk, which was ready for production in 1926 and was also a mainstay of the company until 1932, when the Bernina machine was introduced.

Karl Friedrich Gegauf died on December 13, 1926. His sons Fritz (1893 – 1980) and Gustav took over the factory.

== Family ==
Karl Friedrich Gegauf was the son of Johann Georg, a doctor in Wahlwies. He married Maria Troll in 1888 in Schwarzach (Vorarlberg). They had the three sons Ernst, Fritz, Gustav and a daughter Hilda. After the death of his first wife in 1900, Gegauf married Maria Haug in the same year in Mühlhausen-Ehingen. In March 1907, Gegauf and his whole family settled in Switzerland and took up the Swiss citizenship.

== Trivia ==
Karl Friedrich Gegauf became the first car owner in Thurgau in 1890.
