= Schiener Berg =

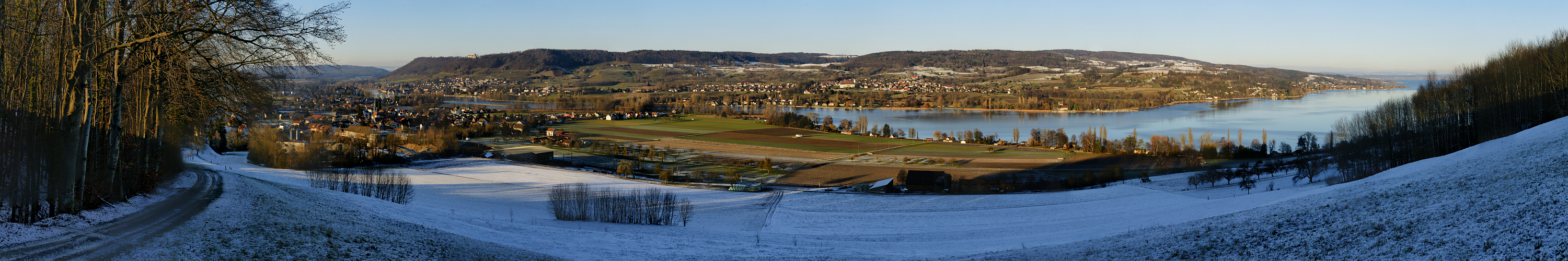
- View from a viewing point near Freudenfels Castle between Eschenz and Klingenzell (CH), over Eschenz and the Untersee to the Schienerberg – including Wangen (r), Öhningen (m; GE) and Stein am Rhein (l; CH)

Highest point
- Peak: unnamed kuppe near Ferdinandslust, near Schienen (GE)
- Elevation: 715.6 m above NHN

Geography
- Location within Alps
- State(s): between Horn (Constance, Baden-Württemberg, Germany) and Stein am Rhein (Stein, Schaffhausen, Switzerland)
- Range coordinates: 47°41′08″N 8°55′11″E
- Parent range: Southwest Hegau Uplands

Geology
- Rock type: Molasse

The Schiener Berg, also called the Schienerberg, is a hill ridge between Horn in the county of Constance in the German state of Baden-Württemberg and Stein am Rhein in the district of Stein, in the Swiss canton of Schaffhausen. It is up to 715.6 m above sea level (NHN) and part of the Lake Constance peninsula of Höri in the Southwest Hegau Uplands. The name is derived from the settlement of Schienen, which is roughly in the centre of the region.

== Geography ==
=== Location ===
The Schiener Berg lies west of the Untersee, the smaller of the two lakes forming Lake Constance between these settlements (viewed clockwise around Schienen, 600 m, beginning in the northwest): Arlen to the northwest, Worblingen to the north-northwest, Bohlingen to the north, Bankholzen, Bettnang, Weiler and Iznang to the northeast, Gundholzen and Horn to the east, Gaienhofen to the east-southeast, Hemmenhofen to the southeast, Wangen to the south-southeast and Kattenhorn and Öhningen to the south; they all belong to the county of Constance (Konstanz) and, apart from the first four, lie on the Untersee or its arm, the Zeller See. On Swiss soil, it is bounded by the following settlements in the canton of Schaffhausen: Stein am Rhein to the southwest, Hemishofen to the west-southwest, Wilen to the west and Ramsen to the west-northwest.

=== Mountains and hills ===
The Schiener Berg is up to 715.6 m high, which it reaches at a point that lies about 1.5 km east of Schienen roughly east-northeast of Ferdinandslust and approximately northwest and above the source of the Klingerbach stream. The greatest height is often cited as 708 m, this point is around 1.7 km east-northeast of Schienen. The mountains, hills and spurs of the ridge include the following – sorted by height in metres (m) above Normalhöhennull (NHN) (GE) and Meter über Meer (m ü. M.) (CH):

- unnamed summit near Ferdinandslust (715,6 m), near Schienen (D)
- unnamed summit near the Ewigkeit (ca. 708 m), near Schienen (D)
- unnamed summit at the Brand/Wittmisried (660,4 m), near Bohlingen (D)
- Kressenberg (ca. 624 m), near Schienen (D)
- unnamed summit at the Schlossbühl (617,5 m), near Weiler (D)
- Wolkensteinerberg (ca. 608 m), near Hemishofen (CH)
- Kastenbühl (587,4 m), near Bohlingen (D)
- Salen (581,2 m), near Wangen (D)
- unnamed summit at the Blatt (503,9 m), near Weiler (D)
