= Konzertsegel =

Coordinates: 47.734824°N 8.971316°E

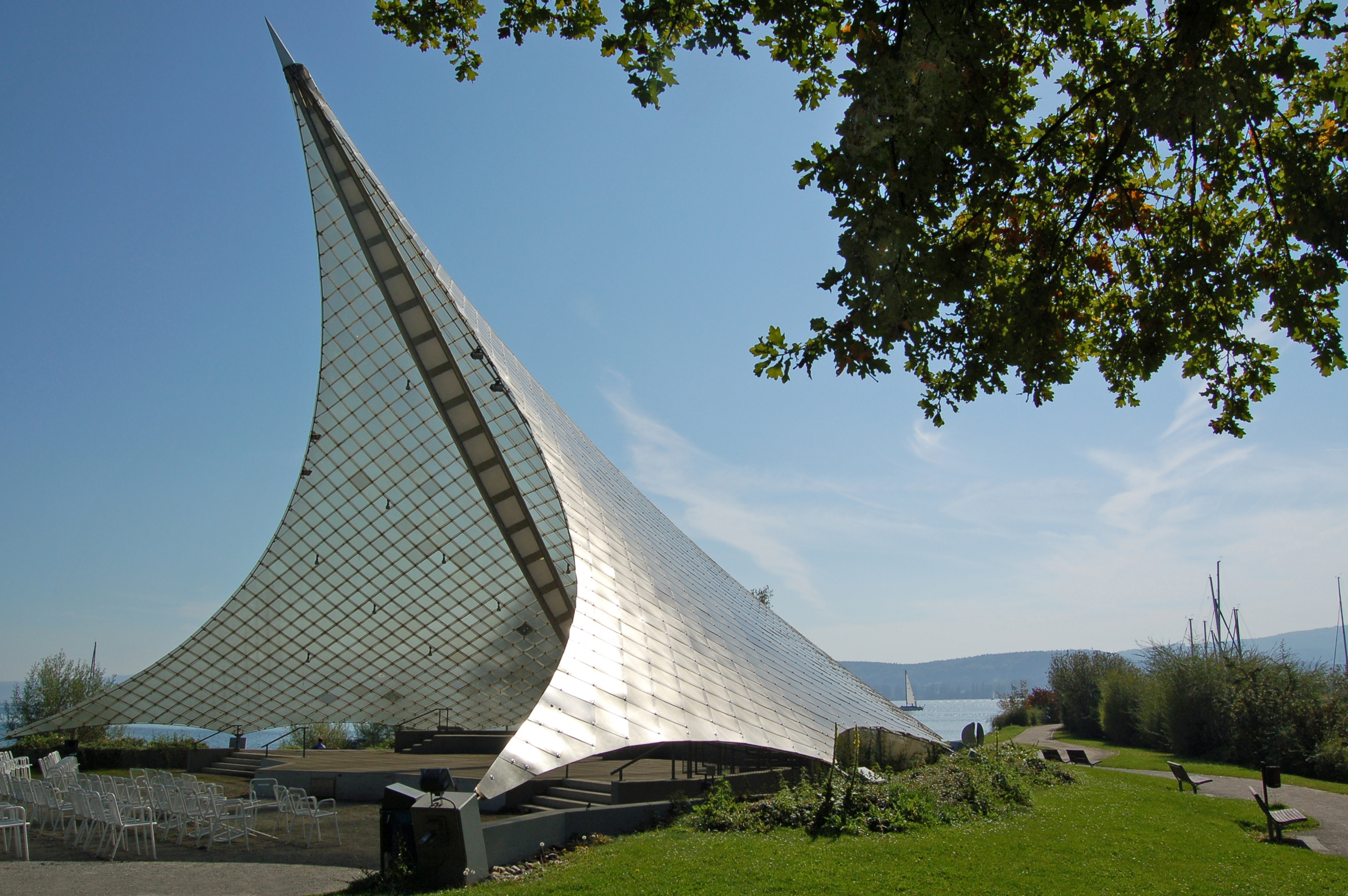
Konzertsegel in Radolfzell

The Konzertsegel (Concert sail) is an open-air stage on the shore beside Lake Constance in the town of Radolfzell. It was built in 1989 and is in the shape of a large sail made to look like a fishing net. It is a protected monument.

== History ==
The shape was a prototype for the German Pavilion at the Seville Expo '92, since dismantled. The sail has an area of 340 square meters and was built at a cost of around 700,000 DM.

The concert area was part of the city redevelopment in the middle of the 1980s. The old lake embankments were removed and a more natural shoreline was created. The design of the Konzertsegel reflected this. Since then it is one of the landmarks of the town. The plastic covers are regularly replaced due to vandalism.
