= Yvonne Escher =

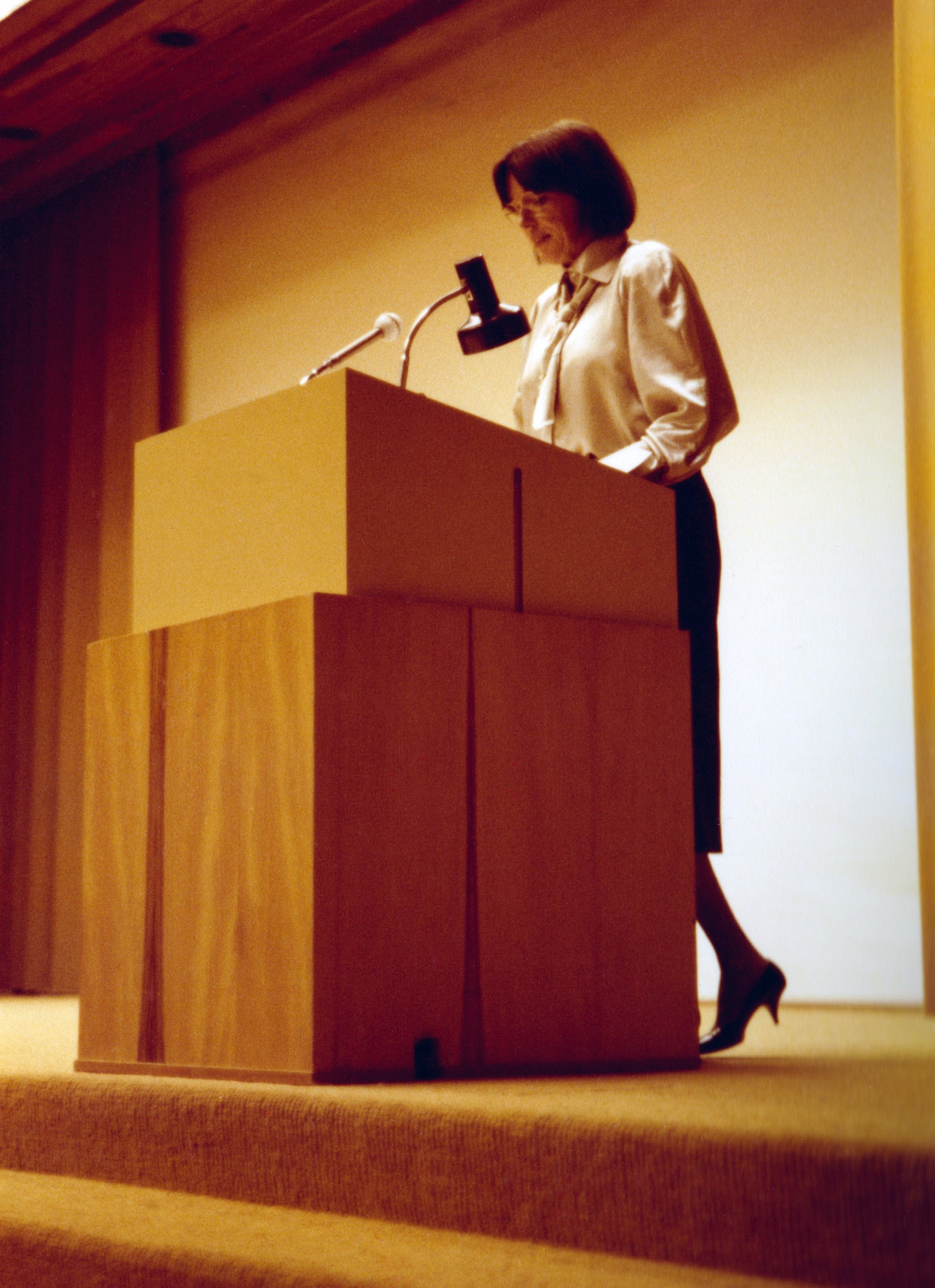
Yvonne Escher at the Premiere of her Film «Rebzeiten», 1985

Yvonne Escher (born 9 February 1934 in Stein am Rhein, Switzerland; died 25 January 2025 in Steckborn) was a Swiss filmmaker, director, and author whose work focused on documentary films about rural life and professional environments in Switzerland. She received notable recognition for her contributions to regional culture, especially as a chronicler of local stories from the Canton of Thurgau.

== Biography ==
Yvonne Escher spent her childhood and youth in Steckborn, where both her parents worked in a rayon factory. After completing business school in Konstanz in 1952, she moved to Zürich, and subsequently to Cologne, where she attended drama school. Her career began with a strong connection to European cinema, including work as an actress in the film Antoine et Cléopâtre (1966). Through personal relationships, Escher became involved in the filmmaking scenes of Geneva and Rome, collaborating and networking with filmmakers such as Francis Reusser, Carlo Di Carlo, Michelangelo Antonioni, and Pier Paolo Pasolini.

Escher returned to Switzerland in 1977 and became an active participant in the cultural scene of Steckborn, co-founding a local theatre group that evolved into the Phönix Theatre. She founded her own production company, Bodensee-Film, in 1982 and devoted herself to documenting everyday life and professions around Lake Constance. From the 1980s onwards, she produced several films, often focusing on everyday life and women’s stories in the Lake Constance region. Her work was recognised with the Thurgau Cultural Prize in 2001.

== Filmmaking and artistic approach ==
Yvonne Escher’s films focused on people with unusual biographies, regional traditions, and social fringe situations. She saw cinematic portraiture as a tool for understanding and compassion. Her documentary practice was marked by unintrusive, respectful proximity and by letting people speak for themselves—deliberately rejecting voyeurism or judgment. She often highlighted that, as someone who had herself felt like an outsider, she naturally gravitated toward “othered” individuals and communities. Through her work, Escher contributed significantly to public understanding of regional culture and social diversity, with many of her productions supported by Swiss broadcasting stations.

== Awards ==
For her contributions to documentary film and regional culture, Escher received multiple honours, notably the Thurgauer Kulturpreis in 2001.

== Filmography ==
- Der See und seine Fischer (1982)
- Rebzeiten (1985) *
- Eine kleine Stadt (1986)
- Antoine und Kleopatra (1966)
- Drei Masken (1972, director)
- Smog (1974)

== Publications ==
- Yvonne Escher: Diese Freiheit nehm ich mir. Aufzeichnungen einer selbstbestimmten Frau. Elfunzehn, Zürich 2019, ISBN 978-3-905769-53-1 (Autobiografie).
- Christof Stillhard: Ein Leben (fast) wie im Film: Zum Tod der Filmerin Yvonne Escher. In: Thurgaukultur.ch. 3. März 2025 (Nachruf).
