= Schiener =

Schiener may refer to the following articles:

== People with last name Schiener ==
- Gretel Schiener (born 1940), a German artistic gymnast

== Others ==
- Schiener Berg, a mountain in Baden-Württemberg, Germany
