= Otto Brusatti =

Austrian radio personality and musicologist

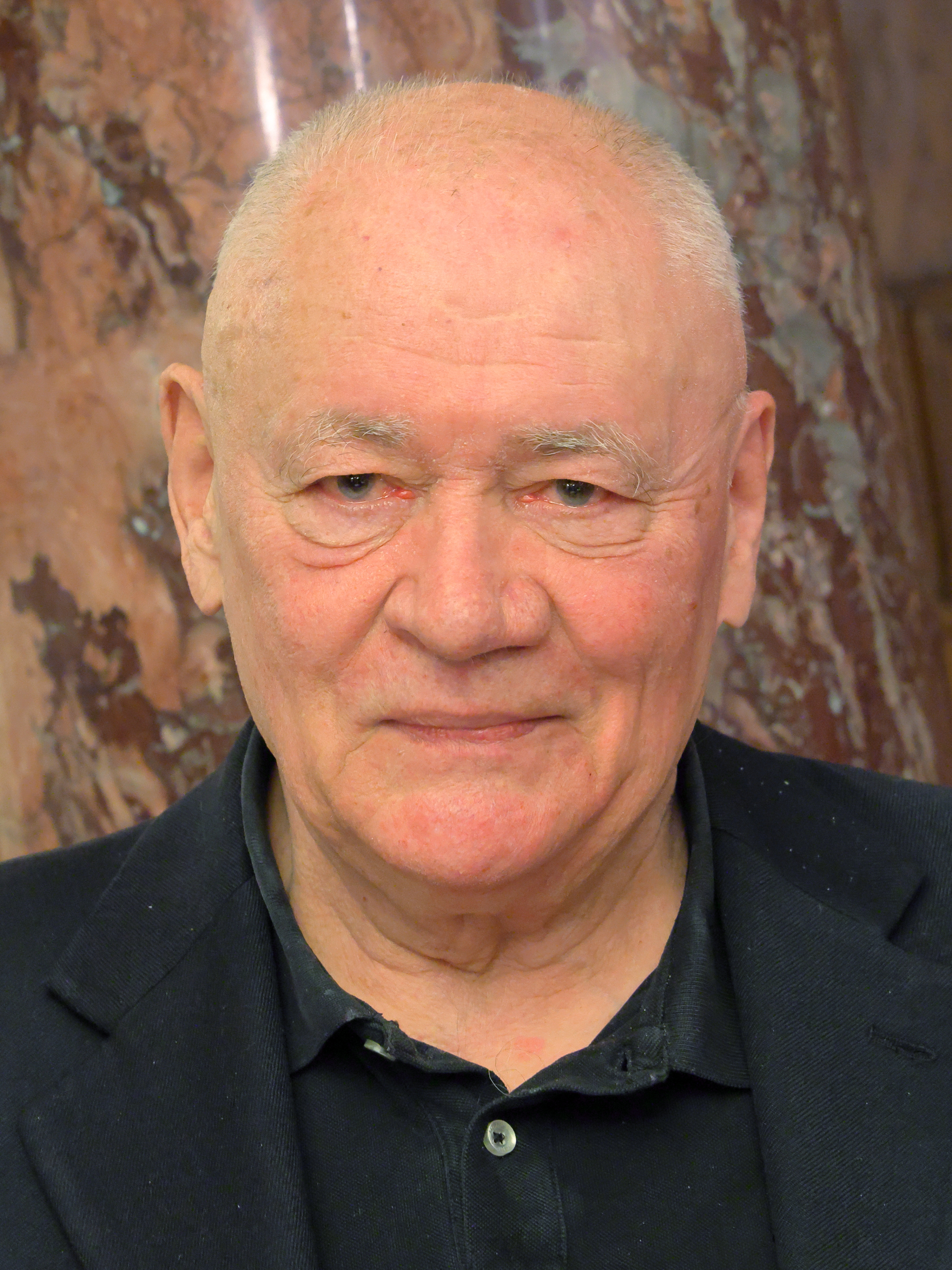
- Born: June 29, 1948 (age 77); Zell am See, Austria
- Occupations: radio personality musicologist

Otto Brusatti (born 29 June 1948) is an Austrian radio personality and musicologist. He has also made a name for himself as an author, director and exhibition organizer.

== Life ==
Born in Zell am See, Brusatti grew up in Baden near Vienna. The son of a couple of professors, Brusatti first aspired to a university career. He studied musicology, history and philosophy and worked in Germany for the WDR. At the beginning of the 1980s, he returned to ORF and began to host the morning show Pasticcio on Ö1, which he still does today. He was also a regular host of the Saturday culture programme Klassik-Treffpunkt, in which he usually invited theatre people or classical musicians to Funkhaus Wien and had them present their favourite music in a portrait. The programme always includes a riddle for the listeners. Brusatti's last classical music meeting point was on 9 September 2017.

Brusatti always presents his shows live without notes and tries to confront his guests with unconventional questions. He also moderates the programmes Apropos Classical and Tonart, presents European Broadcasting Union live concerts, designs major programmes and tries to familiarise his audience with classical music. His first major project was a spoken opera with Will Quadflieg after Gustav Mahler's Symphony No. 3

In 1975, with the protection of the later suspended head of the collection Ernst Hilmar, he was employed in the music collection of the then Wienbibliothek im Rathaus, where he co-organized exhibitions on composers such as Schubert and Mozart, but often took leave of absence for his various extra-professional projects. Brusatti also taught comparative aesthetics at the University of Vienna for several years and worked at the Vienna Burgtheater. He publishes popular science books as well as fiction, poetry and radio plays. He directed ORF productions on the occasion of the Mozart and Sigmund Freud Years. He directed Opera! by Friederike Mayröcker, the ORF Hörspielpreise of the year 2017.

Since 2008 Brusatti has been retired.

== Work ==
- Joseph Lanner (2001)
- Dreimalneunmalleben (2002)
- Josef Strauss – Delirien und Sphärenklänge. (2002)
- Wien, Musik – Eros & Thanatos. (2003)
- Jazik. Eine dalmatinische Novelle. (2004)
- Mozart auf der Reise nach Berlin. Mitteldeutscher Verlag, Halle (Saale) 2005, ISBN 978-3-89812-365-5
- Fest auf A. Ein Franz Schubert Roman. Mitteldeutscher Verlag, Halle (Saale) 2013, ISBN 978-3-89812-980-0
- Im Jahr der Sünden. Eine Novelle über ein geschlitztes Abendkleid, ein Kinderlied, den Tod und zu viele Nonnen. Mitteldeutscher Verlag, Halle (Saale) 2014, ISBN 978-3-95462-338-9
- Das musikalische Opfer. Form und Stimmungen. Mitteldeutscher Verlag, Halle (Saale) 2015, ISBN 978-3-95462-540-6
- 34 – der einfache Schrecken oder die Welt heute … Ein schmaler Roman zwischen Dresden und Wien. Mitteldeutscher Verlag, Halle (Saale) 2017, ISBN 978-3-95462-913-8

== Radio plays ==
- 1984: Die letzten Stunden der Menschheit – director: Otto Brusatti (ORF/WDR)
