= Werner Bodendorff =

German musicologist, oboist, music historian and writer

Werner Bodendorff (born in 1958) is a German oboist, musicologist (with a focus on Franz Schubert, Werner Egk, church music and wind music) as well as a writer.

== Career ==
Bodendorff was born in Radolfzell. After the Abitur, he studied oboe and conducting at the Leopold Mozart Centre as well as musicology, philosophy and history in Augsburg. In 1993 he received his doctorate at the Eberhard-Karls-Universität Tübingen. From 1994 to 2003 he was research assistant to Ernst Hilmar at the International Franz Schubert Institut (IFSI) in Vienna and in the Kommission für Musikforschung, subsequently a scholarship holder of the Austrian Science Fund in Vienna. From 1998 to 2005 he was a lecturer for instrumental instruction at the Werner-Egk-Musikschule in Donauwörth. From winter semester 2000 to summer semester 2004 he simultaneously held a teaching position for music history at the Hochschule für Musik in Augsburg.

Bodendorff is currently working as music critic of the Kieler Nachrichten, freelance publicist and conductor of the Symphony Orchestra in Plön. He is also a freelance reviewer, essayist, author of scientific articles and fiction books, especially on Franz Schubert, Werner Egk and the history of wind music. He is the author of numerous encyclopaedia articles and short biographies, editor of Schubert's and Salieri's church music works at Carus-Verlag and is also active as a musician and arranger.

== Books and editions on Franz Schubert ==
- Werner Bodendorff: Franz Schuberts Frauenbild. January 1996. Augsburg: Wißner-Verlag. ISBN 3-89639-014-7
- Werner Bodendorff: Die kleineren Kirchenwerke Franz Schuberts. Augsburg: Wißner 1997. ISBN 3-89639-089-9
- Werner Bodendorff: Wer war Franz Schubert: Eine Biographie. January 1997. Augsburg: Wißner. ISBN 3-89639-066-X
- Ernst Hilmar (cooperation: W. Bodendorff): Bausteine zu einer neuen Schubert-Bibliographie vornehmlich der Schriften von 1929 bis 2000. Part I: Alphabetische Ordnung nach Autoren. In Schubert durch die Brille No. 25, (2000), pp. 95–303 (supplements and indexes inSchubert durch die Brille No. 26, 27).
- Ernst Hilmar (cooperation: W. Bodendorff): Franz Schubert. Dokumente 1801-1830. First volume. Addenda und Kommentar. (Veröffentlichungen des IFSI, vol. 10, 2), Hans Scneider in Tutzing 2003. ISBN 3-7952-1126-3
- Werner Bodendorff: Franz Schuberts kvindebillede på baggrund af hans Frauenlieder. Roskilde : Franz Schubert Selskabet Danmark, 2004
- Ernst Hilmar (cooperation: W. Bodendorff): Schubert-Enzyklopädie, Hans Schneider in Tützing 2004. ISBN 3-7952-1155-7
- Werner Bodendorff: Franz Schubert – die Texte seiner einstimmig und mehrstimmig komponierten Lieder und ihre Dichter (critical eds, vol. 3), Hildesheim 2006 ISBN 3-487-10330-3
- Schubert, Franz. [Salve regina, D 811] Salve regina. Stuttgart: Carus-Verlag, 2003, Partitur, Neuaufl.
- Schubert, Franz. [Messen, D 950] Messe in Es. Stuttgart: Carus-Verlag, 2004, Partitur, Urtext edition, Neuaufl.

== Books and editions ==
- Werner Bodendorff: Historie der geblasenen Musik. Obermayer, Buchloe 2002. ISBN 3-927781-25-8
- Werner Bodendorff, Herbert Kurz, Werner Egk, Ottmar Seuffert: Der Unbekannte Werner Egk: Beiträge Zum 2. Werner-Egk-Symposium Donauwörth, 17-19 Mai 2001. Verlag der Stadt Donauwörth. January 2007. ISBN 978-3-00-022353-2

== Literary publications ==
- Werner Bodendorff: Schwimmbad-Reigen : aus dem wechselvollen Leben eines Bademeisters im Stadtbergener Bad; Augsburg: Wißner 1996. ISBN 3-89639-038-4
- Werner Bodendorff: Der Zorn des Marsyas (Roman). Würzburg 2009. ISBN 978-3-8260-4127-3
- Werner Bodendorff: Gehör-Gänge Erzählungen. Würzburg 2012. ISBN 978-3-8260-4799-2
