= Nese Erikli =

German politician (born 1981)

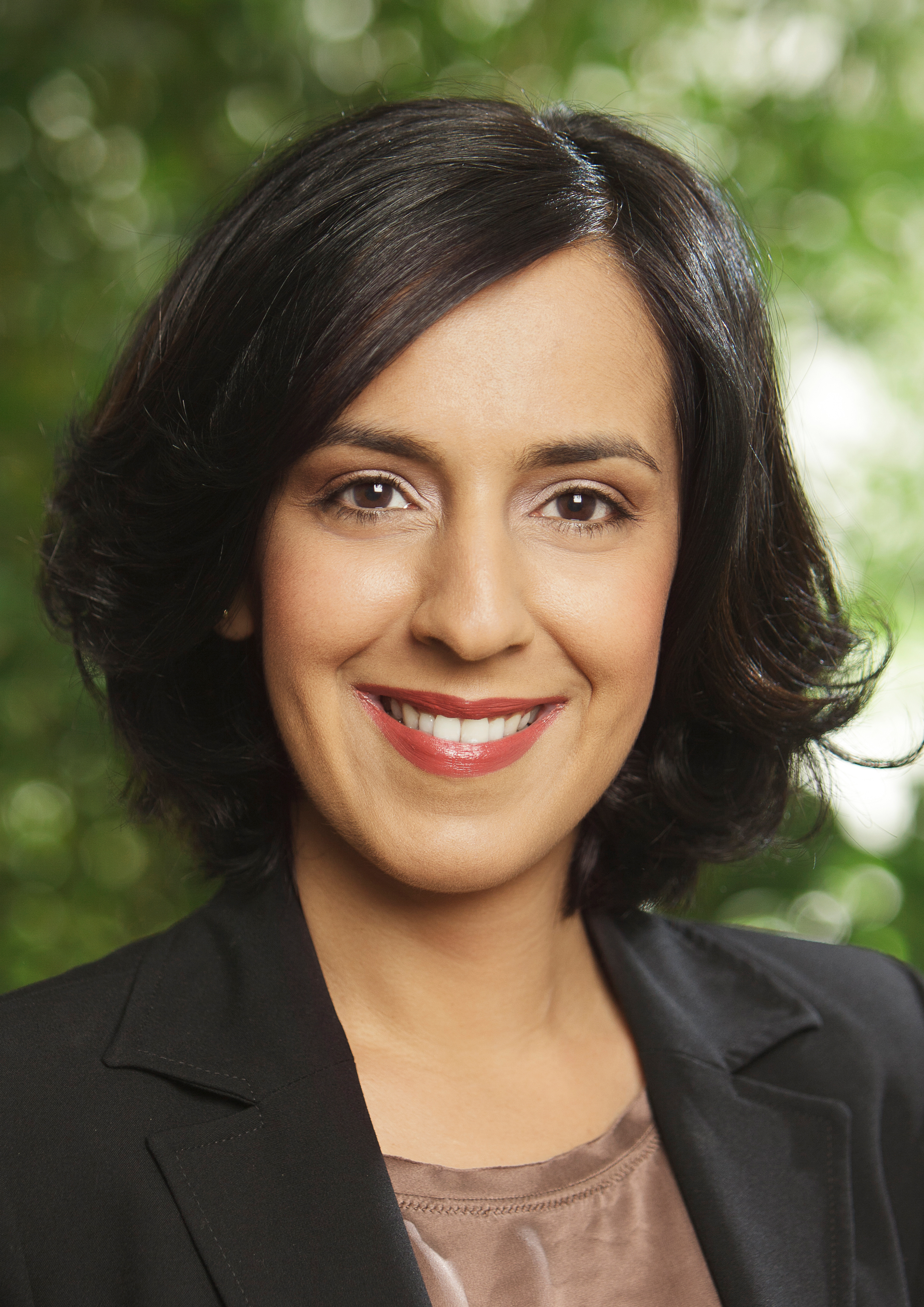
- Erikli in 2013

Member of the Landtag of Baden-Württemberg
- Incumbent
- Assumed office 11 May 2016
- Constituency: Konstanz

Personal details
- Born: 18 July 1981 (age 44)
- Party: Alliance 90/The Greens

Nese Erikli (born 18 July 1981) is a German politician serving as a member of the Landtag of Baden-Württemberg since 2016. She has served as state secretary of science since 2026.
