= Bernina International =

International manufacturer of sewing machines

Bernina International AG
- Bernina logo
- Type: Aktiengesellschaft
- Industry: Sewing and embroidery systems
- Founded: 1893; 133 years ago
- Founder: Fritz Gegauf
- Headquarters: Steckborn (TG), Switzerland
- Area served: Worldwide
- Key people: Hanspeter Ueltschi (owner and chairman of the board of directors); Kai Hillebrandt (CEO)
- Products: Bernina sewing machines Textile machines Software
- Brands: Bernette
- Revenue: CHF249 million (2025)
- Number of employees: 1,291 (annual average in 2025)
- Website: www.bernina.com

Bernina International AG is a privately owned international manufacturer of sewing and embroidery systems. The company was founded in Steckborn, Switzerland, and develops, manufactures, and sells goods and services for the textile market, primarily household sewing-related products in the fields of embroidery, quilting, home textiles, garment sewing, and crafting.

The origins of the company lie in the 1893 invention of the hemstitch sewing machine by Swiss inventor and entrepreneur Karl Friedrich Gegauf. Currently, the company's products include sewing machines, embroidery machines, serger/overlocker machines, and computer software for embroidery design.

== History ==
=== 1890s to 1910s: Karl Friedrich Gegauf and the invention of the hemstitch sewing machine ===
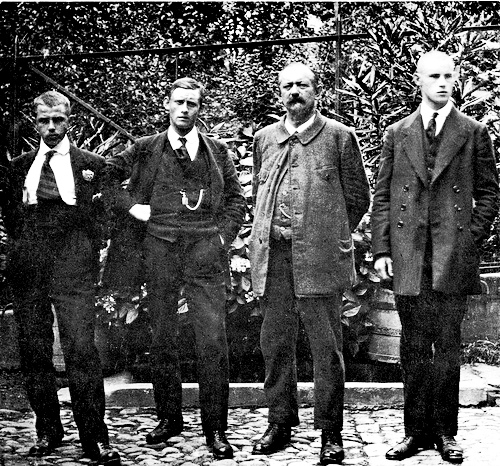
Company founder Karl Friedrich Gegauf and his sons

The present-day Bernina International AG was founded by Karl Friedrich Gegauf (1860–1926), who, at the beginning of his career, decided to pursue an apprenticeship as a mechanic instead of studying medicine. After completing his apprenticeship, he worked in the Baum embroidery machine factory in Rorschach. In 1890, Karl Friedrich Gegauf set up his own business in Steckborn, Switzerland, opening an embroidery and mechanical workshop for the manufacture of his own invention, a monogram embroidery machine. Together with his brother Georg, a salesman, Karl Friedrich ran the Gebrüder Gegauf (Bros. Gegauf) company. Through his involvement in the textile industry, he noticed how laborious it was to produce hemstitching, which until then could only be done manually. Consequently, in 1893, Karl Friedrich Gegauf invented the world's first hemstitch sewing machine, capable of sewing 100 stitches per minute.

1893 is therefore considered the official founding year of Bernina.

In 1895, the Bros. Gegauf workshop was completely destroyed by fire, except for the prototype of the hemstitch sewing machine, which was the only thing that could be rescued. Karl Friedrich built a new workshop in an old barn, where the focus was no longer on embroidery but on the construction of the hemstitch sewing machine. About 70 people were employed in the serial production of the hemstitch sewing machine. The mechanical production of hemstitching, whether as embellishment for handkerchiefs, tablecloths, or bedspreads, was commonly referred to as "gegaufing", because the name Gegauf became well known in the industry.

=== 1920s to 1940s: Fritz Gegauf and the development of the first Bernina household sewing machine ===
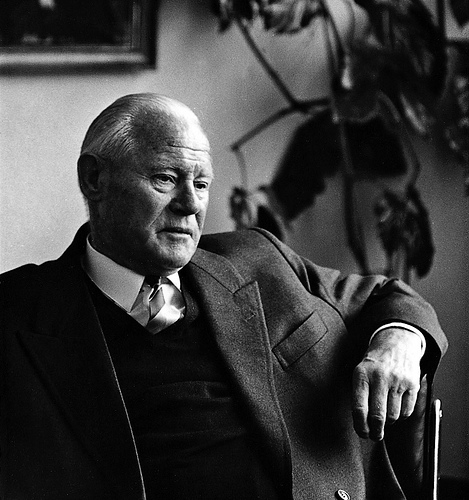
Fritz Gegauf introduced the Bernina brand name in 1932.

In 1919, Fritz Gegauf (1893–1980), one of Karl's sons, together with his father, filed a patent application for the "Wotan" hemstitch sewing machine, which became another international success for the company, which changed its name to "Fritz Gegauf". After being in Paris selling the company's tin openers, which had no market in Switzerland, he returned to his home town. His brother Gustav and he took control of the factory after their father's death in 1926. During the Great Depression, Fritz Gegauf joined forces with the embroidery factory, Brütsch & Sohn in St. Gallen, which was also operating in the red. By the end of 1932, they had developed the company's first household sewing machine, which they named Bernina. The Bernina was soon being produced as furniture-cum-sewing-machine, which required the building of a new, attached furniture factory in Steckborn. As of October 26, 1937, a total of 20,000 machines had left the factory in Steckborn. In 1938, the company introduced the first Bernina zigzag machine, and in 1945, the world's first portable zigzag machine with a free arm on the market. In 1947, Gustav Gegauf left the company. By mid-1963, one million Bernina zigzag sewing machines had been manufactured in Steckborn. Since then, the company has commonly been called Bernina, although, since 1947, its official name has been "Fritz Gegauf Aktiengesellschaft, Bernina Nähmaschinenfabrik".

=== 1950s to 1988: Odette Gegauf-Ueltschi and the fully automatic sewing machine ===
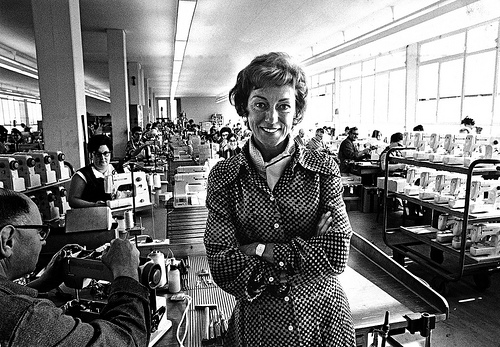
Odette Ueltschi took charge of the company in 1965.

In 1959, Odette Ueltschi (1921–1992), Fritz Gegauf's daughter, became involved in the company, and took over the management of Bernina after the death of her brother in 1965. In 1963, the first Bernina sewing machine with a patented knee-activated presser foot lifter, the 730, appeared on the market. From 1963 onwards, the subsequent model, the 730, was produced, and in the same year, the millionth Bernina sewing machine was manufactured. The top-seller of all the models was the 830 class, which came into production in 1971 and continued until 1981. In 1981, the company took a further step in the development of household sewing machines. The 930 model was the first machine with a stretch-stitch function. It was followed by the 1130, the first fully automated sewing machine, launched in 1986. The enduring mark which Odette Gegauf-Ueltschi left on the company is reflected in the name of the bernette sewing machine line, formed by a combination of the first half of the brand name and the second half of her given name.

=== 1988 to 2007: Hanspeter Ueltschi and the first sewing computer, expansion of markets and production ===
Hanspeter Ueltschi (left), owner and chairman of Bernina, with Kai Hillebrandt, managing director of Bernina, in 2024

Hanspeter Ueltschi took over the management of Fritz Gegauf AG in 1988 from his mother Odette Gegauf-Ueltschi, and currently runs the company as owner and chairman of the board of directors. After studying business administration at the University of St. Gallen, Ueltschi spent seven years gaining professional experience in the USA before getting into the leadership of the family company in Switzerland. Under Ueltschi, the company expanded its leading position in the sewing machine technology sector, reduced manufacturing costs, and advanced product innovations and marketing. The company entered the computer age with the artista 180, Bernina's first sewing computer, and ensured the continuous development and optimization of computer technology in the sewing field, as demonstrated by the successive models of the artista and aurora series. Ueltschi worked towards his stated goal of making sewing more appealing and popular worldwide. With Steckborn as the main site at the time, the company expanded internationally by establishing a plant in Thailand in 1990. Bernina Thailand is owned by Bernina International and is managed locally by a Swiss management team. Ueltschi is also largely responsible for establishing the US as a key market and expansion to the new markets in Eastern Europe, Russia, South America, and India, as well as in the Middle East. He renamed "Fritz Gegauf AG" to "Bernina International AG" to accommodate the trend toward globalization and the success of the company brand.

=== 2008 to present ===
Under the leadership of CEO Claude Dreyer (2008 to 2020), Bernina diversified into longarm quilting machines, multi-needle embroidery machines (Melco), and launched several sewing machine series with the new Bernina hook system. In 2020, the L 850 and L 890, two overlockers with an air threader developed at the Swiss headquarters, were launched. Since 2021, the company has been under the operational management of CEO Kai Hillebrandt, while Hanspeter Ueltschi is chairman of the board of directors. His children Katharina and Philipp Ueltschi have joined the executive board.

In 2024, the company launched the “Bernina 990” sewing and embroidery machine. The machine, which was under development from 2017, features a scanner, camera, touchscreen, and laser, among other things. The equipment enables precise placement of embroidery designs, as the hooped fabric can be visualized in the embroidery hoop.

== Company structure ==
The Bernina Textile Group is a globally active group of 15 companies doing business in 80 countries. The company manufactures products such as household sewing and embroidery machines, household overlocker machines, longarm quilting machines, multineedle embroidery machines, accessories (presser foot, embroidery hoops and other accessories for sewing, quilting and overlocking), and computer software for embroidery design. In 2025, Bernina recorded sales of around CHF249 million.

At the headquarters in Steckborn, the departments for development, product management, quality management, marketing, and central administrative functions are located. Production is based in Lamphun in Thailand, and the logistics center in Appenweier, Germany.

Subsidiaries are established in Australia, Austria, Belgium, Germany, the Netherlands, New Zealand, Switzerland, and the United States. The subsidiary Benartex, headquartered in the United States, sells printed textiles and quilting fabrics in particular. OESD, another subsidiary, develops and sells embroidery designs. The subsidiary Brewer, engaging in the sewing supplies market, offers sewing and crafting notions, patterns, books etc. Another subsidiary, Melco Embroidery Systems, manufactures single-head and multi-head embroidery machines as well as embroidery software.

With "Bernette", the company has a second brand that is aimed at a younger target group and beginners with lower prices and simple operation. The name Bernette was created by combining the company name Bernina with the first name of the former owner Odette Gegauf-Ueltschi.

== Models ==
=== Timeline ===
Year	1932	1938	1945	1954	1963	1971	1982	1986	1989	1993	1998	2001	2002	2004	2006	2007	2008	2009	2010	2011	2012	2014	2018	2020	2024
Models	Model 105
Models		Model 117
Models			Model 125
Models				Model 530
Models					Model 730
Models						Model 830
Models							Model 930
Models								Model 1130
Models									Model 1230/1260
Models										Model 1630
Models											artista 180
Models												activa 145
Models													artista 200
Models														QE
Models															Artista 640 Aurora 440 QE Artista 730
Models																	Bernina 8 Series
Models																			Bernina 5 Series
Models																				Bernina 7 Series
Models																					Bernina longarm quilting machines
Models																						Bernina 4 Series
Models																						Bernina L 8 Series overlocker
Models																						Bernina 990

=== Mechanical ===
These machines have fully mechanical controls and internal drive train and from model 125 were electrically driven with an external motor. Starting from the 500 series the 'x30' was the top model in each subsequent range, offering a larger number of stitches and from the 700 series incorporating a knee operated presser foot lifter. These early machines all have a cast metal enamelled body, simple controls and produce accurate stitches in a range of fabrics, epitomised by the long running '830 Record' launched in 1971, offering 21 practical and decorative stitches and weighing over 9 kg (without case) popular with keen sewists, educational establishments and costume departments

The model ranges also included smaller and slightly lighter '3/4' sized portable machines with similar build quality intended for sewing class or domestic use, typically offering 7 practical stitches (e.g. 707/717 minimatic). The portable machines incorporating a transport handle from the 800 series were designated 'Sport' to distinguish them from similarly numbered models intended for static use. The 900 series, introduced a new squarer metal body and an integrated motor housing. The 950 Industrial was a long running flat bed model for professional use. The 1000 series with its increased 5.5mm stitch width, was the final mechanical model range and the mid-range 1008 model with 16 practical and decorative stitches remained in production until 2020. The high build quality, simplicity and durability of these Swiss built electro-mechanical models of all eras mean they remain popular on the used market and will give a lifetime of service with regular maintenance.

Mechanical models from the 530 to the 1000 series (and early computerised models to the 1630) use the Bernina 'CB' hook and take either the vintage engraved number two-pronged presser feet (4.5mm stitch width models) or the later type 'A' two-pronged presser feet (4.5 & 5.5mm stitch width models).

Construction	Series	Note	Image
1932–1945	Model 105	First household sewing machine bearing the Bernina brand name. Manual sewing machine manufactured by Fritz Gegauf.	
1938–1945	Model 117	First Bernina zigzag sewing machine	
1945–1963	Model 125	First electrically driven Bernina free-arm zigzag sewing machine. Marketed as the first free arm portable sewing machine in the world.	
1954–1963	Model 530 Record	First Bernina with patented snap-on presser foot and semi-automatic buttonhole-sewing function. 12 practical and decorative stitches.	
Mid 50s to 1960s	Model 600	The 600 series (600, 610, 640, 642, 644) was introduced to provide a lower cost lighter weight model to complement the newly introduced 500 series and replacing the older model 125.	
1963–1982	Model 730	The 730 model, with patented knee-activated presser-foot lifter	
1971–1982	Model 830	First Bernina with electronic foot control—the top-of-the-range model for 11 years	
1982–1989	Model 930	First Bernina with stretch-stitch function and an especially powerful motor	
1999 –2020	Model 1008	Mid-range Electro-mechanical model. Metal body.	

== Computerised ==
These computerised machines replace mechanical controls with push buttons and (later) LCD screen user interface for adjusting settings. The machines are built on a metal chassis with plastic outer casing. Manufacture of the simpler models is undertaken in Berninas factory in Thailand, whilst the top end ranges in each generation are still assembled in Switzerland.

Construction	Series	Note	Image
1986–1989	Model 1130	First computerized Bernina with fully automatic one-step buttonholes and stitch memory	
1989–1998	Model 1230	Model with expanded memory capacity and fully automatic one-step buttonholes, including eyelet buttonholes	
1993–1998	Model 1630	Top model: 9mm stitch width, over 400 stitch patterns, monograms, five alphabets, sewing in 16 directions possible	
1998–2002	Artista 165,180	Top model with customized pattern selection software for customer-specific settings, optional embroidery module, conversion of scanned templates to embroidery designs	
2001–2002	Activa 145	Simple compact sewing machine: Computerized; individually adjustable memory for stitch patterns, buttonhole repeat, stitch library, patchwork presser foot	
2002–2006	Artista 200	World's first sewing and embroidery computer: Microsoft Windows operating system, CD-ROM drive, LCD, more than 850 stitches, programmable function key, memory function for stitch combinations and embroidery designs	
2004–2006	440QE	World's first sewing computer with Bernina Stitch Regulator system for consistent stitch lengths at variable sewing speeds, especially for quilters	
2004	Artista 640	Advanced sewing computer: Extensive utility and decorative stitch programs, optional embroidery module with built-in embroidery software and optional BSR system	
2006	Artista 730	High-end sewing and embroidery system: Utility and decorative stitches, embroidery designs, many automatic settings such as thread cutter, touchscreen, BSR system, CFL light. Optional embroidery module.	
2008	Model B830	World's biggest and fastest sewing and embroidery system for home users: 1100 sewing stitches/min, 1000 embroidery stitches/min, extra-large bobbin (40% more capacity than before), fully automatic needle threader, 360° multidirectional sewing, 7-inch TFT screen, especially bright working area (30 LED lamps), more than 1000 stitch patterns, 150 pre-installed embroidery motifs by international designers	
2009	Model B820	Similar to the B830, but without embroidery functionality (not upgradable) or sideways feed (multidirectional sewing), and with a smaller screen and fewer stitch patterns	
2011	Model 580	Sewing and embroidery machine, top model of the Bernina 5 series: 227 stitches, of which 186 decorative stitches, optional embroidery module, large TFT touch screen, memory function, embroidery function integrated and 100 embroidery motifs	
2012	Model 780	Sewing and embroidery machine with Bernina dual transport, Bernina 9 gripper, large embroidery module, BSR, 1306 stitches, 130 integrated embroidery patterns, including sewing consultant and tutorial, top model of the Bernina-7 series	
2014	Model Q 24	First Bernina long-arm quilting machine with 24-inch free arm, stitch regulation via integrated BSR sensors, 2.200 stitches per minute, designed for use on a quilt frame of 3,55x1,2 m (length x width), installation at the parent plant in Steckborn, until now, Bernina has only been producing household sewing machines with the Q 24 model and the smaller Q 20 to a new, semiprofessional customer segment, the so-called prosumer. For the long-arm quilting machines, a new assembly line was set up in the Steckborn headquarters.	
2015	Model 790	Further development of the B 780 with new gripper (in the sister model B 720 for the first time also available with 5.5mm stitch width), adaptive thread tension, embroidery module, embroidery designer and BERNINA stitch regulator.	
2018	Series 4	Bernina launches the 4 Series. The compact sewing machine models are equipped with the Bernina hook.	
2020	L 850 and L 890	With the Bernina L 850 and L 890, Bernina launches two overlockers with air threader, completely developed in Switzerland. The most important feature is the Bernina One-Step air threader: with a brief press of the foot pedal, the thread is guided through the machine by air, and the looper automatically moves to the correct position.	
2024	Model 990	Sewing, embroidery and quilting machine equipped with scanner, camera, touch screen and laser for placing motifs. Space to the right of the needle of 356 mm, maximum sewing speed of 1200 stitches per minute, embroidery hoop with a size of 410 × 305 mm (length x width).	
2025	Series 3	Bernina launches the B 335 and B 325 models. The machines receive the iF Design Award and the German Design Award.	
2026	L 6 Series	Bernina expands its overlocker model range with the Bernina L 660, L 650, and L 620.	

== Presser feet ==
Bernina is noted for producing an extensive range of presser feet for its machines to suit a wide variety of uses and materials. Older machines are still supported and in particular the type A feet are still in manufacture and are compatible for models back to the 1950s 530 Record. Three new height adjustable feet were added to the type A range in 2020

Feet designation	Hook type	Feet types	Description	Compatibility	Production
Vintage	CB		Two pronged feet with engraved numbers	4.5mm machines (530 to 900 series)	Replaced by 'A' type
A	CB	45	Two pronged feet with black number on white label	4.5mm machines (530 to 900 series) and 5.5mm machines (1000 series to 1630)	Available new

== Embroidery software ==
Bernina developed embroidery design editing and full digitizing software branded under its own name and written by industrial digitizing software manufacturer Wilcom International Pty Ltd.

== See also ==
- List of sewing machine brands
- Sewing machine
- Machine embroidery
