= Fritz Gegauf =

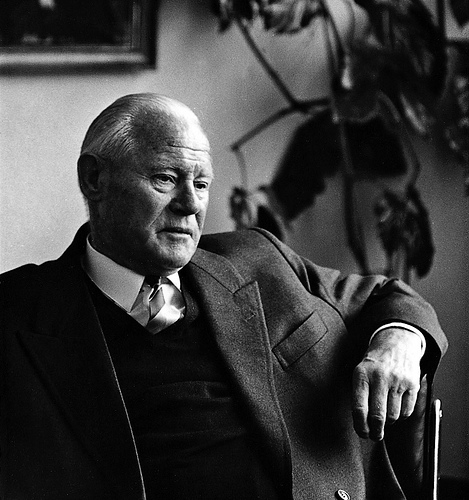
Fritz Gegauf

Fritz Gegauf (1893-1980) was a Swiss inventor and founder of the Bernina International, an international manufacturer of sewing and embroidery systems. He was the son of Karl Friedrich Gegauf (1860-1926), inventor of the hemstitch sewing machine.

== Biography ==
Fritz Gegauf was born on 5 April 1893 at Steckborn, Switzerland. From 1910 until 1914, he made a mechanics apprenticeship in his fathers sewing machine factory at Steckborn. He was awarded a patent for a hemstitch sewing machine. In 1920 he married Hermine Meienhofer, daughter of the baker Hermann Meienhofer. From then until 1923 he worked for the sewing machine factory Athos in Paris. After the death of his father in 1926 he ran the family business together with his brother Gustav as Fritz Gegauf's Söhne. The factory and its 35 employees moved to newly built premises in 1929. When sales of the industrial hemstitch sewing machines dropped in the early 1930s, he formed in 1932—in cooperation with Wilhelm Brütsch—the Bernina Sewing Machine Factory which produced sewing machines for the home. Technical innovations brought about the rapid growth of the company in the post-war years. Until 1975 Gegauf was on the board of directors, becoming honorary president thereafter.

Fritz Gegauf died on 24 February 1980 in Steckborn.
