= Museum Haus Dix =

House museum in Hemmenhofen

Coordinates: 47°40′22″N 8°57′41″E

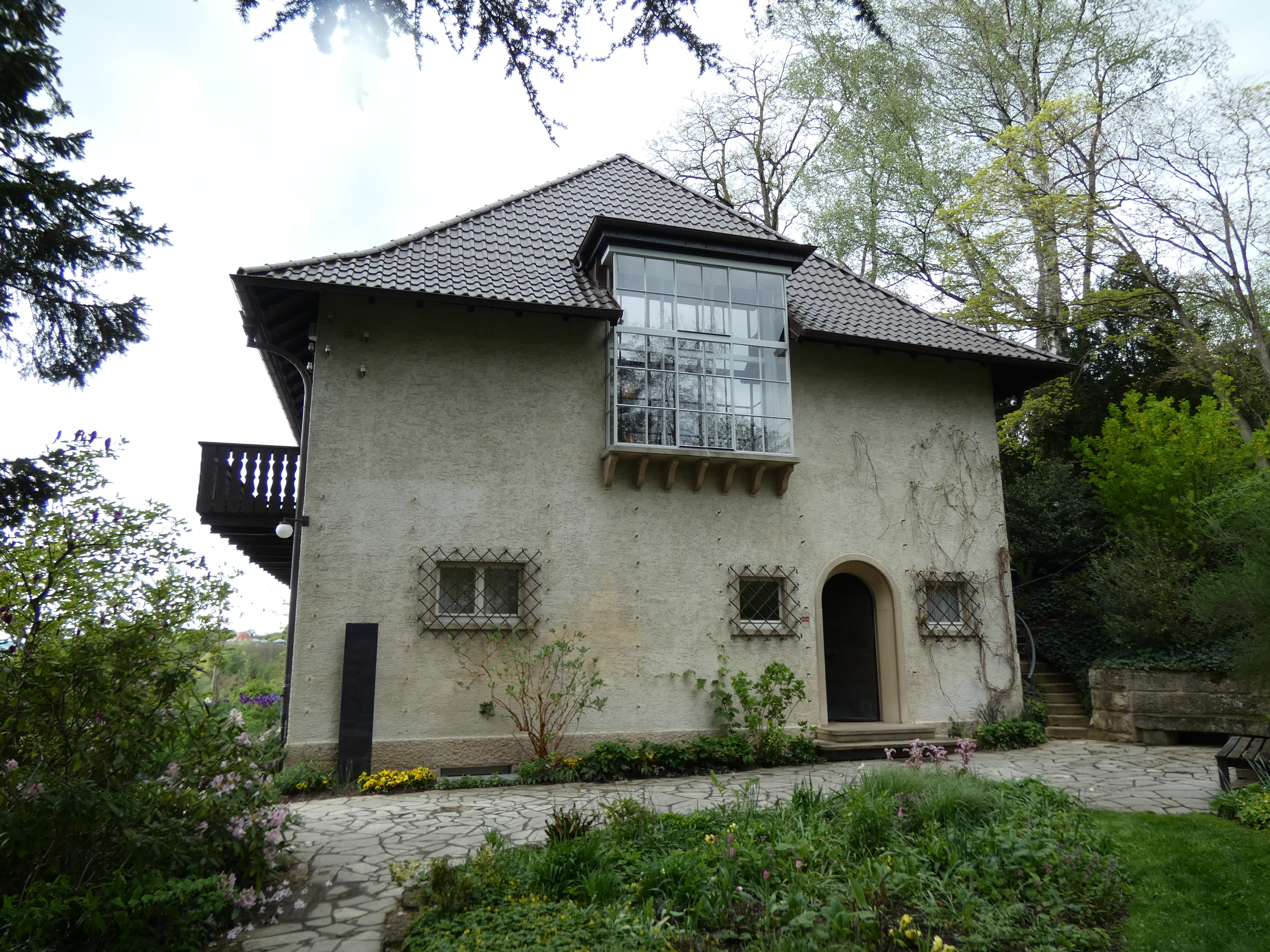
View of the Museum Haus Dix

The Museum Haus Dix or House Museum Dix is the former studio and home of the German painter Otto Dix in Hemmenhofen, a district of the municipality of Gaienhofen, and also an establishment of the Kunstmuseum Stuttgart.

== Residential building ==
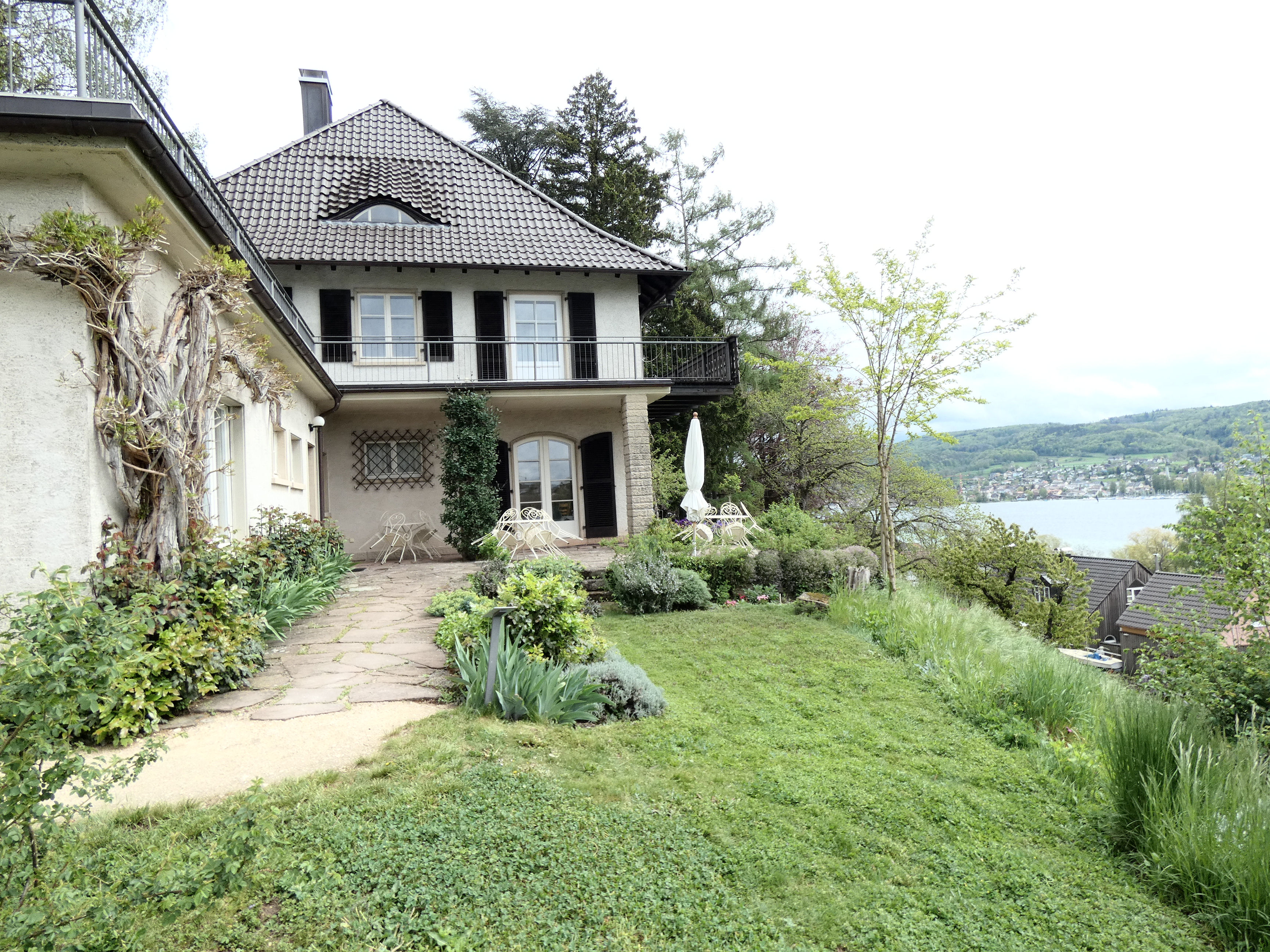
View of the Museum Haus Dix, with the terrace and the garden

After Otto Dix lost his chair at the Dresden Art Academy in 1933, he and his family initially found accommodation in Randegg Castle until 1936. Thanks to an inheritance, Martha Dix, Otto Dix's wife, was able to purchase a plot of land on a hill on the Untersee, the east part of the Lake Constance, in the Höri peninsula in Hemmenhofen, to build a house there. The house was designed according to plans by the Dresden architect Arnulf Schelcher. In 1936 the family moved into their new home opposite the Swiss bank.

The studio windows on the east side, the surrounding balcony and numerous windows with a view of the lake are characteristic of the generously designed three-storey house with almost 400 m^{2} of floor space. The kitchen, dining and living rooms as well as the music room are on the ground floor. The first floor was chosen for Otto Dix's studio and Martha Dix's salon; for the rooms of the children Nelly (1923–1955), Ursus (1927–2002) and Jan Dix (1928–2019) the second floor. Otto Dix lived and worked here until his death, in 1969, and increasingly devoted his work to the landscape of the Lake Constance. Martha Dix stayed until 1979 before moving to the south of France to live with her granddaughter Bettina until her death in 1985.

Two years before her death, the widow handed over the house in Hemmenhofen, which belonged to her all her life, and the rights to her husband's estate, to the Otto Dix Foundation, which was founded in 1983, and whose partners were her two sons and granddaughter Bettina Dix-Pfefferkorn.

The house and garden were registered in the Baden-Württemberg monuments book in 2005.

== Museum ==
The museum was redesigned by the Kunstmuseum Stuttgart and funded by the Otto-Dix-Haus-Stiftung, refurbished in accordance with listed buildings and equipped as a museum. In 2013 the association handed over the house to the Kunstmuseum Stuttgart, which now owns one of the most important Dix collections. In June 2013 it reopened as the Museum Haus Dix, a branch of the Kunstmuseum Stuttgart.

The focus of the permanent exhibition is the family life of the artist household. Paintings and graphics by Otto Dix are shown in annually changing exhibitions. Images on the walls refer to the works that once hung in the house and can now be found in various museums and collections around the world. The cellar of the house can be visited during guided tours, the walls of which were painted by Otto Dix and some of his guests at a carnival festival in 1966. A media guide leads through the individual rooms and provides information on works of art and the family life of the Dix family. An eight hectare garden with terraces and a museum café complete the ensemble.

== See also ==
- List of single-artist museums
