= Ernst Hilmar =

Austrian librarian, editor, and musicologist (1938–2016)

- Born: 20 September 1938; Graz, Austria
- Died: 23 November 2016 (aged 78); Villach, Austria
- Education: PhD University of Graz
- Occupation: Musicologist
- Writing career
- Subject: Music
- Notable works: Schubert-Enzyklopädie 2004, Hugo Wolf Enzyklopädie 2007

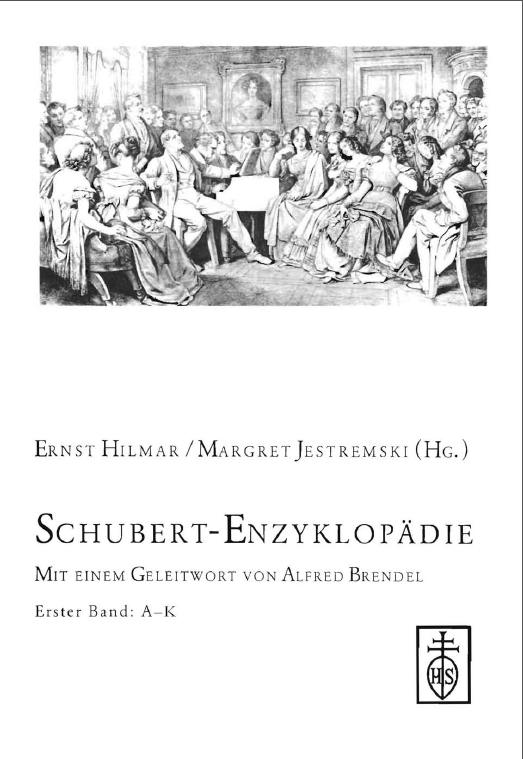
Schubert-Enzyklopädie

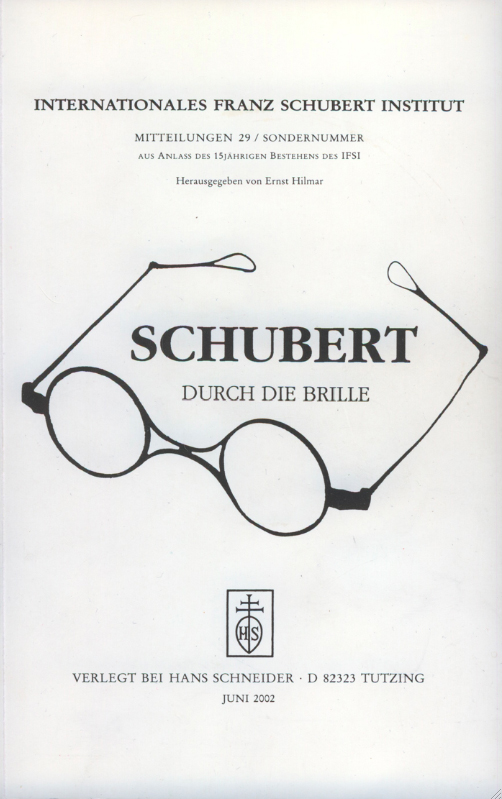
Schubert durch die Brille 29

Ernst Hilmar (20 September 1938 – 23 November 2016) was an Austrian librarian, editor, and musicologist.

== Biography ==
Hilmar was born in Graz and studied musicology at the University of Graz and the University of Music and Performing Arts in Vienna.

From 1975 to 1994, he was head of the music division of the Vienna City and State Library. Owing to various shady events in connection with holdings that had disappeared from this collection, Hilmar was forced to retire from this position in 1994.

Since 1987, he was also head of the Internationales Franz-Schubert-Institut (IFSI) in Vienna and editor of the scholarly journal Schubert durch die Brille (1988–2003), "tirelessly edited since its inception by Ernst Hilmar, […] quickly became the leading arena for the dissemination of Schubert research, news, and events." (Music & Letters, 2002) Due to several violations of the society's regulations he was removed from his position in 2001 and only continued to work as editor of the IFSI's journal. In 2005 Hilmar's successors had to disband the IFSI, because the publisher of Schubert durch die Brille (Hans Schneider) demanded the debts to be paid back that Hilmar had amassed during his activity as editor.

Hilmar's publications include books on Franz Schubert, Hugo Wolf, Johann Strauss, Second Viennese School and many contributions to symposia and dictionaries.

He died in Villach.

== Works ==
=== Franz Schubert ===
- Verzeichnis der Schubert-Handschriften in der Musiksammlung der Wiener Stadt- und Landesbibliothek. Kassel 1978. XV, 144, 105 S.
- Franz Schubert. [Ausstellung […] zum 150. Todestag des Komponisten, ed. with Otto Brusatti. Vienna 1978. – XXXII, 315 S.
- "La Collection schubertienne de la bibliothèque municipale de Vienne," in Franz Schubert et la symphonie, directed by Paul-Gilbert Langevin, la Revue Musicale, Paris, 1981.
- Franz Schubert in seiner Zeit. Wien/Graz 1985. 143 S.
- Franz Schubert: Drei große Sonaten für das Pianoforte: D 958, D 959 u. D 960 (frühe Fassungen); Faksimile nach den Autographen […]. Begl. Text u. Komm. v. E. Hilmar. Erstveröffentl. Tutzing 1987. 28 S.
- Gesammelte Studien zu Leben und Werk von Franz Schubert. Habilitationsschr. Universität Wien 1987. 478 Bl.
- Franz Schubert: Der Graf von Gleichen: Oper in 2 Akten D (918); Erstveröffentlichung der Handschrift des Komponisten aus dem Besitz der Wiener Stadt-und Landesbibliothek. Text von Eduard von Bauernfeld. Hrsg. u. kommentiert von Ernst Hilmar. Mit einem Beitrag von Erich W. Partsch. Tutzing 1988. 19 S., 72 Bl.
- Schubert (Bildbiographie). Graz ADEVA 1989 u. 1996. 216 S.
- Franz Schubert dargestellt von Ernst Hilmar. Reinbek 1997. 158 S.
- Schubert-Lexikon, ed. with Margret Jestremski. Graz: ADEVA 1997. 534 S.
- "Bausteine zu einer neuen Schubert-Bibliographie vornehmlich der Schriften von 1929 bis 2000. Teil I: Alphabetische Ordnung nach Autoren," in Schubert durch die Brille Nr. 25, (2000), S. 95–303 (Ergänzungen und Indizes in Schubert durch die Brille Nrn. 26, 27, Mitarbeit: Werner Bodendorff).
- Franz Schubert. Dokumente 1801–1830. Erster Band. Addenda und Kommentar. Mitarbeit: Werner Bodendorff (Veröffentlichungen des IFSI, 10/2), Tutzing 2003.
- Schubert-Enzyklopädie (2 vols., hrsg. mit Margret Jestremski. Tutzing 2004.

=== Hugo Wolf ===
- Hugo Wolf, Briefe an Frieda Zerny. Wien 1978. 83 S.
- Hugo Wolf Enzyklopädie. 518 Einzelartikel zu Leben und Werk, Umfeld und Rezeption. Tutzing 2007. XXV, 593 S.

=== Wiener Schule ===
- Arnold Schönberg. Gedenkausstellung, Wien 1974. 386 S.
- Wozzeck von Alban Berg. Entstehung, erste Erfolge, Repressionen (1914–1935). Wien 1975. 106 S.
- Dank an Ernst Krenek: Katalog zur Ausstellung der Wiener Stadt- und Landesbibliothek im Historischen Museum der Stadt Wien, Mai – Juni 1982. Wien 1982. 100 S.
- Anton Webern: 1883 – 1983; eine Festschrift zum hundertsten Geburtstag. Mit einer Einleitung von Henri Pousseur. Wien 1983. 296 S.
- Begegnung mit Arnold Schönberg: Internationales Musikfestival Duisburg "Arnold Schönberg und neue Musik aus Deutschland, Österreich und der Schweiz" vom 13. September 1992 bis 30 Juni 1993; Ausstellung im Kultur- und Stadthistorischen Museum Duisburg, 24. Februar bis 28. März 1993. Katalog von Margret Jestremski und Ernst Hilmar. Duisburg 1993. 102 S.

=== Other subjects ===
- Die Nestroy-Vertonungen in den Wiener Sammlungen. In: Maske und Kothurn 18 (1972) 1–2, S. 38–98.
- 75 Jahre Universal-Edition (1901–1976). [Katalog zur Ausstellung der Wiener Stadt- und Landesbibliothek im Historischen Museum der Stadt Wien Dezember 1976 / Jänner 1977] [Mitarbeit: Otto Brusatti]. Wien 1976. 102 S.
- Richard Wagner: "Schusterlied" aus der Oper "Die Meistersinger von Nürnberg": früheste Reinschrift (WWV deest); Faks. nach dem Autograph. Tutzing 1988. 20 S.
- Musiker-Karikaturen von Mahler bis zur Gegenwart. (Wiener Rathaus März 1988-September 1988) Hrsg. Franz Patzer. Katalogred. E. Hilmar. Wien 1987. 61 S.
- Leoš Janáček: Briefe an die Universal Edition. Tutzing 1988. 385 S.
- Internationales Symposium Musikerautographe: Bericht 5.-8. Juni 1989, Wien. Tutzing 1990. 236 S.
- 40.000 Musikerbriefe auf Knopfdruck: Methoden der Verschlagwortung anhand des UE-Briefwechsels – Untersuchungen – Detailergebnisse. Tützing 1989. 168 S.
