= Steckborn =

- Municipality
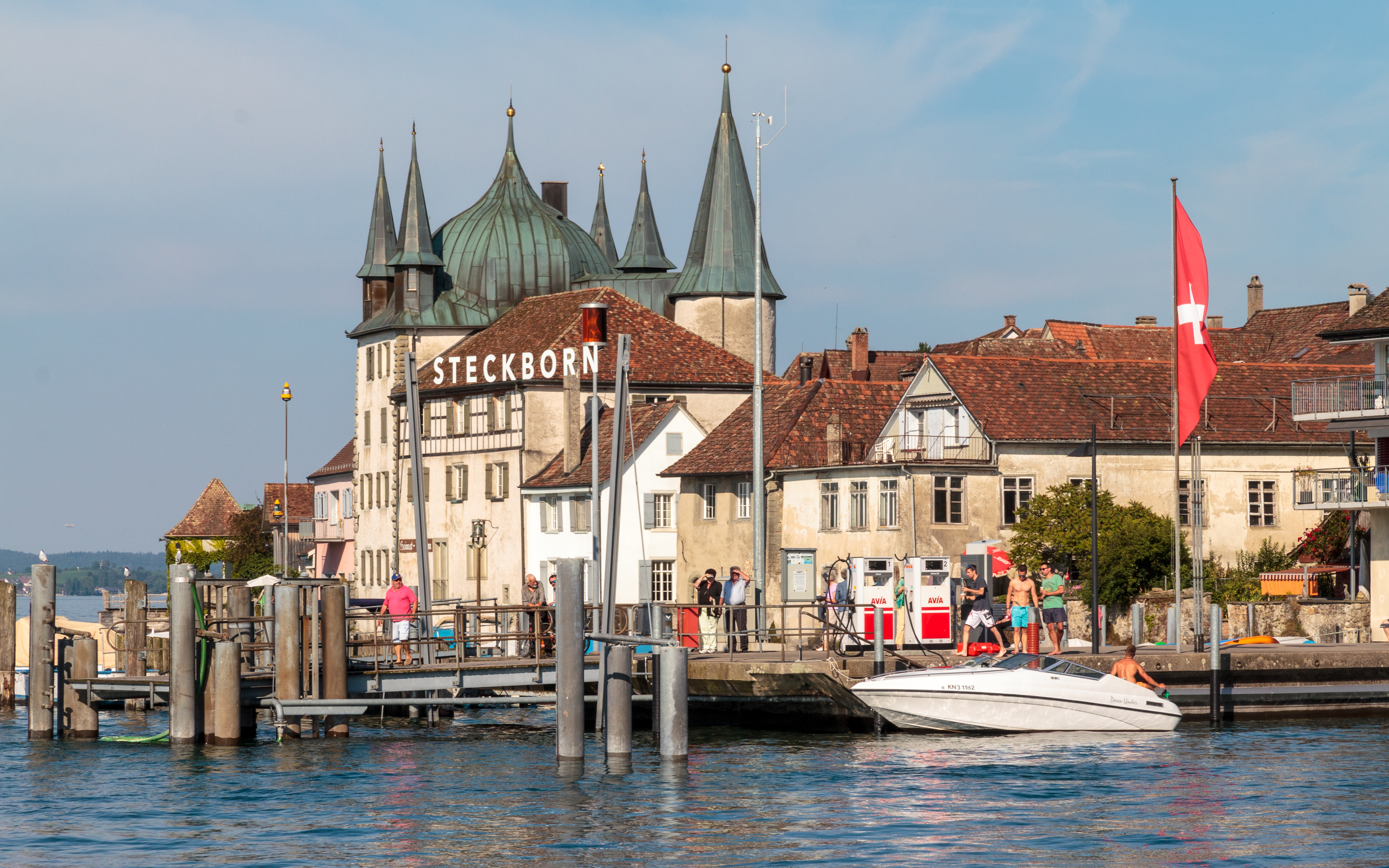

- Coat of arms
- Location of Steckborn
- Location within Switzerland Location within Canton of Thurgau
- Coordinates: 47°40′N 8°59′E
- Country: Switzerland
- Canton: Thurgau
- District: Frauenfeld

Area
  - Total: 8.76 km^{2} (3.38 sq mi)
- Elevation: 400 m (1,300 ft)

Population (December 2007)
  - Total: 3,435
  - Density: 392/km^{2} (1,020/sq mi)
- Time zone: UTC+01:00 (CET)
  - Summer (DST): UTC+02:00 (CEST)
- Postal code: 8266
- SFOS number: 4864
- ISO 3166 code: CH-TG
- Surrounded by: Berlingen, Gaienhofen (Germany), Homburg, Mammern, Öhningen (Germany), Raperswilen
- Website: steckborn.ch

Steckborn is a municipality in Frauenfeld District in the canton of Thurgau in Switzerland.

It is located on the south-western arm of Lake Constance known in German as the Untersee ("Lower Lake").

== History ==
Aerial view by Walter Mittelholzer (1919)

The area around Steckborn was already inhabited in the second century. There are also Roman remains of walls and fortifications. It is thought that the village became part of the territory of the monastery of Reichenau in the ninth century. This is the period when it is first documented.

In 1313 Steckborn was first granted municipal rights. Because all ecclesiastical authority ended with the French invasion in 1798, the dominance of Reichenau also ended. Steckborn has been the district capital of its district since the founding of the canton of Thurgau in 1803.

When a new tower was to be built for the church in 1833, a 17-year-old first-year apprentice, Ferdinand Stadler, was given the chance to draw up the plans. In 1848 the Cistercian convent at Feldbach was closed.

In 1890 an embroidery workshop was established in the buildings of the Feldbach convent. This was to grow into the Bernina Sewing Machine Factory, now known as BERNINA International.

== Geography ==
Steckborn has an area, as of 2009, of 8.76 square kilometers (3.38 sq mi). Of this area, 3.16 km^{2} (1.22 sq mi) or 36.1% is used for agricultural purposes, while 4.07 km^{2} (1.57 sq mi) or 46.5% is forested. Of the rest of the land, 1.52 km^{2} (0.59 sq mi) or 17.4% is settled (buildings or roads), 0.02 km^{2} (4.9 acres) or 0.2% is either rivers or lakes.

Of the built up area, industrial buildings made up 9.4% of the total area while housing and buildings made up 0.9% and transportation infrastructure made up 0.3%. Power and water infrastructure as well as other special developed areas made up 1.6% of the area while parks, green belts and sports fields made up 5.1%. Out of the forested land, 44.7% of the total land area is heavily forested and 1.7% is covered with orchards or small clusters of trees. Of the agricultural land, 33.0% is used for growing crops, while 3.1% is used for orchards or vine crops. All the water in the municipality is flowing water.

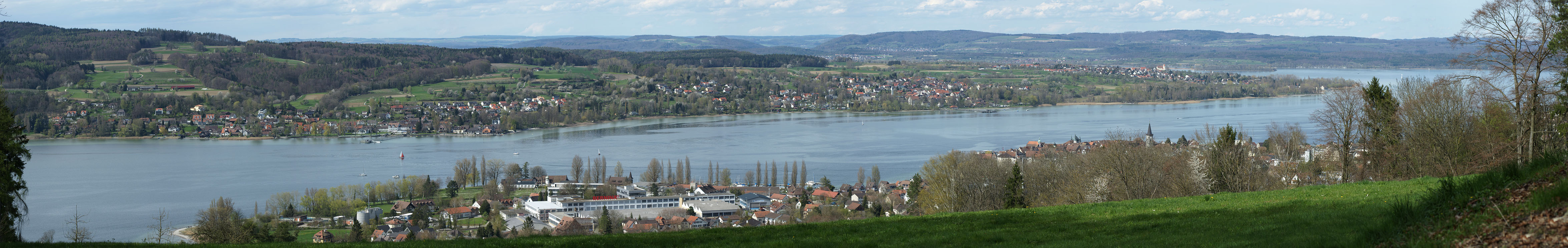
Steckborn, seen from the rest/picnic area Eichhölzli on the hill behind the town. Across the waters of Lake Constance, here known as the Untersee, lies the German shore.

== Demographics ==
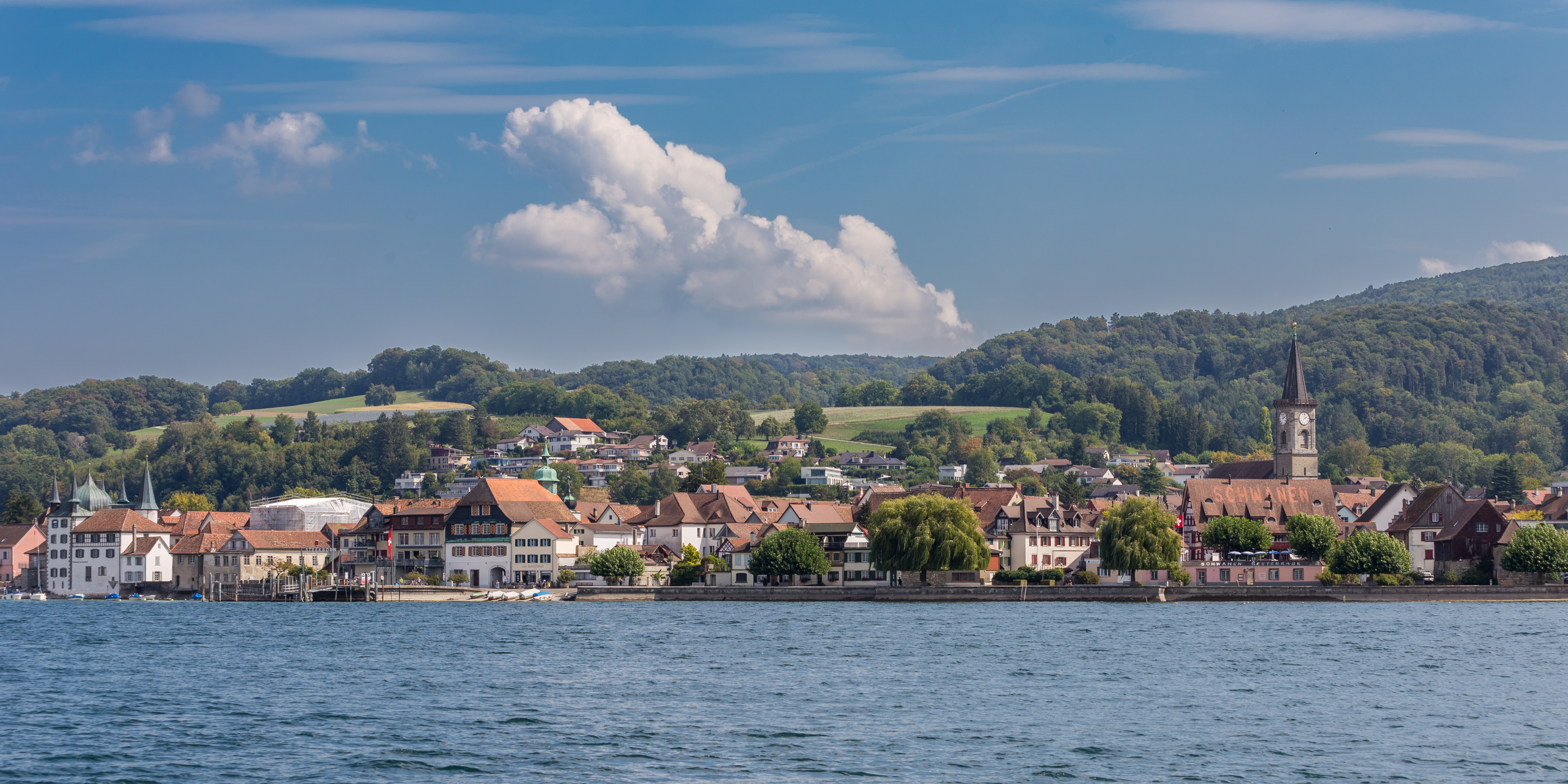
Skyline of Steckborn at Lake Constance

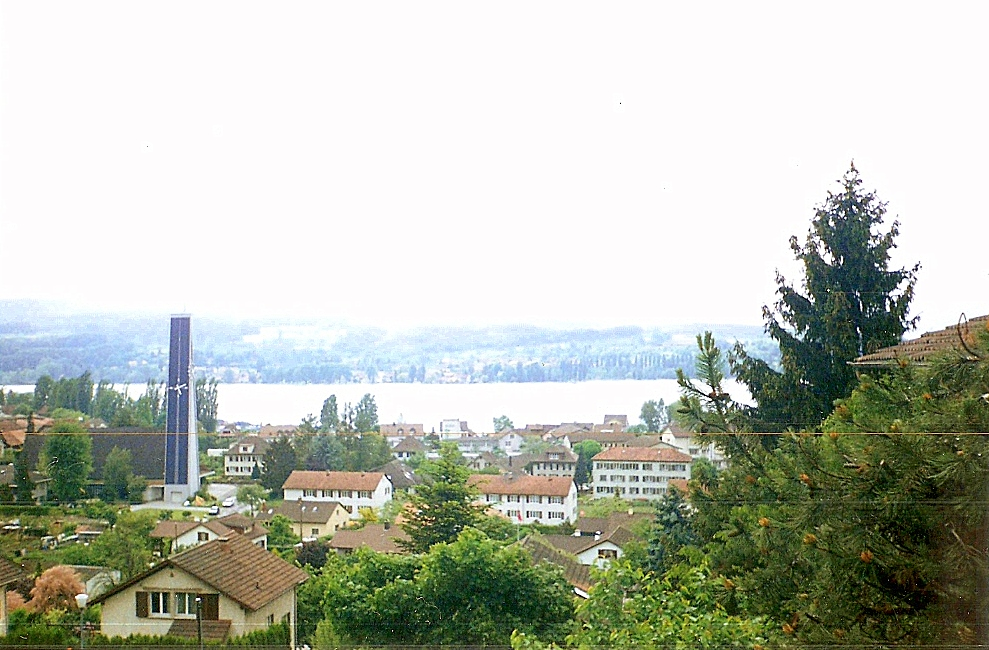
Steckborn village in 1999

Steckborn has a population (as of December 2020) of 3,840. As of 2008, 22.3% of the population are foreign nationals. Over the last 10 years (1997–2007) the population has remained the same. Most of the population (as of 2000) speaks German (87.4%), with Italian being second most common ( 4.6%) and Albanian being third ( 1.9%).

As of 2008, the gender distribution of the population was 50.3% male and 49.7% female. The population was made up of 1,292 Swiss men (37.5% of the population), and 441 (12.8%) non-Swiss men. There were 1,382 Swiss women (40.2%), and 327 (9.5%) non-Swiss women. In 2008 there were 23 live births to Swiss citizens and 6 births to non-Swiss citizens, and in same time span there were 42 deaths of Swiss citizens and 1 non-Swiss citizen death. Ignoring immigration and emigration, the population of Swiss citizens decreased by 19 while the foreign population increased by 5. There were 3 Swiss men who emigrated from Switzerland to another country, 7 Swiss women who emigrated from Switzerland to another country, 50 non-Swiss men who emigrated from Switzerland to another country and 16 non-Swiss women who emigrated from Switzerland to another country. The total Swiss population change in 2008 (from all sources) was an increase of 2 and the non-Swiss population change was an increase of 51 people. This represents a population growth rate of 1.6%.

The age distribution, as of 2009, in Steckborn is; 306 children or 8.8% of the population are between 0 and 9 years old and 411 teenagers or 11.9% are between 10 and 19. Of the adult population, 390 people or 11.3% of the population are between 20 and 29 years old. 334 people or 9.7% are between 30 and 39, 612 people or 17.7% are between 40 and 49, and 532 people or 15.4% are between 50 and 59. The senior population distribution is 407 people or 11.8% of the population are between 60 and 69 years old, 265 people or 7.7% are between 70 and 79, there are 181 people or 5.2% who are between 80 and 89, and there are 23 people or 0.7% who are 90 and older.

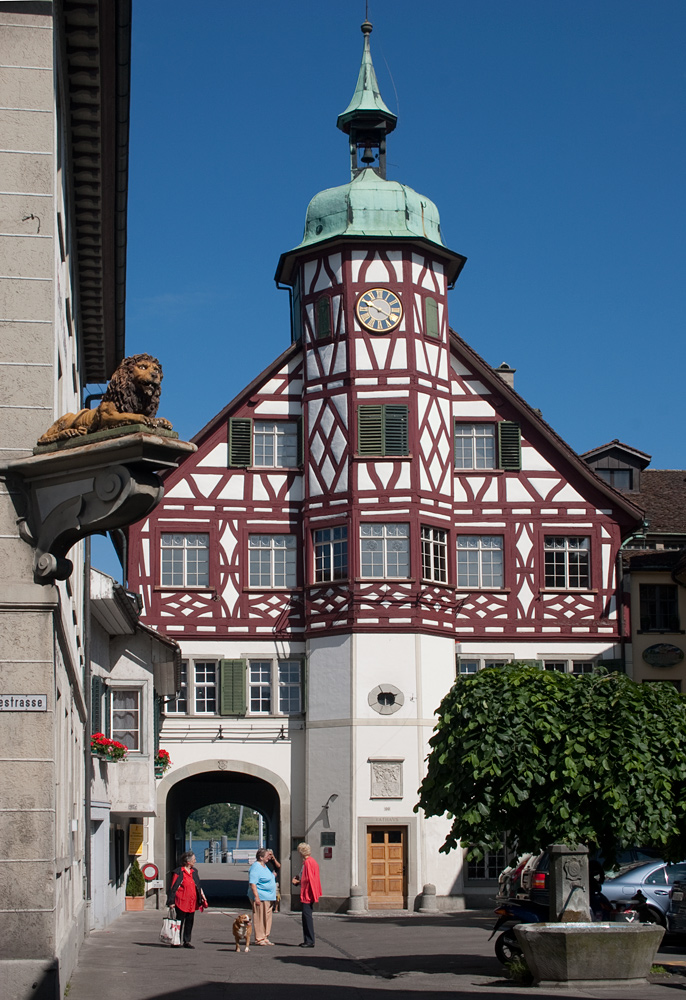
The town hall in Steckborn, built in 1667. The archway leads through to the lake.

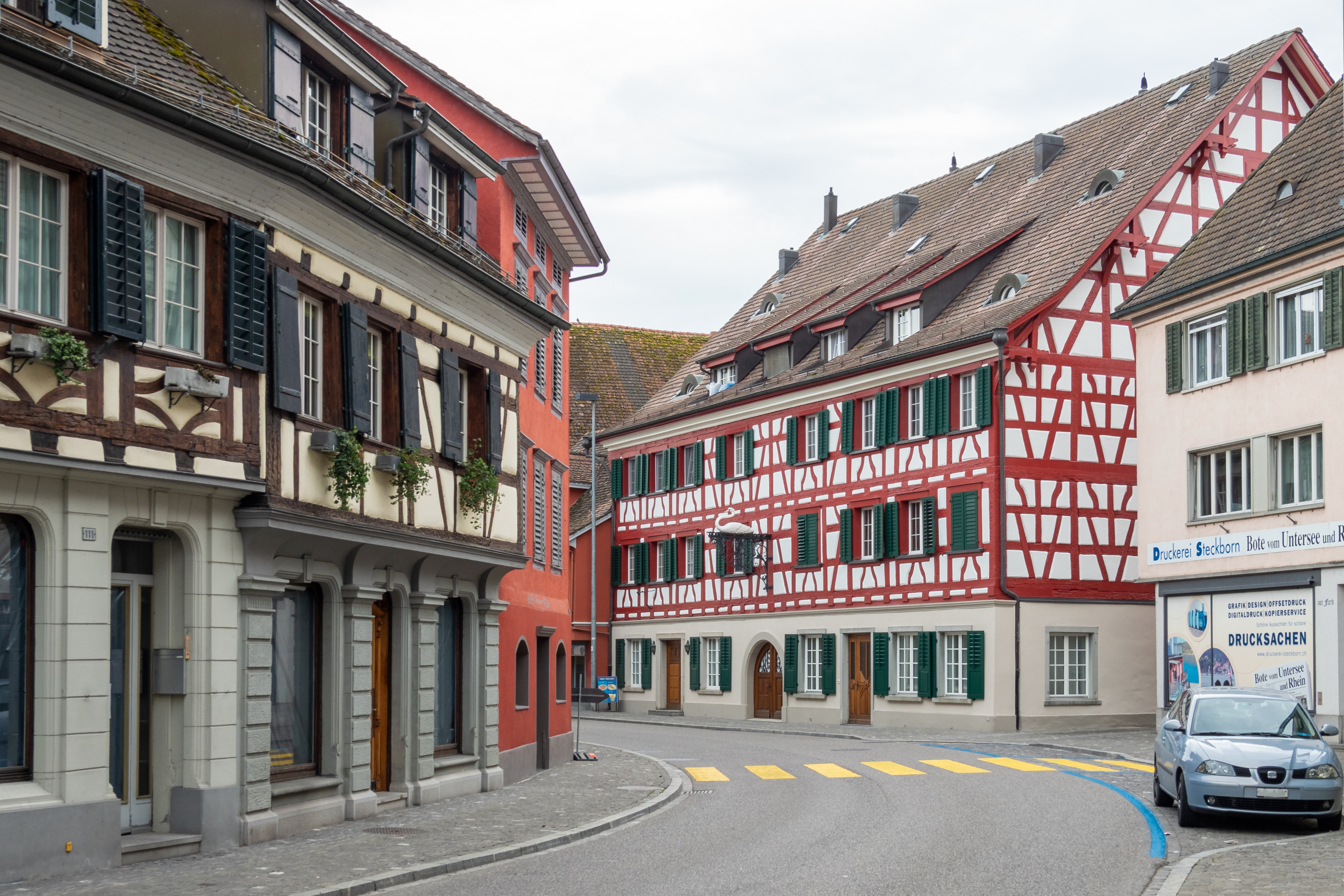
Steckborn – Seestrasse (Lake road) with former Swan Inn

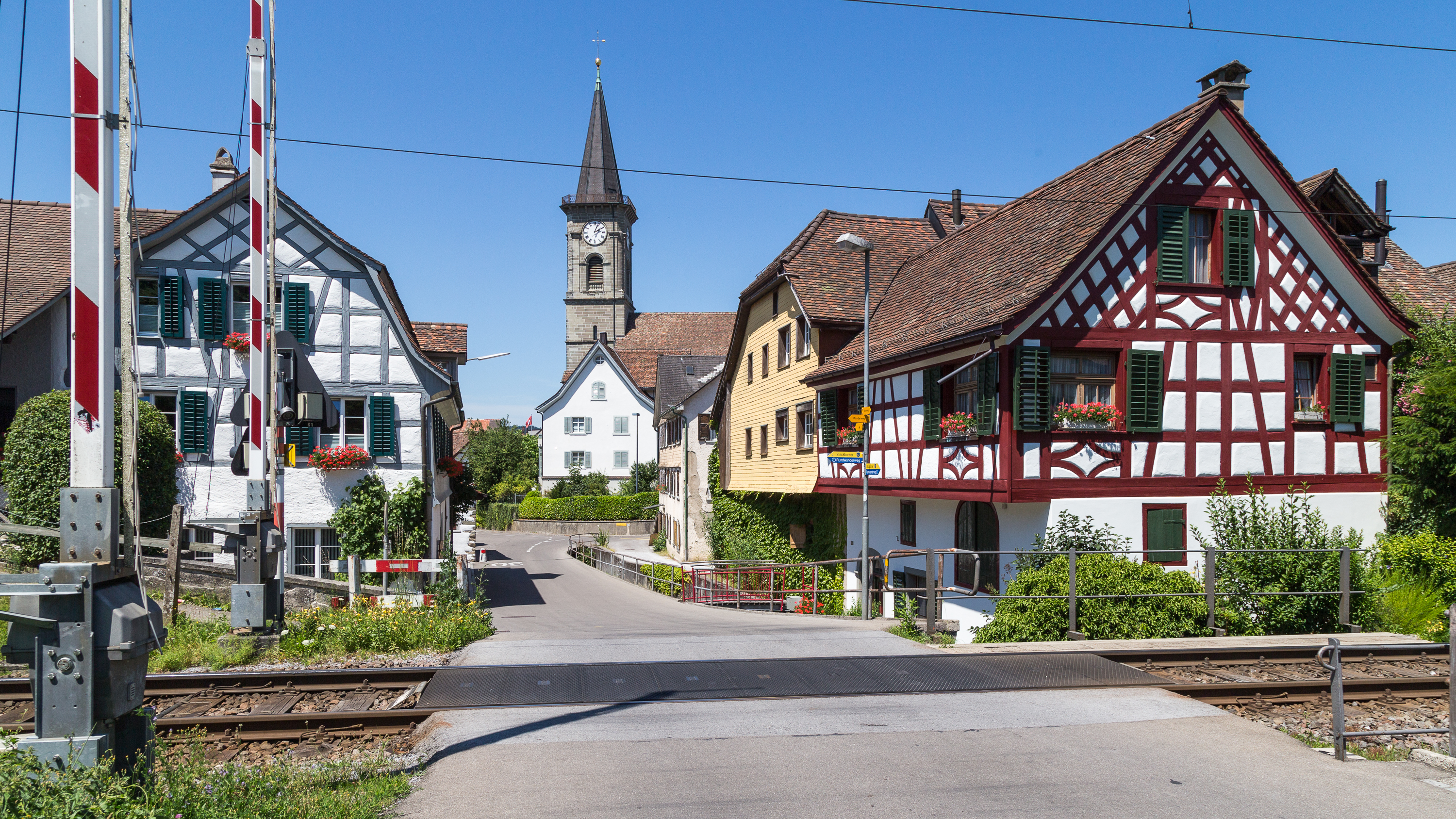
Railway line, Dorfstrasse (village street) and church tower

As of 2000, there were 1,402 private households in the municipality, and an average of 2.3 persons per household. In 2000 there were 513 single family homes (or 73.6% of the total) out of a total of 697 inhabited buildings. There were 64 two family buildings (9.2%), 35 three family buildings (5.0%) and 85 multi-family buildings (or 12.2%). There were 811 (or 24.4%) persons who were part of a couple without children, and 1,630 (or 49.1%) who were part of a couple with children. There were 179 (or 5.4%) people who lived in single parent home, while there are 34 persons who were adult children living with one or both parents, 6 persons who lived in a household made up of relatives, 30 who lived in a household made up of unrelated persons, and 130 who are either institutionalized or live in another type of collective housing. The vacancy rate for the municipality, in 2008, was 1.22%. As of 2007, the construction rate of new housing units was 3.8 new units per 1000 residents.

In 2000 there were 1,698 apartments in the municipality. The most common apartment size was the 4 room apartment of which there were 508. There were 79 single room apartments and 223 apartments with six or more rooms. As of 2000 the average price to rent an average apartment in Steckborn was 926.39 Swiss francs (CHF) per month (US$740, £420, €590 approx. exchange rate from 2000). The average rate for a one-room apartment was 460.64 CHF (US$370, £210, €290), a two-room apartment was about 669.76 CHF (US$540, £300, €430), a three-room apartment was about 824.12 CHF (US$660, £370, €530) and a six or more room apartment cost an average of 1750.34 CHF (US$1400, £790, €1120). The average apartment price in Steckborn was 83.0% of the national average of 1116 CHF.

In the 2007 federal election the most popular party was the SVP which received 37.5% of the vote. The next three most popular parties were the SP (17.1%), the FDP (16.6%) and the CVP (12.11%). In the federal election, a total of 992 votes were cast, and the voter turnout was 45.9%.

The historical population is given in the following table:

year	population
1850	1,509
1860	1,500
1870	1,649
1880	1,829
1890	1,618
1900	1,733
1950	2,846
1960	3,514
1980	3,232
1990	3,381
2000	3,320

== Heritage sites of national significance ==
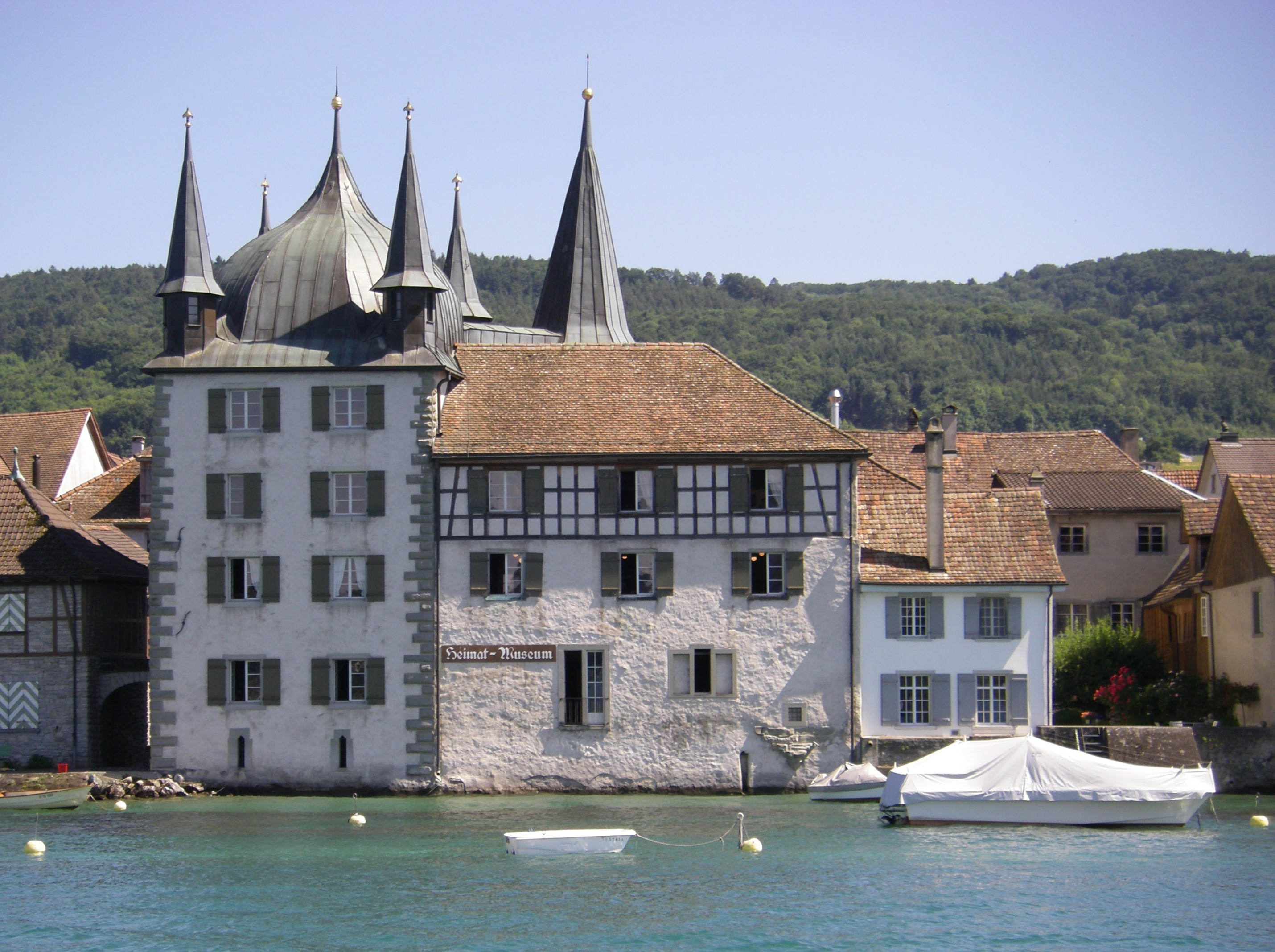
The Turmhof in Steckborn

The Reformed church and church yard on Kirchgasse and the Turmhof at Seestrasse 84 as well as the prehistoric lake side settlements at Schanz and Turgi / Feldbach are all listed as Swiss heritage sites of national significance.

The entire village of Steckborn and the region of Glarisegg are designated as part of the Inventory of Swiss Heritage Sites.

== Economy ==
As of 2007, Steckborn had an unemployment rate of 2.04%. As of 2005, there were 41 people employed in the primary economic sector and about 14 businesses involved in this sector. 580 people are employed in the secondary sector and there are 33 businesses in this sector. 720 people are employed in the tertiary sector, with 146 businesses in this sector.

In 2000 there were 2,164 workers who lived in the municipality. Of these, 800 or about 37.0% of the residents worked outside Steckborn while 623 people commuted into the municipality for work. There were a total of 1,987 jobs (of at least 6 hours per week) in the municipality. Of the working population, 9.1% used public transportation to get to work, and 43% used a private car.

== Religion ==
From the 2000 census, 1,262 or 38.0% were Roman Catholic, while 1,260 or 38.0% belonged to the Swiss Reformed Church. Of the rest of the population, there was 1 individual who belonged to the Christian Catholic faith there are 67 individuals (or about 2.02% of the population) who belong to the Orthodox Church, and there are 128 individuals (or about 3.86% of the population) who belong to another Christian church. There were 130 (or about 3.92% of the population) who are Islamic. There are 38 individuals (or about 1.14% of the population) who belong to another church (not listed on the census), 310 (or about 9.34% of the population) belong to no church, are agnostic or atheist, and 124 individuals (or about 3.73% of the population) did not answer the question.

== Transport ==
Steckborn sits on the Lake Line between Schaffhausen and Rorschach and is served by the St. Gallen S-Bahn at Steckborn railway station.

Steckborn has a landing stage. Between spring and autumn, the URh offers regular boat services on the High Rhine and Untersee between Schaffhausen and Kreuzlingen, via Konstanz.

== Education ==
In Steckborn about 66.8% of the population (between age 25–64) have completed either non-mandatory upper secondary education or additional higher education (either university or a Fachhochschule).

Steckborn is home to the Steckborn primary school district. It is also home to the Steckborn secondary school district.

In the 2008/2009 school year there are 282 students in the primary school district. There are 73 children in the kindergarten, and the average class size is 24.33 kindergartners. Of the children in kindergarten, 32 or 43.8% are female, 11 or 15.1% are not Swiss citizens and 10 or 13.7% do not speak German natively. The lower and upper primary levels begin at about age 5-6 and lasts for 6 years. There are 109 children in who are at the lower primary level and 100 children in the upper primary level. The average class size in the primary school is 21.89 students. At the lower primary level, there are 49 children or 45.0% of the total population who are female, 26 or 23.9% are not Swiss citizens and 22 or 20.2% do not speak German natively. In the upper primary level, there are 45 or 45.0% who are female, 21 or 21.0% are not Swiss citizens and 23 or 23.0% do not speak German natively.

At the secondary level, students are divided according to performance. The secondary level begins at about age 12 and usually lasts 3 years. In the secondary school district there are 174 students who are in special or remedial classes, of which 86 or 49.4% are female, 37 or 21.3% are not Swiss citizens and 32 or 18.4% do not speak German natively.

== Notable residents ==
- Karl Friedrich Gegauf (1860–1926) entrepreneur
- Fritz Gegauf (1893–1980 in Steckborn) inventor of the sewing machine and founder of Bernina International
- Susie Wolff MBE (born 1982) retired DTM Race car driver, lives in Ermatingen
