= Moos, Baden-Württemberg =

Moos
- Municipality
- Coat of arms

- Location of Moos within Konstanz district
- Interactive map of Moos
- Location within Germany Location within Baden-Württemberg
- Coordinates: 47°43′30″N 08°56′03″E
- Country: Germany
- State: Baden-Württemberg
- Admin. region: Freiburg
- District: Konstanz

Government
  - Mayor (2018–26): Patrick Krauss

Area
  - Total: 14.38 km^{2} (5.55 sq mi)
- Elevation: 393 m (1,289 ft)

Population (2025-12-31)
  - Total: 3,415
  - Density: 237.5/km^{2} (615.1/sq mi)
- Time zone: UTC+01:00 (CET)
  - Summer (DST): UTC+02:00 (CEST)
- Postal codes: 78345
- Dialling codes: 07732
- Vehicle registration: KN
- Website: www.moos.de

Moos (German pronunciation: [moːs]) is a town on Lake Constance in the district of Konstanz in Baden-Württemberg, Germany. The town is located on the Höri Peninsula, and includes the villages of Bankholzen, Iznang, Moos and Weiler. It borders the city of Radolfzell to the north, Singen (Hohentwiel) to the west, Gaienhofen and Öhningen to the south, and Lake Constance to the east.
