= Radolfzell =

- Town
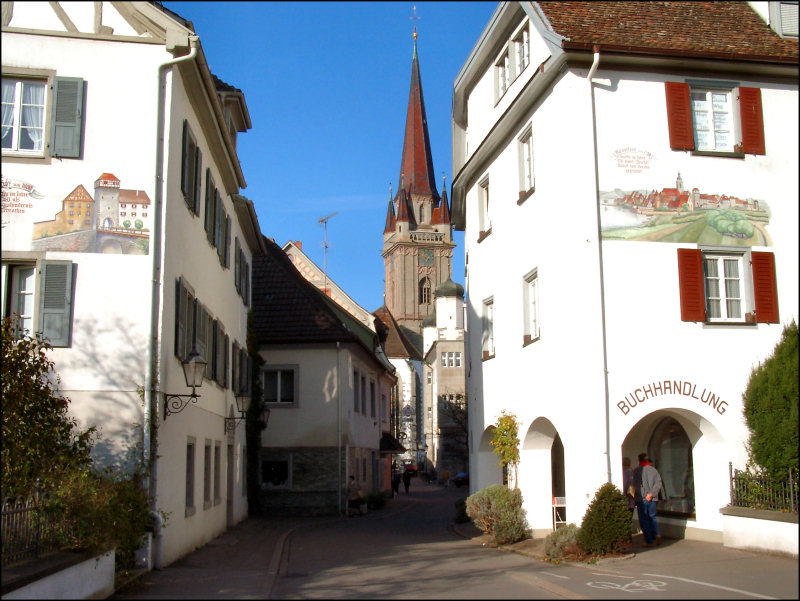
- Centre of the town

- Coat of arms

- Location of Radolfzell within Konstanz district
- Interactive map of Radolfzell
- Location within Germany Location within Baden-Württemberg
- Coordinates: 47°44′N 8°58′E
- Country: Germany
- State: Baden-Württemberg
- Admin. region: Freiburg
- District: Konstanz

Government
  - Mayor (2021–29): Simon Gröger (Ind.)

Area
  - Total: 58.55 km^{2} (22.61 sq mi)
- Elevation: 398 m (1,306 ft)

Population (2025-12-31)
  - Total: 31,689
  - Density: 541.2/km^{2} (1,402/sq mi)
- Time zone: UTC+01:00 (CET)
  - Summer (DST): UTC+02:00 (CEST)
- Postal codes: 78301-78315
- Dialling codes: 07732
- Vehicle registration: KN
- Website: www.radolfzell.de

Radolfzell am Bodensee (German pronunciation: [ˌʁaːdɔlfˈtsɛl ʔam ˈboːdn̩zeː], lit. 'Radolfzell on the Lake Constance') is a town in the state of Baden-Württemberg, Germany, located at the western end (Zeller Lake) of Lake Constance, approximately 18 km (11 mi) northwest of the city of Konstanz (Constance). It is the third largest town, after Konstanz and Singen, in the district of Konstanz.

It is situated in the Hegau region. The mouth of the river Radolfzeller Aach is located west of Radolfzell.

It is a well-known health care town (Mettnau-Kur). In 1990, Radolfzell was named the Federal Environment Capital City of Germany.

== History ==
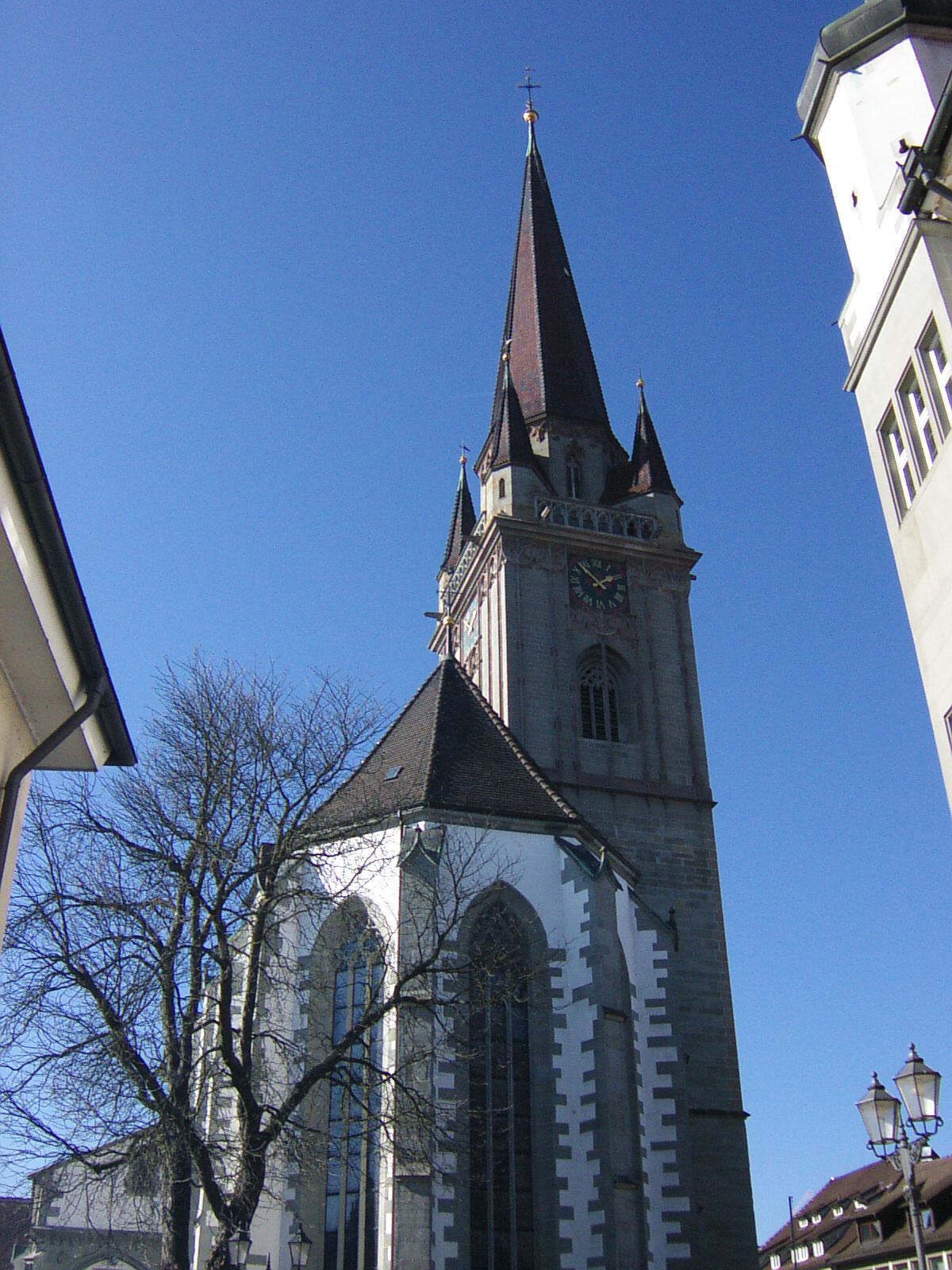
Cathedral Unserer lieben Frau

This town developed out of a monastery founded in 826 AD as a "cell" under Bishop Radolf of Verona. The town belonged to the Abbey of Reichenau, then for a long time to the House of Habsburg, and for 40 years it was a Free Imperial City.

In the centre is the Gothic Cathedral Unserer lieben Frau (lit. 'Of our Dear Lady'), dating from the 15th century and decorated in the Baroque style in the 18th. One particularly beautiful feature is the Rosary altar by the Zürn brothers and the Master of the House's Altar (1750) which contains the relics of the local Radolfzell saints Theopont, Senesius and Zeno. The Hausherrenfest is celebrated in their honour every year on the third Sunday in July, and the next day a famous Water Procession is held, as it has been every year since 1797. The citizens of the nearby village of Moos make a pilgrimage to Radolfzell in picturesquely decorated boats to fulfil an ancient oath.

A notable structure in the town is the Austrian mansion in the market square, built in stages from the 17th to the 19th century, the knightly hall dating from 1626. Also of note are a number of historical Patrician houses.

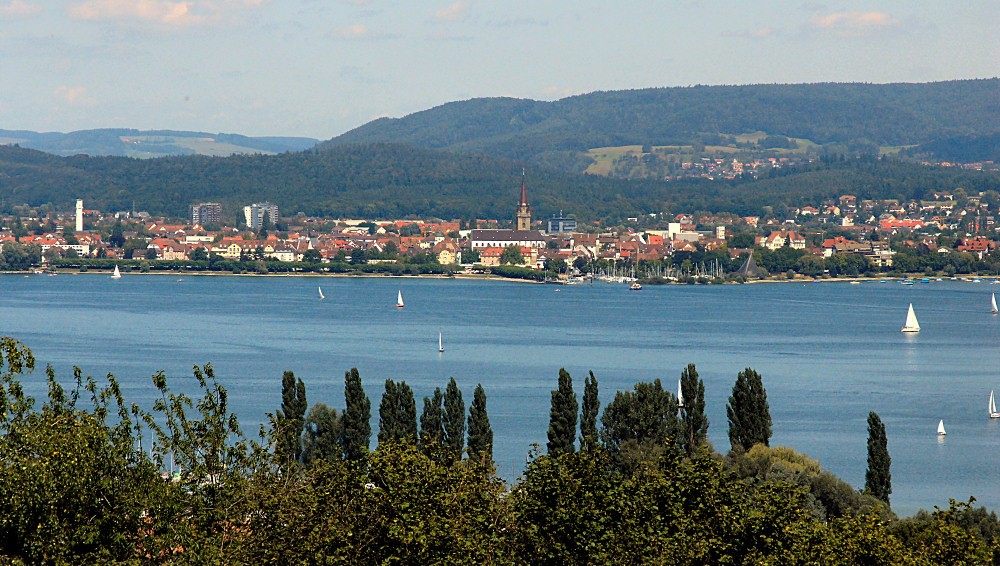
Radolfzell View from Höri peninsula

== Mayors ==
(Lord Mayor since 1975)

- Before 1700 Baltasar Feldkirch
- 1793–1808: Anton Leibes
- 1808–1814: Josef Hermanuz
- 1815–1816: Max Frey
- 1817–1822: Peter Mayer
- 1823–1825: Josef Grüner
- 1825–1838: Anton Spachholz
- 1838–1851: Johann Baptist Mohr
- 1851–1852: Josef Spachholz
- 1852–1864: Johann Häusler
- 1864–1865: Johann Drescher
- 1866–1867: Dominik Noppel
- 1867–1880: Josef Anton Vogt
- 1880–1891: Konstantin Noppel
- 1891–1894: August Sommer
- 1894–1902: Franz Mattes
- 1902–1911: Heinrich Riedlinger
- 1911–1934: Otto Blesch
- 1934–1935: Eugen Speer
- 1935–1942: Josef Jöhle
- 1942–1945: August Kratt, temp assistant
- 1945: Otto Blesch
- 1945–1955: Wilhelm Gohl
- 1955–1968: Hermann Albrecht
- 1968–1976: Fritz Riester
- 1976–2000: Günter Neurohr (1935-2011)
- 2000–2013: Jörg Schmidt, (born 1960)
- 2013–2021: Martin Staab (born 1964)
- 2021– : Simon Gröger

== Twin towns – sister cities ==
Radolfzell am Bodensee is twinned with:

- Istres, France (1974)
- Amriswil, Switzerland (1999)

== Notable people ==
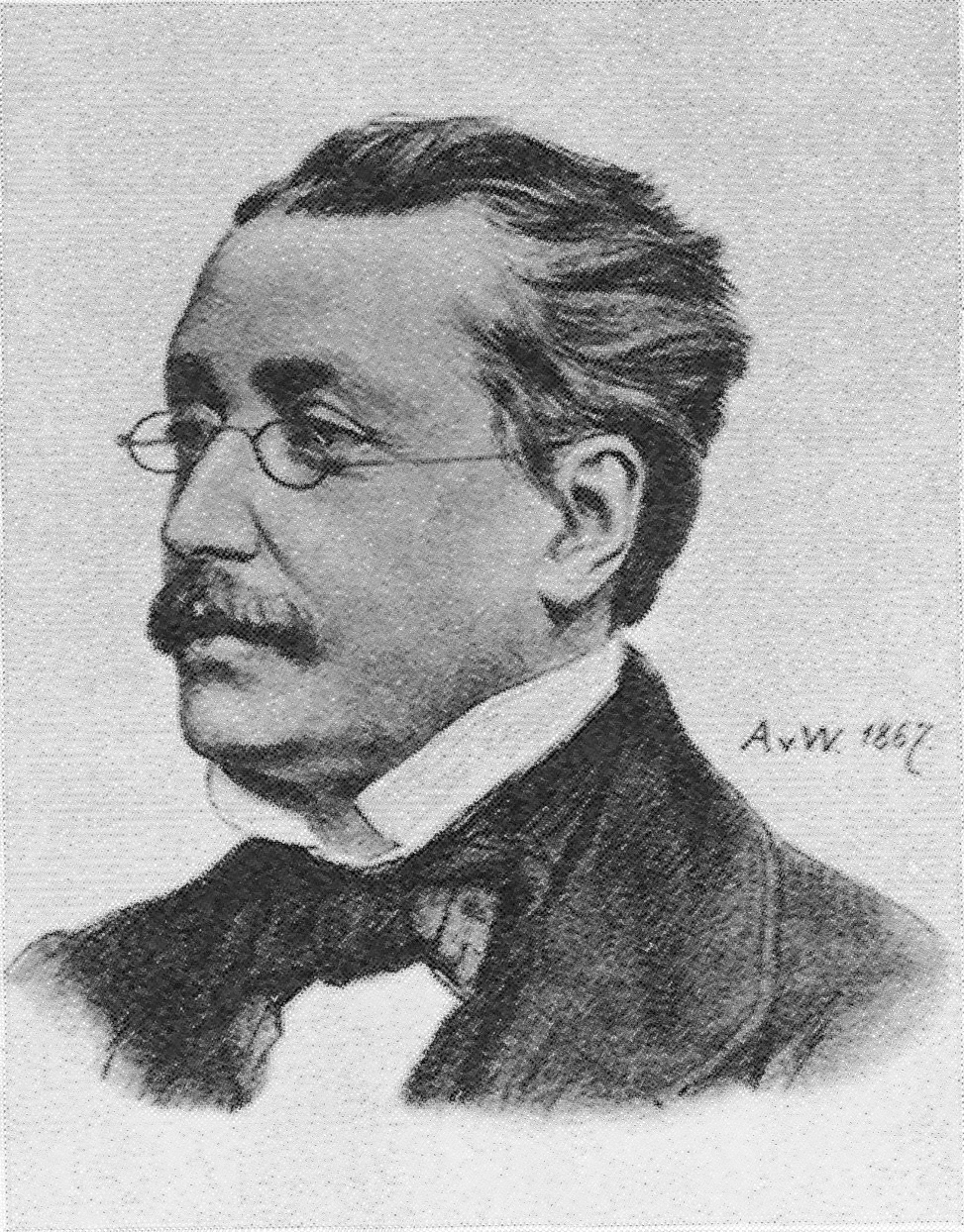
Joseph Victor von Scheffel

- Marcus Teggingeri (1540–1600), Roman Catholic prelate
- Matthias Rauchmiller (1645-1686), painter, sculptor and ivory carver
- Joseph Victor von Scheffel (1826–1886) poet and novelist, retired in Radolfzell.
- Emil Joseph Diemer (1908–1990), chess player
- Hans Peter Haller (1929–2006), composer and pioneer of electroacoustic music.
- Wolfgang Ruf (born 1941), musicologist and academic
- Werner Bodendorff (born 1958), musicologist and writer
- Jörg Baberowski (born 1961), historian

=== Sport ===
- Josef Eichkorn (born 1956), football coach
- Patrick Baur (born 1965), tennis player
- Sabine Auer (born 1966), tennis player
- Pit Beirer (born 1972), motocross rider
- Markus Knackmuß (born 1974), footballer, played over 380 games
- Kristof Wilke (born 1985), belt rower, team gold medallist at the 2012 Summer Olympics
- Anna-Lena Forster (born 1995), para-alpine skier

== Transportation ==
Radolfzell railway station is an important junction station on the High Rhine Railway (Basel Bad Bf–Konstanz) and the Hegau-Ablach Valley Railway (leading to the Stahringen–Friedrichshafen railway to Friedrichshafen Stadt).

Radolfzell harbour is connected to Iznang, Reichenau Island and Konstanz via shipping route.

== See also ==
- Lower Lake Constance (Untersee)
- Bodanrück Peninsula
- Mettnau Peninsula
- Markelfinger Winkel
