= Öhningen =

- Municipality
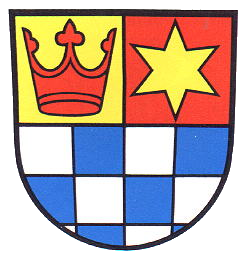
- Coat of arms

- Location of Öhningen within Konstanz district
- Interactive map of Öhningen
- Location within Germany Location within Baden-Württemberg
- Coordinates: 47°39′41″N 8°53′19″E
- Country: Germany
- State: Baden-Württemberg
- Admin. region: Freiburg
- District: Konstanz

Government
  - Mayor (2022–30): Andreas Schmid (CDU)

Area
  - Total: 28.18 km^{2} (10.88 sq mi)
- Elevation: 499 m (1,637 ft)

Population (2025-12-31)
  - Total: 3,518
  - Density: 124.8/km^{2} (323.3/sq mi)
- Time zone: UTC+01:00 (CET)
  - Summer (DST): UTC+02:00 (CEST)
- Postal codes: 78337
- Dialling codes: 07735
- Vehicle registration: KN
- Website: www.oehningen.de

Öhningen (German pronunciation: [ˈøːnɪŋən]) is a municipality on the western edge of Lake Constance where it forms the border between Switzerland and the district of Konstanz (or Constance) in Baden-Württemberg in Germany.

== World Heritage Site ==
It is home to one or more prehistoric pile-dwelling (or stilt house) settlements that are part of the Prehistoric Pile dwellings around the Alps UNESCO World Heritage Site.

== Palaeontology ==
The discovery of the fossil Andrias scheuchzeri in 1726 by the Zurich city physician Johann Jakob Scheuchzer in Öhningen placed this town firmly in the history annals of palaeontology because Scheuchzer interpreted his find as the skeletal remains of a child who suffered the biblical deluge, and which he referred to as Homo diluvii. Later in the 1770s it was determined to be a fossilized lizard. It was finally identified as the giant salamander in 1811 by George Cuvier after he hacked gently away at the specimen to reveal the limbs.

The site at Öhningen has also yielded a rich material of other fossils including many Miocene insects, of which the pioneer student was Oswald Heer.

== Twin towns ==
Öhningen is twinned with:

- Mérinchal, France, since 1984

== Transport ==
There are two landing stages, Öhningen and Wangen. Between spring and autumn, the URh offers regular boat services on the High Rhine and Untersee between Schaffhausen and Kreuzlingen, via Konstanz.

== Notable people ==
- Florian Schneider, (1947–2020) co-founder of electronic band Kraftwerk
