= Gaienhofen =

- Municipality
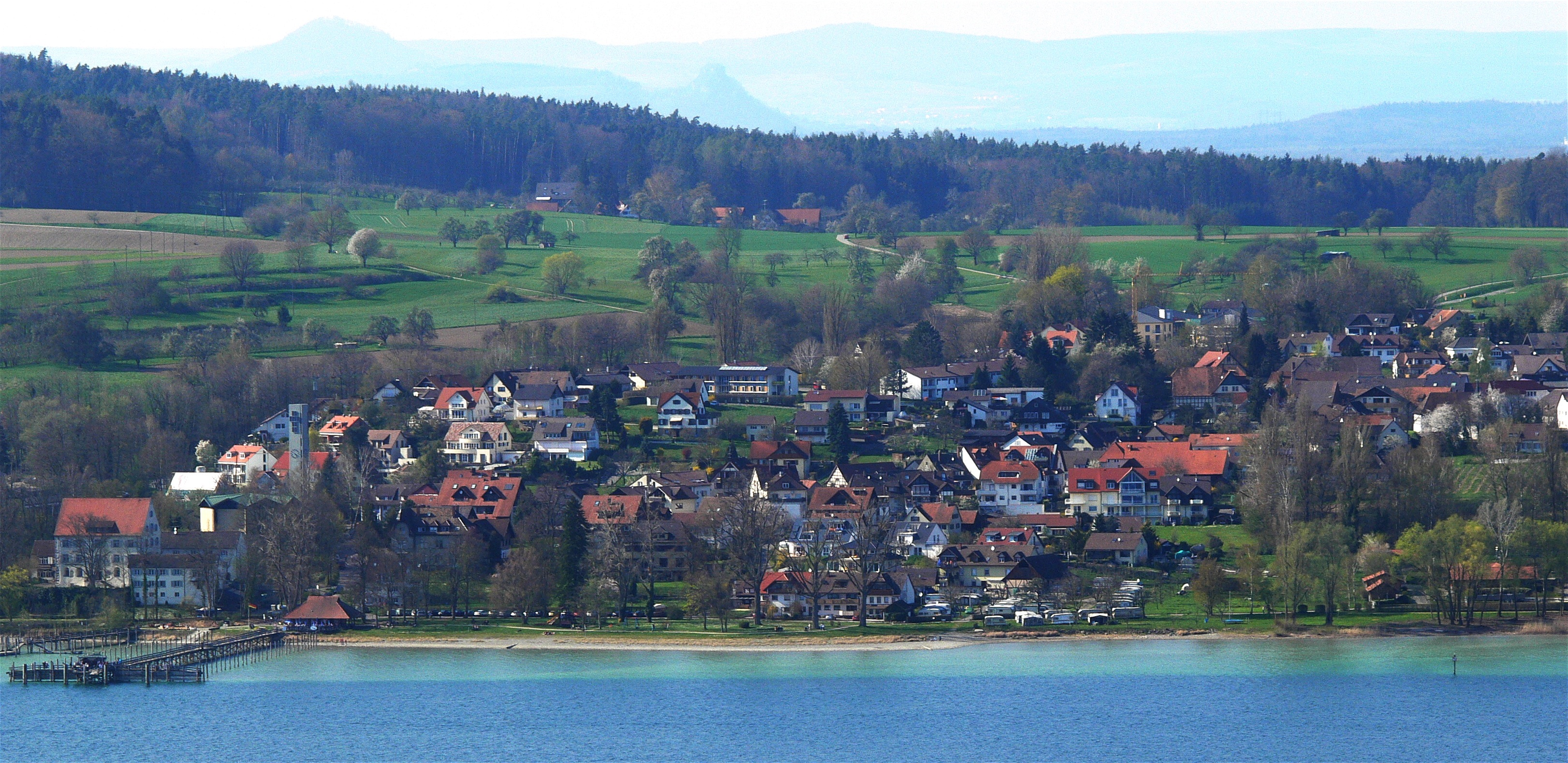
- Gaienhofen seen from Switzerland

- Coat of arms

- Location of Gaienhofen within Konstanz district
- Interactive map of Gaienhofen
- Location within Germany Location within Baden-Württemberg
- Coordinates: 47°40′59″N 8°58′56″E
- Country: Germany
- State: Baden-Württemberg
- Admin. region: Freiburg
- District: Konstanz

Government
  - Mayor (2022–30): Jürgen Maas

Area
  - Total: 12.52 km^{2} (4.83 sq mi)
- Elevation: 425 m (1,394 ft)

Population (2025-12-31)
  - Total: 3,353
  - Density: 267.8/km^{2} (693.6/sq mi)
- Time zone: UTC+01:00 (CET)
  - Summer (DST): UTC+02:00 (CEST)
- Postal codes: 78343
- Dialling codes: 07735
- Vehicle registration: KN
- Website: www.gaienhofen.de

Gaienhofen (German pronunciation: [ɡaɪənˈhoːfn̩]) is a municipality in the district of Konstanz in Baden-Württemberg in Germany. It is located at the border with Switzerland.

Since 1974, Gaienhofen consists of four villages: Gaienhofen, Gundholzen, Hemmenhofen and Horn. Attractions, apart from the Lake of Constance, include the Hermann-Hesse-Höri-Museum and the Museum Haus Dix.

== World heritage site ==
It is home to one or more prehistoric pile-dwelling (or stilt house) settlements that are part of the Prehistoric Pile dwellings around the Alps UNESCO World Heritage Site.

== Twin towns ==
Gaienhofen is twinned with:

- Saint-Georges-de-Didonne, France
- Balatonföldvár, Hungary

== Transport ==
There are two landing stages, Gaienhofen and Hemmenhofen. Between spring and autumn, the URh offers regular boat services on the High Rhine and Untersee between Schaffhausen and Kreuzlingen, via Konstanz.

== Gallery ==
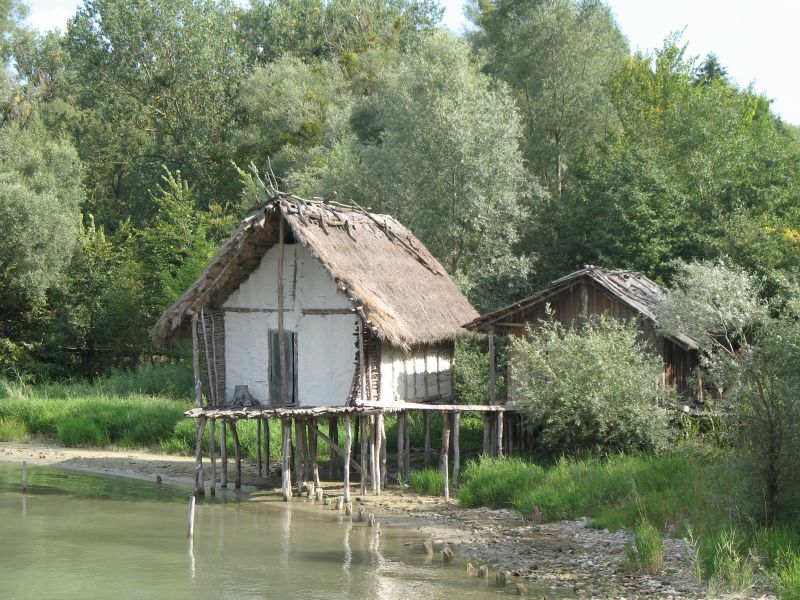
Stone Age housings (reconstructed) in Unteruhldingen

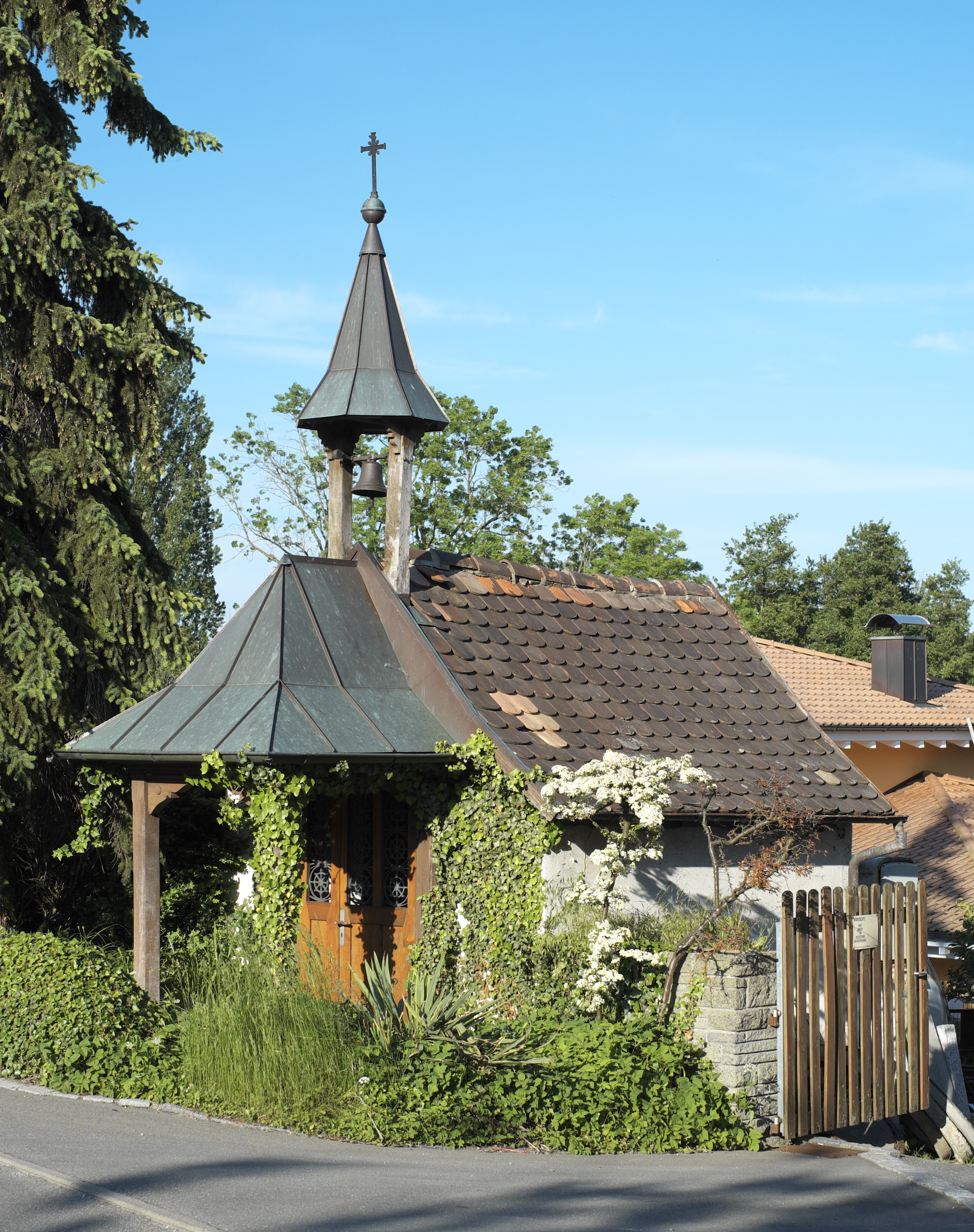
Chapel in Gaienhofen-Hemmenhofen

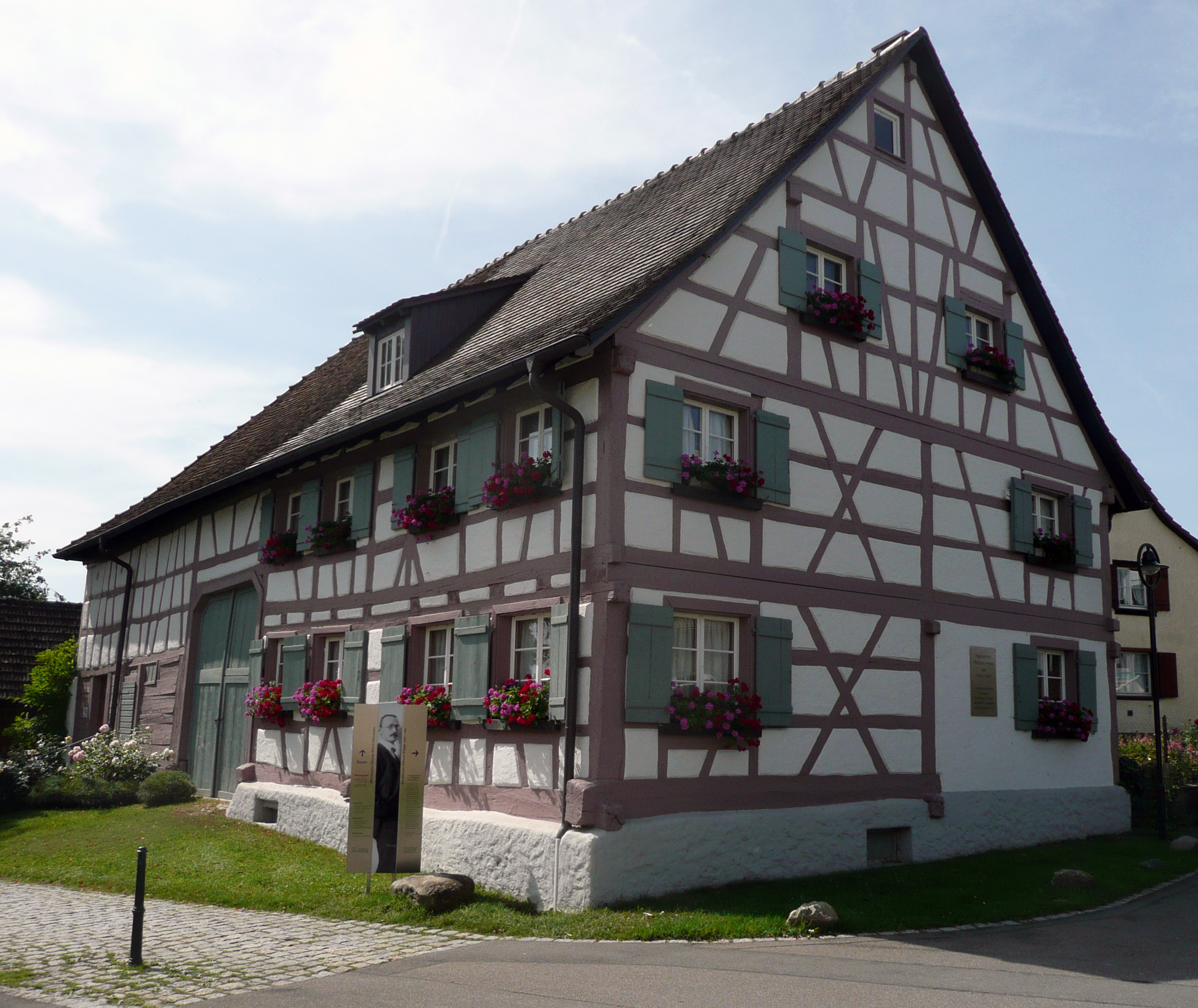
First house of Hermann Hesse and his first wife Maria Bernoulli (Mia)

== See also ==
- Erich Heckel
- Hermann Hesse
