= Bodanrück =

Peninsula in Germany

Coordinates: 47°45′N 9°04′E

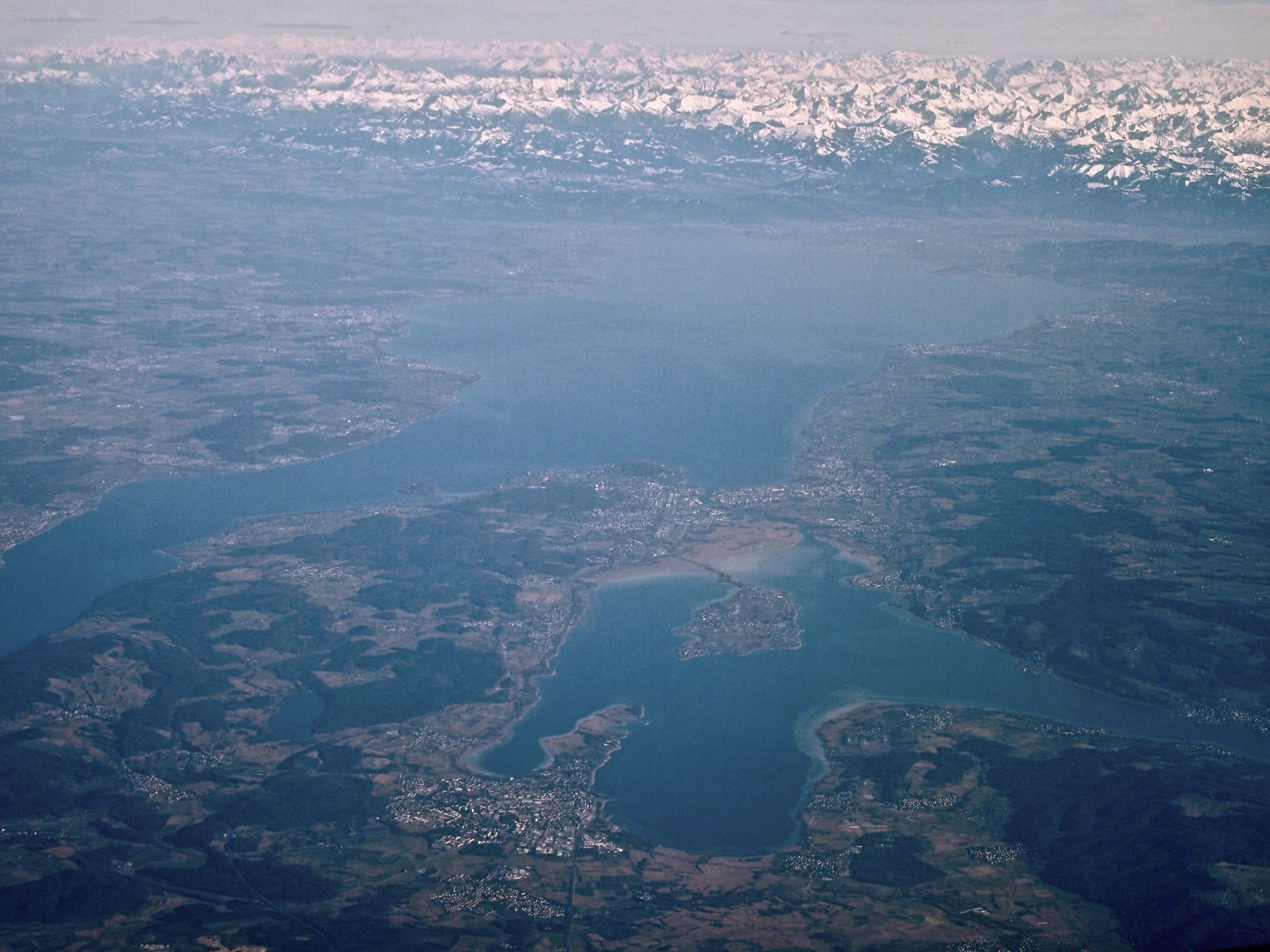
Bodanrück peninsula separating the Überlinger See (left center) from the Untersee (bottom right).

Bodanrück (lit. 'Bodan rise') is the 112 km^{2} (43 sq mi) wide peninsula that divides Lake Constance (Bodensee) into Überlinger See (part of Obersee) and Gnadensee, which is part of Untersee. At its southern end, it reaches the Seerhein, which links Obersee with Untersee.

It is bordered by the island of Mainau to the east and Triboldingerbohl and Reichenau Islands to the west. The Markelfinger Winkel separates it from the Mettnau peninsula. The nature reserve Wollmatinger Ried lies at the southern shore of Bodanrück. Mindelsee is a small lake located on the peninsula.

Bodanrück lies entirely within the Konstanz district in the south of the German state of Baden-Württemberg. It was historically part of the Hegau region in the Duchy of Swabia. The northern part of the city of Konstanz, Radolfzell (Markelfingen) and Allensbach are located on the peninsula. The settlements on the western shore are connected with Konstanz station via the High Rhine Railway line.

== See also ==
- List of peninsulas
