= Aach, Baden-Württemberg =

Aach
- Town
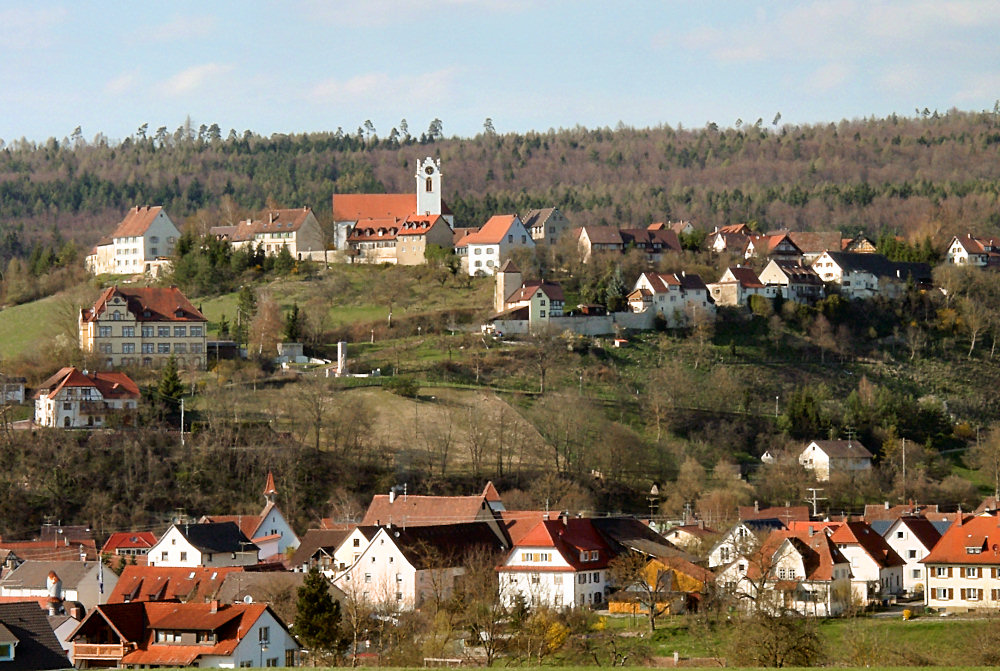

- Coat of arms

- Location of Aach within Konstanz district
- Interactive map of Aach
- Location within Germany Location within Baden-Württemberg
- Coordinates: 47°50′44″N 8°51′6″E
- Country: Germany
- State: Baden-Württemberg
- Admin. region: Freiburg
- District: Konstanz

Government
  - Mayor (2017–25): Manfred Ossola (CDU)

Area
  - Total: 10.68 km^{2} (4.12 sq mi)
- Elevation: 545 m (1,788 ft)

Population (2025-12-31)
  - Total: 2,375
  - Density: 222.4/km^{2} (576.0/sq mi)
- Time zone: UTC+01:00 (CET)
  - Summer (DST): UTC+02:00 (CEST)
- Postal codes: 78267
- Dialling codes: 07774
- Vehicle registration: KN
- Website: www.aach.de

Aach (German pronunciation: [ˈaːx]) is a small town in the German state of Baden-Württemberg (the region of Hegau). Being situated close to Lake Constance and the Swiss border, it is mostly known for the Aachtopf — Germany's biggest natural spring in terms of production. The town was originally twinned with the region of Colmnitz, but following the integration of Colmnitz into Klingenberg, Saxony the town is now twinned with Klingenberg itself.

== History ==
Aach was first mentioned in the year 1100, as part of the Duchy of Swabia. By the year 1150 the settlement was known in Latin as Oppidum Ach in Hegovia. In 1200, the lords transferred ownership of the town to the Prince-Bishopric of Constance. Aach was granted town rights in 1283 by King Rudolph I of Germany. For the next centuries it was a part of Further Austria until the House of Habsburg purchased the County of Nellenburg, the county in which Aach was situated.

In 1499 battles of the Swabian War took place right before gates of Aach. Only 26 years later, in 1525, the German Peasants' War reached Aach, when region's aristocrats flew from the uprisings to the city, whereupon it was occupied by the rebel peasants. However, the uprisings were thrown down quickly by September 1525.

On March 25, 1799, there was a battle in Aach between Austria and France in the Napoleonic Wars. After Austria's defeat in the Third Coalition 1805, Aach came to the Kingdom of Württemberg (from 1810 the Grand Duchy of Baden), which joined the German Empire in 1871.

After World War II Aach became a part of the new (West) German state of Baden-Württemberg. Following district boundary redrawings in 1973, the city moved from the Stockach district to its current distract, Konstanz.

=== Jewish history ===
The first record of Jews in Aach is dated to 1518, in which the Jews of nearby Geisingen were accused of murdering a Christian child, an incident that can be considered a Blood libel. Every ten years, the local Jews were required to renew their residence permits. Between 1560 and 1570, five Jewish families resided in the town. Jews could host a maximum of five guests. They were required to notify the authorities upon the arrival of a Jewish visitor, and he could not trade with the local townspeople. In 1583, residence rights, now truncated to five-year increments, were renewed for Aach's six Jewish families. Additional restrictions were imposed on the town Jews, forbidding them to deal with agricultural products, and chant at the synagogue.

=== Population change ===
Year	Population	Change (%)	Year	Population	Change (%)	Year	Population	Change (%)
1871	914	n/a	1950	1117	+1.9	1990	1575	+13.6
1880	954	+4.4	1956	1274	+14.1	1995	1973	+25.3
1890	949	-0.5	1961	1453	+14.1	2000	2113	+7.1
1900	972	+2.4	1965	1427	-1.8	2005	2230	+5.5
1910	1011	+4.0	1970	1355	-5.0	2010	2175	-2.5
1925	1014	+0.3	1975	1415	+4.4	2015	2243	+3.1
1933	960	-5.3	1980	1387	-1.98	2020	2314	+3.2
1939	1096	+14.2	1987	1387	=	2025	n/a	n/a
Source: Statistisches Landesamt Baden-Württemberg: Struktur- und Regionaldatenbank

== Geography ==
Aach is situated at the edge of the Hegau — a volcanic landscape between Lake Constance and the Swabian Alb mountains. To the north, behind the Upper Danube, is the Swabian Alb. A few kilometres to the east and southeast are the branches of Lake Constance, Überlinger See and Zeller See.The German–Swiss border lies about 14 km to the southeast.

The neighbouring settlements are Eigeltingen in the north, Orsingen-Nenzingen in the east, Volkertshausen in the south, and Mühlhausen-Ehingen in the west.

=== Land zoning ===
The following table shows the percentage of land in the town allocated for specific users, as of 31 December in the respective years.

Zone	1988	2000	2010
Agricultural land	50.7 %	47.9%	42.6 %
Forest	40.4 %	40.7 %	41.8 %
Housing and transport	7.9 %	10.6 %	13.2 %
Water	0.7 %	0.6 %	1.1 %
Other	0.3 %	0.2 %	1.3 %
Source: Statistisches Landesamt Baden-Württemberg: Struktur- und Regionaldatenbank

=== Climate ===
Aach has a humid continental climate (Köppen: Dfb; Trewartha: Dclo).

The Aach weather station has recorded the following extreme values:

- Highest Temperature 38.2 °C (100.8 °F) on 19 August 1943.
- Lowest Temperature −26.0 °C (−14.8 °F) on 2 January 1985.
- Wettest Year 1,140.9 mm (44.92 in) in 1965.
- Driest Year 487.8 mm (19.20 in) in 1943.
- Highest Daily Precipitation: 70.5 mm (2.78 in) on 11 October 1975.
- Earliest Snowfall: 28 October 1939.
- Latest Snowfall: 21 April 1980.

Climate data for Aach, 1961–1990 normals, extremes 1937–1986
Month	Jan	Feb	Mar	Apr	May	Jun	Jul	Aug	Sep	Oct	Nov	Dec	Year
Record high °C (°F)	16.6 (61.9)	17.6 (63.7)	23.0 (73.4)	28.4 (83.1)	32.0 (89.6)	35.8 (96.4)	37.2 (99.0)	38.2 (100.8)	33.0 (91.4)	27.2 (81.0)	21.8 (71.2)	14.8 (58.6)	38.2 (100.8)
Mean maximum °C (°F)	8.2 (46.8)	10.5 (50.9)	17.1 (62.8)	22.6 (72.7)	26.4 (79.5)	29.8 (85.6)	31.4 (88.5)	30.7 (87.3)	26.7 (80.1)	21.2 (70.2)	15.6 (60.1)	9.8 (49.6)	32.3 (90.1)
Mean daily maximum °C (°F)	1.3 (34.3)	3.8 (38.8)	8.9 (48.0)	13.3 (55.9)	17.8 (64.0)	21.4 (70.5)	23.7 (74.7)	22.9 (73.2)	19.8 (67.6)	13.3 (55.9)	6.5 (43.7)	2.2 (36.0)	12.9 (55.2)
Daily mean °C (°F)	−1.4 (29.5)	0.0 (32.0)	3.7 (38.7)	7.8 (46.0)	12.2 (54.0)	15.8 (60.4)	17.7 (63.9)	16.7 (62.1)	13.5 (56.3)	8.4 (47.1)	3.1 (37.6)	−0.5 (31.1)	8.1 (46.6)
Mean daily minimum °C (°F)	−4.6 (23.7)	−3.6 (25.5)	−0.8 (30.6)	2.5 (36.5)	6.3 (43.3)	9.5 (49.1)	11.2 (52.2)	10.9 (51.6)	8.1 (46.6)	4.2 (39.6)	−0.2 (31.6)	−3.4 (25.9)	3.3 (37.9)
Mean minimum °C (°F)	−13.8 (7.2)	−11.5 (11.3)	−7.9 (17.8)	−3.2 (26.2)	−0.3 (31.5)	3.3 (37.9)	5.4 (41.7)	5.1 (41.2)	2.0 (35.6)	−2.5 (27.5)	−7.5 (18.5)	−12.2 (10.0)	−16.7 (1.9)
Record low °C (°F)	−26.0 (−14.8)	−23.0 (−9.4)	−16.4 (2.5)	−7.8 (18.0)	−5.2 (22.6)	−1.4 (29.5)	2.6 (36.7)	2.2 (36.0)	−2.7 (27.1)	−6.8 (19.8)	−14.8 (5.4)	−21.2 (−6.2)	−26.0 (−14.8)
Average precipitation mm (inches)	52.2 (2.06)	45.4 (1.79)	45.8 (1.80)	56.6 (2.23)	81.6 (3.21)	96.9 (3.81)	86.1 (3.39)	94.9 (3.74)	59.0 (2.32)	49.4 (1.94)	63.3 (2.49)	52.1 (2.05)	783.4 (30.84)
Average extreme snow depth cm (inches)	14.2 (5.6)	12.8 (5.0)	6.7 (2.6)	1.3 (0.5)	0 (0)	0 (0)	0 (0)	0 (0)	0 (0)	0 (0)	5.6 (2.2)	7.8 (3.1)	21.0 (8.3)
Average precipitation days (≥ 0.1 mm)	17.0	13.5	14.9	15.3	17.2	16.0	14.4	15.2	11.4	13.8	15.3	15.6	179.6
Average relative humidity (%)	87.9	83.0	78.6	73.6	74.1	73.8	73.0	76.6	80.5	85.3	87.0	88.6	80.2
Source: Deutscher Wetterdienst/SKlima.de

== Law and government ==
Aach has formed a cooperation with the nearby City of Engen sharing some of its administrative domains.

Aach has a city council with ten seats. The last elections in 2017 brought five for the CDU, and five seats for independent voters' associations. Aach's mayor is Manfred Ossola, elected in 2017 with 97.42% of the vote at a 70.4% turnout rate. He succeeded the term of Severin Graf, mayor from December 2001 until December 2017.

Party	Vote Share	Seats	2014 Result
CDU	47.93 %	5	40.5 %, 4 Seats
Freie Wählervereinigung Aach	41.23 %	4	30.0 %, 3 Seats
Unabhängige Freie Liste Aach	10.84 %	1	–
SPD	–	–	23.8 %, 2 Seats
FDP	–	–	5.6 %, 1 Seat

=== Coat of arms ===

Blazon: "In red a golden (yellow) lion with three silver (white) stars distributed between the paws."

Significance: The lion can be considered as an indication of the affiliation to Habsburg. The stars served to distinguish it from the coat of arms of the dominion.

== Landmarks ==
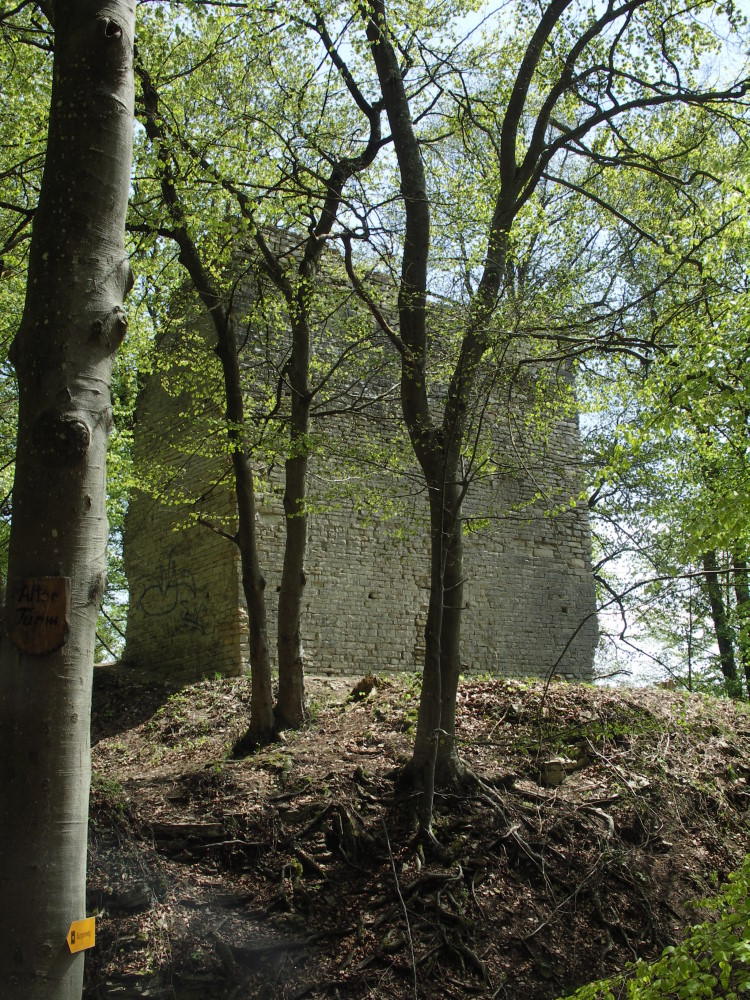
Tower of Aach

=== Buildings ===
- The old town hall at Stadtstraße 38 was named as "monument of the month" for November 2008 by the Denkmalstiftung Baden-Württemberg.
- On the edge of the town lies the old ruins of the Tower of Aach, dating back to the 11th century.

=== Natural beauties ===
The Aachtopf, the strongest spring in Germany, is located in the town area of Aach. The Aachtopf is the source of the Radolfzeller Aach, which flows into Lake Constance. It is fed by the water of the Danube, which seeps northwards about twelve kilometres (as the crow flies) from the source of the Aach between Immendingen and Fridingen in the karstified limestone of the White Jurassic (Danube seepage) and emerges here with an average discharge of 8,300 L/s (minimum 1,300 L/s, maximum 24,100 L/s).

== Economy and Infrastructure ==
=== Business ===
Various commercial enterprises are located in the town of Aach, most of them in an inter-municipal commercial area with the municipality of Volkertshausen.

=== Education ===
In Aach there is a public primary school with circa 100 pupils. The public secondary school was closed in summer 2010 after only 13 pupils attended this school in the last school year. There is also a kindergarten in Aach.

=== Transport ===
The nearest train station is five kilometres away in Mühlhausen-Ehingen. There are connections to long-distance trains from Singen, twelve kilometres away, or from the station in Engen, six kilometres away.

Bus connections go to Singen, Stockach and in the direction of Engen.

Aach is not far from the Hegau motorway junction. There are fast connections in all directions via the Bundesstraße 81, the Bundesstraße 98 and the two-lane Landesstraße 33. The town is also located on Landesstraße 31 (Freiburg im Breisgau-Friedrichshafen).

== Personalities ==
- Otto Trippel (1891–1954), Documentary filmmaker
- Andreas Mettler (* 1968), Games designer and developer
- Thomas Rid (* 1975), Political Scientist and non-fiction author
