= Werd (Lake Constance) =

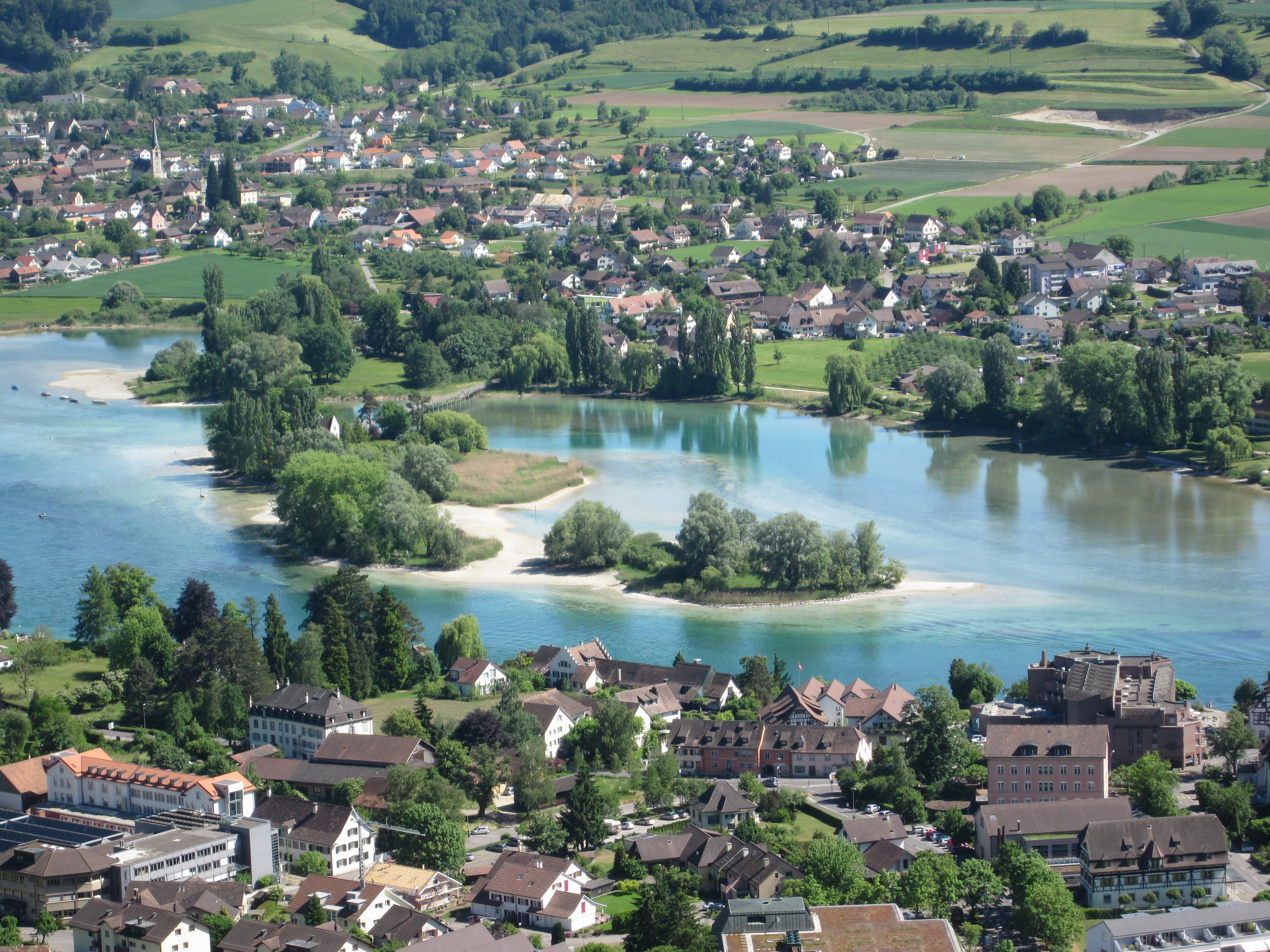
- Werd archipelago

- Location within Switzerland Location within Canton of Thurgau

Geography
- Location: Situated on lake Untersee (Lake Constance)
- Coordinates: 47°39′20″N 08°52′00″E
- Archipelago: Im Werd (also: Werd Islands)
- Area: 0.016 km^{2} (0.0062 sq mi)
- Length: 0.19 km (0.118 mi)
- Width: 0.11 km (0.068 mi)
- Highest elevation: 398 m (1306 ft)

Administration
- Switzerland
- Canton: Thurgau
- Municipality: Eschenz

Demographics
- Population: 9

UNESCO World Heritage Site
- Official name: Insel Werd
- Part of: Prehistoric pile dwellings around the Alps
- Criteria: Cultural: (iv), (v)
- Reference: 1363-034
- Inscription: 2011 (35th Session)

Werd Island is the main island of the small island group Werd Islands in the westernmost part of the Lower Lake of Lake Constance just before the High Rhine leaves the part of the lake known as the Rhine Lake (Rheinsee). It is located on Swiss territory between Stein am Rhein and Eschenz.

== History ==
The Werd was already inhabited in 5000 BC, using stilt houses. Stone tools used by hunter-gatherers in the Middle Stone Age have been found. In the Neolithic, Werd provided an ideal place to settle. Between 1931 and 1935, the island was excavated under the direction of Karl Keller-Tarnuzzer. Numerous items such as stone axes, arrowheads, a flint sickle, pottery shards, bone fishhooks from the Neolithic and the Bronze Age came to light. Tools, weapons and jewelry from the Bronze Age were found.

Water levels of Lake Constance fell to an extreme low in the winter of 2005–2006. This uncovered a large waterfront areas and some prehistoric artifacts. A selection of prehistoric, Roman Era and medieval artifacts is on display at the entrance of the refectory on the island. Other important finds are now housed in the Museum of Archaeology in Frauenfeld and in the local museum in Eschenz.

In 50 BCE, the Romans built a pile bridge between Rhaetia and Magna Germania via the island. The two bridge sections had a length of 220 and 217 meters and a width of six meters. This Roman road, known in the literature as the Rheatian Boundary Street led from the Vicus Tasgetium (Eschenz) via Rielasingen, Singen, Friedingen, Steißlingen, Orsingen, Vilsingen and Inzigkofen to a ford across the Danube at Laiz. In Orsingen there was a junction to Pfullendorf and Burgweiler. Near Dürren Ast, there was a further junction through the Ablach Valley to Meßkirch, Krauchenwies and Mengen-Ennetach.

== Chapel ==
Saint Othmar, the first abbot of the Abbey of St. Gall was sent into exile to Werd in 759. He died on Werd on 16 November of that year. The St. Othmar chapel on the island was erected in his memory in the 15th Century. It belongs to the Catholic parish of Eschenz.

The island is owned by the Benedictine Einsiedeln Abbey. It is, however, leased by the Franciscans; they live in a house attached to the chapel.

== Archipelago ==
Werd is the main island of a small island group. It has an area of 1.59 hectare belongs to the ward Untereschenz of the municipality of Eschenz, in the Swiss Canton Thurgau. The highest point of the island is 398 metres above sea level or 2 metres above lake level (396 m).

It is connected to the south bank of the river by a 125 meter long wooden bridge.

The two smaller islands in the group belong to the municipality of Stein am Rhein of Canton of Schaffhausen. They are uninhabited and form the nature reserve and bird sanctuary Middle and lower Werdli. Middle Werdli island has an area of 0.4 hectares; Lower Werdli measures 0.6 hectares.

The boundary between the cantons of Thurgau and Schaffhausen, follows the center line of the Rhine here.

The bridge at Stein am Rhein is generally considered to be the boundary between the Lower Lake of Lake Constance and the High Rhine. The Werd islands lie just above the bridge and are therefore inland islands, not river islands. The Western tip of Lower Werli is about 320 meters upstream from the bridge.

== Gallery ==
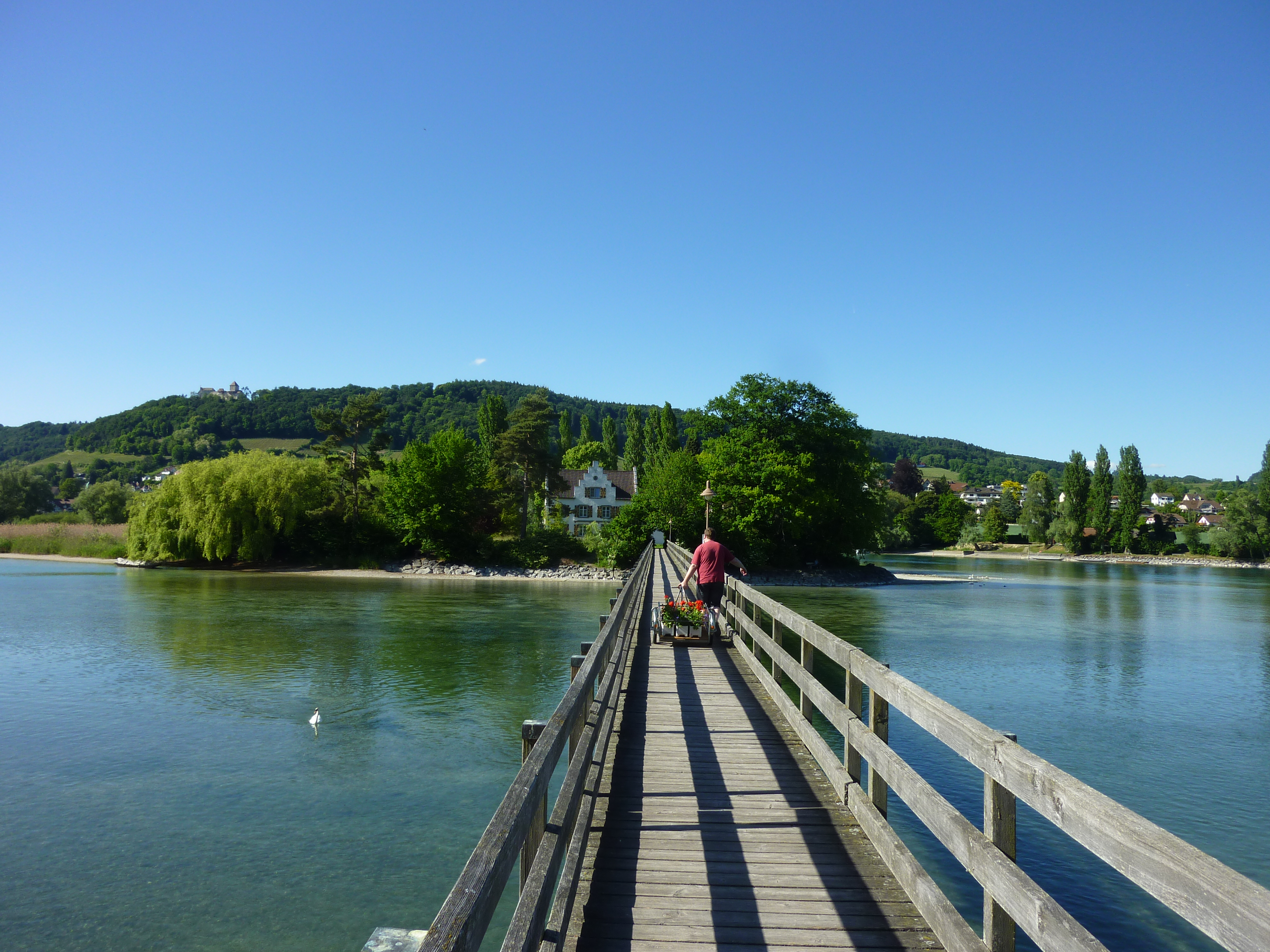
Bridge to the main island

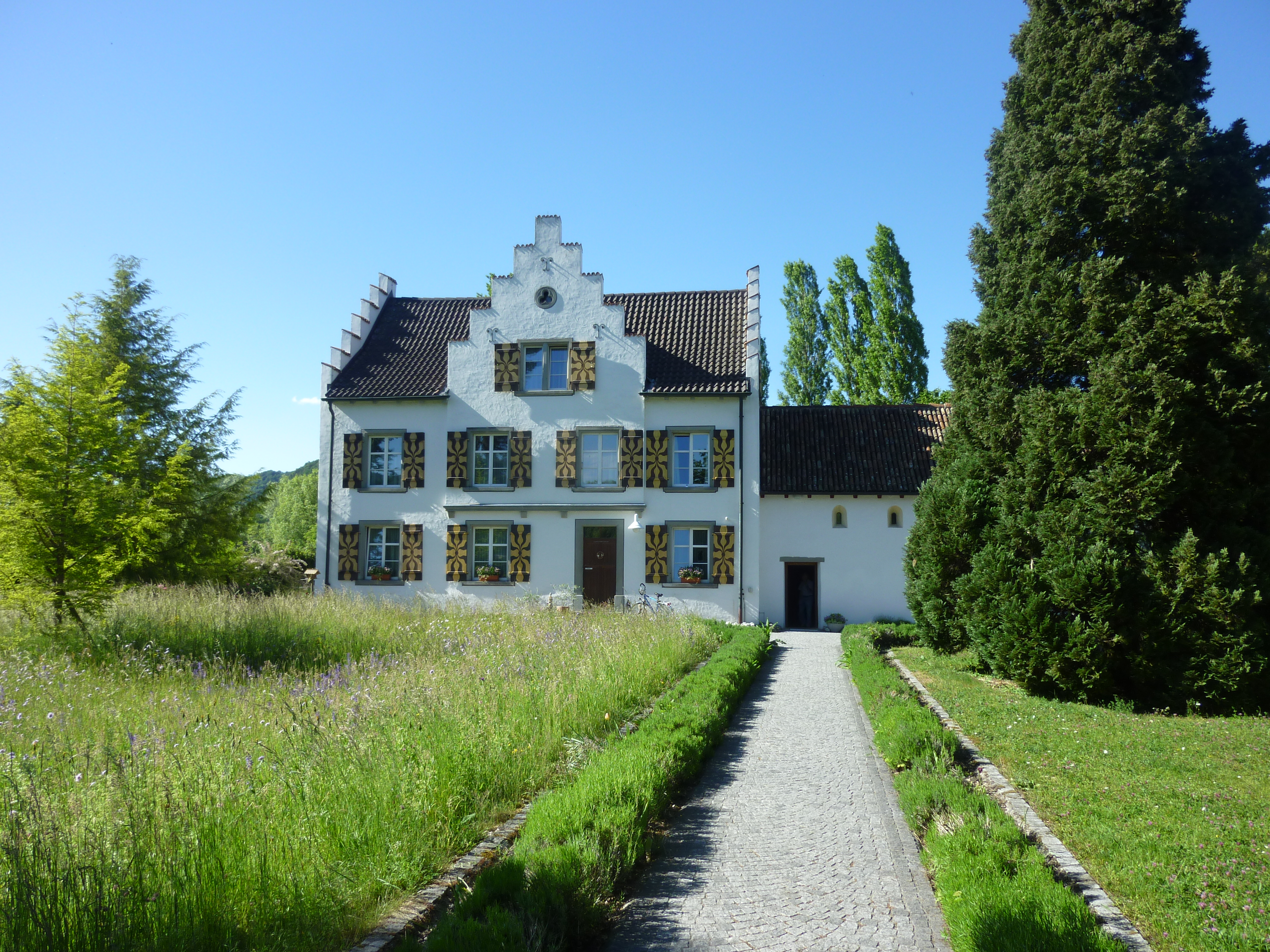
Convent

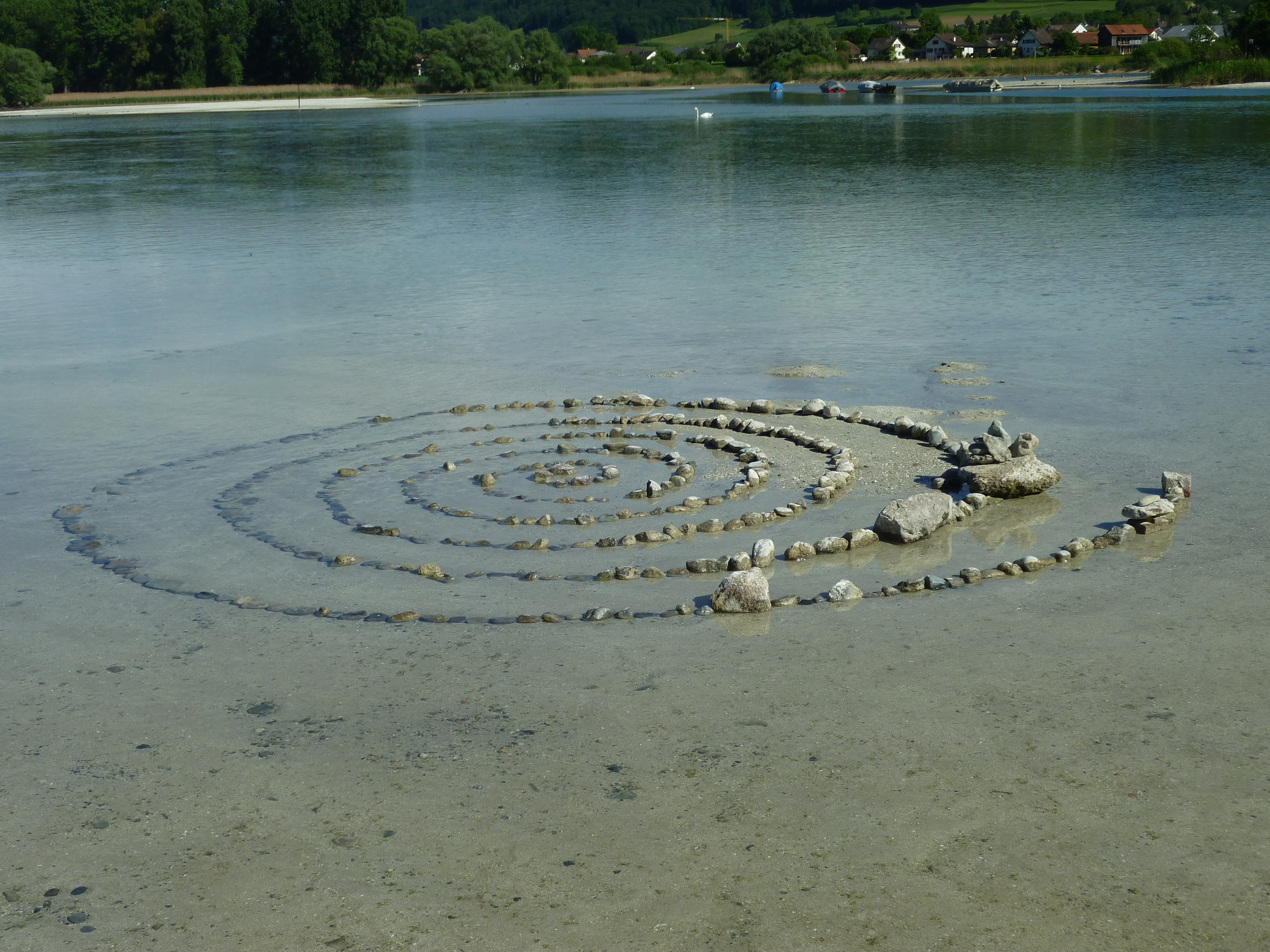
Spirals in the Rhine before the island

== See also ==
- List of islands of Switzerland

== References and sources ==
- Heinz Finke: Inselspaziergänge. Werd, Liebesinsel, Reichenau, Mainau, Dominikanerinsel, Lindau., 1991, ISBN 3-87685-122-X
- Karl Keller-Tarnuzzer: Die Inselleute vom Bodensee, 1935
