= Liebesinsel (Lake Constance) =

Island in Germany

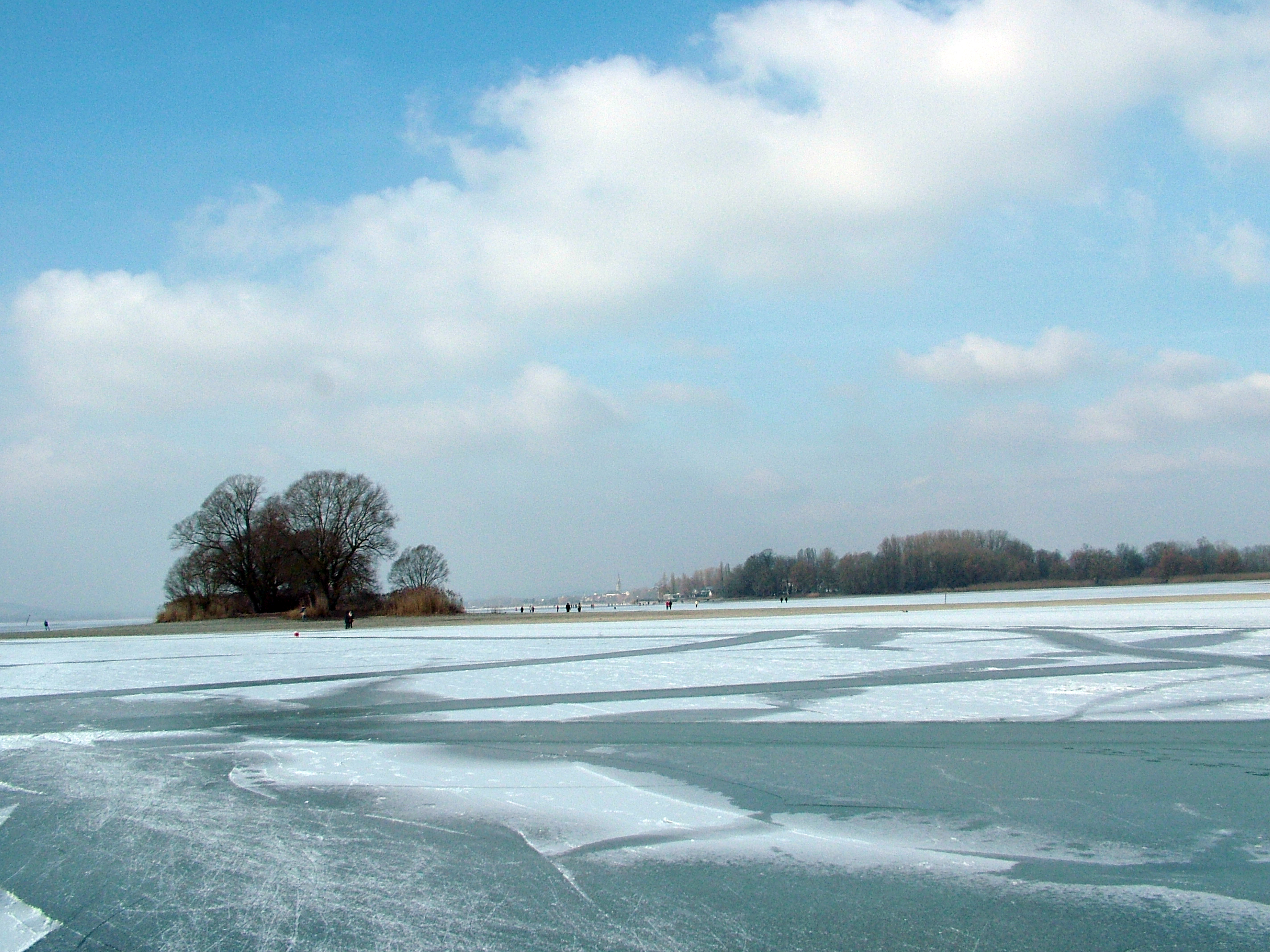
- The Liebesinsel. Background: the Mettnau peninsula

Geography
- Coordinates: 47°43′18″N 9°0′19″E
- Adjacent to: Zeller See, Untersee, Lake Constance
- Area: 0.00262 km^{2} (0.00101 sq mi)
- Length: 0.097 km (0.0603 mi)
- Width: 0.042 km (0.0261 mi)

Administration
- Germany

Demographics
- Population: 0

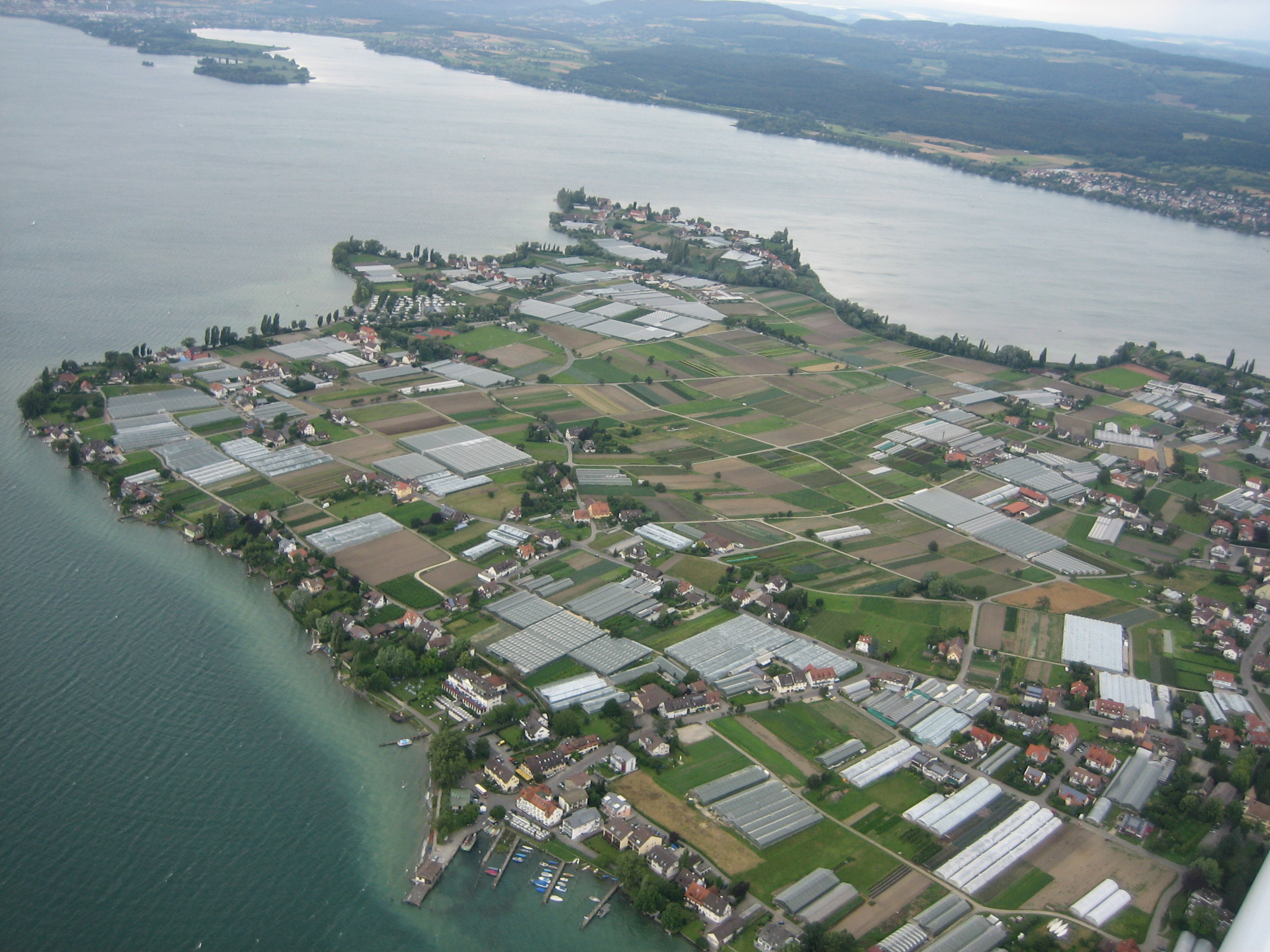
Oblique aerial photography with the western part of the island of Reichenau. Background: the Mettnau peninsula and, left of it, the little Liebesinsel.

The Liebesinsel ("Love Island") is a small, uninhabited island on Lake Constance in Germany.

== Geography ==
The Liebesinsel is located on the Zeller See, a lake in the Untersee, which itself is part of Lake Constance. It is about 200 metres south of the peninsula of Mettnau. The island is part of the Mettnau Peninsula Nature Reserve in the borough of Radolfzell am Bodensee.

Its area, previously estimated to be between 2,100 and 2,200 m^{2} (23,000 and 24,000 sq ft), was precisely determined on 16 January 2012 when the survey office of the District Office of Constance carried out a new survey. According to that survey, the Liebesinsel has an area of 2,620 m^{2} (28,200 sq ft), a length of 97 metres (318 ft) and a width of between 15 and 42 metres (49 and 138 ft).

During the original cadastral survey of the region from 1867 to 1871, the Liebesinsel was surveyed for the first time. In simplified terms, it was represented as an irregular square and was given an area of 2 morgens and 150 square rods, which is more than twice the area measured in 2012.

== History ==
The island was the location for the 1956 regional film Die Fischerin vom Bodensee under the direction of Harald Reinl. On the island the night of love of the main characters, Hans (Gerhard Riedmann) and Maria (Marianne Hold) was filmed.

== Literature ==
- Heinz Finke (1990), Inselspaziergänge: Werd, Liebesinsel, Reichenau, Mainau, Dominikanerinsel, Lindau (in German), Konstanz: Rosengarten Verlag, ISBN 3-87685-122-X
- Rund um den Bodensee 1 : 75 000. Rad- und Freizeitkarte (in German) (4. ed.), GeoMap, 2014, ISBN 3-933671-88-4
