= Zeller See (Lake Constance) =

Lake in Baden-Württemberg, Germany

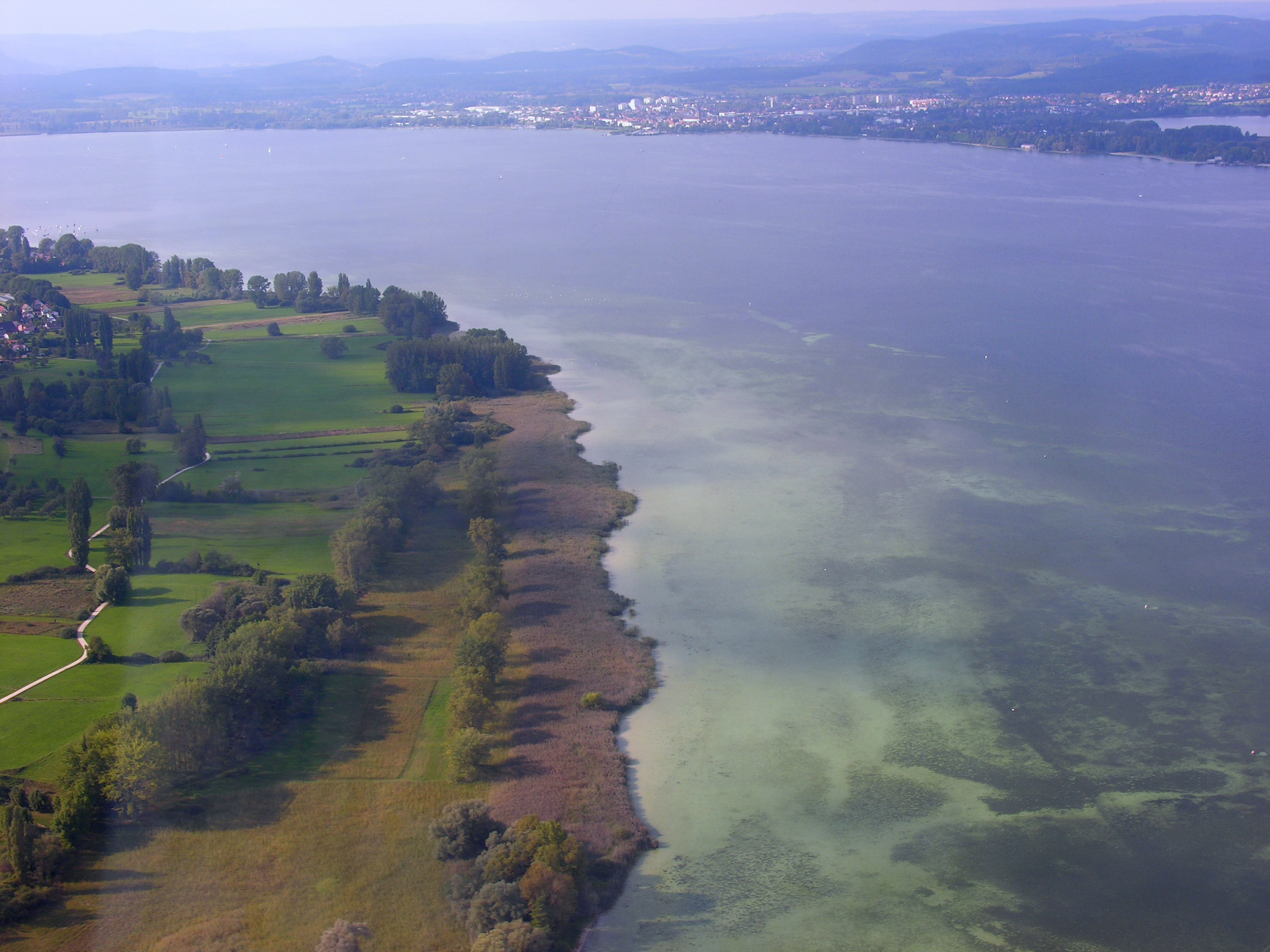
- Zeller See, aerial photograph with view of the Hornspitze auf der Höri Nature Reserve near Gaienhofen looking towards Radolfzell

- Location within Germany
- Location: Baden-Württemberg
- Coordinates: 47°43′13″N 08°58′58″E
- Part of: Untersee (Lake Constance)
- Primary inflows: Radolfzeller Aach
- Primary outflows: Rheinsee
- Max. length: 5.4 km (3.4 mi)
- Max. width: 2.35 km (1.46 mi)
- Surface area: 11 km^{2} (4.2 sq mi)
- Max. depth: 22 metres (72 ft)
- Surface elevation: 395.3 m (1,297 ft)
- Islands: Liebesinsel
- Settlements: Radolfzell

The Zeller See (Standard German of Germany; Swiss Standard German: Zellersee; could be translated as "Lake of Radolfzell") is part of the Lower Lake, the lower part of Lake Constance. It lies in the bay of Radolfzell, and between the peninsula of Mettnau to the north and the peninsula of Höri to the south. To the west it is bounded by the ried of the Radolfzeller Aach.

The Zeller See has a maximum depth of 22 metres.

== See also ==
- Obersee (Lake Constance)
- Gnadensee
- Rheinsee
