= Untersee (Lake Constance) =

Basin of Lake Constance

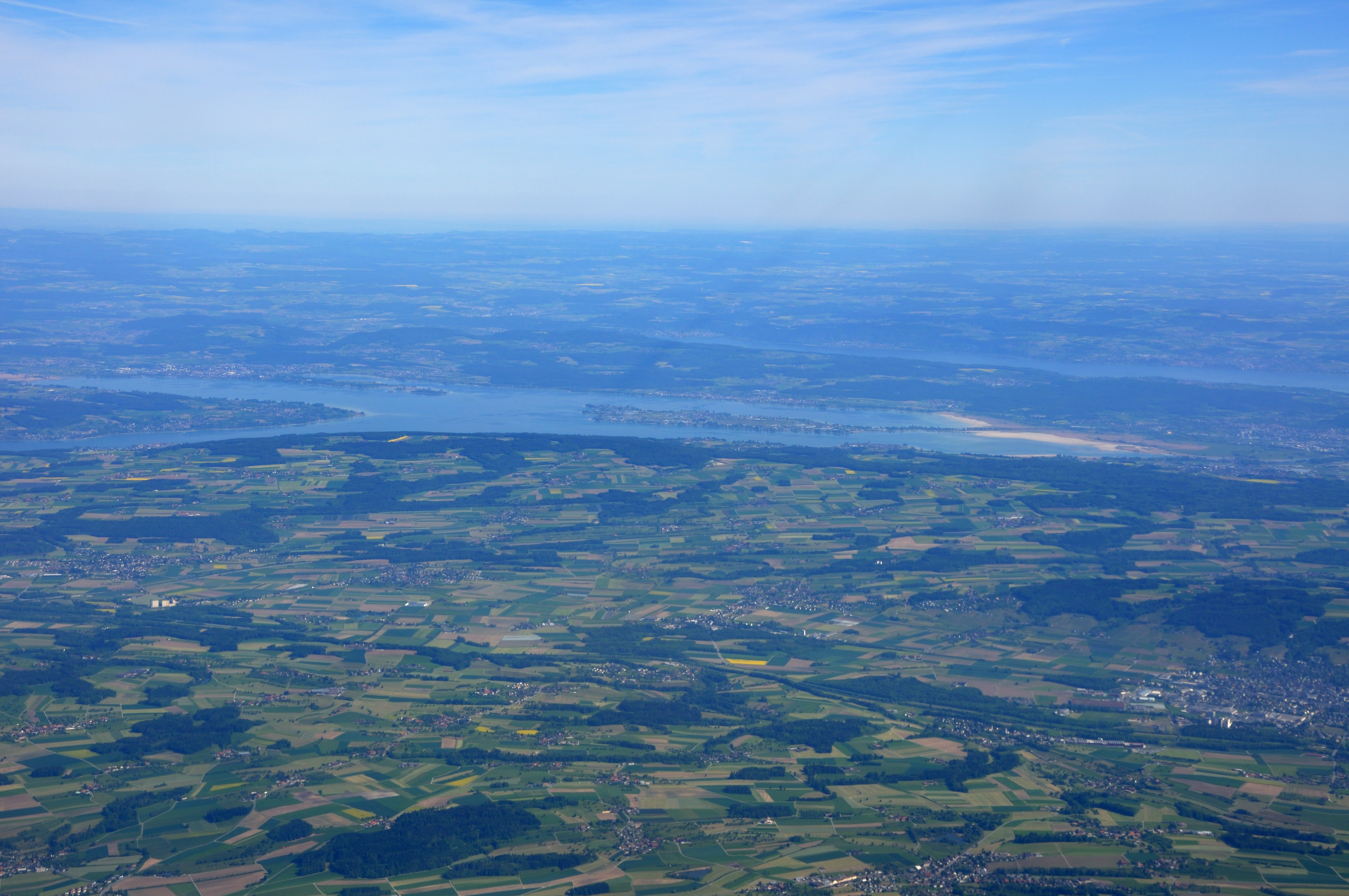
- View from an aeroplane above Rickenbach (CH) of the Untersee and the island of Reichenau (D) with Lake Überlingen (D), the northwestern part of the Obersee (D/CH/A) behind.

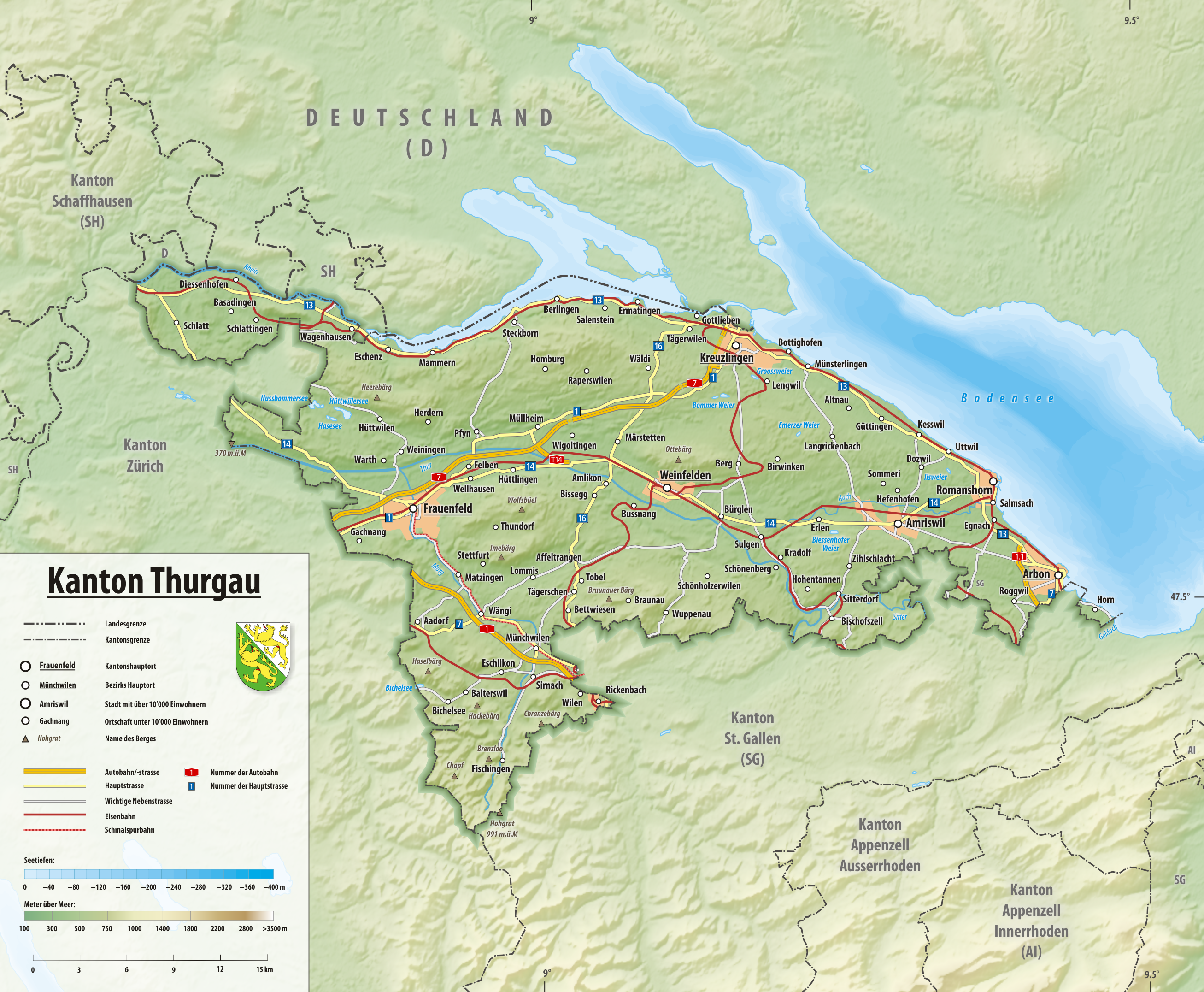
- Location within Baden-Württemberg Location within Germany Location within Canton of Schaffhausen Location within Canton of Thurgau Location within Switzerland Location within Alps
- Interactive map of Untersee
- Location: – Baden-Württemberg (Germany) – Cantons of Thurgau and Schaffhausen (Switzerland)
- Coordinates: 47°41′42″N 9°1′28″E
- Primary inflows: Seerhein, Radolfzeller Aach and smaller streams
- Primary outflows: High Rhine
- Surface area: 63 square kilometres (24 sq mi)
- Average depth: 13 metres (43 ft)
- Max. depth: 45 metres (148 ft)
- Water volume: 0.8 cubic kilometres (0.19 cu mi)
- Shore length^{1}: 87 kilometres (54 mi)
- Surface elevation: 395.11 metres (1,296.3 ft)
- Islands: Reichenau, the Werd islands
- Settlements: Radolfzell am Bodensee
- ^{1} Shore length is not a well-defined measure.

The Untersee (German pronunciation: [ˈʊntɐzeː], lit. 'Lower Lake'), also known as Lower Lake Constance, is the smaller of the two lakes that together form Lake Constance. The boundary between Switzerland and Germany runs through it. The lake surrounds several islands, the largest being Reichenau Island.

== Geography ==
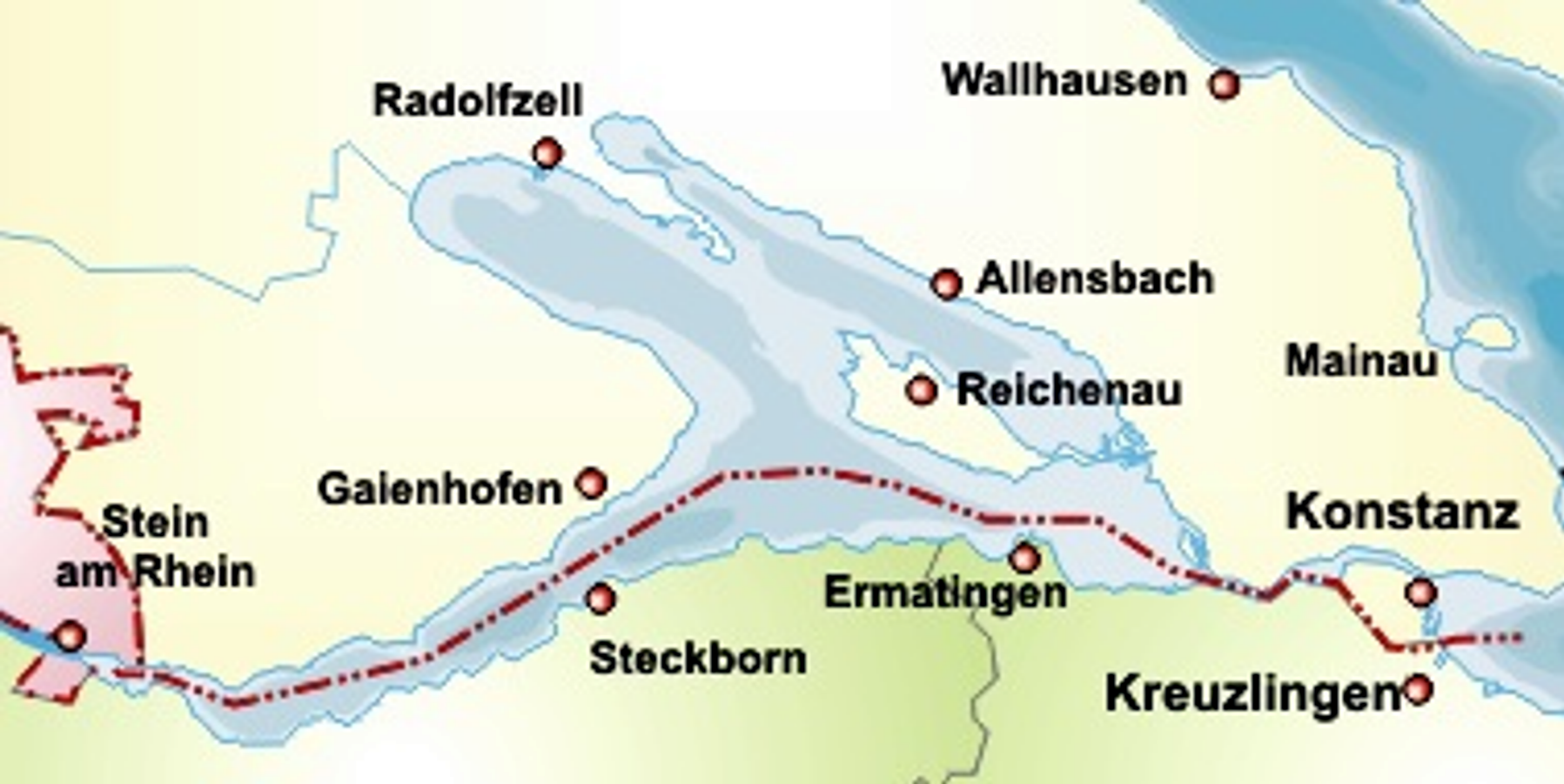
Map showing the Untersee. To the East, the Seerhein and parts of the Obersee are visible. Yellow: German state of Baden-Württemberg, green: Swiss canton of Thurgau, red: Swiss Canton of Schaffhausen, red line: Germany–Switzerland border

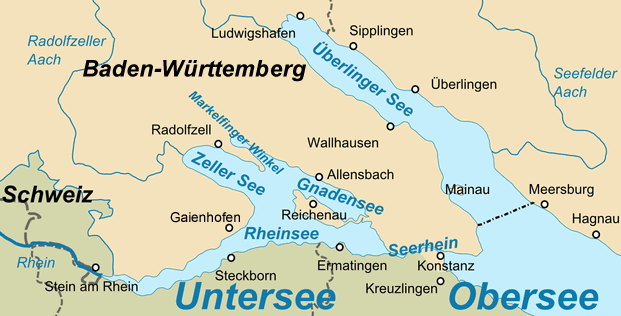
Map of Untersee with the different parts of the lake

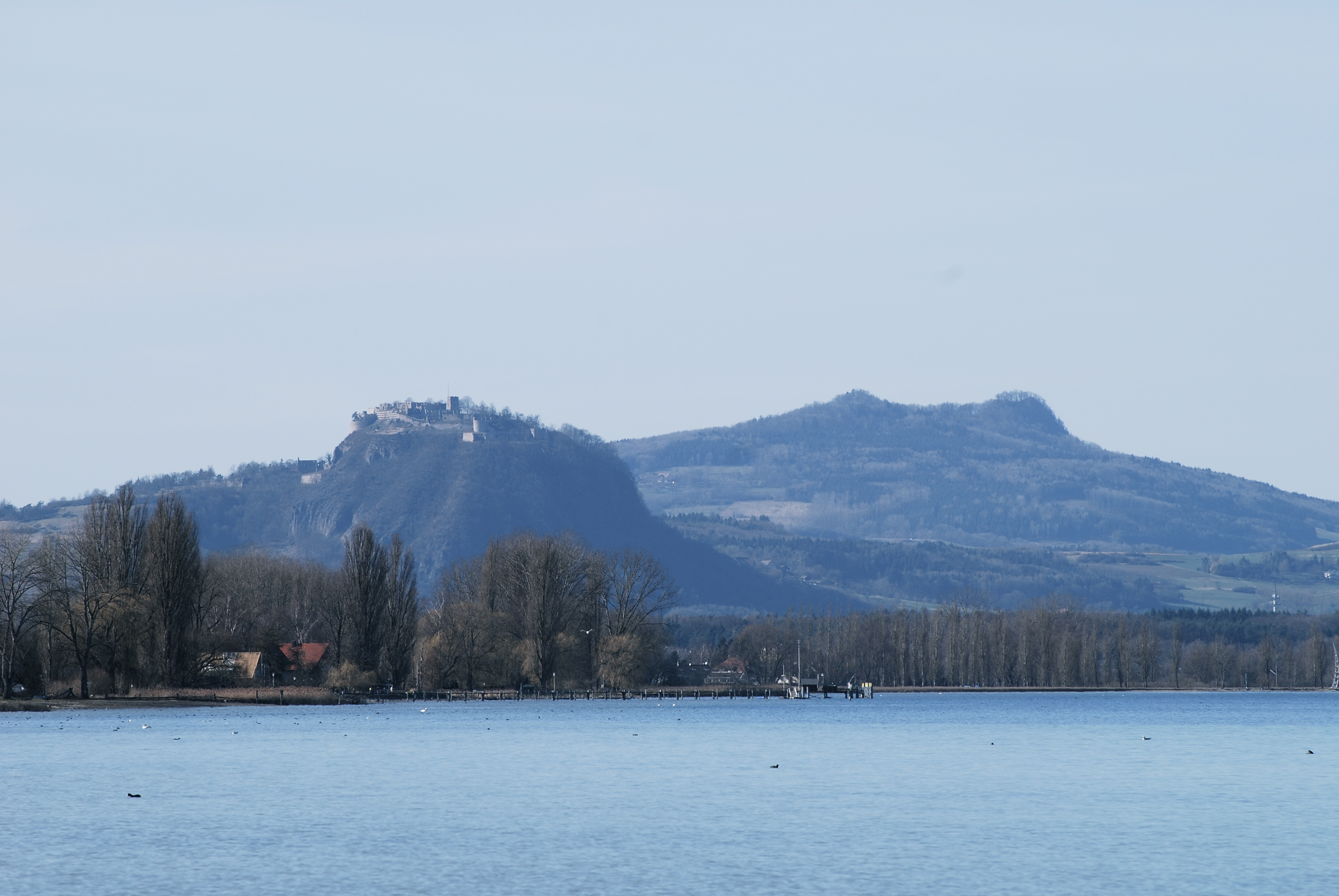
Extinct Hegau volcanoes Hohentwiel (front) and Hohenstoffeln (back) and Zeller See

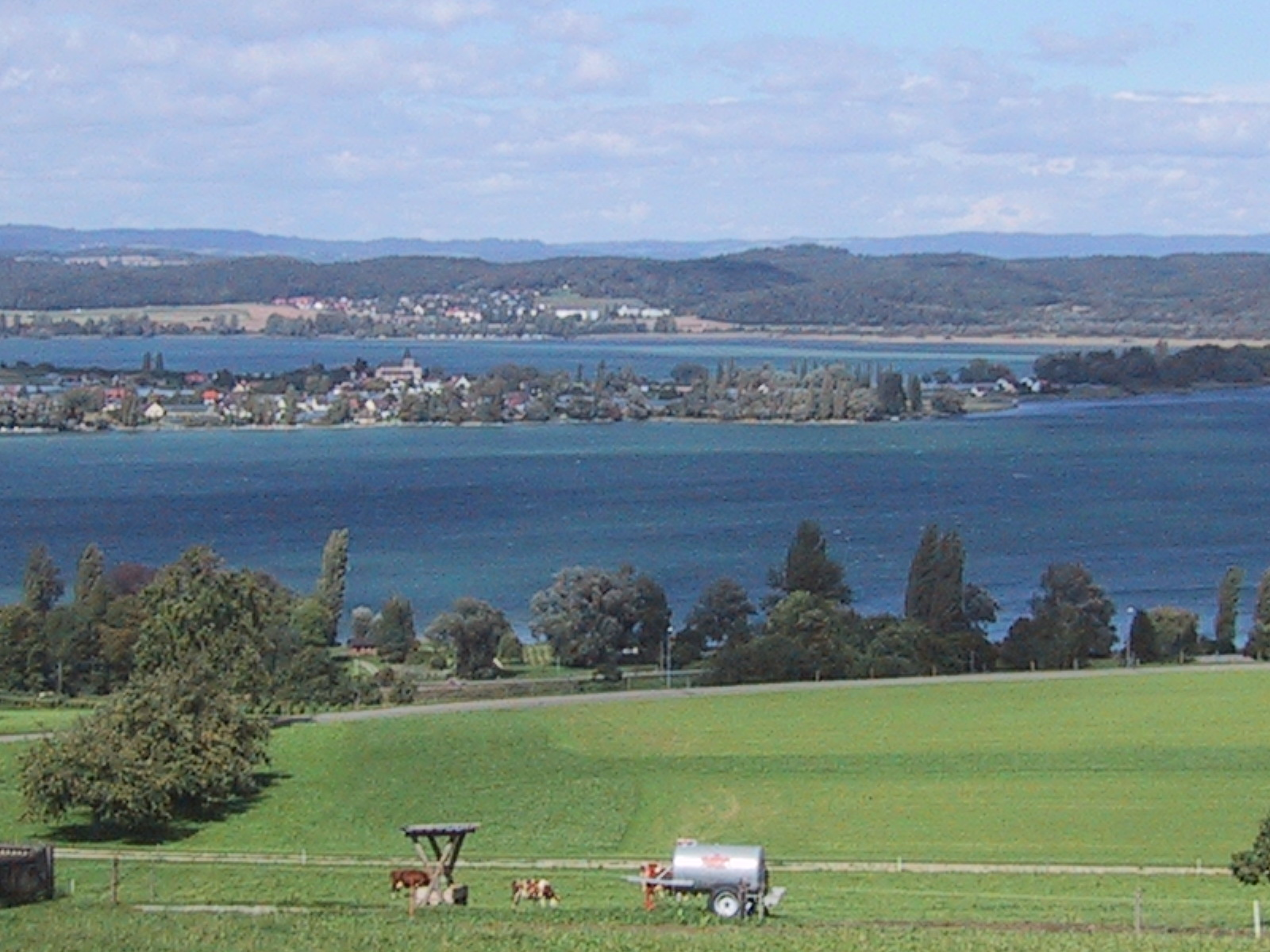
The Island of Reichenau, as seen from the Seerücken, with Rheinsee in the front and Gnadensee in the back

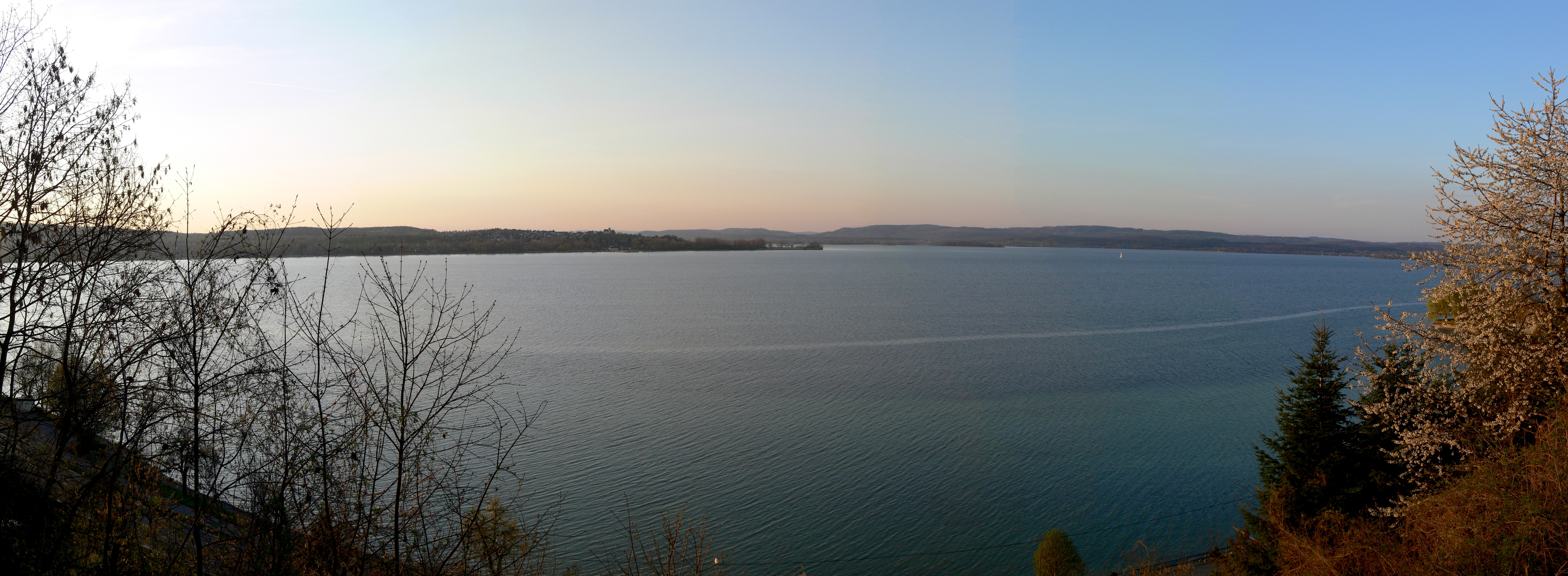
The Rheinsee near Berlingen

The Lower Lake Constance measures 63 km^{2} (24 sq mi) and is situated about 30 cm (12 in) lower than the Obersee. The Romans called it Lacus Acronius. In the Middle Ages, the Upper Lake was called Bodamicus Lacus, or Bodensee in German. At some point in time, this term began to include the Lower Lake, and a new term "Upper Lake" (in German: Obersee), was introduced for the larger lake.

The main tributaries are the Seerhein and Radolfzeller Aach. The source of the latter is the Aachtopf, a karst spring whose waters mainly derive from the Danube Sinkhole, making the Danube indirectly a tributary of Untersee and the Rhine, respectively.

The landscape surrounding the Untersee is very diverse. The Untersee contains two islands: Reichenau and Werd (near the transition to the High Rhine). In the northeast is the peninsula Bodanrück; in the northwest, the Hegau lowlands with the peninsula Mettnau; in the west, the peninsula Höri, with a mountain called Schiener Berg, and in the south, the Seerücken, which reaches more than 90 m (300 ft) feet above the Untersee near Berlingen.

Bordering the Lower Lake Constance are the Swiss cantons of Thurgau and Schaffhausen and the German state of Baden-Württemberg. In contrast to the Upper Lake, the border between Germany and Switzerland across the Lower Lake is well defined. Municipalities on the Swiss side are Gottlieben, Ermatingen, Salenstein, Berlingen, Steckborn, Mammern, Eschenz and Stein am Rhein. Municipalities on the German side are Öhningen, Gaienhofen, Moos am Bodensee, Radolfzell, Reichenau, Allensbach and Constance.

Three parts in the north of Lower Lake, surrounded by German territory, have names of their own: Zeller See (lit. 'Lake of Radolfzell'), Gnadensee (lit. 'Lake Mercy') and Markelfinger Winkel (lit. 'nook of Markelfingen'). The part in the south, which borders Switzerland, is called Rheinsee (lit. 'Rhine Lake').

=== Zeller See ===
The Zeller See is the part between the Mettnau peninsula in the north, the Höri peninsula in the south and the Island of Reichenau in the east. To the west lies the estuary of the Radolfzeller Aach and the Hegau. In the east, there is a small island called Liebesinsel (lit. 'Love Island') close to the Mettnau peninsula.

=== Gnadensee ===
The Gnadensee extends from Allensbach in the north and the Island of Reichenau in the south, from the tip of Mettnau in the west to the Reichenau causeway with its well-visible poplar avenue in the east. According to legend, the name Gnade (English: Mercy or Grace) of the lake comes from the time when the court house was located on the Island of Reichenau. If a defendant was sentenced to death, the execution of the sentence could not be carried out on the island, but only on the mainland because the island was "holy ground". Therefore, the condemned man was brought by boat to the mainland in the direction of Allensbach, where the sentence could be Gnade. Now, if the abbot wanted to pardon the condemned, he would ring a bell before the offender arrived on the other shore. This signaled to the executioner on the mainland, that prisoner had been pardoned. However, this story is unlikely to be true. A more probable theory is that the lake is named after Maria, "Our Lady of Mercy", as the church of the abbey on the island was dedicated to St. Mary and St. Mark. The town name Frauenfeld in neighbouring canton of Thurgau can be similarly explained.

=== Markelfinger Winkel ===
The Markelfingen Winkel is the western end of the Gnadensee, between Markelfingen in the north, Radolfzell in the west and the Mettnau peninsula in the south. Its eastern boundary is at the level of the summit Mettnauspitze. With its maximum water depth of 16 m, the Markelfingen Winkel is the shallowest part of the lake. It has a tributary: the Mühlbach, which drains the Mindelsee.

=== Rheinsee ===
The mainly Swiss section of the lake south of the Island of Reichenau and its southwestern arm is known as Rheinsee (lit. 'Lake Rhine'), not to be confused with Seerhein (lit. 'Rhine of the lake(s)'), which is the Upper and Lower Lakes connecting segment of the river Rhine). It is called the Seerhein because the current of the river follows exactly this path through the lake to the effluent of Lower Lake Constance in the Swiss town of Stein am Rhein, where the High Rhine starts. At the end of the lake, there are three small islands, called the Werd Islands. Where the Seerhein flows into the Rheinsee there is the island of Triboldingerbohl. There used to be another island called Entlibühl. The nature reserve Wollmatinger Ried is also located in this area. The border between Germany and Switzerland follows Rheinsee in east-west direction.

== Transport ==
The Schweizerische Schifffahrtsgesellschaft Untersee und Rhein (URh) offers regular boat trips on the Untersee and High Rhine between spring and autumn. The southern shore of Untersee is followed by the Lake Line and the eastern shore by the High Rhine Railway line, with several railway stations near the lake shore.

== See also ==
- Obersee (Lake Constance)
- Seerhein
- Bodanrück

== Bibliography ==
- Patrick Brauns, Wolfgang Pfrommer: Nature Hiking Guide Untersee. Nature guide to the unique cultural landscapes in the western Lake Constance area. (Hiking, biking, inline skating, canoeing, boat tours), Naturerbe-Verlag Resch, Überlingen, 1999, ISBN 3-931173-14-3.
