= Entlibühl =

Entlibühl (Äntebüel)
- Location within Switzerland Location within Canton of Thurgau

Geography
- Location: Untersee (Lake Constance)
- Coordinates: 47°39′57.1″N 09°06′59.3″E
- Adjacent to: Untersee, Lake Constance
- Area: 0.0011 km^{2} (0.00042 sq mi)
- Length: 0.070 km (0.0435 mi)
- Width: 0.025 km (0.0155 mi)

Administration
- Switzerland
- Canton: Thurgau

Entlibühl or Äntebüel, formerly also Koschmannskeller Kopf was a small island in the Untersee, part of Lake Constance. It lies around 30 metres (98 ft) off the Swiss shore below Gottlieben in the canton of Thurgau. The island is shown on historical maps by the Swisstopo from 1966 to 1995, off the western boundary of the municipality of Gottlieben with its former neighbour, Triboltingen (1975 incorporated into Ermatingen). From 2003 the name Äntebüel is found on the map in dark blue lettering surrounded by an enclosed isobar, i.e., designating a hydrographical object such as a shallows. A cytometric measurement of the former island gives a length from east to west of 70 metres (230 ft), a maximum width of 25 metres (82 ft) and an area of around 1,100 m^{2} (12,000 sq ft) or 0.11 hectares.

The name Äntebüel means 'bank in the water on which ducks like to rest'.

The island consisted mainly of sea chalk (Schnegglisand). In a 1911 publication it stated:

"The Schnegglisands are widely distributed in the Untersee. In the area of the lake they can also be found on the Langenrain. (by the Swiss shore!) opposite the islet of Entlibühl or Koschmannskeller Kopf, which at low tide forms an extensive bank of approx. 300 m length and 150 m width, and reaches up to the shore there. It lies in a thickness of 40-70 cm directly on the Seeletten [lake clay], its strata have a wave-like appearance. (Effect of the waves and the current.)"

== See also ==
- List of islands of Switzerland
