= Radolfzeller Aach =

River in Germany

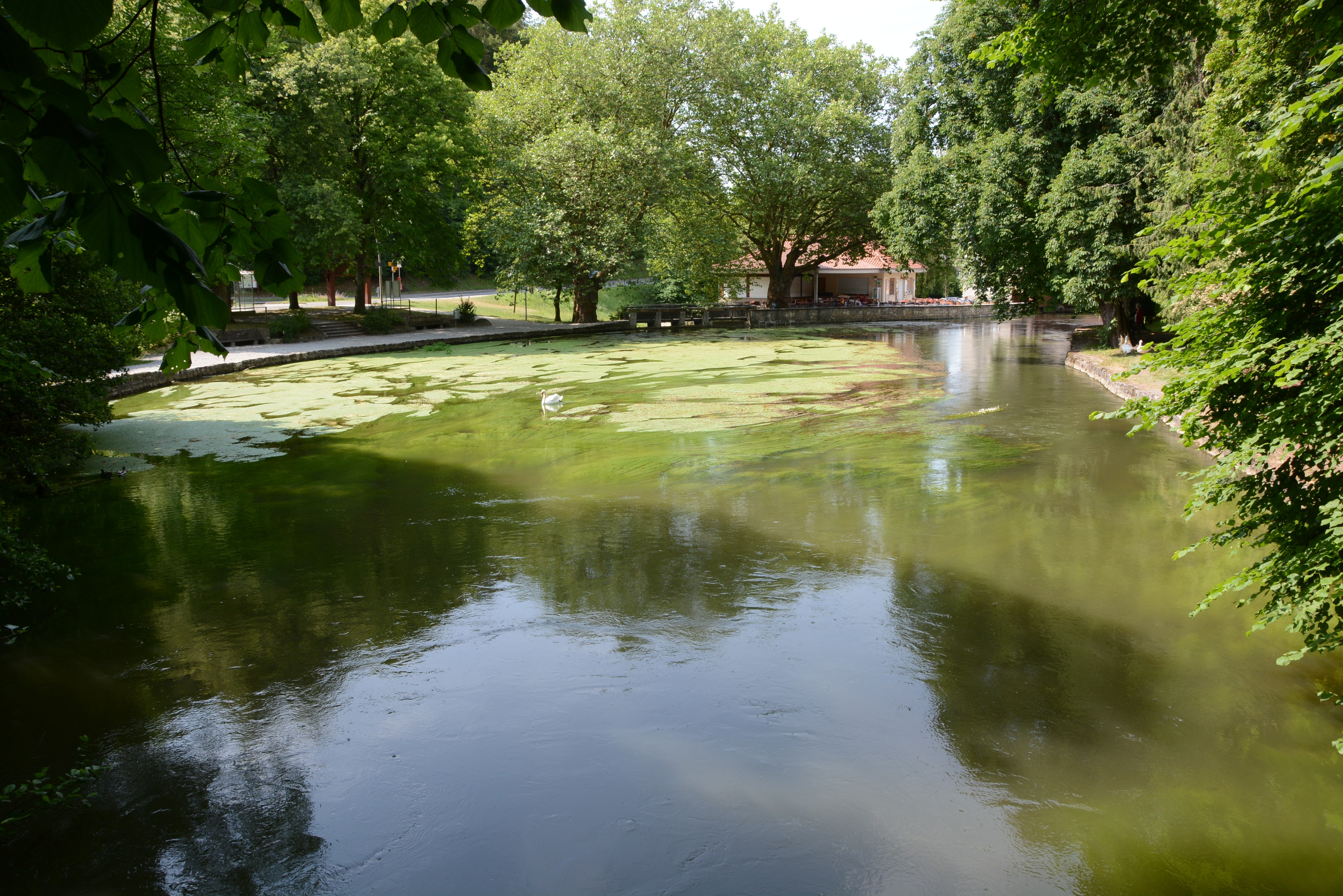
- Aachtopf, view from the Radolfzeller Aach source in the direction of the flow

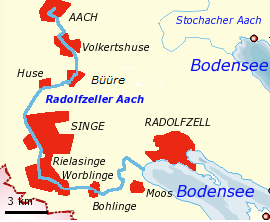
- Map, with place names in Alemannic

Location
- Country: Germany
- State: Baden-Württemberg
- District: Konstanz
- Cities: Radolfzell; Singen

Physical characteristics
- Source
  - location: Aachtopf in Aach
  - coordinates: 47°50′48″N 8°51′29″E
  - elevation: 475 m (1,558 ft)
- Mouth
  - location: into Untersee between Radolfzell and Moos
  - coordinates: 47°42′57″N 8°56′28″E
  - elevation: 395 m (1,296 ft)
- Length: 32.0 km (19.9 mi)
- Basin size: 255 km^{2} (98 sq mi)
- Discharge
  - average: 10 m^{3}/s (350 cu ft/s)

Basin features
- Progression: Rhine→ North Sea
- TVC: DE/2172

The Radolfzeller Aach (also known as Hegauer Aach) is a right or north tributary of the Rhine in the Hegau region, southern Baden-Württemberg (Germany). It is approximately 32 km (20 mi) long and drains into Lower Lake Constance. Most of its waters derive from the Danube river through the Danube Sinkhole.

== Course ==
The source of the river is the Aachtopf in Aach, the largest spring in Germany, at a height of 475 m above sea level. The water emerges from a karst cave. About two thirds of the water originates in the headwaters of the Danube. Between Immendingen and Möhringen an der Donau and in Fridingen, water from the Danube disappears underground (this is known as the Danube Sinkhole or Donauversinkung); this water reappears in the Aachtopf.

The river first flows through a number of nature reserves in the Hegau area. This segment of the river is known as Hegauer Aach. It then flows South to Singen, where it is known as Radolfzeller Aach. The last six kilometers of the lower course flow through a nature reserve called Radolfzeller Aach Ried. It flows into the northwestern part of Lake Untersee (the Zellersee) between Radolfzell and Moos. At the mouth, the average discharge is 10 m^{3}/s, making it the fourth largest contributor to Lake Constance.

== Catchment area ==
The Radolfzeller Aach drains a watershed of 255 km^{2}. If one includes the catchment area of the Danube upstream of the Danube Sinkhole (German: Donauversinkung), then the Radolfzell Aach drains an area of 1560 km^{2} on days when all of the Danube's water disappears into the Danube Sinkhole.

== Hydrology ==
In the past, the fast flowing water of the Radolfzeller Aach drove many watermills. Today, it drives several hydropower stations. In some areas, nature restoration projects are being carried out, for example in Beuren an der Aach, where the borough of Singen has set up a sediment catching facility, catching sediments and gravel carried by the river. Plans to release the sediments upstream of Volkertshausen were abandoned.

== Fauna ==
Several endangered species of waterfowl can be found at the Radolfzeller Aach, including snipe, sandpiper and green sandpiper. In the estuary, beavers established themselves in 1998, after having been absent for 200 years. Hydromorphologically, the Radolfzeller Aach is the lower end of trout and mullet territory. The dominant fish species in the Aach is the brown trout, as grayling are less shy and consequently more exposed to the feeding pressure of the large cormorant colony in the Radolfzeller Aach Ried. There are also noticeable stocks of some other endangered fish species, such as lamprey and European bullhead, who enjoy their protection close to the bottom of the river. In the lower reaches, we also find other species from Lake Constance.

== Communities ==
Villages on the Radolfzeller Aach include Aach, Volkertshausen, Beuren an der Aach, Friedingen, Hausen an der Aach, Singen, Rielasingen-Worblingen, Bohlingen and the Rickelshausen district of Radolfzell.

== Water sports ==
Canoeing is possible all year round, due to the strong Aachtopf spring. Canoeing in the section between Aachbad Singen and Bohlingen, however, is not advisable on account of the many water discharges and heavy industrialization. The lower reaches of the Aach are a nature preserve and closed to water sports year round.

== See also ==
- List of rivers of Germany
  - List of rivers of Baden-Württemberg
