= Mindelsee =

Lake in Germany

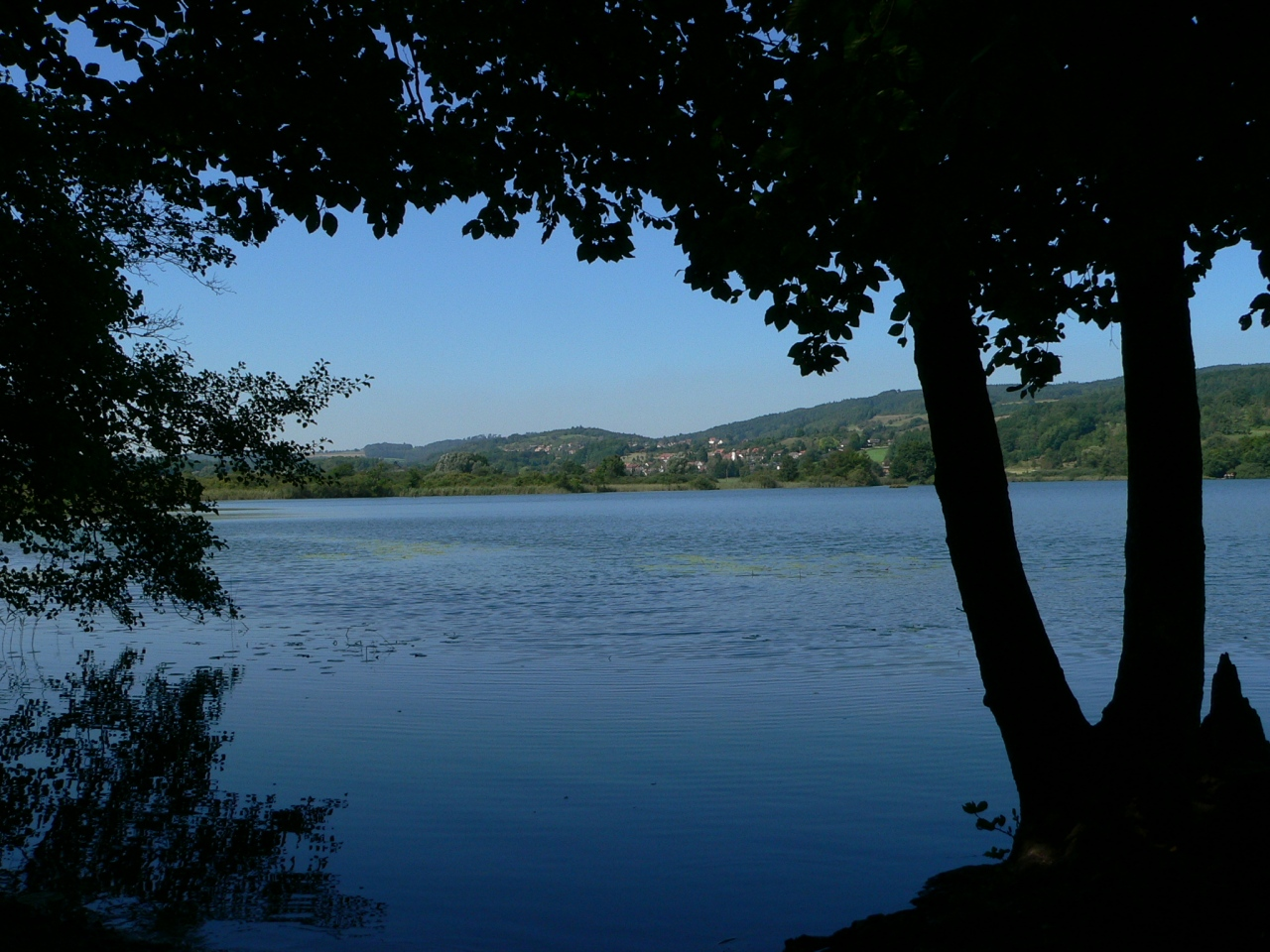

- Location within Baden-Württemberg
- Coordinates: 47°45′16″N 9°01′20″E
- Basin countries: Germany
- Surface area: 1.02 square kilometres (0.39 sq mi)
- Max. depth: 13.5 metres (44 ft)
- Surface elevation: 409 metres (1,342 ft)

The Mindelsee is a Proglacial lake in Radolfzell, Baden-Württemberg Germany. Its current area is approximately 115 hectares (280 acres) with an average depth of 8 metres (26 ft). it extends approximately 2,200 metres (1.4 mi) in a northwest-southeast direction with a width of around 570 metres (1,870 ft).

The lake is located on Bodanrück peninsula, which separates Upper Lake Constance from Lower Lake Constance.
