= Gnadensee =

Lake in Baden-Württemberg, Germany

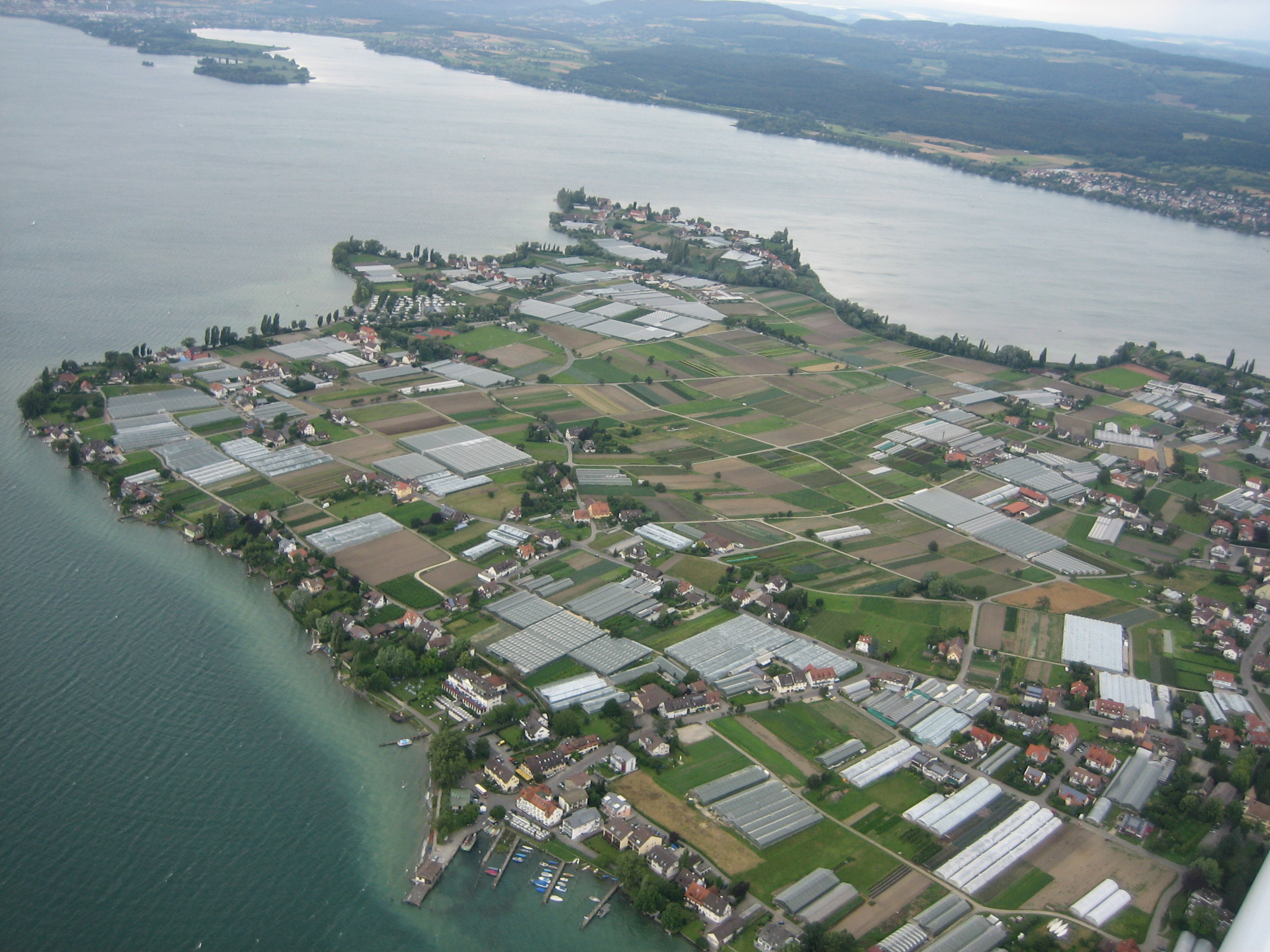
- In the upper part of the photograph the elongated Gnadensee runs towards the west and ends in the "Markelfinger Winkel"

- Location within Germany
- Location: Baden-Württemberg
- Coordinates: 47°42′30″N 09°03′30″E
- Primary inflows: Nägelriedgraben
- Primary outflows: Rheinsee
- Max. length: 11.1 kilometres (6.9 mi)
- Max. width: 1.9 kilometres (1.2 mi)
- Surface area: 13 kilometres (8.1 mi)^{2}
- Max. depth: 19 metres (62 ft)

The Gnadensee is part of Lower Lake Constance (German: Untersee), the western part of the lake.

== Description ==
The Gnadensee lies between Allensbach in the north and the island of Reichenau in the south. In the west it extends to the Mettnau peninsula (Radolfzell) and its eastern end borders on the Wollmatinger Ried Nature Reserve and the Reichenaudamm with its prominent avenue of poplars. The extremely small part in the northwest is called the Markelfinger Winkel. Together with the latter it has an area of 13 square kilometres. It reaches a maximum depth of 19 metres.

== Name ==
The name of the Gnadensee probably dates to the period when the local judiciary was based on the island of Reichenau. If an accused person was found guilty and sentenced to death, the execution could not take place on the island. It had to be carried out on the mainland as the whole island was holy ground. As a result, the convict was taken by boat to the mainland in the direction of present-day Allensbach, in order that the sentence could be carried out. If the local ruler, the abbot, wanted to reprieve the criminal, he had a bell rung before the boat reached the far shore. This was a signal to the executioner on the mainland that the convict had received a pardon or Gnade ("mercy" or "grace" in German).

Another explanation is that the name Gnadensee is derived from Mary, Mother of God, the "Lady of our Grace", and is an ellipsis of the word Gnaden[frau]see ("Lady of Grace Lake"), as the monastery in Mittelzell was dedicated to Saint Mary.
