= Markelfinger Winkel =

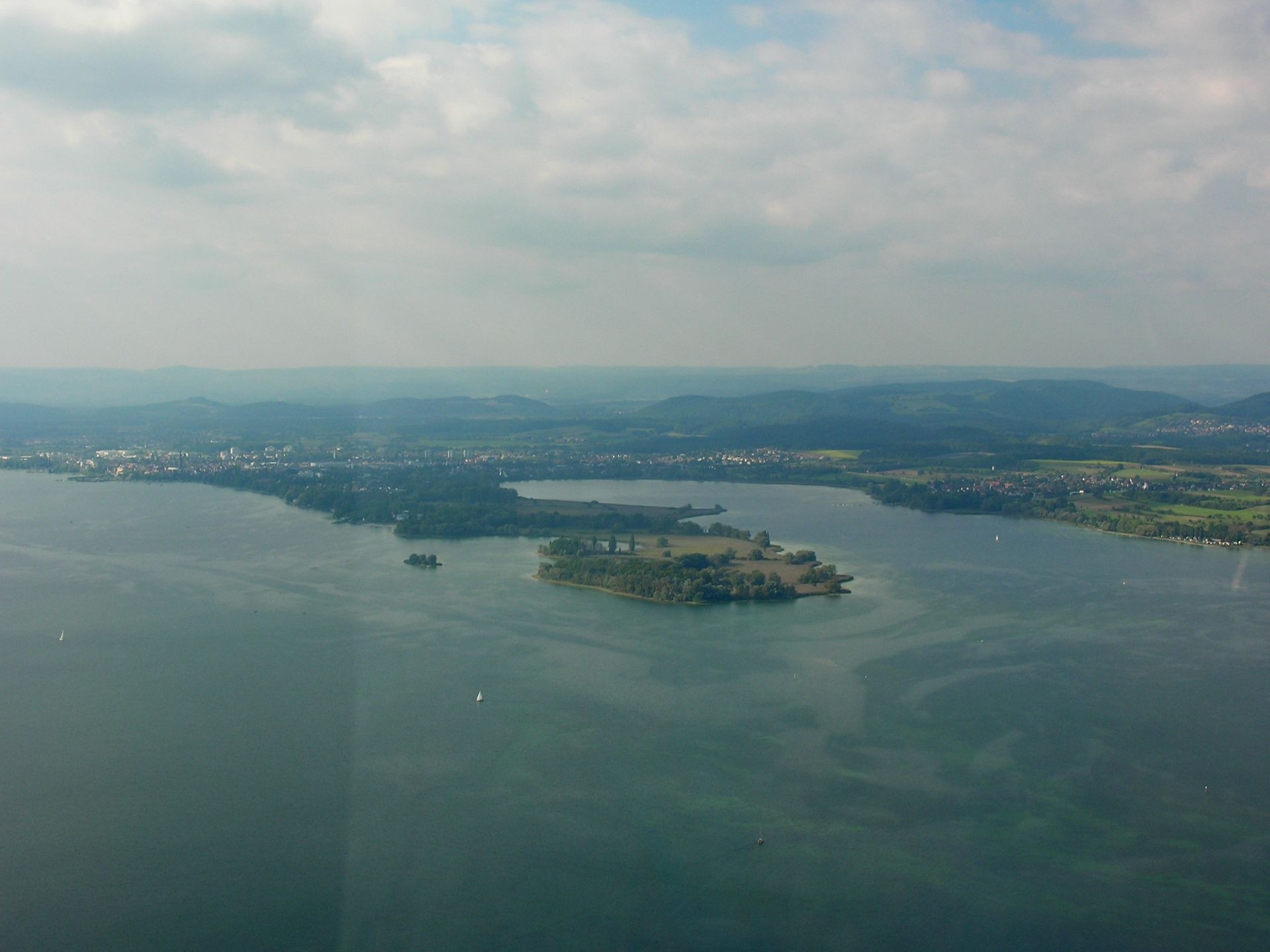
- Aerial photograph of the Gnadensee (with the Mettnau peninsula behind) and its continuation, the Markelfinger Winkel

- Location within Germany
- Location: Baden-Württemberg
- Coordinates: 47°44′17″N 08°59′40″E
- Primary inflows: Östlicher Sibach
- Primary outflows: Gnadensee
- Max. length: 1.44 kilometres (0.89 mi)
- Max. width: 0.98 kilometres (0.61 mi)
- Surface area: 1.06 kilometres (0.66 mi)^{2}
- Shore length^{1}: 4 kilometres (2.5 mi)
- ^{1} Shore length is not a well-defined measure.

The Markelfinger Winkel is the part of Lake Constance between the upper part of the Mettnau Peninsula and Markelfingen. It is the northwestern continuation of the Gnadensee and its parent lake, the Untersee ("Lower Lake Constance"). It has an area of around one square kilometre.
