= Wollmatinger Ried =

Naturschutzgebiet Wollmatinger Ried
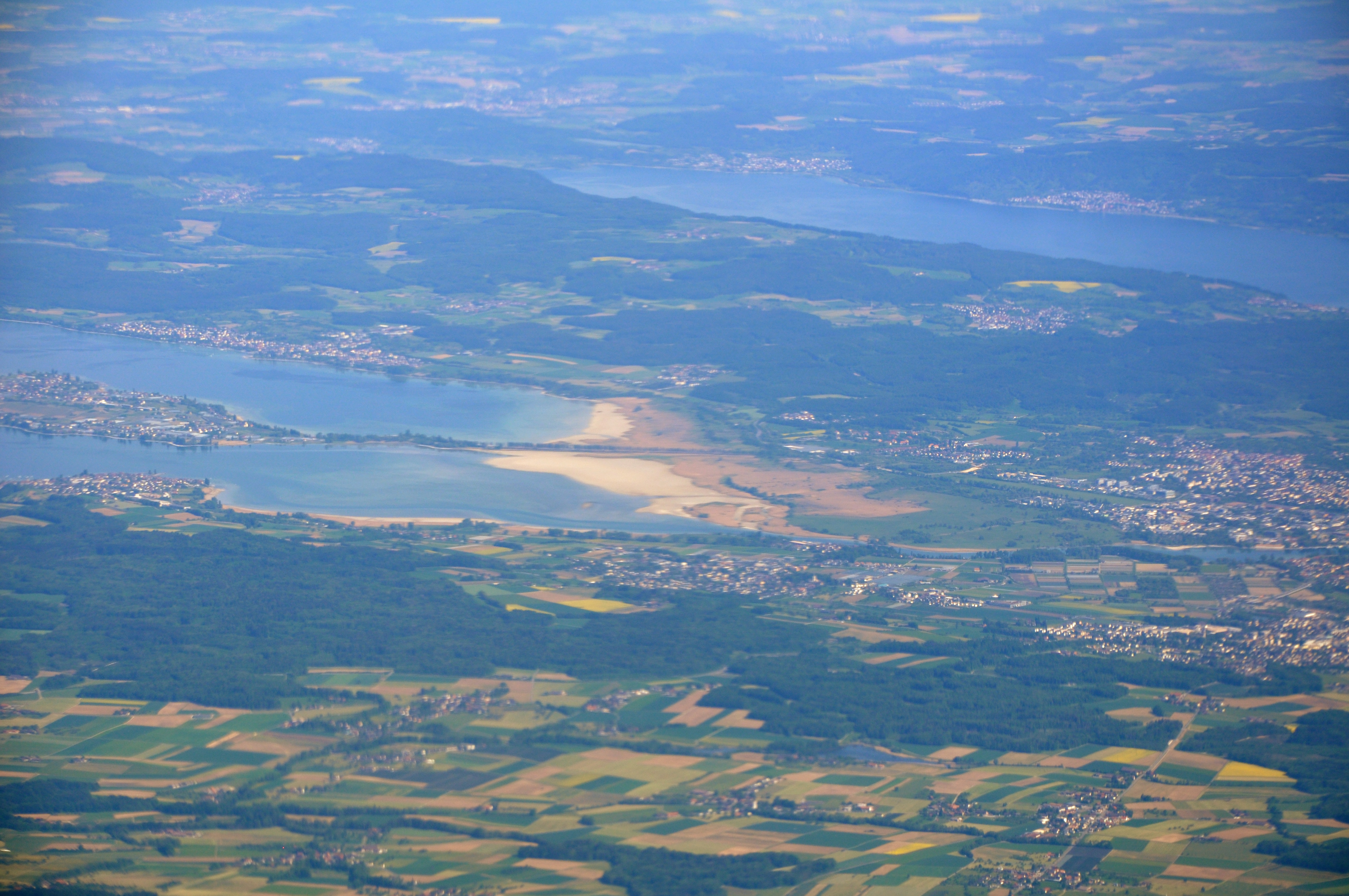
- Aerial photograph of the Wollmatinger Ried (centre)
- Interactive map of Naturschutzgebiet Wollmatinger Ried
- Nearest city: Konstanz
- Coordinates: 47°40′35″N 9°7′40″E
- Area: 7.67 km^{2} (2.96 sq mi)
- Established: 1930 / 1938

Ramsar Wetland
- Official name: Bodensee: Wollmatinger Ried - Giehrenmoos & Mindelsee
- Designated: 26 February 1976
- Reference no.: 89

The nature reserve of Wollmatinger Ried – Untersee – Gnadensee is a protected area on the shores of Lake Constance in Germany. It has an area of 767 hectares and is the largest and most important nature reserve on the German side of Lake Constance. It is rich in plant and animal species and extends from the banks of the Seerhein river west of Constance via the causeway to the Island of Reichenau in the Untersee to the eastern Gnadensee near Allensbach-Hegne. The nearby offshore islands of Triboldingerbohl (Langenrain) and Mittler or Langbohl (Kopf) are part of the reserve.

== Literature ==
- Bezirksstelle für Naturschutz und Landschaftspflege Freiburg (2004). Die Naturschutzgebiete im Regierungsbezirk Freiburg [The nature reserves in the administrative district of Freiburg] (2nd, rev. and exp. ed.). Ostfildern: Thorbecke. pp. 406–412. ISBN 978-3-7995-5174-8.

== Sources ==
- nabu-wollmatingerried.de: Das Wollmatinger Ried
- Regierungspräsidium Freiburg: Faltblatt zum Naturschutzgebiet Wollmatinger Ried
