= Eigeltingen =

- Municipality
- Coat of arms

- Location of Eigeltingen within Konstanz district
- Interactive map of Eigeltingen
- Location within Germany Location within Baden-Württemberg
- Coordinates: 47°51′33″N 08°53′51″E
- Country: Germany
- State: Baden-Württemberg
- Admin. region: Freiburg
- District: Konstanz

Government
  - Mayor (2023–31): Alois Fritschi (CDU)

Area
  - Total: 59.27 km^{2} (22.88 sq mi)
- Elevation: 483 m (1,585 ft)

Population (2025-12-31)
  - Total: 3,861
  - Density: 65.14/km^{2} (168.7/sq mi)
- Time zone: UTC+01:00 (CET)
  - Summer (DST): UTC+02:00 (CEST)
- Postal codes: 78253
- Dialling codes: 07774
- Vehicle registration: KN
- Website: www.eigeltingen.de

Eigeltingen (German pronunciation: [ˈaɪɡl̩tɪŋən]) is a municipality in the district of Konstanz in Baden-Württemberg in Germany.

== Notable people ==
- Siegfried Kauder (born 1950), German politician
