= Rielasingen-Worblingen =

- Municipality
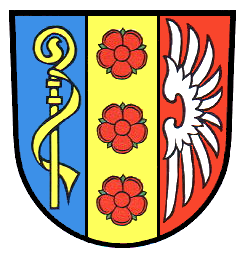
- Coat of arms

- Location of Rielasingen-Worblingen within Konstanz district
- Interactive map of Rielasingen-Worblingen
- Location within Germany Location within Baden-Württemberg
- Coordinates: 47°43′53″N 8°50′19″E
- Country: Germany
- State: Baden-Württemberg
- Admin. region: Freiburg
- District: Konstanz

Government
  - Mayor (2023–31): Ralf Baumert (SPD)

Area
  - Total: 18.57 km^{2} (7.17 sq mi)
- Elevation: 417 m (1,368 ft)

Population (2025-12-31)
  - Total: 12,353
  - Density: 665.2/km^{2} (1,723/sq mi)
- Time zone: UTC+01:00 (CET)
  - Summer (DST): UTC+02:00 (CEST)
- Postal codes: 78239
- Dialling codes: 07731
- Vehicle registration: KN
- Website: www.rielasingen-worblingen.de

Rielasingen-Worblingen is a municipality in the district of Konstanz, in Baden-Württemberg, Germany.

== Geography ==
Reilasingen-Worblingen is situated on the border with Switzerland, 4 km south of Singen, and 20 km east of Schaffhausen. The Radolfzeller Aach runs through the town.

== Town twinning ==
This town is twinned with the French town of Nogent-sur-Seine in the Aube department and the Italian city of Ardea.

== Structure ==
The Municipality is made out of the three villages of Rielasingen, Worblingen, Arlen and out of the two farms Rosenegg and Hittisheim.

== History ==
In the year 1936, Arlen became a part of Rielasingen, because Rielasingen had to cede over 129 hectares over to Singen, and as exchange they got the village of Arlen.

In the year 1975, the Municipality "Rielasingen-Worblingen formed by merging Rielasingen (with Arlen) and Worblingen.

== Arlen ==
In 1005, the formerly politically independent municipality of Arlen was first mentioned in documents as "Arola". When the St. Georgen Monastery was relocated from Hohentwiel to Stein am Rhein, the village of Arola was donated to St. Georgen Monastery by King Henry II. In the centuries that followed, the monastery owned most of the local property. From the 14th to the 16th century, the Lords of Klingenberg exercised the bailiwick rights they held as fiefs of the Archduchy of Austria in Arlen. In 1655, the town was part of the Lordship of Singen, which was pledged by the Archduchy of Austria to the Barons of Rost. After their extinction, the Lordship of Singen and Arlen passed to the Counts of Enzenberg in 1774. In 1810, Arlen fell to the Grand Duchy of Baden.

The first industrial settlement took place in 1834 with the founding of the “Baumwoll-Spinn & Weberei Arlen” by the entrepreneur Johann Hermann Ferdinand ten Brink (1810–1887), who was born in Amsterdam in the Netherlands . His parents, brothers and sisters lived in Boxtel at the time. This initiated an economic structural change, as a result of which agriculture in the area became increasingly less important. Over the next 150 years, the ten Brink family of entrepreneurs shaped Arlen and the Hegau not only economically, but also socially. Unusual for the time, the company paid allowances for working-class families with many children in addition to wages. In addition, it set up a support fund for disabled and elderly workers, workers’ houses with gardens, a company savings bank and what was probably the first company health insurance fund in all of southwest Germany. In addition, there were factory canteens, courses in healthy eating and a girls’ home (the so-called “Klösterle”) for single female workers in Arlen and Volkertshausen. In addition, the family founded various charitable institutions that benefited the entire population, including a sanatorium for tuberculosis patients, the Heinrich Hospital in Arlen, three kindergartens in Arlen, Rielasingen and Volkertshausen and the Bürgerschule as a secondary school in Rielasingen.

In 1936, Arlen's political independence ended with its forced incorporation into Rielasingen. The latter also had to cede over 129 hectares of municipal area to Singen am Hohentwiel.

== Rielasingen ==
In the district of Rielasingen, the most important evidence of human settlement dates back to the Hallstatt period . Burial mounds contained tools and jewelry from this cultural era. Two cemeteries, probably Alemannic, indicate that Rielasingen was an early settlement. The place was first mentioned in 1155 as "Villa Röleizingen" in a document from Emperor Barbarossa . The name probably derives from a personal name. The oldest and most important medieval landowners in Rielasingen included the monasteries of Reichenau and St. Georgen in Stein am Rhein . The Barons of Rosenegg were the fiefholders of the Reichenau estates and village lords . After their family died out in 1480, the lordship of Rosenegg and most of the village passed to the Counts of Lupfen . Their successors from 1582 onwards were the Barons of Mörsperg-Belfort. In 1610 Rielasingen finally came into the possession of the Bishop of Constance and belonged to the Bishopric of Constance until secularization in 1803. From that time on Rielasingen belonged to the Margraviate of Baden.

== Worblingen ==
The origins of Worblingen go back to the Alemannic period. The place name - derived from the personal name "Wormilo" - first appears in 1165 in an interest list of the Reichenau Monastery, which owned most of the town. From around 1300 to 1456 the Lords of Stein owned the Reichenau fiefdom of Worblingen. Then the knightly family of Klingenberg followed. From 1603 Worblingen was under the rule of the Lords of Dankenschweil. In 1611 Archilles of Dankenschweil had a castle built in the village to replace the one destroyed in 1499. The Barons of Liebenfels were the local lords until Worblingen was transferred to the Grand Duchy of Baden in 1806. As in Wangen, Gailingen and Randegg, also imperial knightly towns in the Hegau, numerous Jewssettled in Worblingen. A separate Jewish cemetery was established in 1857. In 1875 there were 95 Jewish citizens in the town.

As part of the municipal reform on January 1, 1975, the municipality of Worblingen merged with the neighboring municipality of Rielasingen to form the unified municipality of Rielasingen-Worblingen.
