= Triboldingerbohl =

Nickname: Langenrain
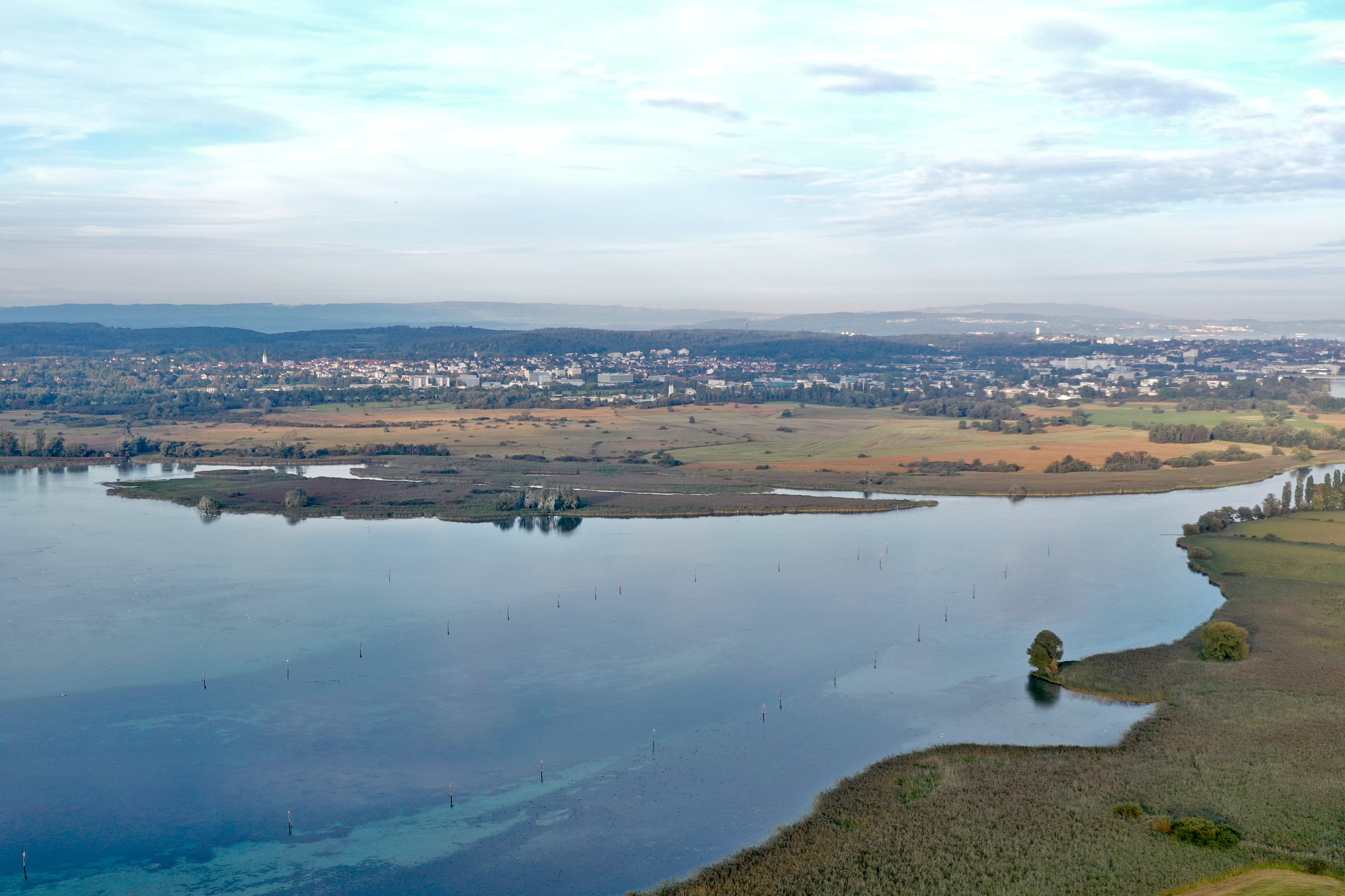
- The Triboldingerbohl at the transition from Seerhein (right) into Untersee, Constance in the background.
- Interactive map of Triboldingerbohl

Geography
- Location: Untersee (Lake Constance)
- Coordinates: 47°40′18″N 9°7′21″E
- Area: 0.13557 km^{2} (0.05234 sq mi)
- Area rank: 4th
- Length: 0.78 km (0.485 mi)
- Width: 0.23 km (0.143 mi)

Administration
- Germany
- Land: Baden-Württemberg
- Landkreis: Konstanz
- City: Constance

Demographics
- Population: 0

Triboldingerbohl, also known as Triboltingen or großes Bohl or Langenrain, is the fourth largest island of Lake Constance, with an area of 0.13557 square kilometres (0.05234 sq mi). It is 780 meters (2,560 ft) long and up to 230 meters (750 ft) wide. It is located in the easternmost part of the Untersee (Lake Constance), near the point where the Seerhein flows into the lake. This part of the lake is also known as the Rheinsee. It belongs to the Wollmatinger Ried nature conservation area; administratively it belongs to the district industrial area of the City of Constance. Until 1934, it belonged to the municipality of Wollmatingen, which was then annexed by Constance. Triboldingerbohl lies 2.1 km (1.3 mi) southeast of Reichenau Island and 1.6 km (0.99 mi) from the dam that connects Reichenau to the mainland. The area between Triboldingerbohl island and the Reichenau dam is called Ermatinger pool and is an ecologically important shallow-water zone.

Triboldingerbohl is uninhabited. It is a bird sanctuary. It takes its name from the former Swiss municipality Triboltingen, which was located on the southern shore of Lake Untersee. Between Triboldingerbohl and the mainland lies the smaller island of Mittler Bohl, also known as Langbohl. The two islands are separated by a channel which is only 30 to 50 meters (98 to 164 ft) wide. This channel and the channel separating Langbohl from the mainland are collectively known as Schläuche ("tubes").

Both island are covered with reeds. They consist of a several meters thick layer of Schnegglisand, a calcareous deposits from Blue-green algae), which is covered by a layer of humus.

Although the island is uninhabited, it is listed in the Constance street directory. It falls under postal code 78467 (Constance-Wollmatingen).
