= Volkertshausen =

- Municipality
- Coat of arms

- Location of Volkertshausen within Konstanz district
- Interactive map of Volkertshausen
- Location within Germany Location within Baden-Württemberg
- Coordinates: 47°49′17″N 08°52′02″E
- Country: Germany
- State: Baden-Württemberg
- Admin. region: Freiburg
- District: Konstanz

Government
  - Mayor (2019–27): Marcus Röwer

Area
  - Total: 5.15 km^{2} (1.99 sq mi)
- Elevation: 443 m (1,453 ft)

Population (2025-12-31)
  - Total: 3,332
  - Density: 647/km^{2} (1,680/sq mi)
- Time zone: UTC+01:00 (CET)
  - Summer (DST): UTC+02:00 (CEST)
- Postal codes: 78269
- Dialling codes: 07774
- Vehicle registration: KN
- Website: www.volkertshausen.de

Volkertshausen is a town in the district of Konstanz in Baden-Württemberg, Germany.

== Twin towns ==
Volkertshausen is twinned with:

- Bolsena, Italy
- Schönau-Berzdorf, Germany
