= Orsingen-Nenzingen =

- Municipality
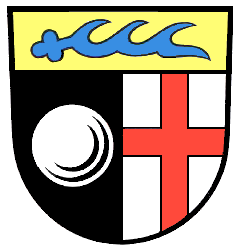
- Coat of arms

- Location of Orsingen-Nenzingen within Konstanz district
- Interactive map of Orsingen-Nenzingen
- Location within Germany Location within Baden-Württemberg
- Coordinates: 47°50′8″N 8°55′59″E
- Country: Germany
- State: Baden-Württemberg
- Admin. region: Freiburg
- District: Konstanz
- Subdivisions: 2

Government
  - Mayor (2021–29): Stefan Keil

Area
  - Total: 22.23 km^{2} (8.58 sq mi)
- Elevation: 444 m (1,457 ft)

Population (2025-12-31)
  - Total: 3,573
  - Density: 160.7/km^{2} (416.3/sq mi)
- Time zone: UTC+01:00 (CET)
  - Summer (DST): UTC+02:00 (CEST)
- Postal codes: 78359
- Dialling codes: 07771, 07774
- Vehicle registration: KN
- Website: www.orsingen-nenzingen.de

Orsingen-Nenzingen (German pronunciation: [ˈɔʁzɪŋən ˈnɛntsɪŋən]) is a municipality in the district of Konstanz in Baden-Württemberg in Germany.

== Points of interest ==
- Langenstein Castle with golf course and carnival museum
