= Konstanz (district) =

Coordinates: 47°49′N 8°53′E

- District
- Flag Coat of arms
- Country: Germany
- State: Baden-Württemberg
- Adm. region: Freiburg
- Capital: Konstanz

Government
  - District admin.: Zeno Danner

Area
  - Total: 817.95 km^{2} (315.81 sq mi)

Population (31 December 2022)
  - Total: 292,568
  - Density: 360/km^{2} (930/sq mi)
- Time zone: UTC+01:00 (CET)
  - Summer (DST): UTC+02:00 (CEST)
- Vehicle registration: KN, STO and BÜS
- Website: www.lrakn.de

Konstanz (or Constance) is a Landkreis (district) in the south of Baden-Württemberg on the German-Swiss border, situated along the shores of Lake Constance. Neighboring districts are (from west clockwise) Schwarzwald-Baar, Tuttlingen, Sigmaringen and Bodenseekreis. To the south it borders the Swiss cantons of Zurich, Thurgau and Schaffhausen. The municipality of Büsingen am Hochrhein is an exclave of Germany surrounded by Swiss territory.

== History ==
The district dates back to the Bezirksamt Konstanz, which was created in 1806 when the area became part of Württemberg (since 1810 Baden). After some changes in its outline it was changed into the district in 1936, including part of the dissolved Bezirksamt Engen. 1939 the city Constance became district-free, but was reintegrated into the district in 1953. 1973 it was merged with the neighboring district Stockach and some municipalities from the districts Sigmaringen and Donaueschingen.

== Geography ==
The district is located at the north-western shore of Lake Constance, in a landscape called Hegau. The World Heritage Site Reichenau Island, with its old monastery as well as the flower island Mainau, are part of the district. Also located in the district is the Aachtopf near the city Aach, the biggest spring in Germany by water volume. The spring actually contains water from the Danube which moves through karst caves underneath the European watershed.

== Coat of arms ==
District banner of Konstanz

The coat of arms show a fish both in top left as well as the bottom right, representing the fishing industry in the Lake Constance. The cross in the top right is the symbol of the bishopric of Konstanz. The deer antlers in the bottom left were added after the district was merged with the district Stockach. These were taken from the coat of arms of the Counts of Veringen-Nellenbach, and were present in the coat of arms of the district Stockach, as well as the city Stockach.

== Cities and Towns ==
Clickable map of towns and municipalities in the district

Cities	Towns
1. Aach (2296); 2. Engen (10.796); 3. Konstanz (84.760); 4. Radolfzell (Bodensee) (31.203); 5. Singen (47.723); 6. Stockach (17.114); 7. Tengen (4584)	1. Allensbach (7087); 2. Bodman-Ludwigshafen (4655); 3. Büsingen am Hochrhein (1491); 4. Eigeltingen (3843); 5. Gaienhofen (3480); 6. Gailingen am Hochrhein (2852); 7. Gottmadingen (10.656); 8. Hilzingen (8754); 9. Hohenfels (2038); 10. Moos (3243); 11. Mühlhausen-Ehingen (3873); 12. Mühlingen (2482); 13. Öhningen (3671); 14. Orsingen-Nenzingen (3519); 15. Reichenau (5307); 16. Rielasingen-Worblingen (11.946); 17. Steißlingen (4838); 18. Volkertshausen (3114)
Administrative districts	1. Allensbach (7087); 2. Bodman-Ludwigshafen (4655); 3. Büsingen am Hochrhein (1491); 4. Eigeltingen (3843); 5. Gaienhofen (3480); 6. Gailingen am Hochrhein (2852); 7. Gottmadingen (10.656); 8. Hilzingen (8754); 9. Hohenfels (2038); 10. Moos (3243); 11. Mühlhausen-Ehingen (3873); 12. Mühlingen (2482); 13. Öhningen (3671); 14. Orsingen-Nenzingen (3519); 15. Reichenau (5307); 16. Rielasingen-Worblingen (11.946); 17. Steißlingen (4838); 18. Volkertshausen (3114)
1. Engen; 2. Gottmadingen; 3. Höri; 4. Konstanz; 5. Singen; 6. Stockach	1. Allensbach (7087); 2. Bodman-Ludwigshafen (4655); 3. Büsingen am Hochrhein (1491); 4. Eigeltingen (3843); 5. Gaienhofen (3480); 6. Gailingen am Hochrhein (2852); 7. Gottmadingen (10.656); 8. Hilzingen (8754); 9. Hohenfels (2038); 10. Moos (3243); 11. Mühlhausen-Ehingen (3873); 12. Mühlingen (2482); 13. Öhningen (3671); 14. Orsingen-Nenzingen (3519); 15. Reichenau (5307); 16. Rielasingen-Worblingen (11.946); 17. Steißlingen (4838); 18. Volkertshausen (3114)
