= Allensbach =

- Municipality
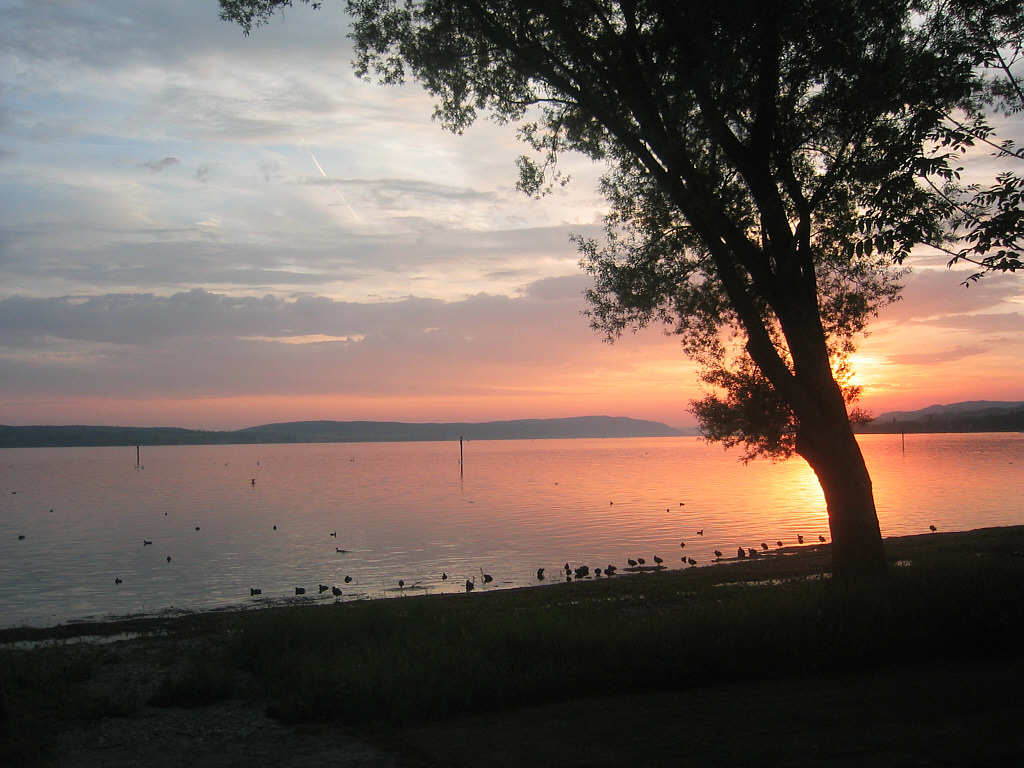
- Sunset over Lake Constance

- Coat of arms

- Location of Allensbach within Konstanz district
- Interactive map of Allensbach
- Location within Germany Location within Baden-Württemberg
- Coordinates: 47°42′55″N 9°4′17″E
- Country: Germany
- State: Baden-Württemberg
- Admin. region: Freiburg
- District: Konstanz
- Subdivisions: 4

Government
  - Mayor (2023–31): Stefan Friedrich

Area
  - Total: 26.53 km^{2} (10.24 sq mi)
- Elevation: 400 m (1,300 ft)

Population (2025-12-31)
  - Total: 7,299
  - Density: 275.1/km^{2} (712.6/sq mi)
- Time zone: UTC+01:00 (CET)
  - Summer (DST): UTC+02:00 (CEST)
- Postal codes: 78476
- Dialling codes: 07533
- Vehicle registration: KN
- Website: www.allensbach.de

Allensbach (German pronunciation: [ˈalənsbax]) is a municipality in the district of Konstanz in Baden-Württemberg in Germany.

Allensbach is located between Konstanz and Radolfzell on Lake Constance.

== Notable institution ==
Allensbach is known for being the home of the Institut für Demoskopie Allensbach (also known as Allensbach Institute), one of the best known opinion-polling organizations in Germany.

== World heritage site ==
It is home to one or more prehistoric pile-dwelling (or stilt house) settlements that are part of the, added in 2011, Prehistoric Pile dwellings around the Alps UNESCO World Heritage Site.
