= Mettnau =

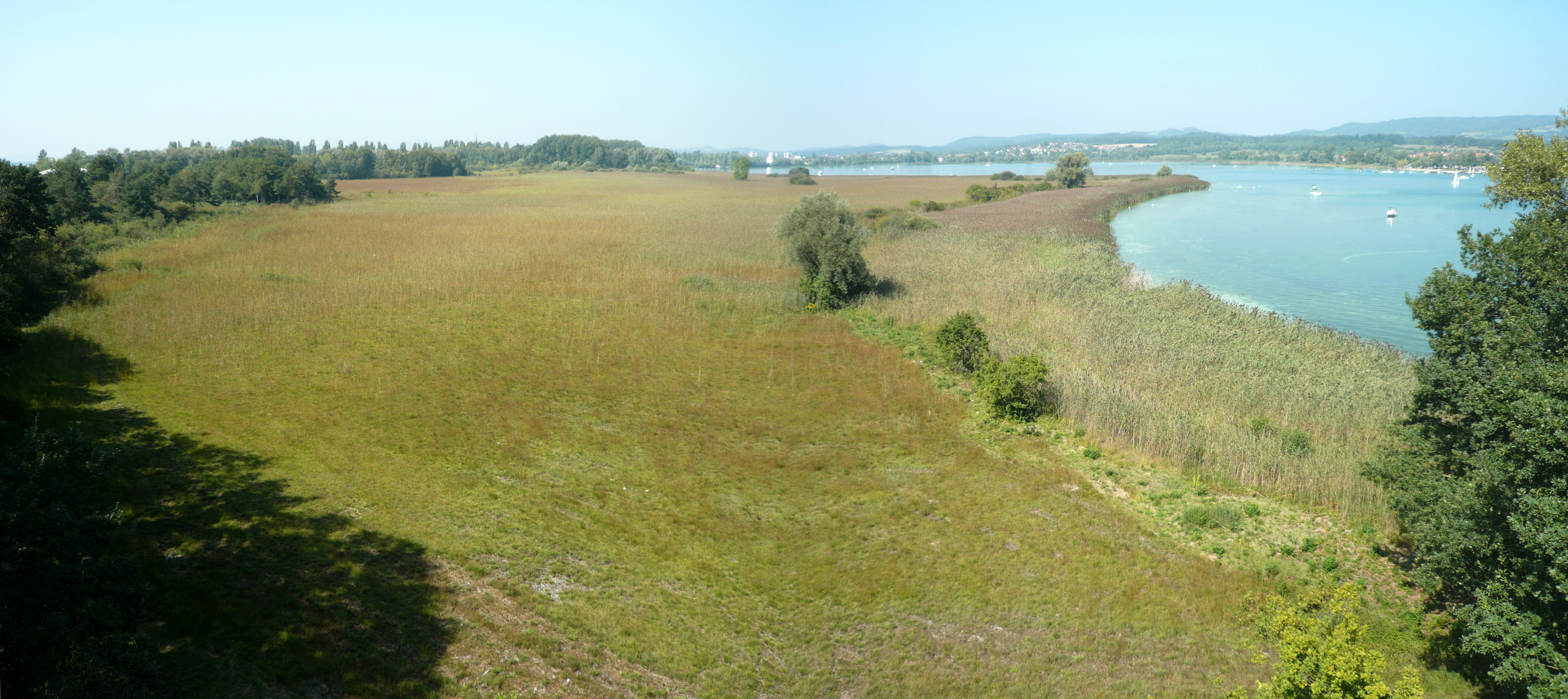

- Location within Baden-Württemberg
- Location: Radolfzell, Germany
- Coordinates: 47°43′50″N 8°59′50″E
- Area: 1.4 square kilometres (0.54 sq mi)
- Established: 1926

Mettnau is a peninsula, located east of the town of Radolfzell in the western part of Lake Constance. It lies between the Markelfingen corner in the north and the Zeller See in the south and has a length of 3.5 kilometers and a width of up to 800 meters, a size of 140 hectares.

A large part of the peninsula is a nature reserve. The Nature Reserve Mettnau includes a small island name Love Island. It is managed by Naturschutzbund Deutschland on behalf of the Regierungsbezirk of Freiburg. A spa is located on the island, and a field station of the Bird observatory Radolfzell.

== Nature Reserve ==
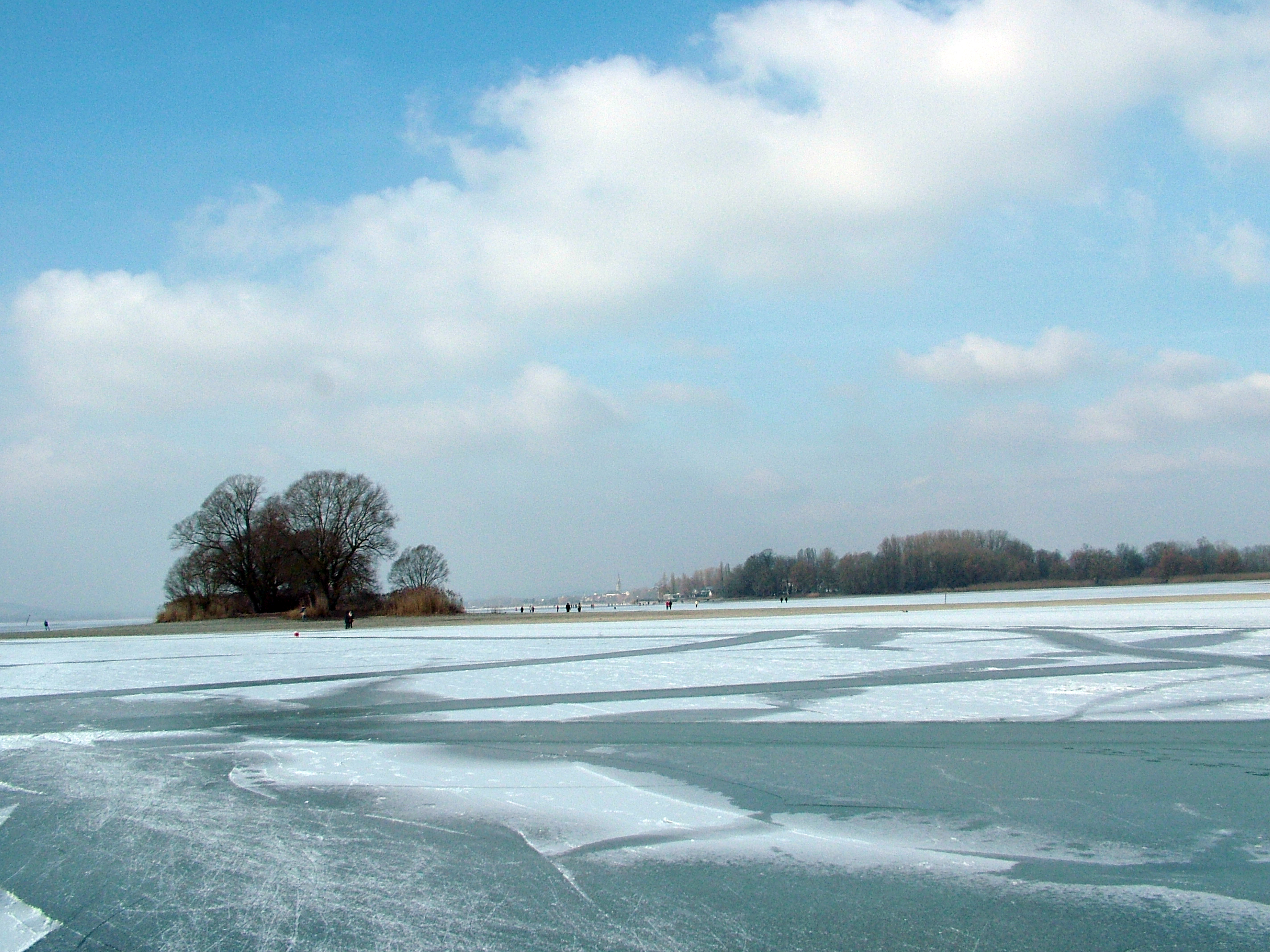
Mettnau and offshore Love Island in the winter; in the background Radolfzell

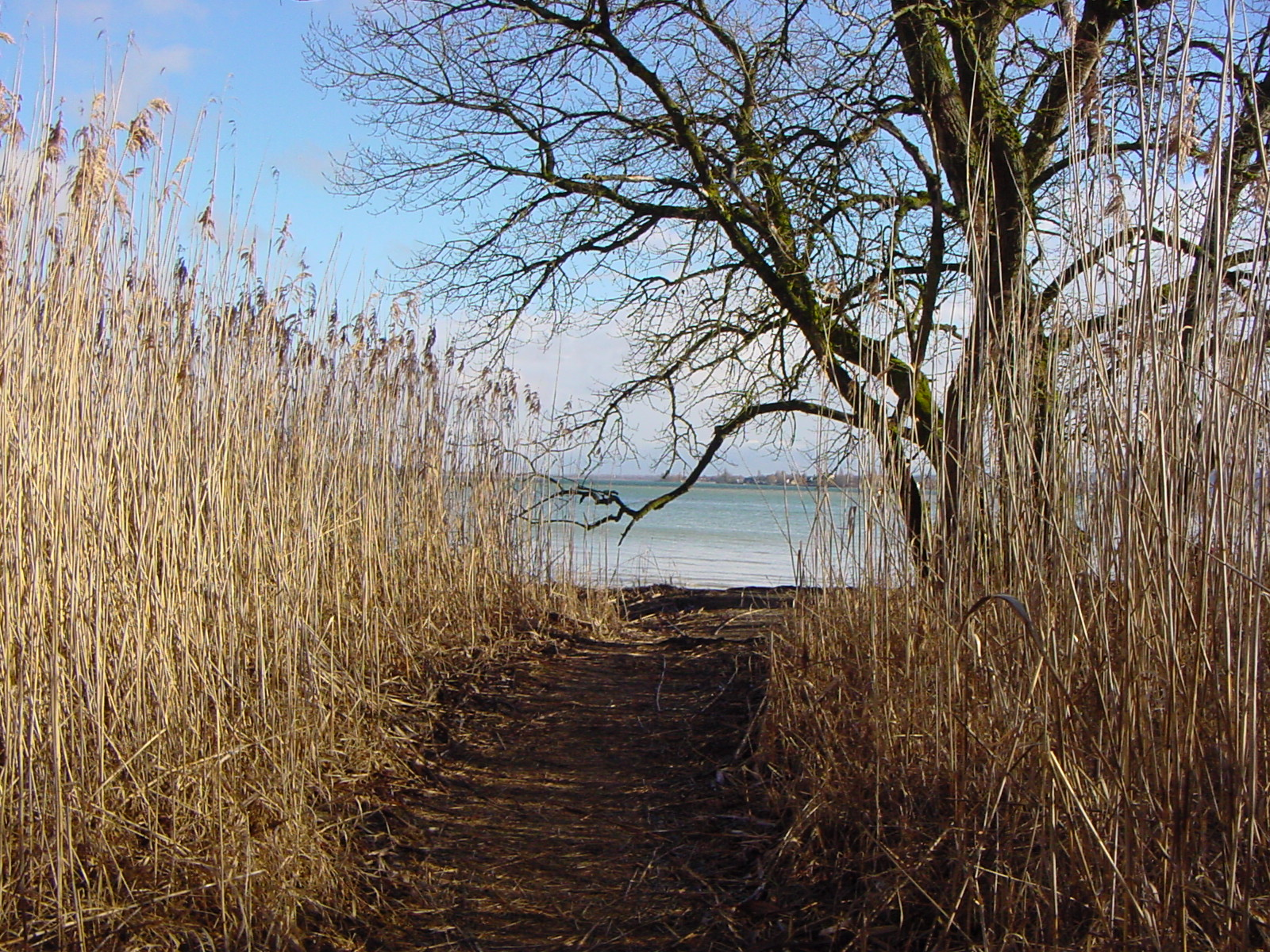
eastern tip of the Mettnau peninsula

The nature reserve of Mettnau was established in 1926 by the town of Radolfzell, but only expanded to its current size of 140 hetctaresin 1984. A pond was accidentally created when the peninsula was used as a landfill. The pond is independent of fluctuations in the water of Lake Constance, making it an attractive place for hatching ducks. It is close to the nutrient-rich shallow-water zones of Markelfingen corner, which provides food for the ducks and their offspring.

== See also ==
- List of peninsulas

== References and sources ==
- Peter Berthold, Karl Mühl and Siegfried Schuster: Naturschutzgebiet Halbinsel Mettnau: Geschichte - Natur - Landschaft, Ornithologische Arbeitsgemeinschaft Bodensee, Constance, 1979
