= Bonndorf Graben =

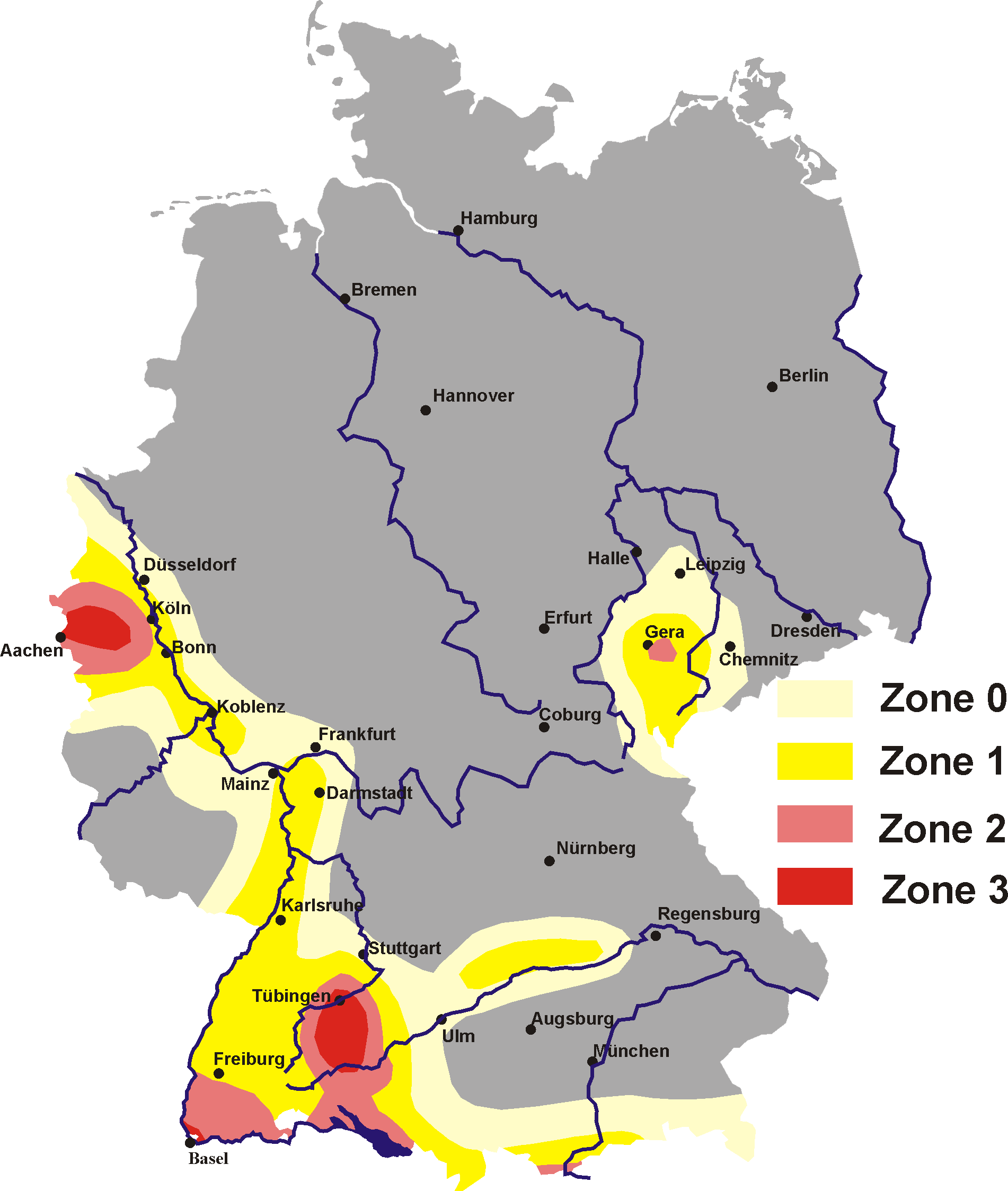
Earthquake zones

The Bonndorf Graben (German: Bonndorfer Graben) is a southeast-northwest to east-west striking, tectonic graben system on the eastern edge of the Black Forest and in the Baar between Bonndorf im Schwarzwald (in the south) and Donaueschingen (in the north). The upper reaches of the Wutach flow through it. Formed during Variscan mountain building (in the Palaeozoic), the graben was reactivated in the Tertiary, when the basement and platform being created.

The Bonndorf Graben continues through the Black Forest as the Lenzkirch Graben (Lenzkircher Graben) near Lenzkirch, the Höllental valley and the Freiburg Bay running up to the Upper Rhine Graben at Kaiserstuhl. It then heads east via Blumberg, here visible at the Riedöschinger Travertin and the Blauer Stein, in the direction of Engen in the Hegau with the volcanic formations of Hohenstoffeln, Hohenkrähen, Hohentwiel, Höwenegg, Hohenhewen and Neuhewen, Mägdeberg, Hohenkrähen, Staufen and Rosenegg to Lake Constance. Defined by the trough of the Bonndorf Graben, the Jurassic hills of the Swabian Jura and the older strata of the platform (bunter sandstone, muschelkalk, keuper) rise here the west.

== Literature ==
- Friedrich Spiegelhalter, Die Tektonik im obersten Teil des Bonndorfer Grabens, Inaugural-Dissertation, C. Winter 1912
- Serge von Bubnoff, Die hercynischen Brüche im Schwarzwald, ihre Beziehung zur carbonischen Faltung und ihre Posthumität, Stuttgart, Schweizerbart, 1921 (Phil. Hab.-Schr.) also as a special edition in: Neues Jahrbuch für Mineralogie, appendix or attachment to Volume 45.
- Hans Schneider, Über junge Krustenbewegungen in der voralpinen Landschaft zwischen dem südlichen Rheingraben und dem Bodensee, In: Mitteilungen der Naturforschende Gesellschaft Schaffhausen, 1973 and 1975
- Martin Georg Schäfer, Die devonischen Sedimente der Südschwarzwälder Hauptbewegungszone (Böllen-Lenzkirch). Appears as Volume 8 of Arbeiten aus dem Geologisch-Paläontologisches Institut der Technischen Hochschule Stuttgart, 1957
- Rudolf Metz: Geologische Landeskunde des Hotzenwaldes, 1987. ISBN 3-7946-0174-2
