= List of volcanoes in Germany =

This is a list of active and extinct volcanoes.

Name	Elevation		Location	Last eruption
Name	metres	feet	Coordinates	Last eruption
Eifel
Burgberg	401	1316	50°41′42″N 6°26′33″E	-
Duppacher Weiher	600	1968	50°10′N 6°51′E	7,050 BCE ± 1000 years
Goldberg	649	2129	50°20′09″N 6°27′41″E	-
Hohe Acht	747	2447	50°23′09″N 7°00′40″E	-
Mons Nore	678	2224	50°20′49″N 6°57′11″E	10,000 years ago
Hoher List	549	1802	50°09′42″N 6°50′55″E	-
Laacher See	275	902	50°15′N 7°10′E	10,930 BCE
West Eifel Volcanic Field	600	1968	50°10′N 6°51′E	7,050 BCE ± 1000 years
Hegau
Hohenfriedingen	545	1788	47°47′04″N 8°53′15″E	-
Hohenhewen	846	2776	47°50′09″N 8°44′52″E	-
Hohenkrähen	644	2113	47°47′56″N 8°49′14″E	-
Hohenstoffeln	844	2769	47°47′44″N 8°45′02″E	-
Hohentwiel	686	2251	47°45′53″N 8°49′08″E	-
Mägdeberg	664	2178	47°48′19″N 8°47′51″E	-
Rhön Mountains
Ellenbogen	814	2670	50°34′22″N 10°5′0″E	-
Feuerberg	832	2730	-	-
Heidelstein	913	3000	-	-
Kreuzberg	928	3040	50°22′15″N 9°58′06″E	-
Milseburg	835	2740	50°32′42″N 9°53′53″E	-
Schwabenhimmel	926	3040	-	-
Wasserkuppe	950	3110	50°29′53″N 9°56′16″E	-
Vogelsberg
Hoherodskopf	763	2503	-	-
Taufstein	773	2536	-	-

== See also ==
- Volcanic Eifel
