= Amicite =

Zeolite mineral

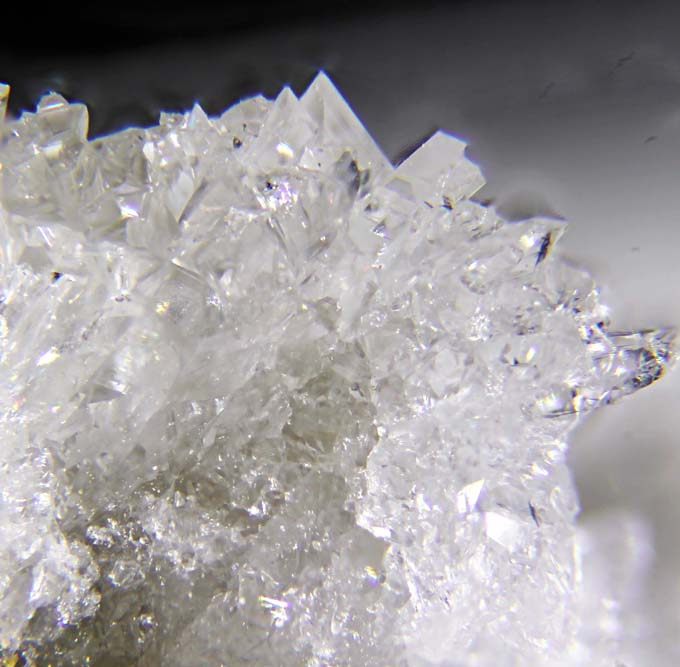

General
- Category: Tectosilicate minerals
- Group: Zeolite group
- Formula: K_{2}Na_{2}Al_{4}Si_{4}O_{16}·5(H_{2}O)
- IMA symbol: Ami
- Strunz classification: 9.GC.05
- Crystal system: Monoclinic
- Crystal class: Sphenoidal (2) (same H-M symbol)
- Space group: I2
- Unit cell: a = 10.26, b = 10.43 c = 9.90 [Å]; β = 88.32°; Z = 2

Identification
- Formula mass: 690.51 g/mol
- Color: Colorless
- Twinning: none
- Cleavage: none
- Fracture: Conchoidal
- Luster: Vitreous
- Streak: White
- Diaphaneity: Transparent
- Specific gravity: 2.18
- Optical properties: Biaxial
- Refractive index: na = 1.485, nb = 1.490, nc = 1.495
- Birefringence: 0.01

Amicite is a silicate mineral of the zeolite family. It has a general formula of K_{2}Na_{2}Al_{4}Si_{4}O_{16}·5(H_{2}O). Amicite was described in 1979 from specimens obtained at the Höwenegg quarry in Immendingen, Hegau, in the German state of Baden-Württemberg, which is consequently its type locality. The name is in honor of Giovanni Battista Amici (1786–1863) a botanist, physicist, optician, and inventor of microscope optical elements.

== Structure and optical properties ==
Amicite is monoclinic, so the crystallography has three axes of unequal length and the angles between two of the axes are 90 degrees and one is less than 90. Amicite is also pseudotetragonal with a = 10.23, b = 10.43, c = 9.88, and d = 89, and belongs to the space group I2.It appears as small colorless crystals, formed by the rhombic prisms {110} and {001}, combined in such a way that the crystal appears to be a dipyramid.

Amicite is classified as biaxial anisotropic so the velocity of light varies depending on direction through the mineral, as well as showing double refraction. The index of refraction is the geometric ratio of the angle of light entering the crystal (angle of incidence) over the angle the light is bent when it enters the crystal (angle of refraction). The index of refraction can be defined mathematically as n=velocity of light in a vacuum/velocity of light in the mineral. Amicite has three indices of refraction na = 1.485, nb = 1.490, nc = 1.494. A minerals birefringence is defined as the difference between the highest and lowest index of refraction, amicite's birefringence is 0.009.

Amicite is a zeolite mineral, the commercial uses of zeolites are a function its three distinct properties: absorption, ion exchange, and catalysis. Zeolites are also known for their ability to absorb and lose water without any effect on its crystal structure.

== Occurrence ==
Amicite is a very rare mineral, known only in four locations in the world, the type locality, the Vostochnyi and Kirovskii mines in the Chibiny massif, Murmansk region (Russia), where the largest known crystals come from, and also the quarry from Las Urracas, on the El Arzollar volcano, Campo de Calatrava (Ciudad Real). In addition to being poorly distributed, it is very scarce in the four locations mentioned.
