= Hohentwiel =

Mountain of volcanic origin in Baden-Württemberg, Germany

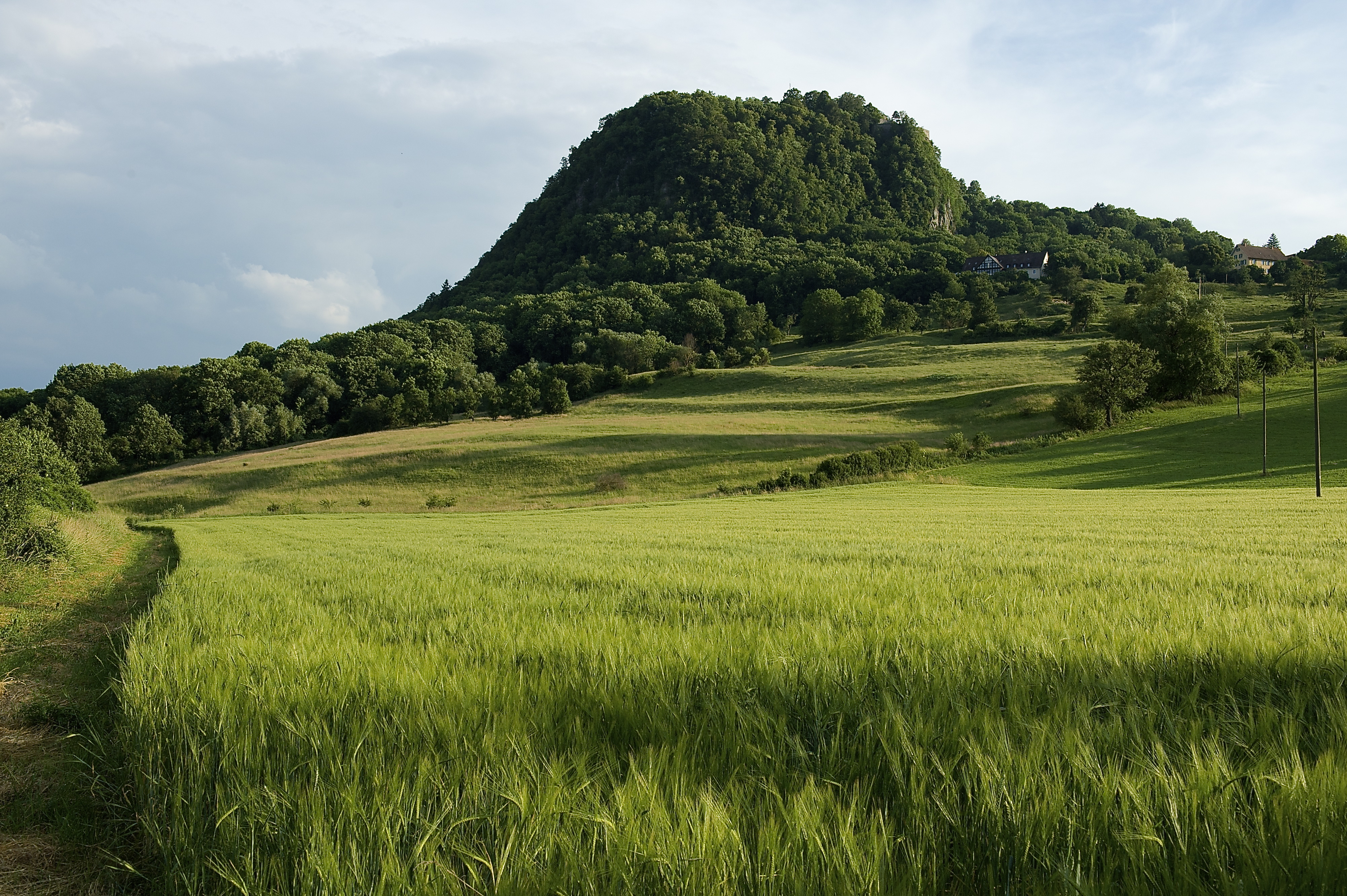

Highest point
- Elevation: 696.2 m (2,284 ft)
- Coordinates: 47°45′53″N 8°49′08″E

Geography
- Location within Baden-Württemberg
- Location: Konstanz district, Baden-Württemberg, Germany

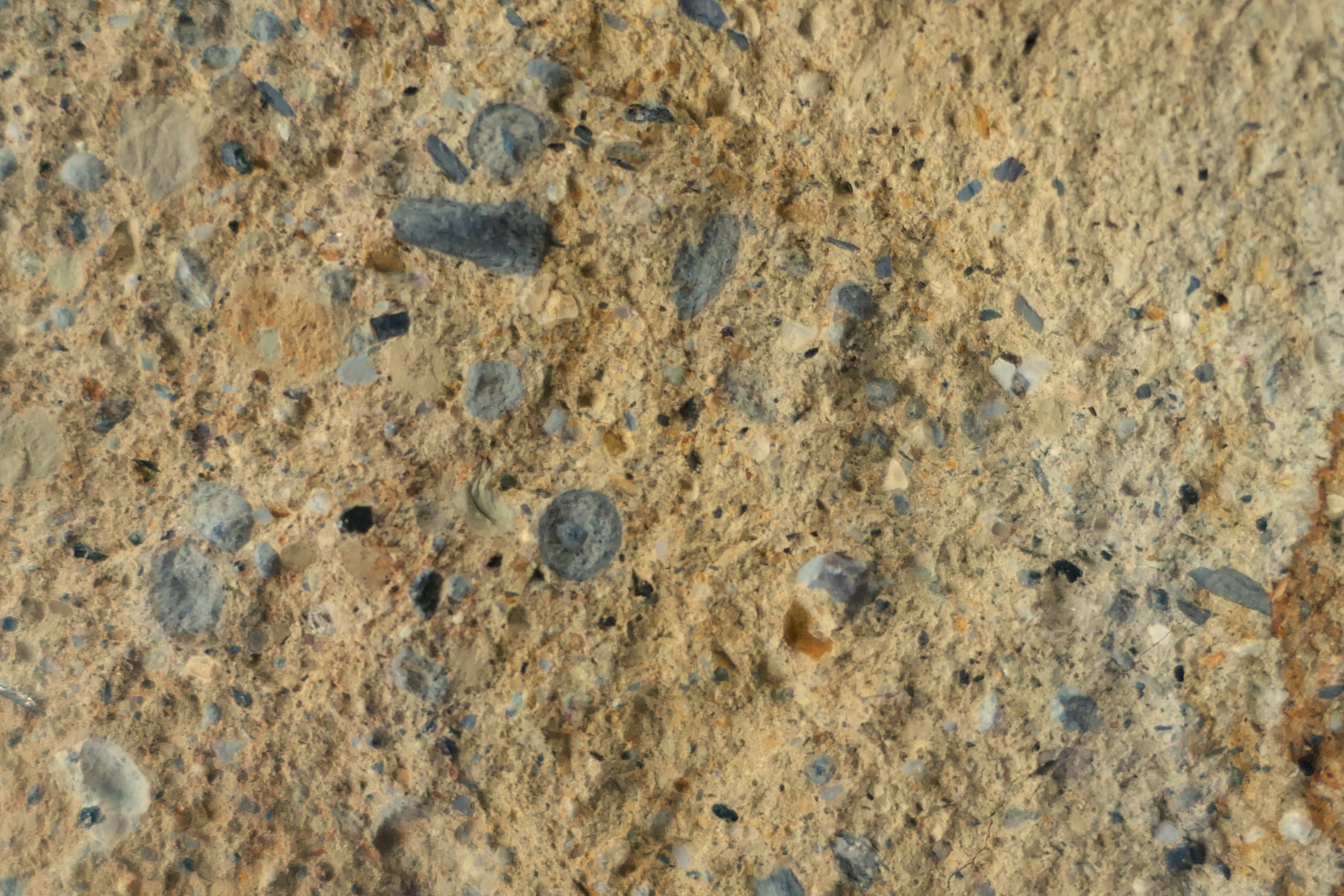
Tuffite from Hohentwiel

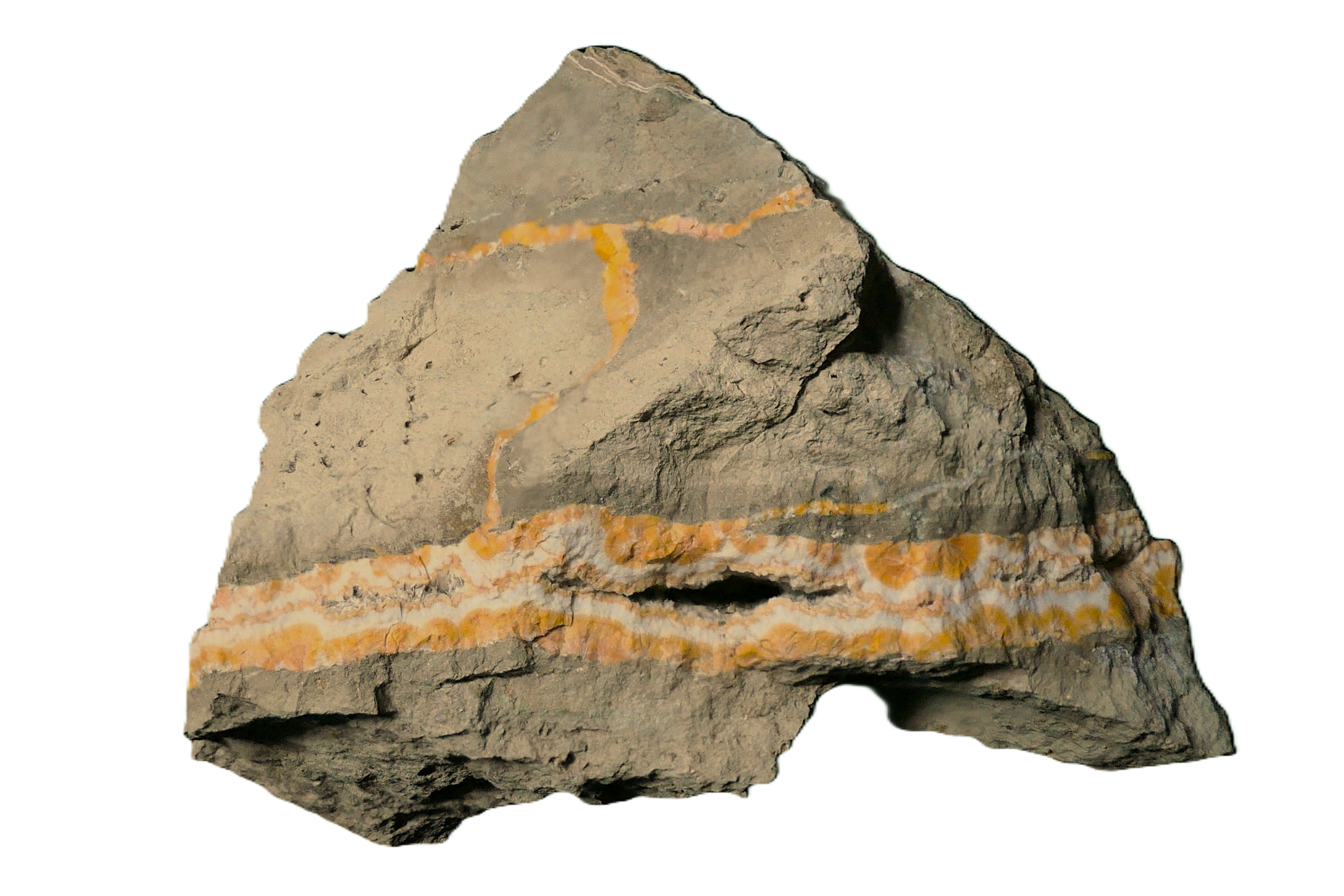
Phonolite from Hohentwiel

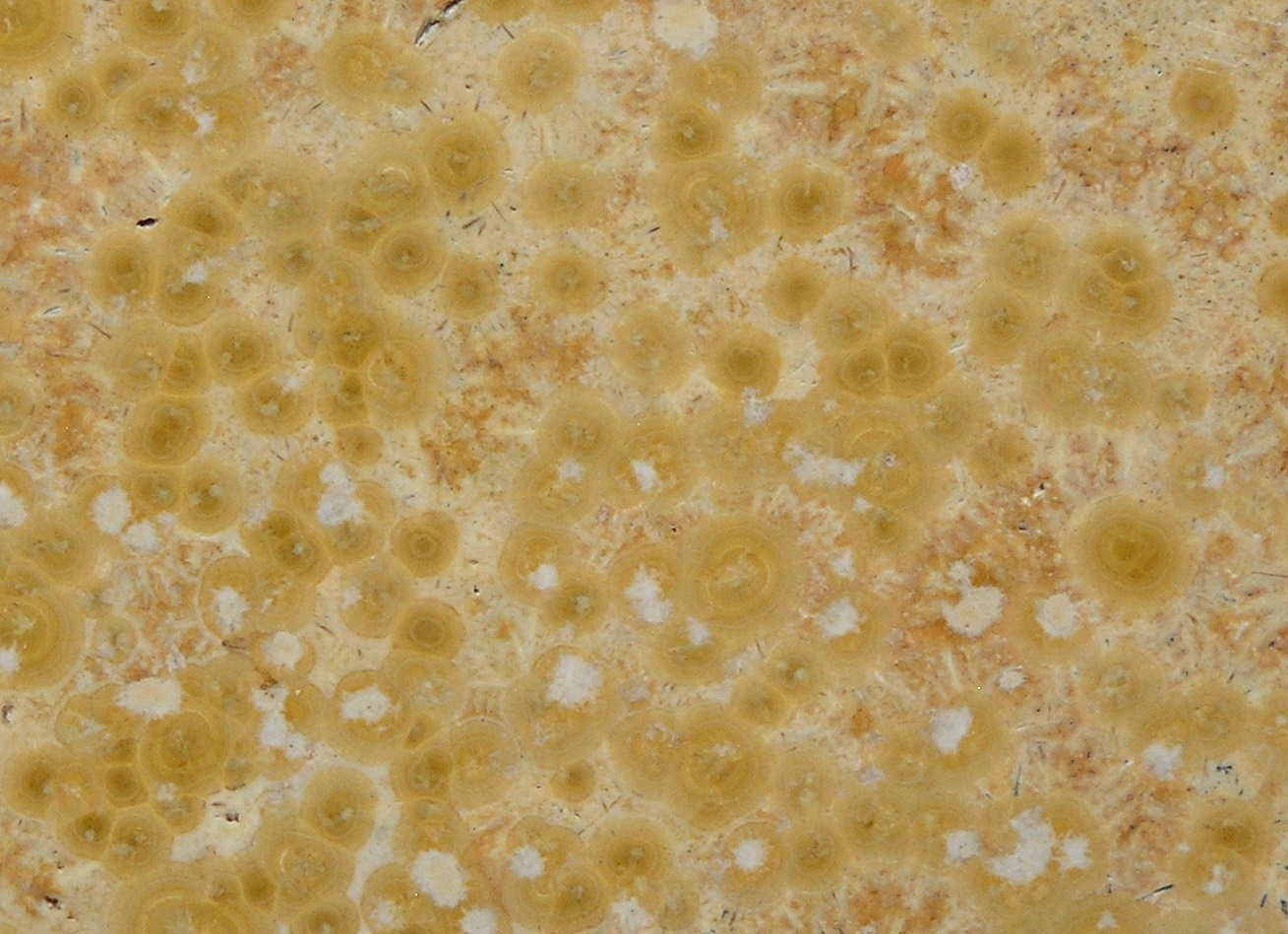
Natrolite from Hohentwiel (Type locality)

Hohentwiel (German pronunciation: [ˈhoːənˌtviːl]) is a mountain of volcanic origin in the Hegau region of Baden-Württemberg in southern Germany. It is the Hausberg of the industrial city of Singen, located west of it and ca 10 km (6.2 mi) west of Zeller See (Lake Constance). The ruins of the medieval Hohentwiel Castle rest on top of it.

Hohentwiel was an active volcano about 7–8 million years ago during the Miocene epoch, along with several other volcanoes in the Hegau region. It mostly consists of phonolite, which represents the former volcanic pipe. The surrounding softer rocks have been eroded over time by ice age glaciers during the Riss glaciation, creating an inverted relief and giving the mountain its present-day shape.

== Naming etymology ==
The first written accounts of Hohentwiel Castle are held within the St. Gallen monastery chronicle of Ekkehard IV (circa A.D. 980–1060) as "castellum tuiel", which was reportedly besieged in 915. In the Late Middle Ages, the name of the castle evolved from "Tuiel" to "Twiel" and eventually moved to its current spelling of "Hohentwiel" (lit. 'High Twiel'). The earliest record of its modern iteration is recorded in 1521.

Twiel, a name of varying signification which appears multiple times in the Alemannic-speaking region, has been the source of particular scholarly inquiry. Initial attempts to explain the etymology by Melchior Goldast pursued a Latin derivation of duellum meaning 'place where fighting [took place]' but this attribution was rejected by Ernst Förstemann in his Altdeutschen Namenbuch (Old German Name Book) of 1859 in favour of a Celtic conjecture. As Hermann Jellinghaus noted upon revisiting the naming work of Förstemann in 1916, the latter suggestion was found to be "hardly Celtic", and as Twiel recurs in several areas of Switzerland, a new hypothesis was required. In recent years an Alemannic origin has been advanced, on the basis of its initial sound being suggestive of an Indo-European root 'tu' - meaning 'swell'. Nevertheless, this interpretation remains inconclusive.

=== Code name ===
Germans used some common names as code names for secret technology. The FuG 200 Hohentwiel was a low-UHF band frequency maritime patrol radar system of the Luftwaffe in World War II, developed by C. Lorenz AG of Berlin starting in 1938. When the variant FuMG407 was built to detect low flying aircraft, they called it "Tiefentwiel".

== Biogeography ==
=== Geography ===
Hohentwiel is an isolated extinct volcanic mountain located in the south of Baden-Württemberg, Germany, in the Hegau region. It is part of the administrative district of Freiburg and the district of Constance. The Radolfzeller Aach tributary of the Rhine runs at the base the eastern slope of Hohentwiel, while Lake Constance is located some kilometres south-east, and the town of Hilzingen 3 km west. The extinct volcanoes Hohenkrähen, Mägdeberg and Hohenstoffeln are situated 4-6 km north-northwest of the mountain. Hohentwiel's headwaters slope steeply downward and are completely forested while its foot has flatter slopes to the west. The mountain rises approximately 260 metres out of the Aachtal Valley to the east.

=== Geology ===
Hohentwiel is located in a geological unit that encompasses Hegau and the western portion of Lake Constance. Its multiple geological layers were formed through sedimentation and volcanism, as evidenced by the Rhine Rift Valley, where the Alps were formed. A remnant of this activity is the Ur-Hohentwiel vent, which is filled with depositing tuff, as well as phonolite that rises out of the eastern terrain.

==== Sedmentation since the Jurassic Period ====
During the Jurassic period (201-145 million years ago), the continental shelf of Central Europe was submerged under the primeval Tethys Ocean, resulting in sedmentation convering the area and formation of the South German Jurassic. With the beginning of the Alpine Uplift Event, which transpired approximately 65 million years ago, land rose from the sea due to the collision between the African and European continents. To compensate for the elevation of land, the area in between the newly formed Alps and Swabian Alb subsided, and with it, the Hegau region. This erosive processes of the subsidance caused much of the surrounding dry surface area to wear away. The material was deposited in the still-flooded depression, forming a molassae basin on the sea floor (marine molasse). With a thickness of roughly 5000 metres, the resulting molasse blanket filled the space between the two continents.

==== Volcanism in the Miocene Period ====
During the Miocene period (c. 23–5.3 million years ago), after the flood waters receded, the deep fractures and stresses caused from the uplift of the Alps and Swabian Alb resulted in intraplate volcanism. This type of volcanism is not caused by the movement of a tectonic plate, but rather is a result of uplift with a single continental plate. This volcanism is believed to have been caused by the convergence of the Bonndorfer Graben fault, running northwest–southeast, and a north–south fault extending from Höwenegg to Riedheim.

Active volcanoes were present for a duration of 6-7 million years. The time span can be divided into two sections. In the first three million years, eruptions of volcanoes such as Ur-Hohentwiel reached the earth's surface, creating a tuff cone mountain which towered over its surroundings by 100-200 metres. In the course of time and with a decrease in eruptions, the thickness of the covering tuffs reduced due to erosion. During the Tortonian period of the late Miocene, the second phase of volcanic activity took place. Rising magma no longer reached the surface land area, but solidified in ascending passages through the molasse. The composition of the magma likely had a higher silica content, causing the mass to have increased viscosity and durability. This resulted in the formation of a vent plug under the tuff layer, approximately 100 metres thick.

==== The Quaternary Glaciation ====
The Quaternary period was the last strongly formative period in Earth's glacial history, characterised by four major glacial periods: Günz (400,000 - 300,000 years ago), Mindel (300,000 - 200,000 years ago), Riß 200,000 - 130,000 years ago) and Würm (20,000 years ago). During these periods, Alpine glaciers continued to erode the landscape. The Würm glaciation saw the Rhine glacier advance northward. The Lake Constance foreland glacier, part of the Rhine glacier, eroded the molasse and tuff layers around the Hohentwiel plug, causing the mountain summit to become exposed as the ice receded. Tuff is only present in the western portion, due to the neutralising effect of the ice masses in their direction of advance.

==== Stratification ====
Stratification of the Hohentwiel landscape is characterised by layers of sedimentary rocks - including Brown Jurassic, White Jurassic, Kimmeridgian, Tithonian, Lower Freshwater Molasse, Brackish Molasse, Upper Seawater Molasse, Jurassic Gelfluh of the Upper Freshwater Molasse, phonolite debris, cover tuff, mica sands, and Jurassic nape. These sedimentary layers range in thickness from 100 to 150 metres, with an additional 70 metres of basic facies at the lower level. This is topped by an upper layer of moraine material in the far western portion of the mountain.

== Hohentwiel Castle ==
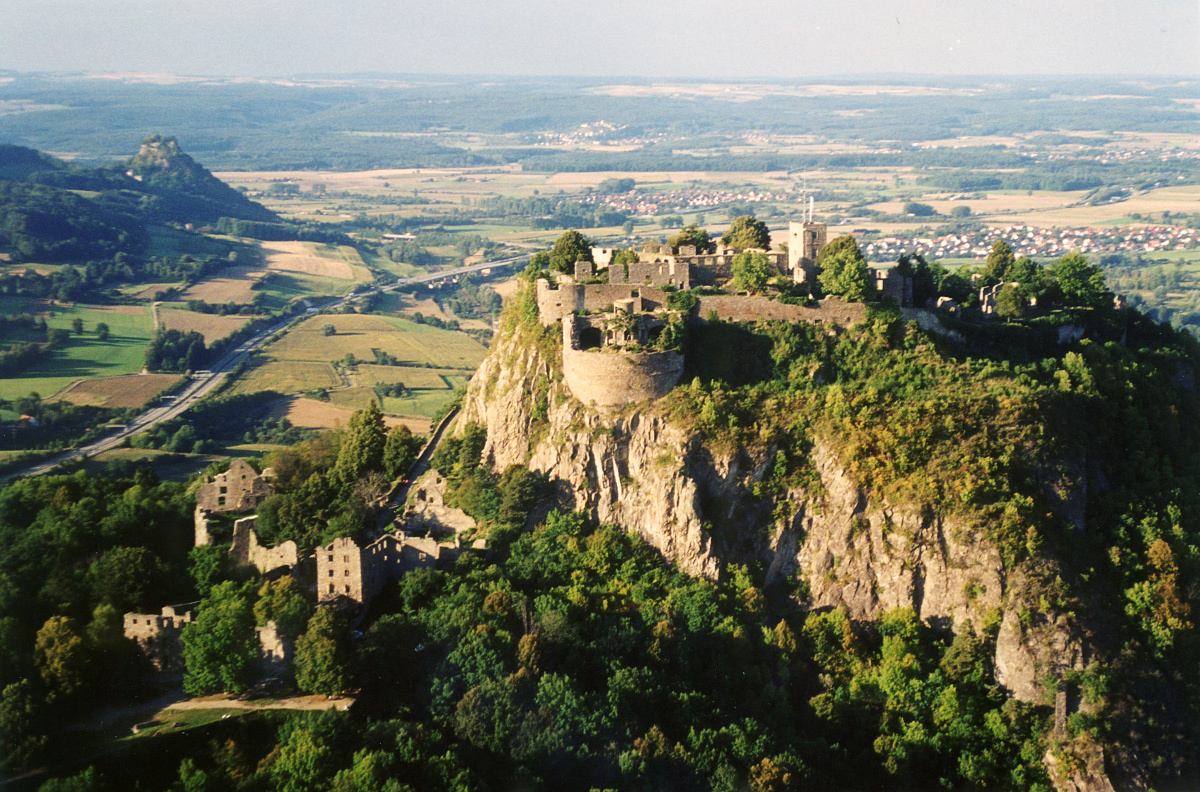
Aerial photo of the Hohentwiel castle

Hohentwiel Castle, whose ruins are on top of Hohentwiel, was built in 914 using stone taken from the mountain by Burchard II, Duke of Swabia. Originally, the Monastery of St. Georg was within the fortress, but in 1005 it was moved to Stein am Rhein (now in Switzerland), and the Swabian dukes lost control of Hohentwiel.

In the later Middle Ages the noble families von Singen-Twiel (12th–13th centuries), von Klingen (to 1300) and von Klingenberg (to 1521) resided here. In 1521, it was passed on to Duke Ulrich von Württemberg, who developed Hohentwiel into one of the strongest fortresses of his duchy. During this time, it began to be used as a prison, and in 1526, Hans Müller von Bulgenbach, a peasant commander, was imprisoned there before he was executed.

The fortress resisted five Imperial sieges in the Thirty Years' War, under the command of Konrad Widerholt between 1634 and 1648. The effect was that Württemberg remained Protestant, while most of the surrounding areas returned to Catholicism in the Counterreformation. The castle served as a Württemberg prison in the 18th century and was destroyed in 1801 after being peacefully handed over to the French. Today the former fortress Hohentwiel is the biggest castle ruin in Germany.

== See also ==
- List of volcanoes in Germany
