= Hohenkrähen =

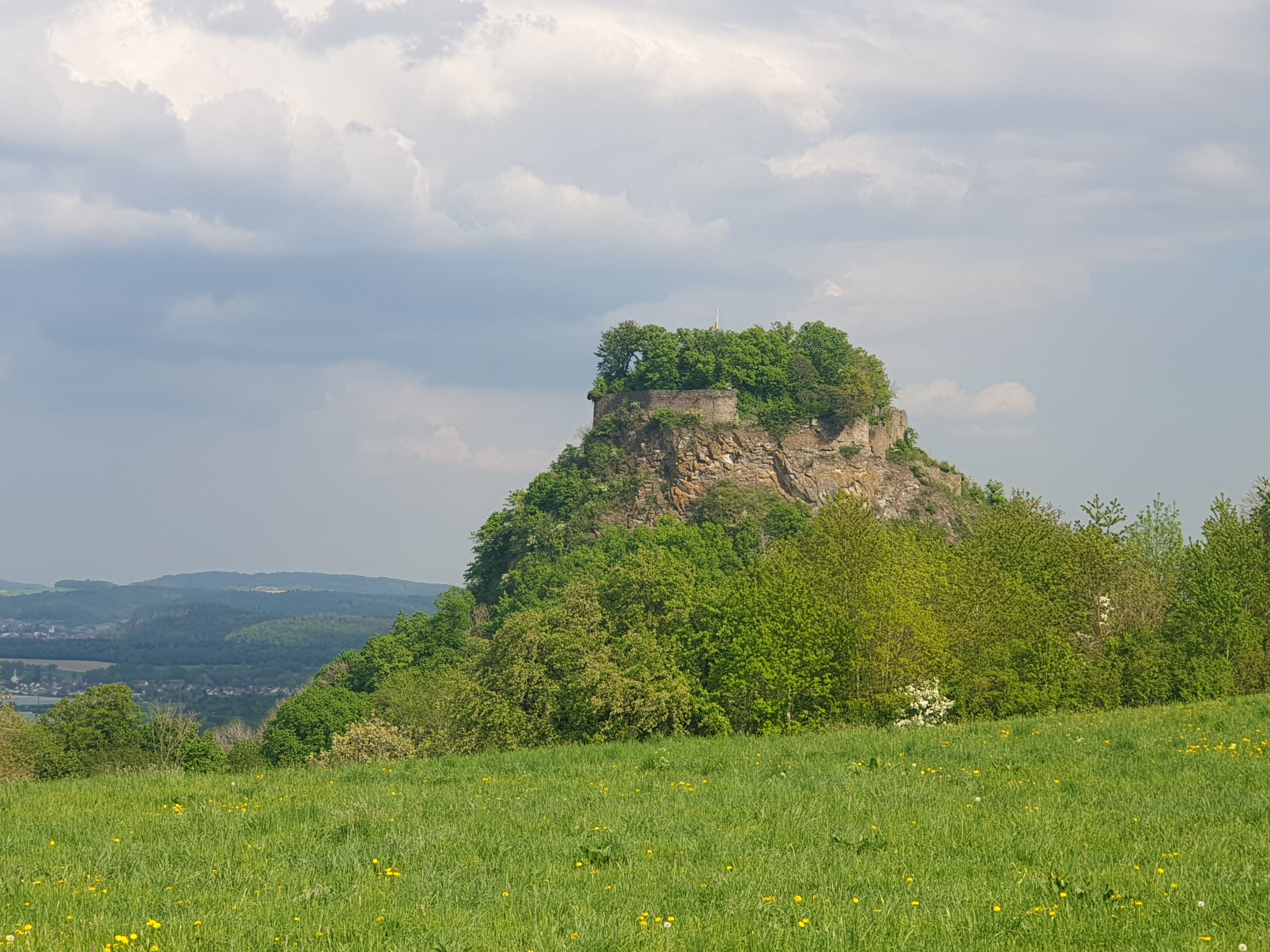

Highest point
- Elevation: 644 m (2,113 ft)
- Coordinates: 47°47′56″N 8°49′14″E

Naming
- Language of name: German

Geography
- Location: Konstanz district, Baden-Württemberg, Germany

Hohenkrähen (lit. 'High-Crows') is a mountain of volcanic origin in the Hegau region (Konstanz district) of southern Baden-Württemberg, Germany. The ruins of Hohenkrähen Castle are on the top of the mountain.

== Location ==
This mountain is located on the Gemarkung of Duchtlingen (Hilzingen) between the villages of Duchtlingen, Schlatt unter Krähen and Mühlhausen-Ehingen.

== Summit ==
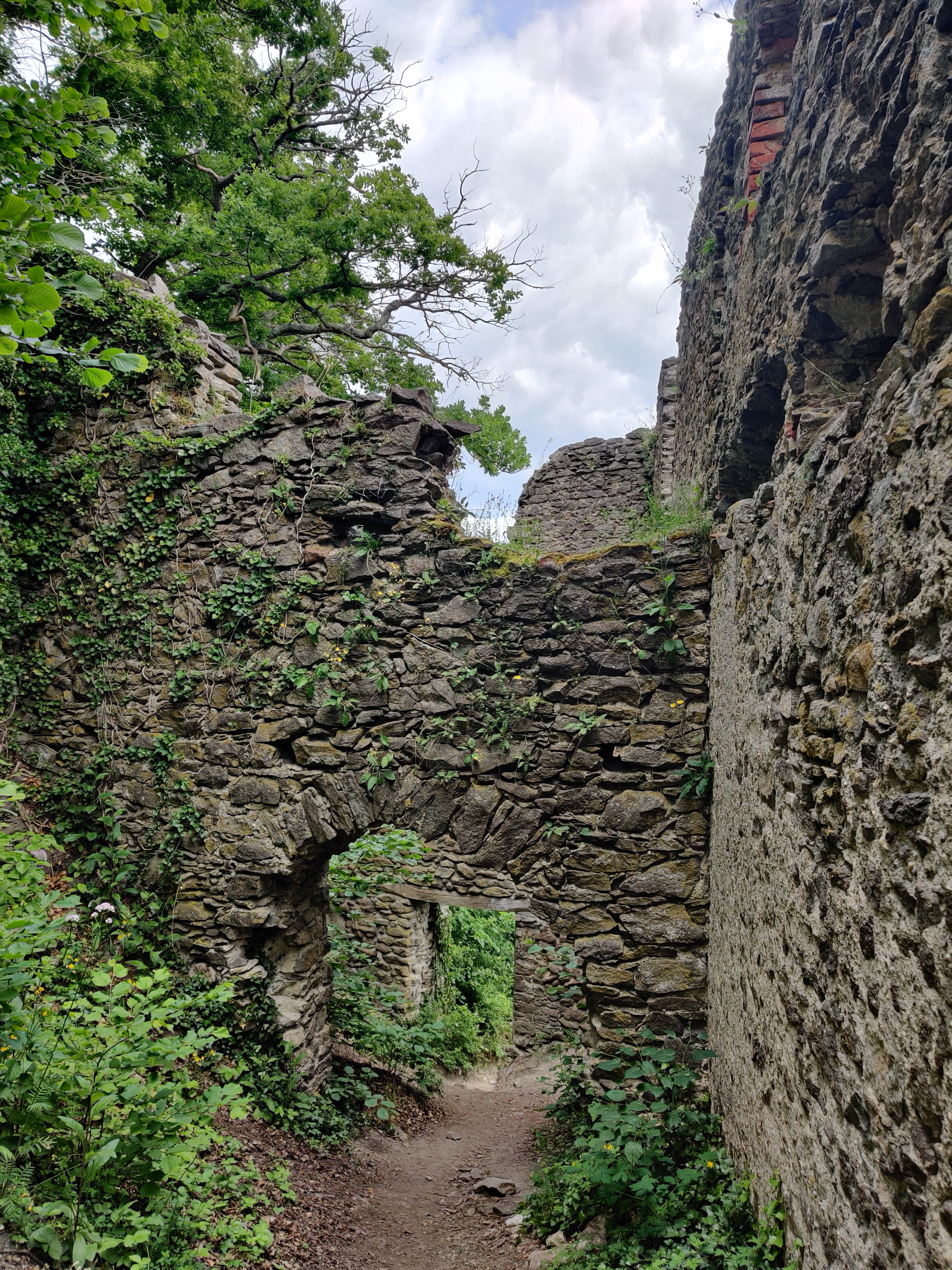
Ruins of Hohenkrähen Castle

The summit of Hohenkrähen is at 644 meters (2,113 ft) above sea level and contains the ruins of a castle of the same name. The mountain top offers a good view of Hohentwiel and Mägdeberg mountains and the western part of Lake Constance.

== Flora ==
There are different types of rare plants located on the mountain. These include: gray cinquefoil, Bleicher wallflower (Erysimum crepidifolium), mountain Alyssum, Festknolliger Corydalis, finger toothwort (Dentaria pentaphyllos), yellow sage (Salvia glutinosa) and mountain leek (Allium senescens). The mountain is also covered with old Tilia trees.
