= Hilzingen =

- Municipality
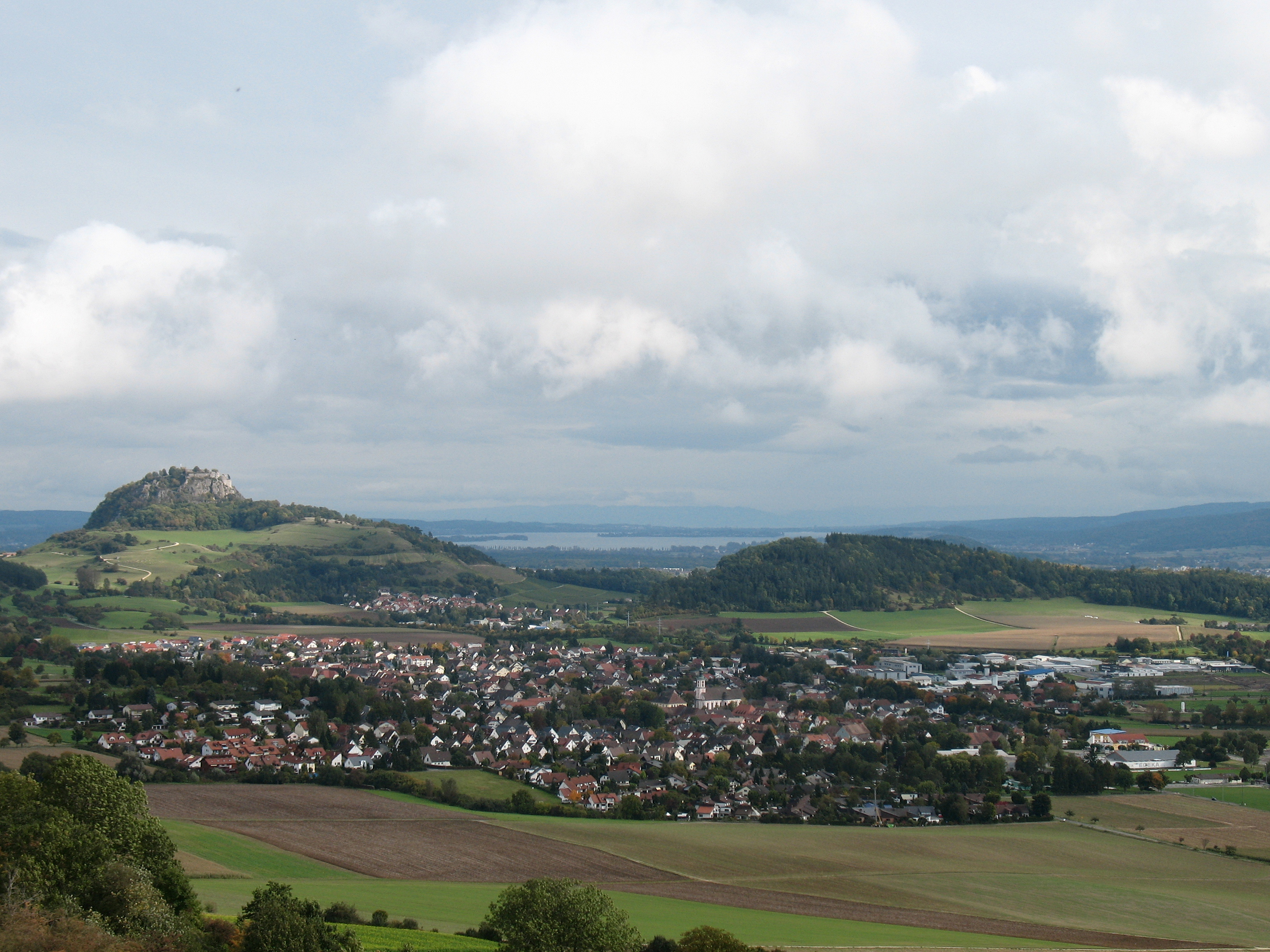
- Hilzingen (Hohentwiel, Zeller Lake and Staufen in the background)

- Coat of arms

- Location of Hilzingen within Konstanz district
- Interactive map of Hilzingen
- Location within Germany Location within Baden-Württemberg
- Coordinates: 47°45′55″N 08°47′04″E
- Country: Germany
- State: Baden-Württemberg
- Admin. region: Freiburg
- District: Konstanz

Government
  - Mayor (2020–28): Holger Mayer

Area
  - Total: 53.02 km^{2} (20.47 sq mi)
- Elevation: 466 m (1,529 ft)

Population (2025-12-31)
  - Total: 9,257
  - Density: 174.6/km^{2} (452.2/sq mi)
- Time zone: UTC+01:00 (CET)
  - Summer (DST): UTC+02:00 (CEST)
- Postal codes: 78247
- Dialling codes: 07739, 07731
- Vehicle registration: KN
- Website: www.hilzingen.de

Hilzingen (German pronunciation: [ˈhɪltsɪŋən]) is a municipality in the Hegau region in the district of Konstanz in Baden-Württemberg in Germany.

== Twin towns ==
Hilzingen is twinned with:

- Lizzano in Belvedere, Italy
- Stolpen, Germany
