= Wartenberg (Swabian Jura) =

Mountain in Baden-Württemberg, Germany

Wartenberg (Donau)
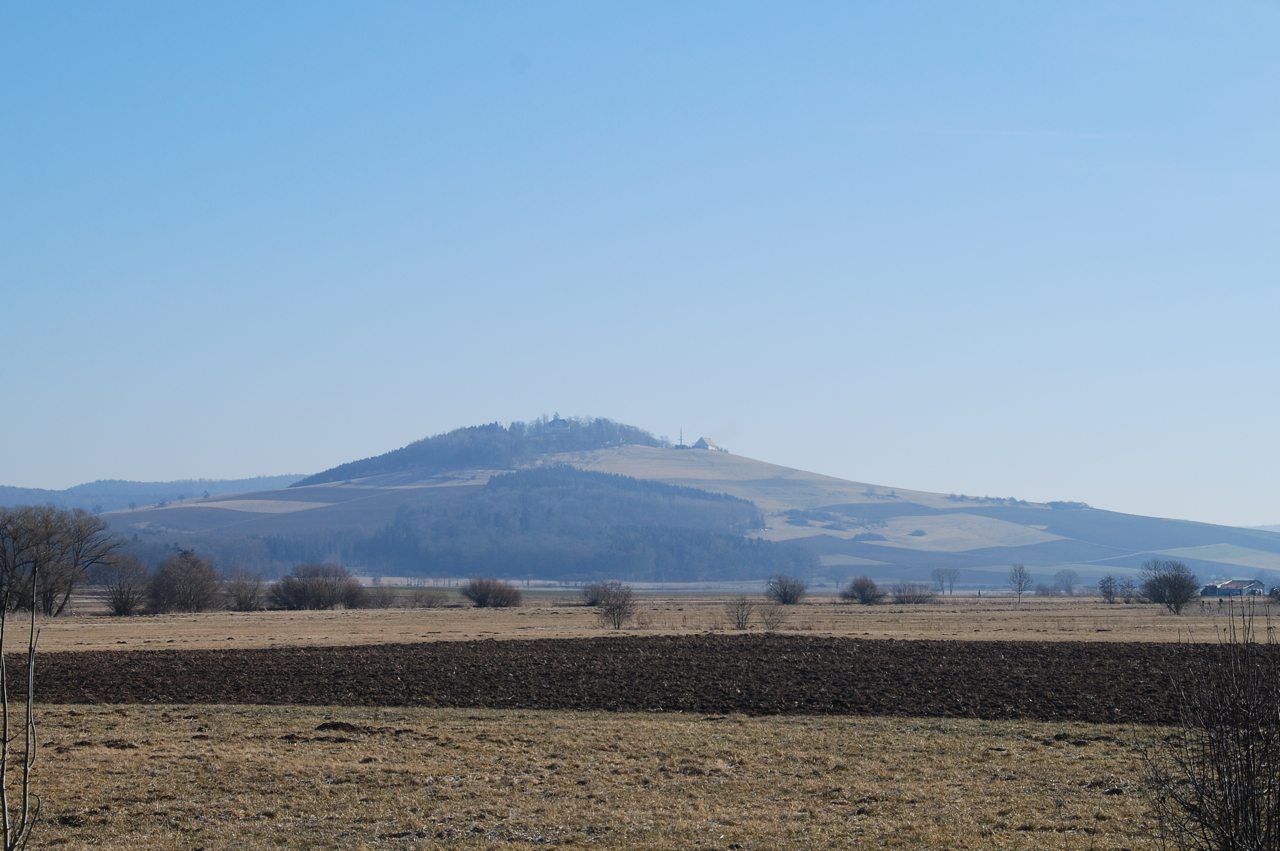

Highest point
- Elevation: 844 m (2,769 ft)
- Coordinates: 47°55′31″N 08°37′03″E

Geography
- Location within Germany
- Location: Baden-Württemberg, Germany

Geology
- Mountain type: Diatreme

Wartenberg (German pronunciation: [ˈvaʁtn̩bɛʁk]) is a mountain of volcanic origin in the Hegau region (Tuttlingen district) of southern Baden-Württemberg, Germany. The ruins of Wartenberg Castle rest on top of the mountain.
