= Hohentwiel Castle =

Castle ruin in Baden-Württemberg, Germany

Coordinates: 47.7647°N 8.8189°E

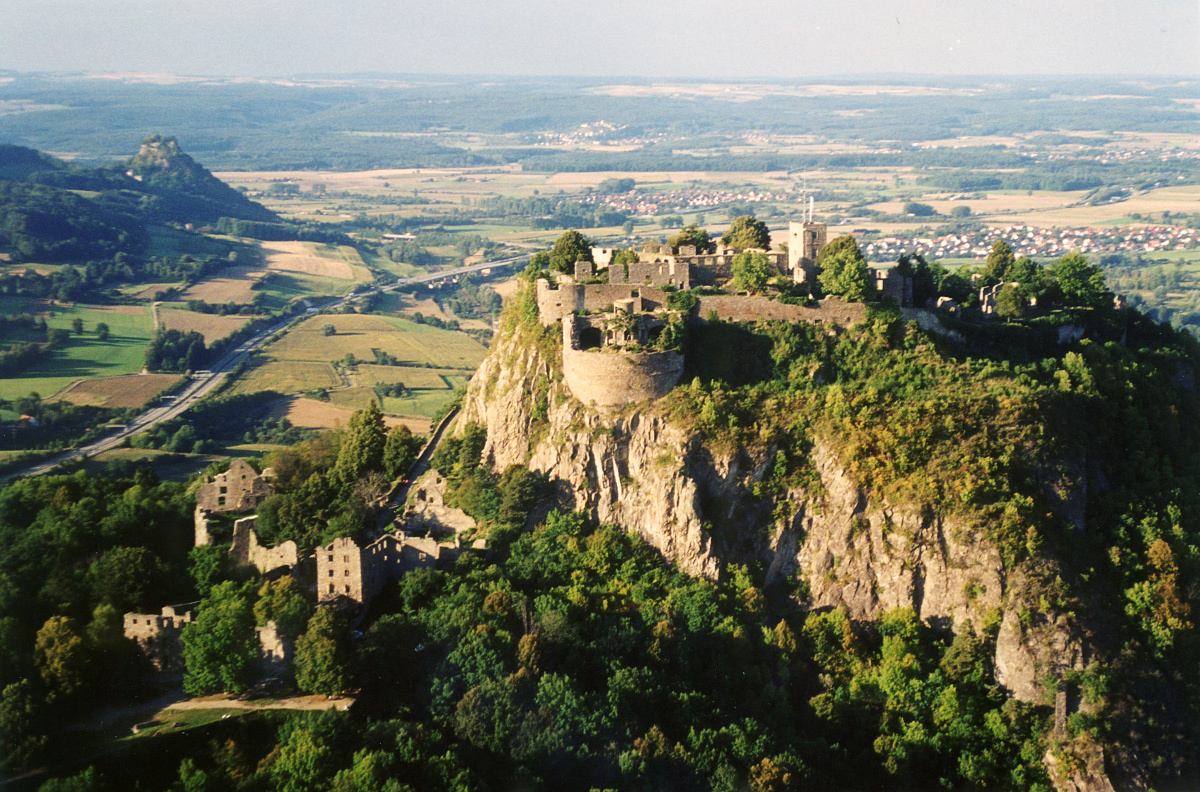
Aerial view of Hohentwiel Castle

Hohentwiel Castle is a ruin of a former castle on the peak of the dead volcano Hohentwiel in Baden-Württemberg, Germany. It is located in the region called Hegau, which is close to the Lake of Constance. The mountain towers over the city of Singen, which is located on the foot of the mountain, by 260 meters. With an overall area of nine hectares, Hohentwiel castle is the biggest castle ruin in Germany which is open for tourists. Since 1990, more than 80,000 tourists have visited the ruin every year; the maximum was reached in 2002 when 126,500 people visited Hohentwiel castle. The annual Hohentwiel-Festival takes place in the fortress area.

In its history, the castle was also a ducal seat during the Early Middle Ages and an ordinary castle during the High Middle Ages. The fortress on the Hohentwiel was first mentioned in 915. In the following times, the mountain was in possession of different noble families, such as the House of Zähringen. In the early 16th century, the Hohentwiel was more and more influenced by the House of Württemberg and became ducal seat once more. In the following centuries, the castle was expanded to the fortress of the state of Württemberg and was unsuccessfully besieged five times during the Thirty-Years' War. Later, the castle was used as state penitentiary, until it was slighted during the War of the Second Coalition in 1801. After its destruction, the ruin soon became of interest to tourism.

== Festivals ==
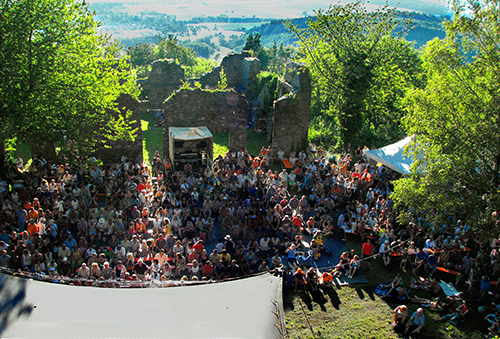
Hohentwiel-Festival in 2007

Around 1900, the city of Singen already planned to establish Hohentwiel-Festivals. For this purpose, a festival hall was erected in which two festivals took place in 1906 and 1907. Yet in the following years, the project failed, and the hall was torn down in 1918. After World War I, the idea of having festivals was revived and came to life in August 1921. This time, they took place in the yard of the ducal castle. In 1922, the festival was called the Volksfestspiele (festival of the people) and lasted six weeks. It took place in the castle which was used as a "natural scene". The festival was carried on with different financial success until the Great Depression in 1929. Between 1935 and 1939, the German Festivals took place under the rule of the Nazis and under the support of Joseph Goebbels.

Because the Hohentwiel became part of the city of Singen in 1969, a special festival week took place in the summer. Besides other things, a Castle Festival with fireworks was organized. In 1975, a Jazz Festival took place in Hohentwiel Castle and has been repeated annually since. In 1980, it grew even bigger, so more parts of the castle had to be used. In the same year, a Kultursonntag (Sunday for culture) with 13 stages in the castle and more than 20,000 visitors took place. In 1990, Miles Davis performed at the festival, which led to international attention. Nowadays, the festival takes place for one week in July.
