= Blauer Stein =

Mountain of volcanic origin in Germany

Coordinates: 47°49′37″N 8°35′54″E

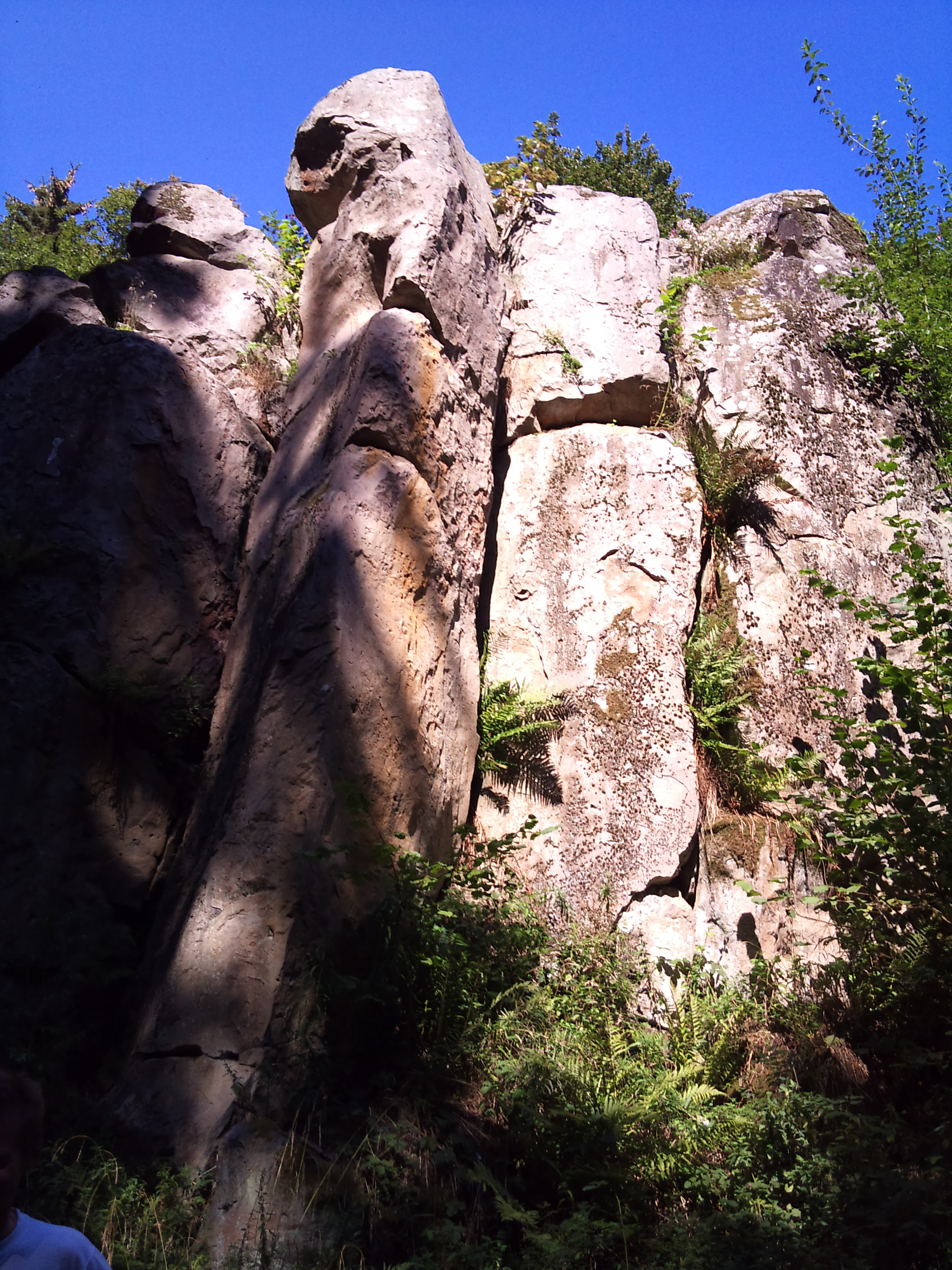

Highest point
- Elevation: 836 m (2,743 ft)

Geography
- Location: Baden-Württemberg, Germany

Blauer Stein (lit. 'Blue Rock') is a mountain of volcanic origin in the Hegau region (Schwarzwald-Baar) of southern Baden-Württemberg, Germany. It is located near the village of Randen (Blumberg).
