= Neuhewen =

Coordinates: 47°52′45″N 8°43′03″E

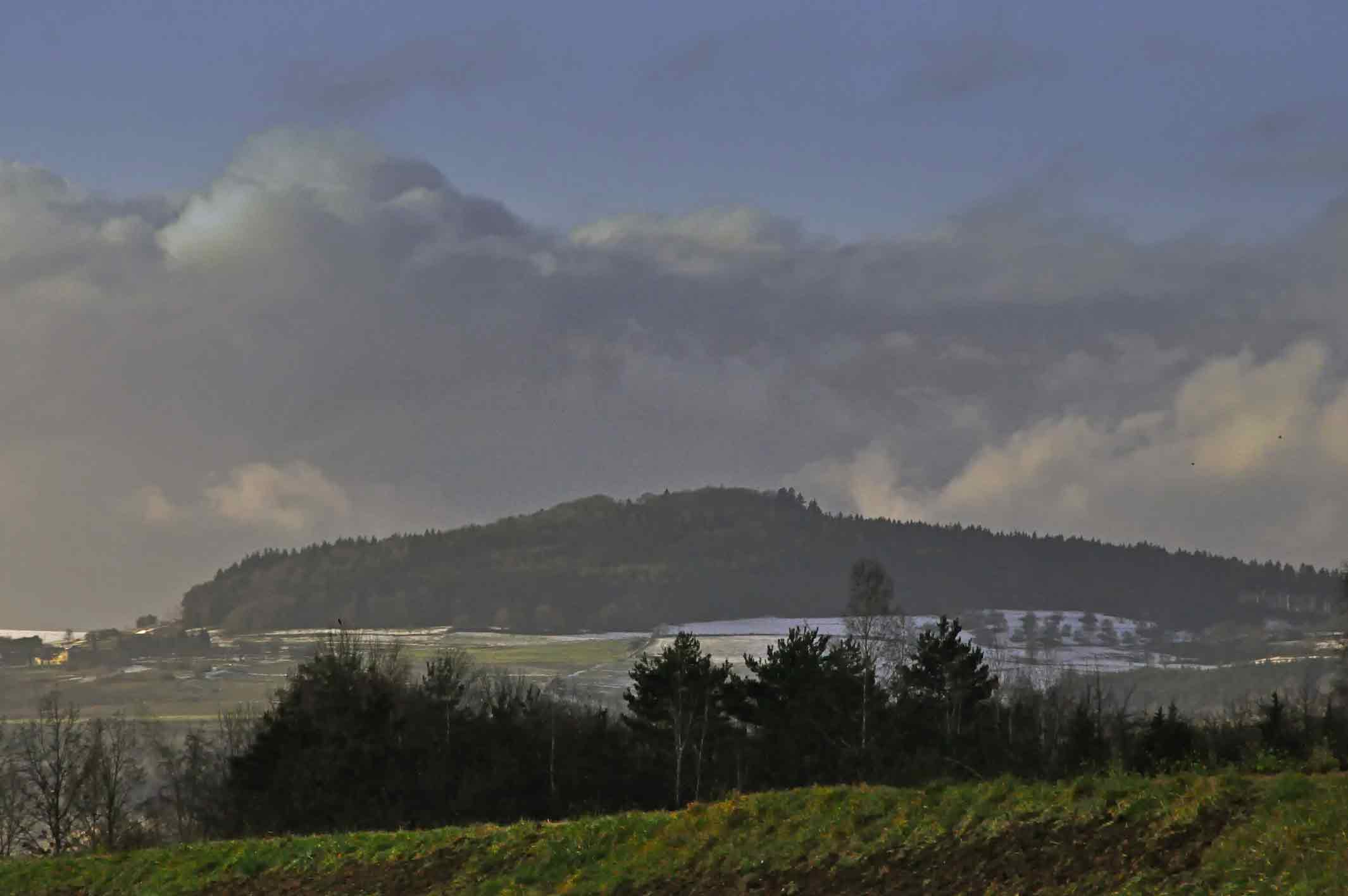

Highest point
- Elevation: 867.2 m (2,845 ft)

Geography
- Location: Baden-Württemberg, Germany

Geology
- Mountain type: Basalt

Neuhewen is a mountain of volcanic origin in the Hegau region (Konstanz district) of southern Baden-Württemberg, Germany. The ruins of Neuhewen Castle are located on top of the mountain.
