= Staufen (Hegau) =

Coordinates: 47°46′18″N 8°48′24″E

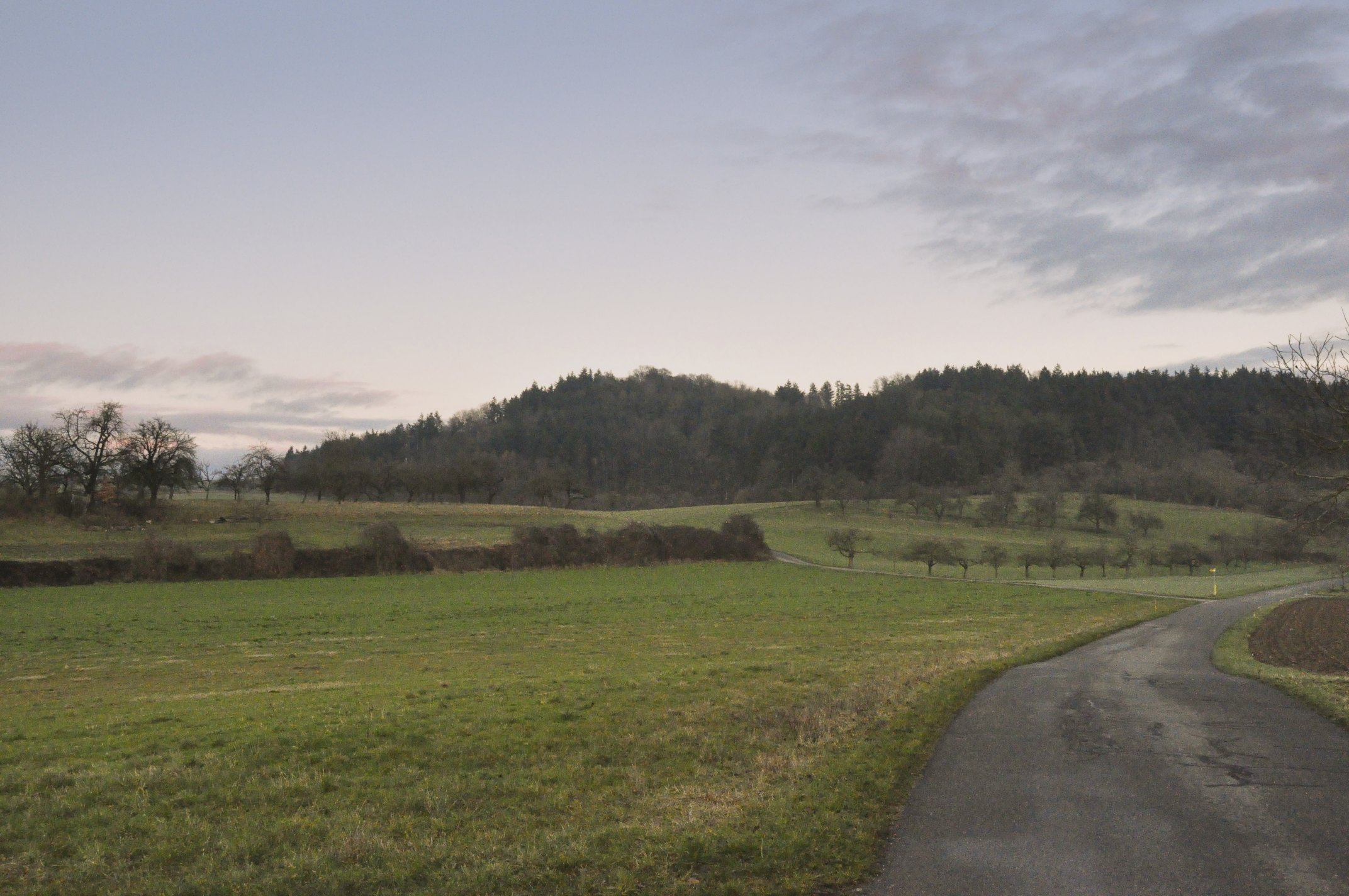
- Staufen Mountain

Highest point
- Elevation: 593 m (1,946 ft)

Geography
- Location: Baden-Württemberg, Germany

Staufen is a mountain of volcanic origin in the Hegau region (Konstanz district) of southern Baden-Württemberg, Germany. It is located near the town of Hilzingen.

== History ==
During the Roman period a watchtower stood on the mountain. During the medieval period, probably in the 12th century, A castle was built upon the mountain. The castle was first mentioned in 1248 and was inhabited until 1607. During this period it was burned twice, in 1499 and in 1525. During the Thirty Years War the castle was demolished by Swedish troops.

Both, hill and castle should not be mixed up with the historically more important hill and castle of Hohenstaufen, medieval home to the former ducal, royal and consequently imperial Staufer family.
