= Hohenhewen =

Mountain in Germany

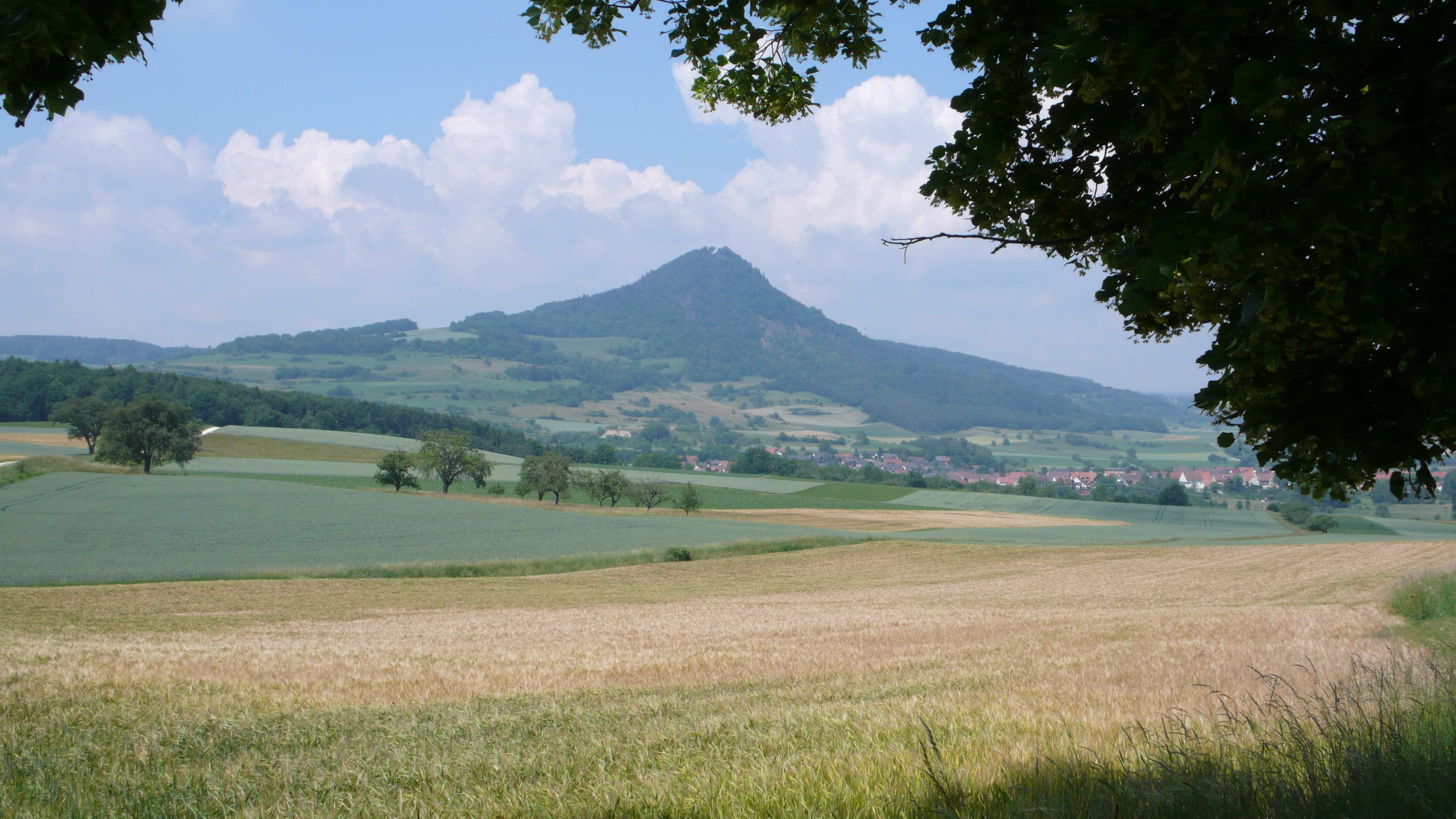
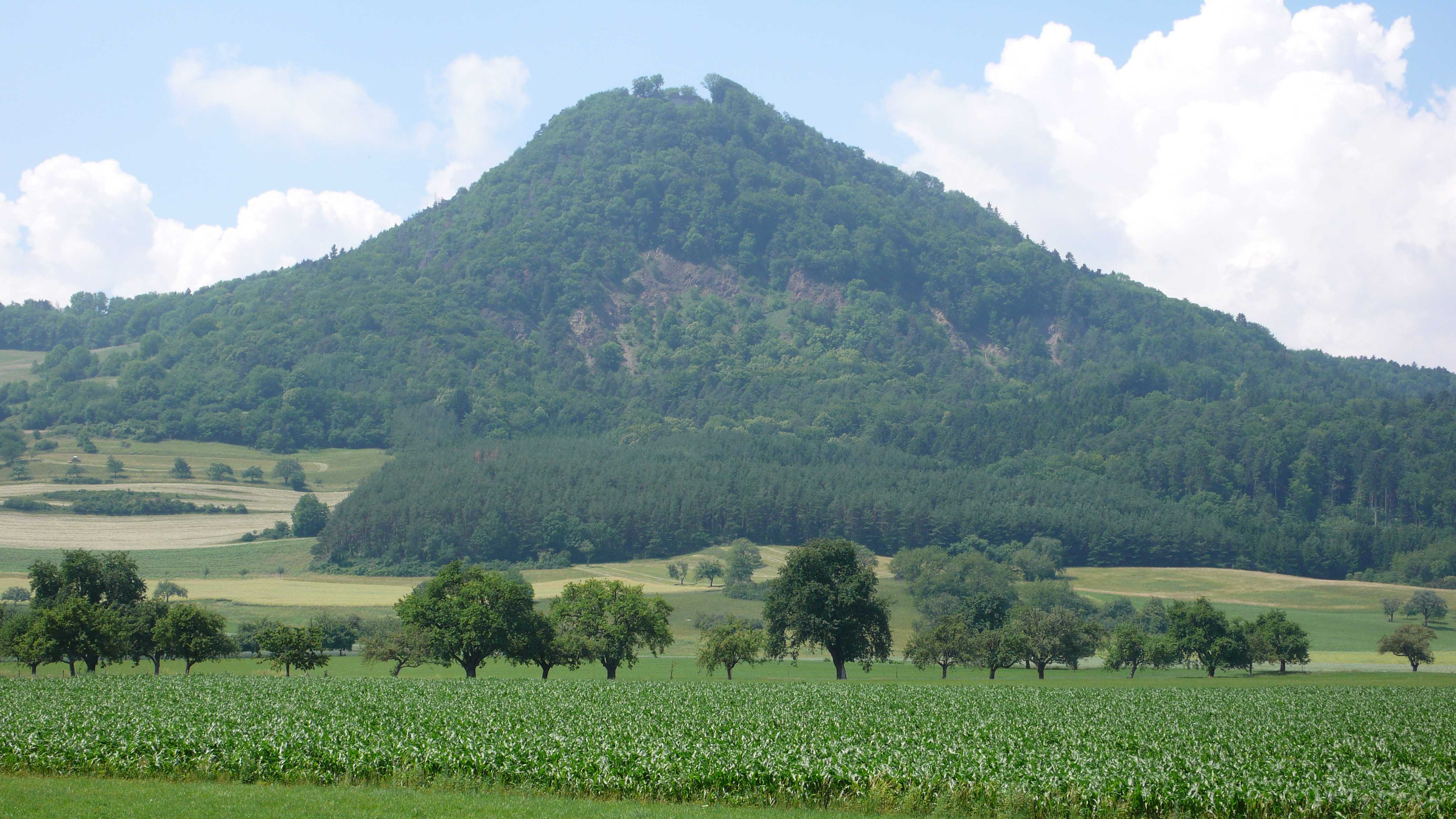
- The Hohenhewen from the south The Hohenhewen from the southeast

Highest point
- Elevation: 843.7 m above sea level (NHN) (2,768 ft)
- Listing: Ruins of Hohenhewen Castle with observation platform
- Coordinates: 47°50′8.5″N 8°44′50.1″E

Geography
- Location within Baden-Württemberg
- Location: Baden-Württemberg, Germany
- Parent range: Hegau

Geology
- Mountain type: Kegelberg
- Rock type: Basalt

The Hohenhewen, also called the Hohenhöwen or, colloquially, Höwen, is the local mountain of the town of Engen, located in the Hegau region of Baden-Württemberg, southern Germany. It is of volcanic origin.

== Summit area ==
The summit of the Hohenhewen lies at 843.7 m above sea level (NHN), rising above the surrounding area by around 300 metres. On its summit plateau are the ruins of Hohenhewen Castle and a viewing platform built on the remains of the old bergfried, from where the other mountains and hills of the Hegau, Lake Constance and, to the north, the Swabian Jura, can be seen. In good visibility even the Alps and the Black Forest may be made out.

== Ascent ==
The Hohenhewen may be ascended from Anselfingen to the north or Welschingen to the south. Whilst the northern ascent is fairly wide and comfortable (T1), the climb from Welschingen is much steeper and narrower and requires a certain degree of sure-footedness (T2). Good footwear is recommended.

== Geology and nature conservation ==
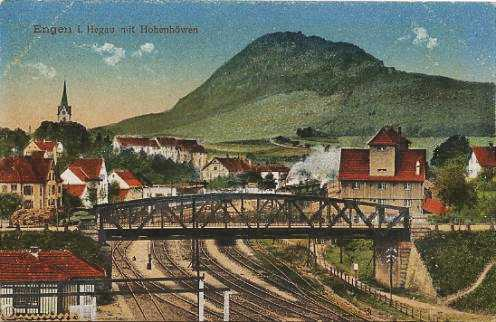
Engen im Hegau, 1900 postcard

Like almost all Hegau mountains, the Hohenhewen has a volcanic origin. Its bedrock consists of basalt. A 39-hectare area on the Hohenhewen has been designated a nature reserve since 1982 and its steep eastern mountainside is of particular botanical interest.

== Meaning of the name ==
The name Hohenhewen is probably of Celtic origin: the Celtic word for a domed mountain is ceven. It is possible that the mountain, in turn, gave its name to the Hegau region (Hewengew).

== See also ==
- List of volcanoes in Germany
