= Immendingen =

- Municipality
- Flag Coat of arms

- Location of Immendingen within Tuttlingen district
- Interactive map of Immendingen
- Location within Germany Location within Baden-Württemberg
- Coordinates: 47°56′24″N 08°43′59″E
- Country: Germany
- State: Baden-Württemberg
- Admin. region: Freiburg
- District: Tuttlingen

Government
  - Mayor (2020–28): Markus Stärk

Area
  - Total: 74.03 km^{2} (28.58 sq mi)
- Elevation: 662 m (2,172 ft)

Population (2025-12-31)
  - Total: 6,635
  - Density: 89.63/km^{2} (232.1/sq mi)
- Time zone: UTC+01:00 (CET)
  - Summer (DST): UTC+02:00 (CEST)
- Postal codes: 78194
- Dialling codes: 07462
- Vehicle registration: TUT
- Website: www.immendingen.de

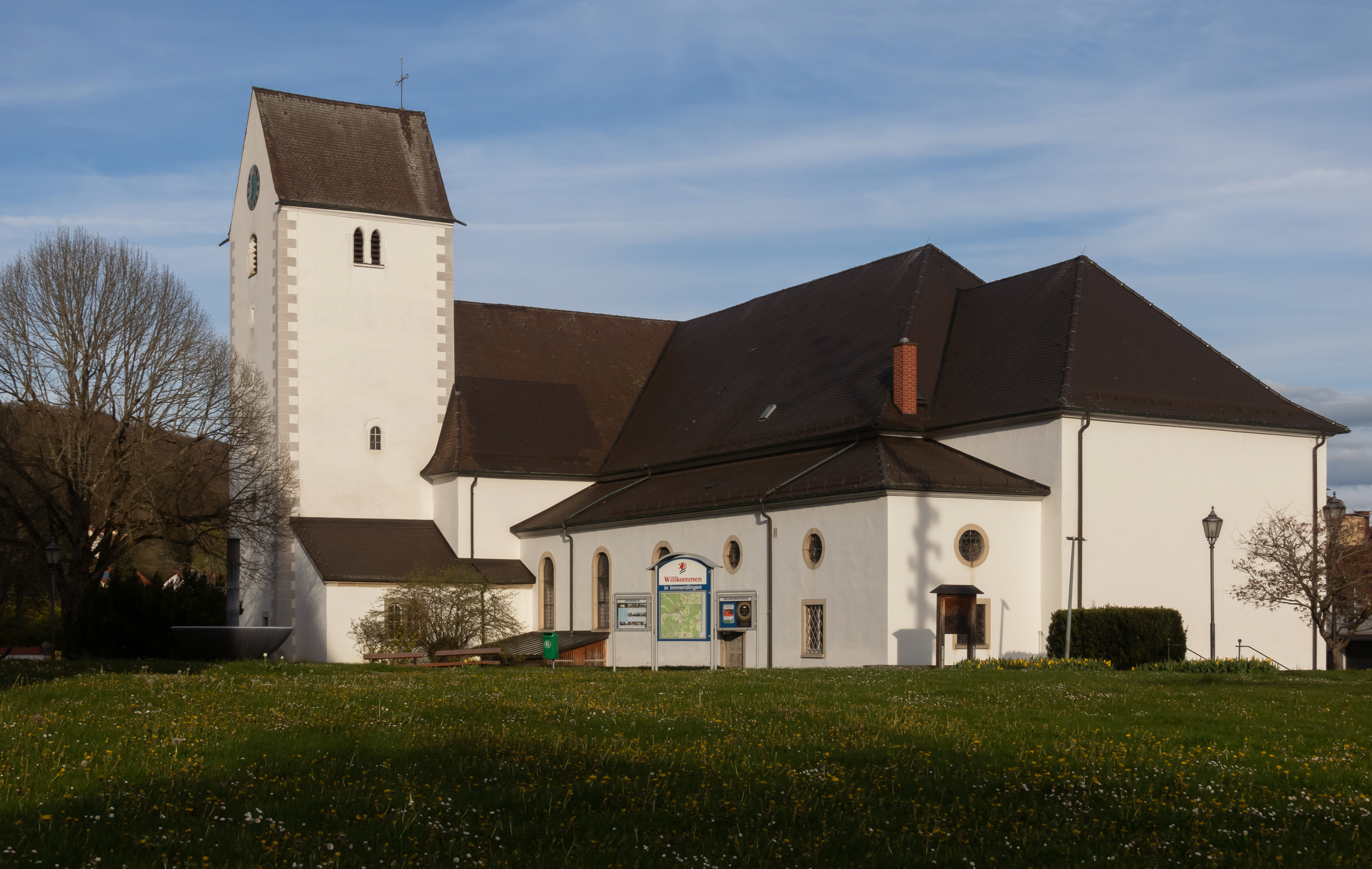
Immendingen, church: Kirche Sankt Peter und Paul

Immendingen is a municipality in the district of Tuttlingen in Baden-Württemberg in Germany located on the Upper Danube. It is famous for the Danube Sinkhole.

== Geography ==
Immendingen is located on the Upper Danube. On the municipal area are parts of the Danube Sinkhole.

With the mountain Höwenegg in Immendingen begins the extinct volcanic landscape of Hegau. Archaeological excavations at the Höwenegg recover saber-toothed tigers, antelopes and one of the few well preserved ancestral horses.

The municipality borders Talheim to the north, Tuttlingen to the east, Emmingen-Liptingen to the southeast, Engen to the south, and Geisingen and Bad Durrheim to the west.

The whole municipality with the previously independent municipalities Hattingen, Hintschingen, Ippingen, Mauenheim and Zimmern include 22 villages, hamlets, farms and houses.

Coat of arms of several incorporated municipalities

Hattingen	Hintschingen	Ippingen	Mauenheim	Zimmern

== History ==
Immendingen was built at the crossroads of ancient trade routes. As the name suggests, it was a settlement of the alemannic period. The name goes back to an Alemannic patriarch, who settled with his family in the valley of the Danube.

The first documentary evidence dates back to 1101.

In the Carolingian period, the village belonged to the Aitrach to Hegau and was assigned to the Baar in the 12th century. Originally owned by the Counts of Zollern the area eventually became part of the Zähringers. In 1250 it was taken over by the Count of Fürstenberg. Many centuries are dominated by local lords living in the community. Significant gender of the local lords were the lords of Schreckenstein (on the „Upper Castle“) and the lords of Reischach (on the „Lower Castle“).

In the course of municipal reform in Baden-Württemberg, the hitherto separate municipality Zimmern was incorporated on 1 January 1971. On 1 December 1971, the incorporation of Mauenheim was. Hattingen, Hintschingen and Ippingen were incorporated on December 1, 1974.

In December 1958 the barracks „Oberfeldwebel-Schreiber-Kaserne“ was built. According to the current stationing concept of the Bundeswehr the barracks will be closed in the third quarter of 2016. The 3rd French hussar regiment of the Franco-German Brigade was based in barracks from 1996 to 2011.

== Culture and sights ==
The municipality is member of the tourism association „Donaubergland“.

=== Buildings ===
- The Upper Castle from the 12th century, now serves as the town hall.
- The Lower Castle from the 13th century served the former „Immendinger Gießerei und Maschinenfabrik GmbH“ (foundry and machine factory) as a production facility.
- The covered wooden bridge over the Danube in Zimmern
- Bachzimmerer Tal (coal pile)
- The Benedictine monastery „Amtenhausen“

=== Natural Monuments ===
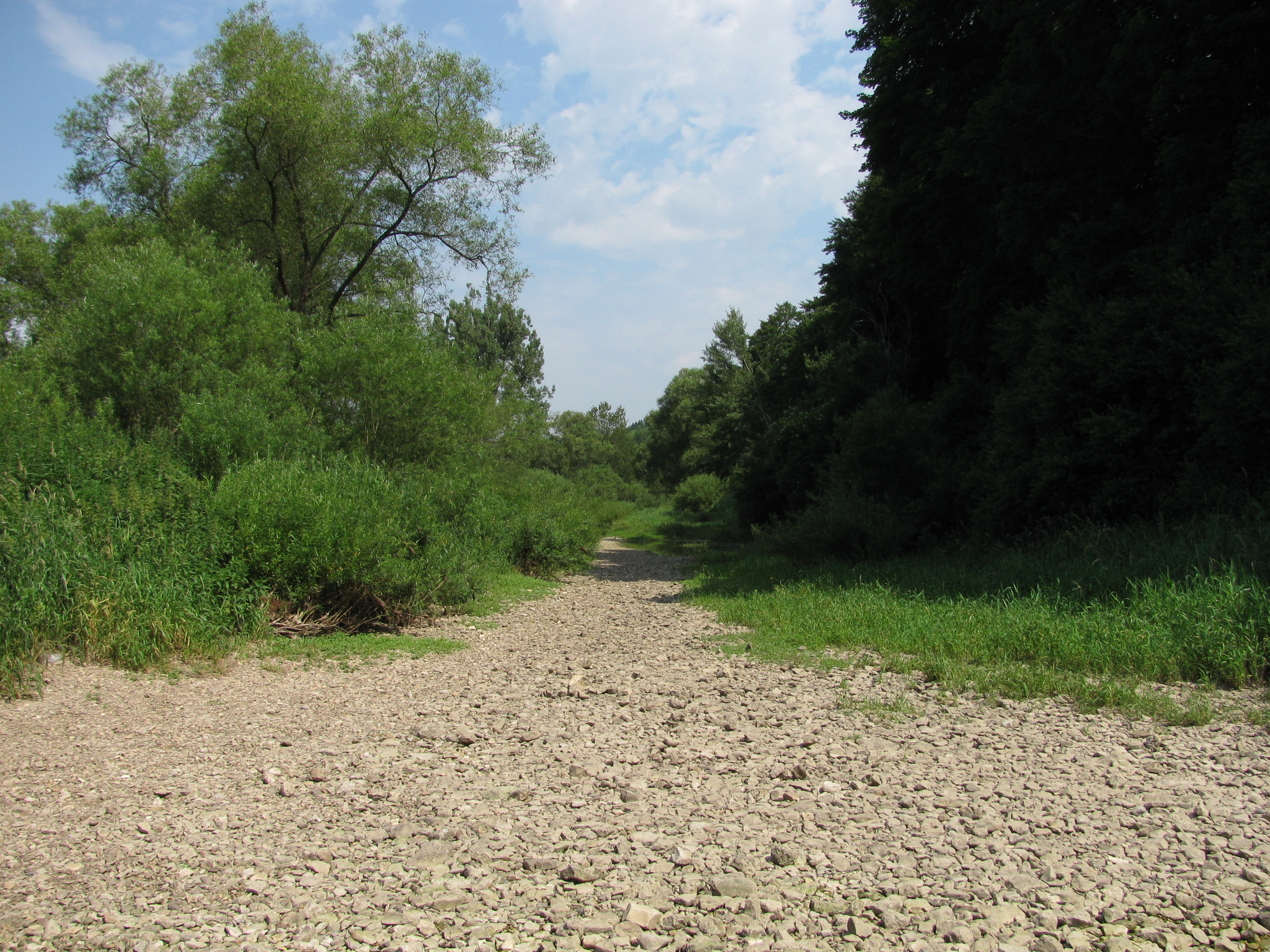
Danube Sinkhole: In the dry riverbed of the Danube

- Danube Sinkhole
- Nature reserve Höwenegg

=== Regular events ===
- Schlossfest Immendingen (Castle festivity); every two years
- Christmas market of the Bund der Selbständigen (Union of the self-employed); every year
- Trade exhibition of the Bund der Selbständigen (Union of the self-employed); every four years

== Notable people ==
- Ludwig Freiherr Roth von Schreckenstein (1789-1858), Prussian general
