= Hegau =

Area in southern Germany

Coordinates: 47.795°N 8.750°E

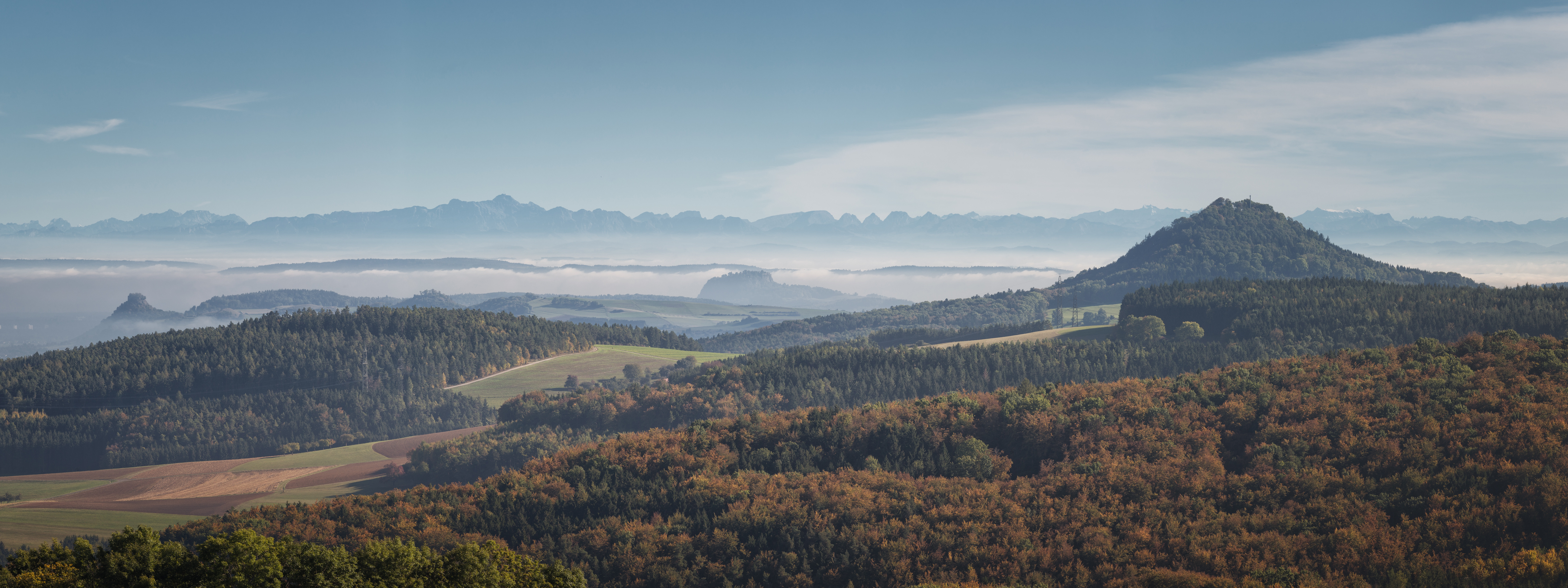
- Area: 306 km²
- Classification: Handbook of Natural Region Divisions of Germany
- Highest point: 867.2 m (2,845 ft)
- County/District: Konstanz district, Tuttlingen district, Schwarzwald-Baar
- State(s): Baden-Württemberg
- Country: Germany

Hegau (German pronunciation: [ˈheːɡaʊ]) either refers to a region of the Duchy of Swabia or to only that part of said region which is presently located in the country of Germany. It is known for its extinct, partly eroded volcanoes, most of which are crowned with ruins of medieval fortresses.

Historically, Hegau was a Gau of the Duchy of Swabia, first mentioned in 787 A.D. in the Latinised form in pago Egauinsse. Its area reached from the Überlinger See of Lake Constance and the city of Konstanz in the east to the Randen and Schaffhausen in the present-day Swiss canton of Schaffhausen in the west. Towards south, it extended to the High Rhine and to the north until the Danube.

Today, Hegau refers only to that part of the former Gau which is located within the German state of Baden-Württemberg. This region, also called the Hegauer Kegelbergland (lit. 'Hegau conical hill landscape'), is a Young Drift morainic landscape marked by the remains of several extinct volcanoes, the Hegau volcanoes, which are located mostly to the west and east of the line from Singen (Hohentwiel) in the south to Geisingen in the north. The Hegau volcanoes are national geotopes of Germany.

== Origin of the landscape ==
The Hegau region, situated at about 400 m (1,300 ft) a.s.l., is surmounted by nearly a dozen conical hills, which are between 643 m (2,110 ft) and 867 m (2,844 ft) high and which correspond to the remains of the pipes of past volcanoes. The area was volcanically active during the Miocene epoch. Much later, during the Riss glaciation (Pleistocene epoch), about 150 ka ago, the Hegau region was covered by large glaciers, which over time eroded the softer rocks around the harder basaltic rocks of the former volcanic pipes (an example of an inverted relief). After the melting of the ice age glaciers, the landscape received its typical, modern-day appearance.

In conjunction with the past volcanisms, several maars formed in the area, which later filled with water to form lakes. The sediments of these maar lakes preserve exceptional fossils, for example of the early horse Hippotherium primigenium or of the giant salamander Andrias scheuchzeri.

During the Middle Ages, fortresses were built on top of several Hegau volcanoes.

The arguably best-known of the Hegau volcanoes is the Hohentwiel, on top of which lie the ruins of a fortress of the same name. The Hohentwiel is located next to the industrial city of Singen. It is the southernmost of the Hegau volcanoes. To the north of it, there are nine other extinct volcanoes (see list below).

=== List of Hegau volcanoes ===
Mountain name	Altitude (a.s.l.)	Notes	Image
Blauer Stein	836 m (2,743 ft)	Located near the village of Randen (Blumberg); its name means "blue rock" in German	
Hohenhewen	843.7 m (2,768 ft)	Located near Engen, with fortress ruins on top	
Hohenkrähen	644 m (2,113 ft)	Located near Duchtlingen, with fortress ruins on top	
Hohenstoffeln	841.8 m (2,762 ft) / 832 m (2,730 ft)	Located between Binningen and Weiterdingen (Hilzingen), with double summit	
Hohentwiel	686 m (2,251 ft)	Located near Singen, with ruins of Hohentwiel Castle on top	
Höwenegg	798 m (2,618 ft)	Located south of Immendingen, with two fortress ruins on top	
Mägdeberg	654.2 m (2,146 ft)	Located near Mühlhausen-Ehingen, with fortress ruins on top	
Neuhewen	867.2 m (2,845 ft)	Located near Stetten (Engen), with fortress ruins on top	
Staufen	594 m (1,949 ft)	Located near Hilzingen, with fortress ruins on top	
Wartenberg	844.8 m (2,772 ft)	Located near Geisingen, the northernmost of the Hegau volcanoes	

== Rock gallery ==
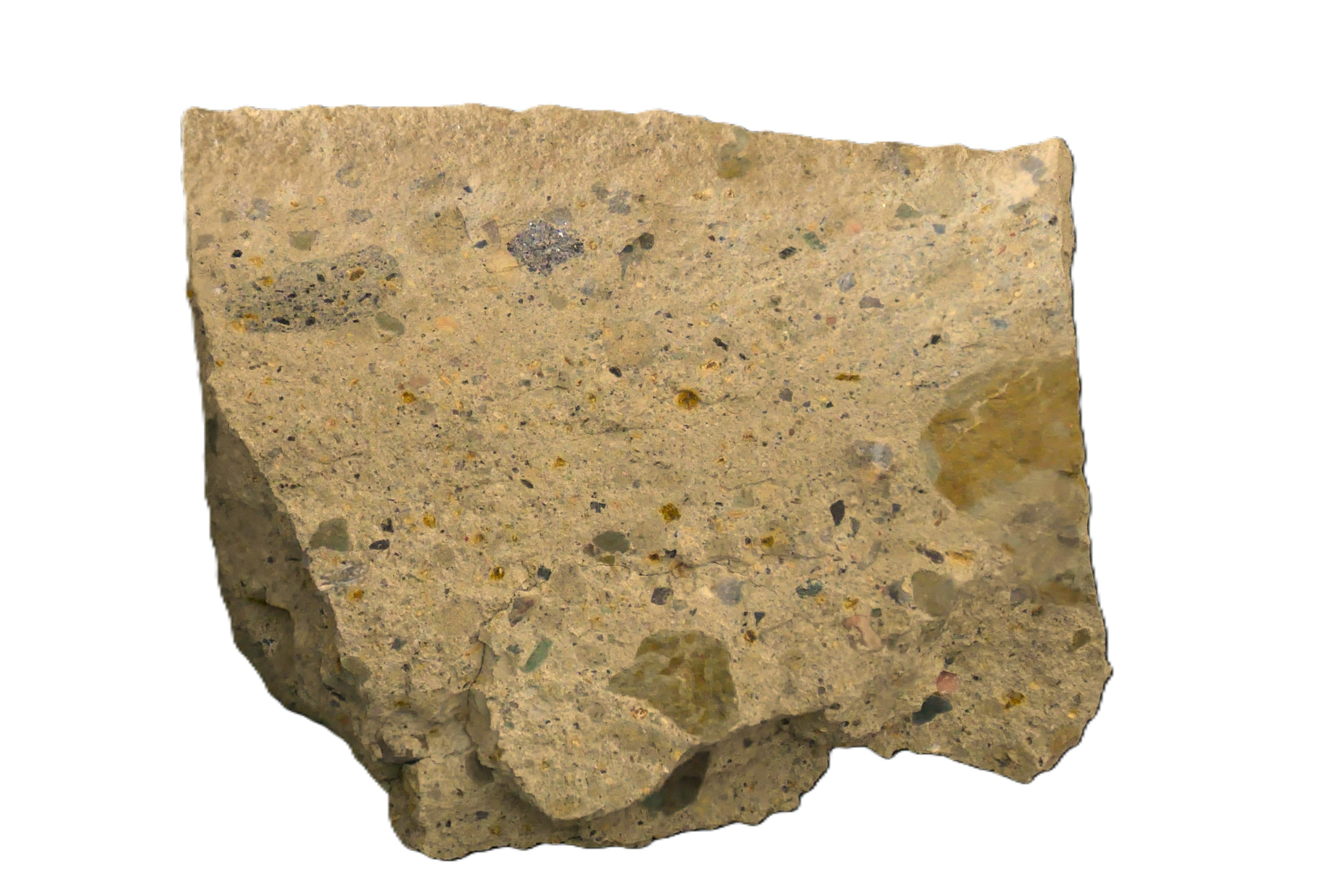
Tuffite from Rosenegg

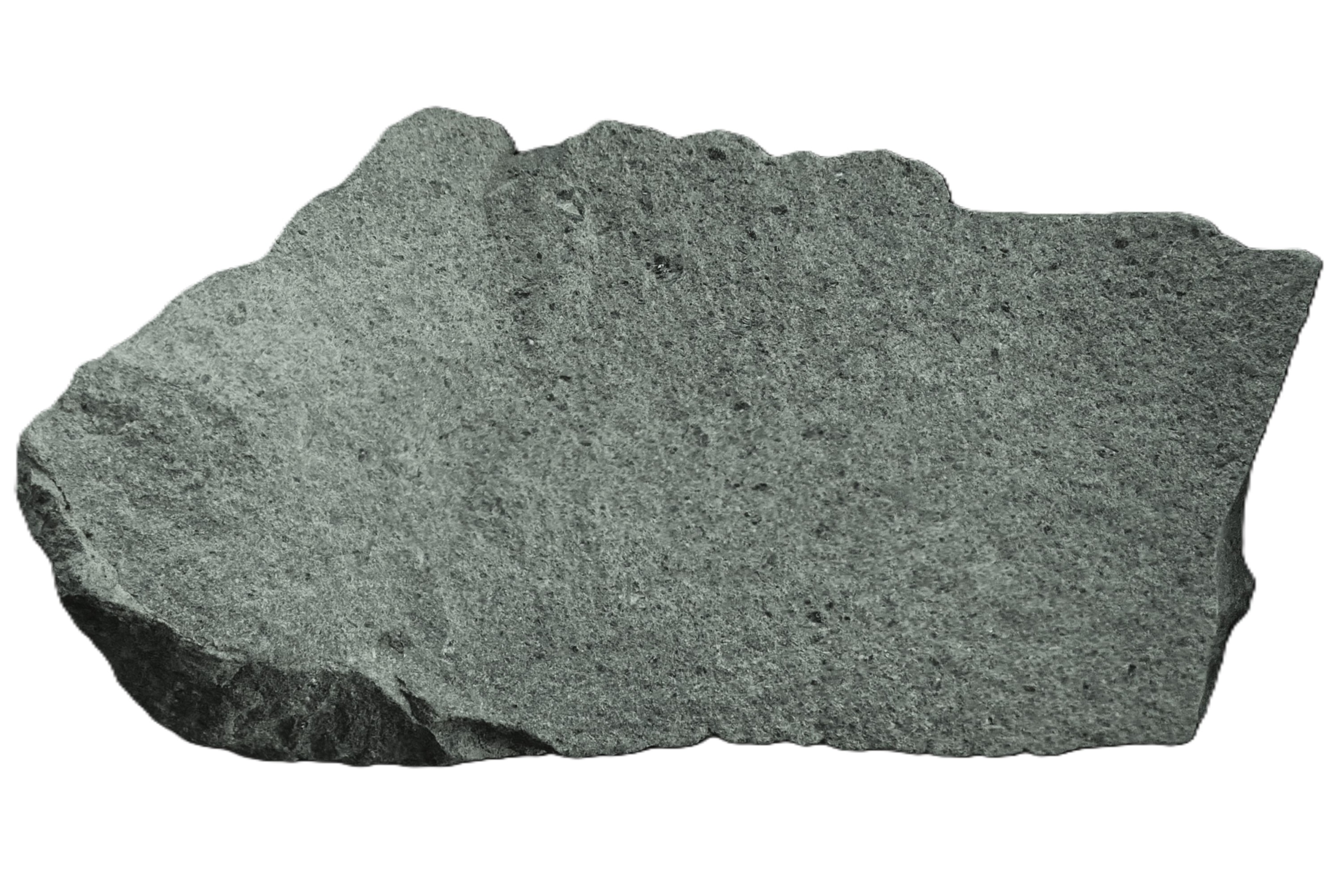
Melilitite from Hohenstoffeln

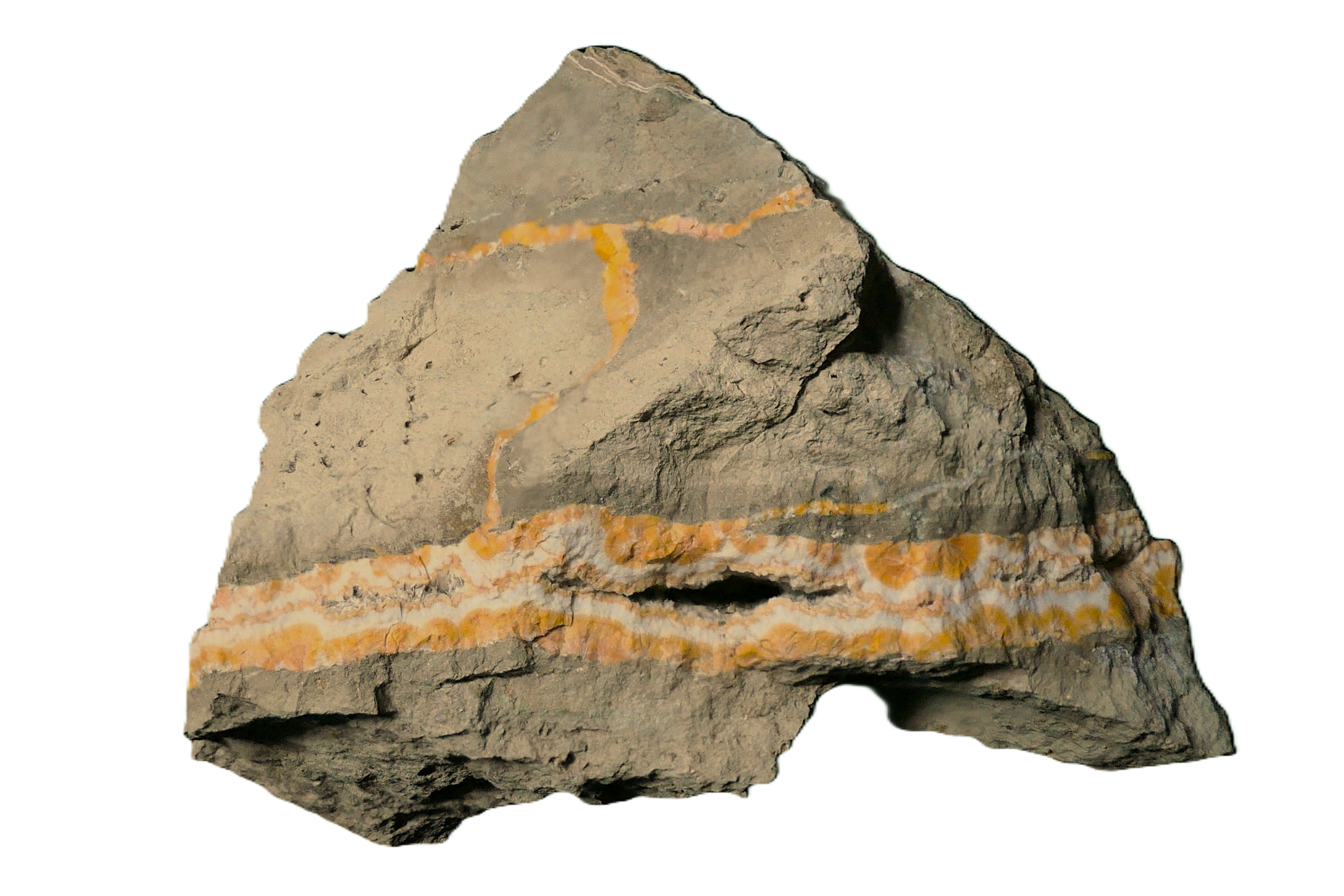
Phonolite from Hohentwiel

== See also ==
- Kaiserstuhl
