= Rosenegg (hill) =

Mountain in Baden-Württemberg, Germany

Coordinates: 47°44′08″N 8°49′05″E

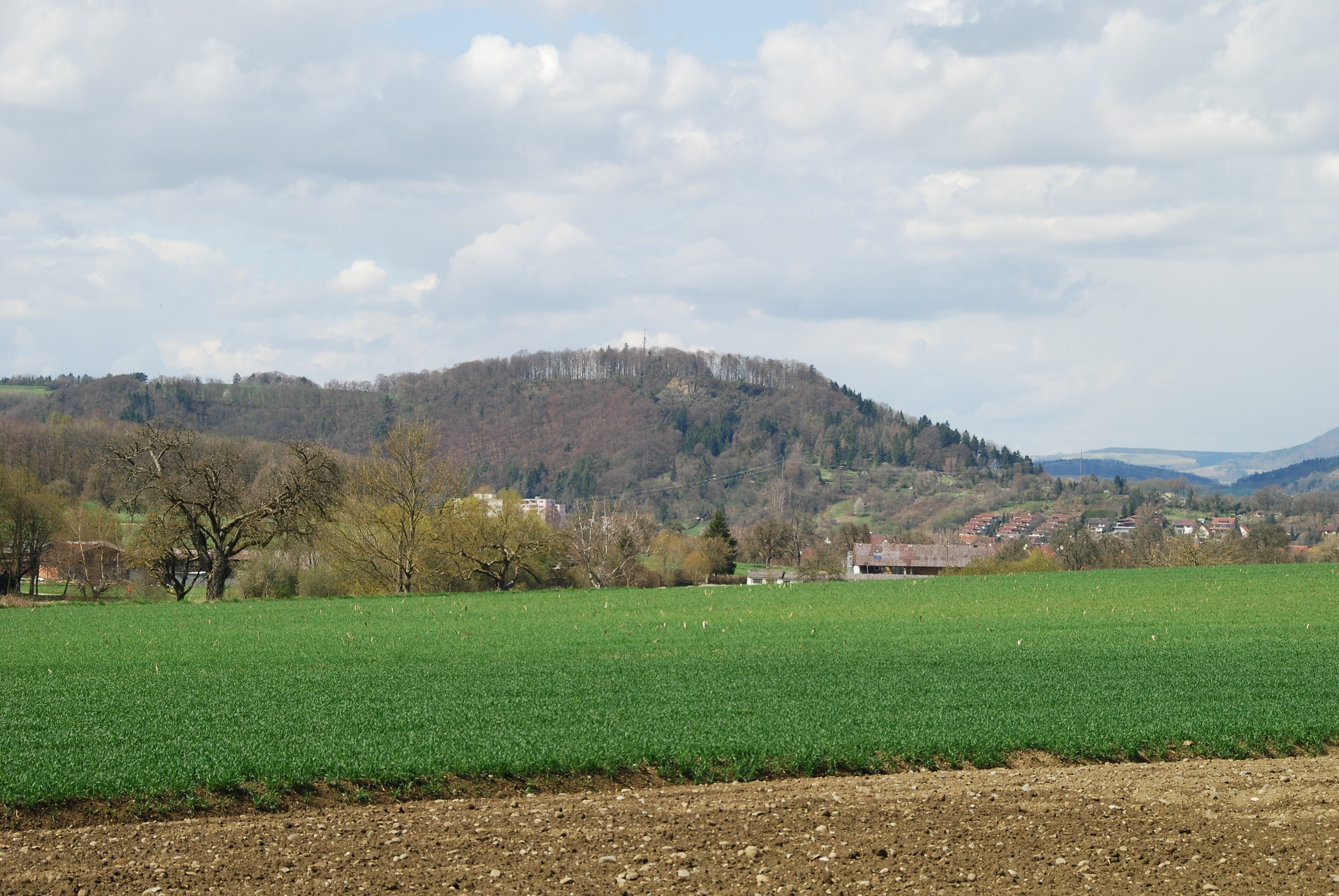

Highest point
- Elevation: 549 m (1,801 ft)

Geography
- Location: Baden-Württemberg, Germany

Rosenegg is a hill in Baden-Württemberg, Germany, located 2 miles east of the town of Gottmadingen.
