= Höwenegg =

Mountain in Baden-Württemberg, Germany

Coordinates: 47°54′52″N 8°44′30″E

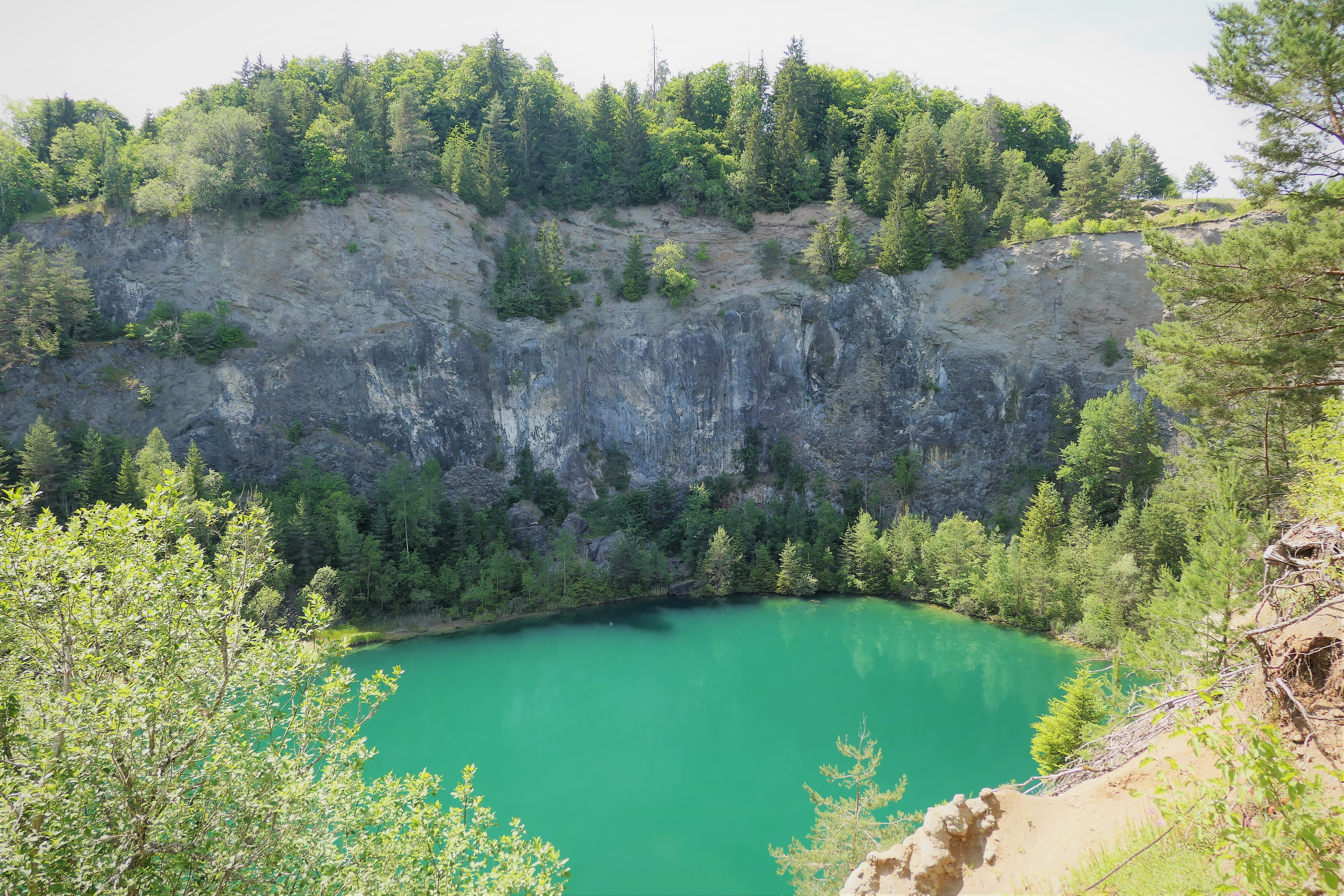
- Höwenegg

Highest point
- Elevation: 798 m (2,618 ft)

Geography
- Location: Immendingen, Baden-Württemberg, Germany

Höwenegg is a mountain of volcanic origin in the Hegau region (Tuttlingen district) of southern Baden-Württemberg, Germany.
