= Hohenstoffeln =

Mountain in Germany

Coordinates: 47°48′N 8°45′E

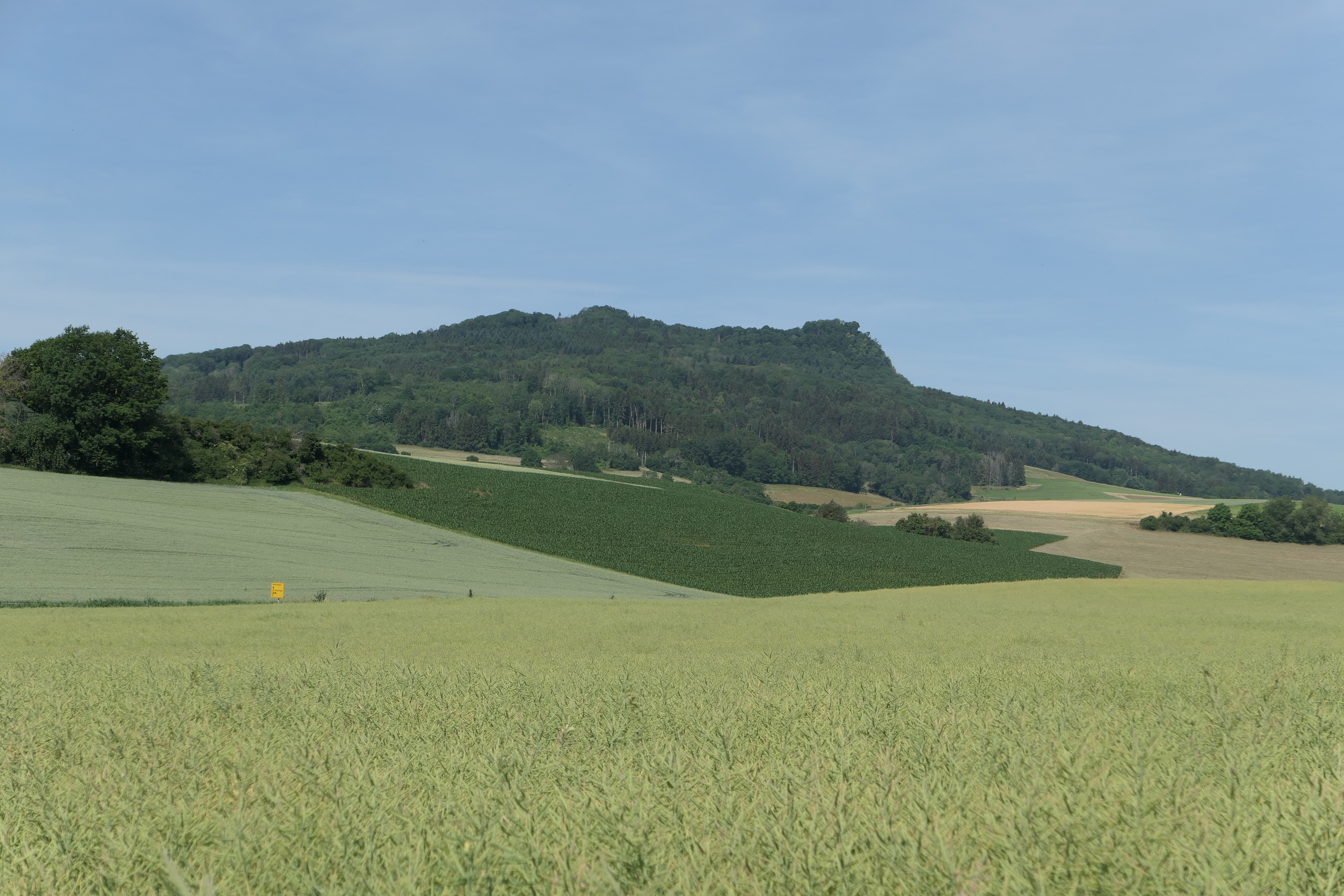
- Hohenstoffeln

Highest point
- Elevation: 844 m (2,769 ft)

Geography
- Location: Baden-Württemberg, Germany

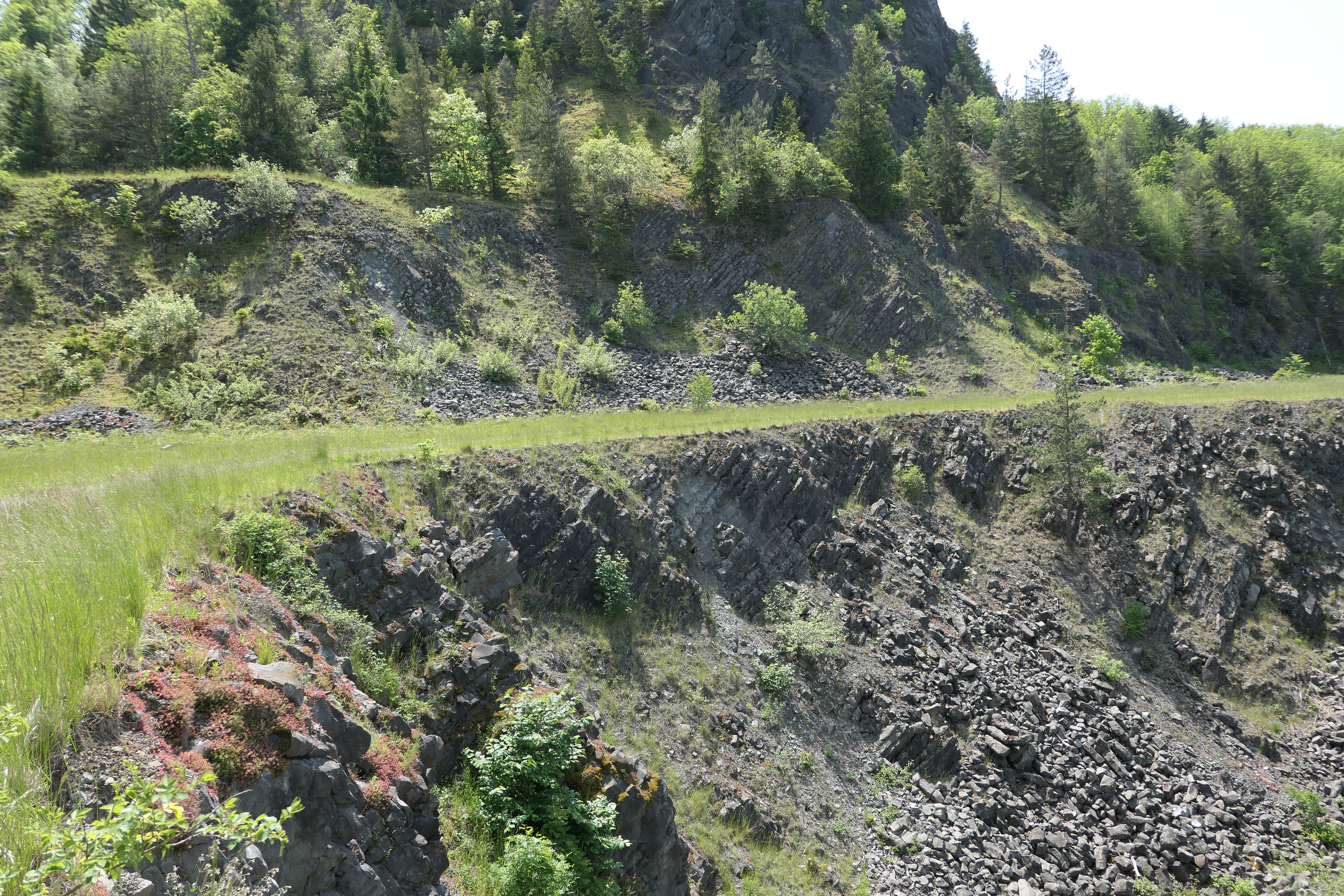
Former quarry at Hohenstoffeln

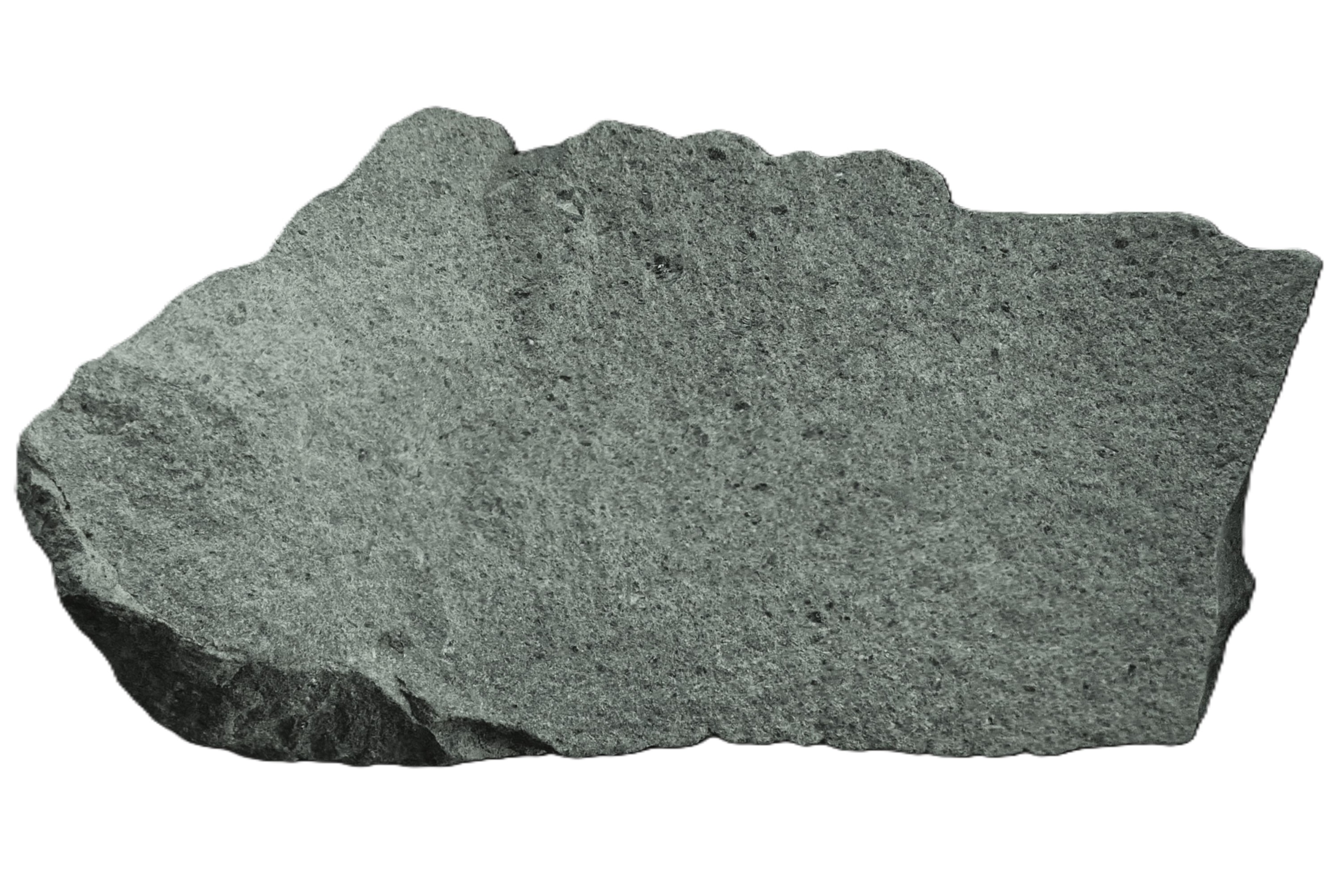
Melilitite from Hohenstoffeln

Hohenstoffeln is a double peaked mountain of volcanic origin in the Hegau region (Konstanz district) of southern Baden-Württemberg, Germany.
