= Mägdeberg =

Coordinates: 47°48′19″N 8°47′51″E

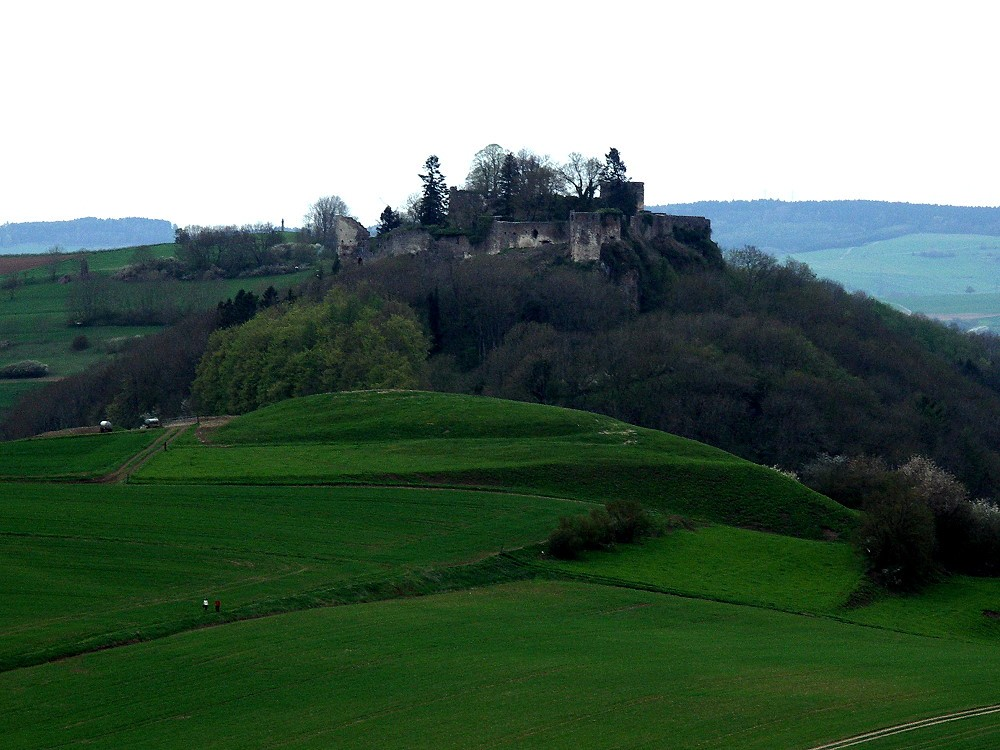

Highest point
- Elevation: 664 m (2,178 ft)

Geography
- Location: Baden-Württemberg, Germany

Mägdeberg is a mountain of volcanic origin in the Hegau region (Konstanz district) of southern Baden-Württemberg, Germany. The ruins of Mägdeberg Castle remain on top of it.
