= Lake Constance =

Lake in Germany, Switzerland and Austria

- Bodensee (German)
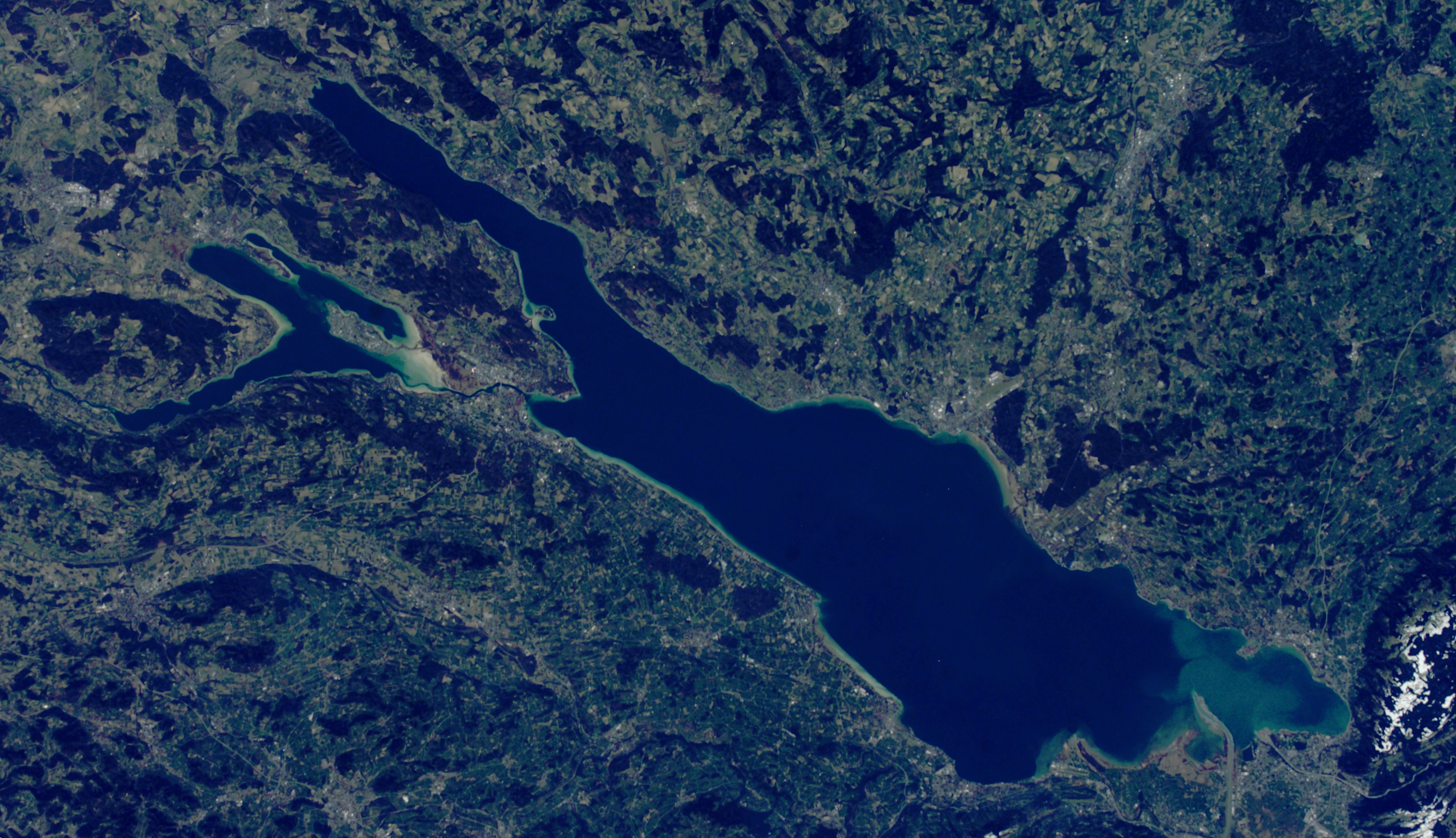
- Satellite image

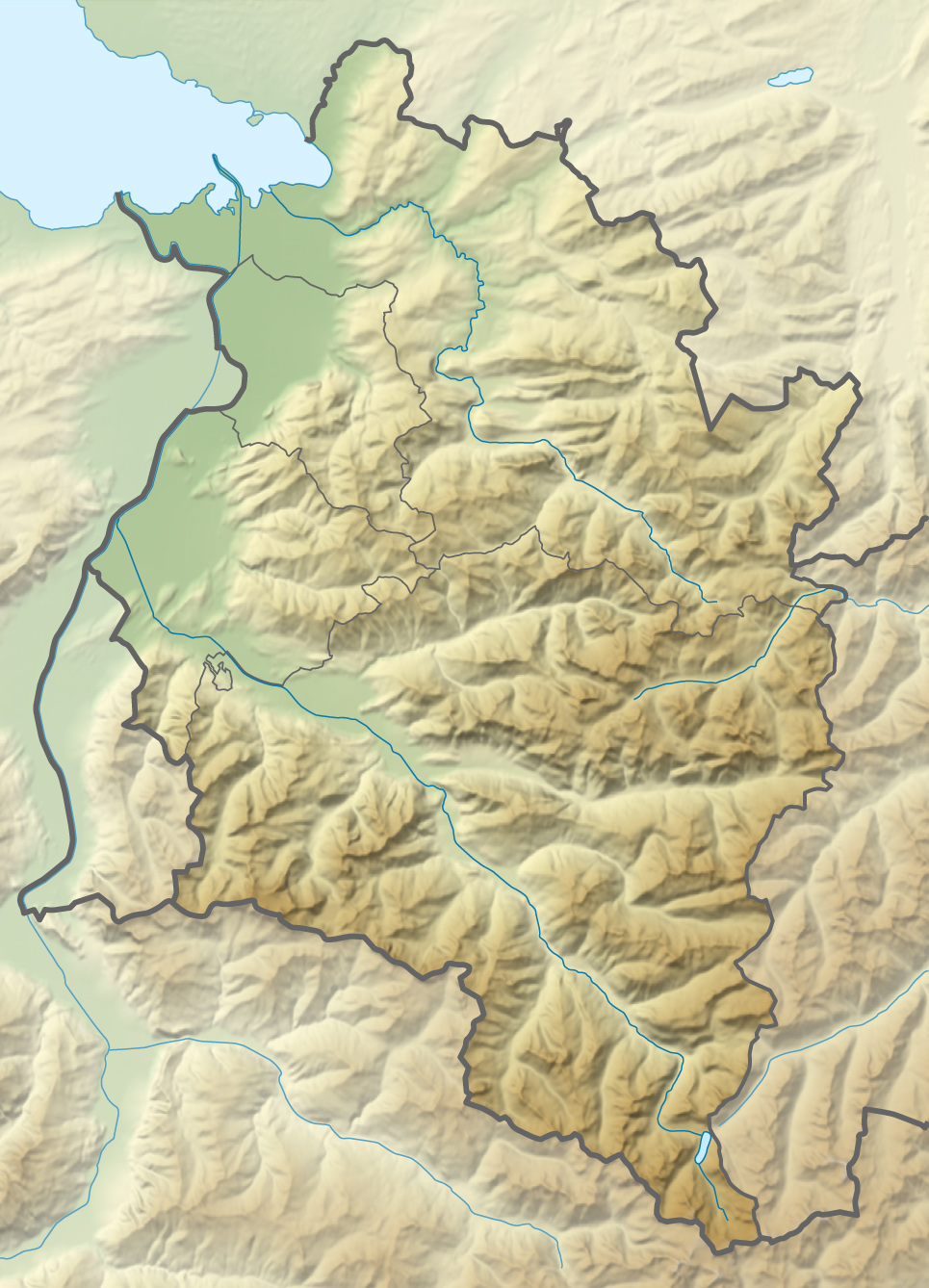
- Location within Alps Location within Canton of St. Gallen Location within Switzerland Location within Baden-Württemberg Location within Germany Location within Vorarlberg Location within Austria
- Interactive map of Lake Constance
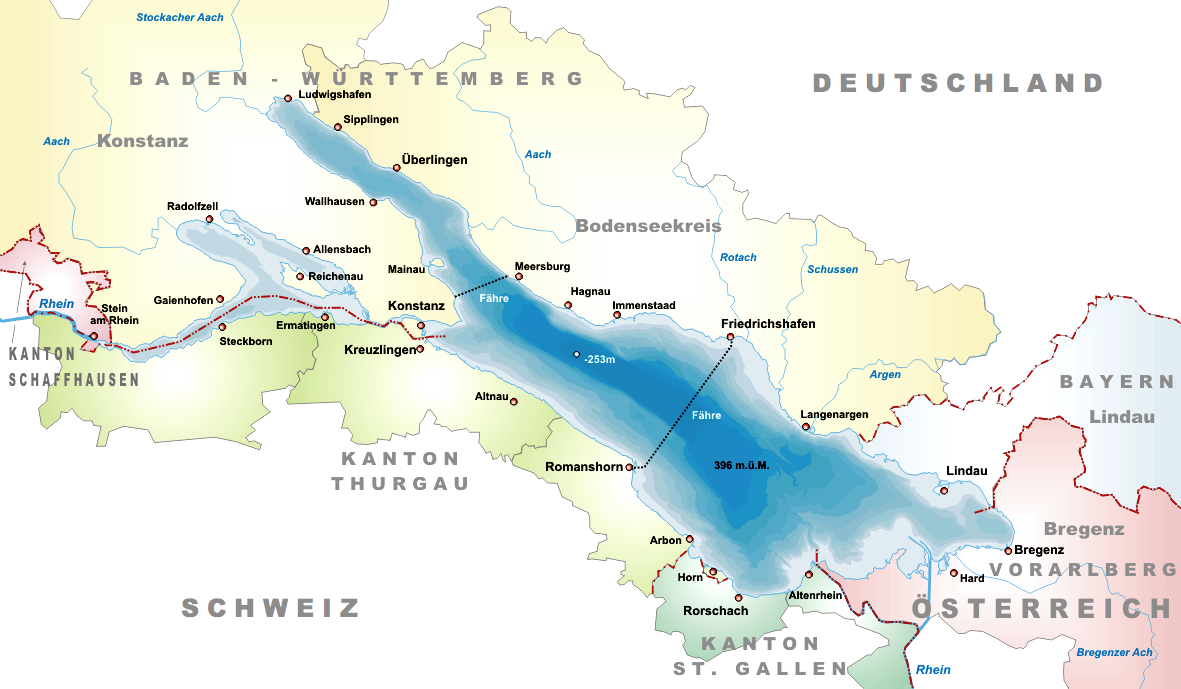
- Map
- Location: Germany, Switzerland, Austria
- Coordinates: 47°35′N 9°28′E
- Type: glacial lake
- Part of: Rhine
- Primary inflows: Alpine Rhine
- Primary outflows: High Rhine
- Catchment area: 11,500 km^{2} (4,400 sq mi)
- Basin countries: Germany, Switzerland, Austria
- Max. length: 63 km (39 mi)
- Max. width: 14 km (8.7 mi)
- Surface area: 536 km^{2} (207 sq mi)
- Average depth: 90 m (300 ft)
- Max. depth: 251 m (823 ft)
- Water volume: 48 km^{3} (12 cu mi; 39,000,000 acre⋅ft)
- Residence time: 4.3 years
- Shore length^{1}: 273 km (170 mi)
- Surface elevation: 395 m (1,296 ft)
- Frozen: 1795, 1830, 1880 (partial), 1963
- Islands: Mainau; Reichenau; Lindau; and others
- Sections/sub-basins: Obersee; Überlinger See; Seerhein; Untersee; Gnadensee; Markelfinger Winkel; Zeller See; Rheinsee
- Settlements: see list
- ^{1} Shore length is not a well-defined measure.

Lake Constance (German: Bodensee, pronounced [ˈboːdn̩zeː]) refers to three bodies of water on the Rhine at the northern foot of the Alps: Upper Lake Constance (Obersee), Lower Lake Constance (Untersee), and a connecting stretch of the Rhine, called the Seerhein (lit. 'Rhine of the lake(s)'). These water bodies lie within the Lake Constance Basin (Bodenseebecken) in the Alpine Foreland through which the Rhine flows. The nearby Mindelsee is not considered part of Lake Constance. The lake is situated where Germany, Switzerland, and Austria meet. Its shorelines lie in the German states of Baden-Württemberg and Bavaria; the Swiss cantons of St. Gallen, Thurgau, and Schaffhausen; and the Austrian state of Vorarlberg. The actual location of the country borders within the lake has never been cleared by Austria, Germany and Switzerland. There are several interest groups related to the lake's issues governed by members of all involved nations.

The Alpine Rhine forms, in its original course (Alter Rhein), the Austro-Swiss border and flows into the lake from the south. The High Rhine flows westbound out of the lake and forms (with the exception of the Canton of Schaffhausen, Rafzerfeld and Basel-Stadt) the German-Swiss border as far as to the city of Basel. The Leiblach forms the Austria–Germany border east of the lake.

The most populous towns on the Upper Lake are Constance (German: Konstanz), Friedrichshafen, Bregenz, Lindau, Überlingen and Kreuzlingen. The largest town on the Lower Lake is Radolfzell. The largest islands are Reichenau in the Lower Lake, and Lindau and Mainau in the Upper Lake. Bodanrück, a large peninsula, separates the Upper and Lower Lake.

While in English and in the Romance languages, the lake is named after the city of Constance from Roman emperor Constantius II, the German name derives from the village of Bodman (municipality of Bodman-Ludwigshafen), in the northwesternmost corner of the lake.

== Description ==
Lake Constance is located along the Rhine between the Alpine Rhine, its main tributary, and the High Rhine, its outflow. It is the third largest freshwater lake by surface area in Central and Western Europe (and the second largest in volume), after Lake Geneva and (in surface area) Lake Balaton.

It is 63 km (39 mi) long, and, nearly 14 km (8.7 mi) at its widest point. It covers about 536 km^{2} (207 sq mi), and is 395 m (1,296 ft) above sea level. Its greatest depth is 252 metres (827 ft), exactly in the middle of the Upper Lake. Its volume is about 48 km^{3} (12 cu mi).

The lake has two parts. The main east section, called Obersee or "Upper Lake", covers about 473 square kilometres (183 sq mi), including its northwestern arm, the Überlinger See (61 km^{2} (24 sq mi)); the smaller west section, called Untersee or "Lower Lake", covers an area of about 63 square kilometres (24 sq mi).

The connection between these two lakes is the Seerhein (lit.: "Rhine of the Lake(s)"). Geographically, usually it is not considered to be part of the lake, but a very short river.

The Lower Lake Constance is loosely divided into three sections around the Island of Reichenau. The two German parts, the Gnadensee (lit.: "calm lake") north of the island and north of the peninsula of Mettnau (the Markelfinger Winkel), and the Zeller See, south of Radolfzell and to the northwest of the Reichenau island, and the mainly Swiss Rheinsee (lit.: "Lake Rhine") – not to be mistaken for the Seerhein (lit.: "Rhine of the Lake(s)") at its start – to the south of the island and with its southwestern arm leading to its effluent in Stein am Rhein.

The water of the regulated Alpine Rhine flows into the lake in the southeast near Bregenz, Austria, then through the Upper Lake Constance hardly targeting the Überlinger See, into the Seerhein in the town of Konstanz, then through the Rheinsee virtually without feeding both German parts of the Lower Lake, and finally feeds the start of the High Rhine in Swiss town Stein am Rhein.

The lake itself is an important source of drinking water for southwestern Germany.

The culminating point of the lake's drainage basin is the Swiss peak Piz Russein of the Tödi massif of the Glarus Alps at 3,613 metres (11,854 ft) above sea level. It starts with the creek Aua da Russein (lit.: "Water of the Russein").

== History ==
Lake Constance was formed by the Rhine Glacier during the Quaternary glaciation ice age and is a Zungenbecken or Tongue lake. After the end of the last glacial period, about 10,000 years ago, the Obersee and Untersee still formed a single lake. The downward erosion of the High Rhine caused the lake level to gradually sink and a sill, the Konstanzer Schwelle, to emerge.

The Rhine, the Bregenzer Ach, and the Dornbirner Ach carry sediments from the Alps to the lake, thus gradually decreasing the depth and reducing the extension of the lake in the southeast.

In antiquity, the two lakes had different names; later, for reasons which are unknown, they came to have the same name.

In the 19th century, there were five different local time zones around Lake Constance. Constance, belonging to the Grand Duchy of Baden, adhered to Karlsruhe time, Friedrichshafen used the time of the Duchy of Württemberg, in Lindau, the Bavarian Munich time was observed, and Bregenz used Prague time, while the Swiss shore used Berne time. One would have needed to travel only 46 kilometres (29 mi) to visit five time zones. Given the amount of trade and traffic over Lake Constance, this led to serious confusion. Public clocks in harbors used three different clock faces, depending on the destinations offered by the boat companies. In 1892, all German territories used CET, the Austrian railways had already introduced CET the previous year and Switzerland followed in 1894. Because traffic timetables had not been yet updated, CET became the sole valid time around and on Lake Constance in 1895.

=== Name ===
The earliest recorded reference to the lakes is by Roman geographer Pomponius Mela around AD 43, calling the upper lake Lacus Venetus and the lower lake Lacus Acronius, the Rhine passing through both. Around AD 75, the naturalist Pliny the Elder called them both Lacus Raetiae Brigantinus after the main Roman town on the lake, Brigantium (later Bregenz). This name is associated with the Celtic Brigantii who lived here, although it is not clear whether the place was named after the tribe or the inhabitants of the region were named after their main settlement. Ammianus Marcellinus later used the form Lacus Brigantiae.

The current German name of Bodensee derives from the place name Bodman, which probably originally derived from the Old High German bodamon which meant "on the soils", indicating a place on level terrain by the lake. This place, situated at the west end of Lake Überlingen (Überlinger See), had a more supraregional character for a certain period in the early Middle Ages as a Frankish imperial palace (Königspfalz), Alamannian ducal seat and mint, which is why the name may have been transferred to the lake which Bodman is situated (Bodmansee, "Bodman's lake"). From 833 or 834, the place name appears in Latin sources as form lacus potamicus and the Bodman Pfalz Latinised as Potamum; but monastic scholars like Walahfrid Strabo wrongly assumed Potamum to be derived from the Greek word ποταμός potamos for "river" and meant "river lake". They may also have been influenced by the fact that the Rhine flowed through the lake.

Wolfram von Eschenbach describes it in Middle High German as the Bodemensee or Bodemsee which has finally evolved into the present German name, Bodensee. The name may be linked to that of the Bodanrück, the hill range between Lake Überlingen and the Lower Lake, and the history of the House of Bodman. The German name of the lake, Bodensee, has been adopted by many other languages, for example: Dutch: Bodenmeer, Danish: Bodensøen, Norwegian: Bodensjøen, Swedish: Bodensjön, Finnish: Bodenjärvi, Russian: Боденское озеро, Polish: Jezioro Bodeńskie, Czech: Bodamské jezero, Slovak: Bodamské jazero, Hungarian: Bodeni-tó, Serbo-Croatian: Bodensko jezero, Albanian: Liqeni i Bodenit.

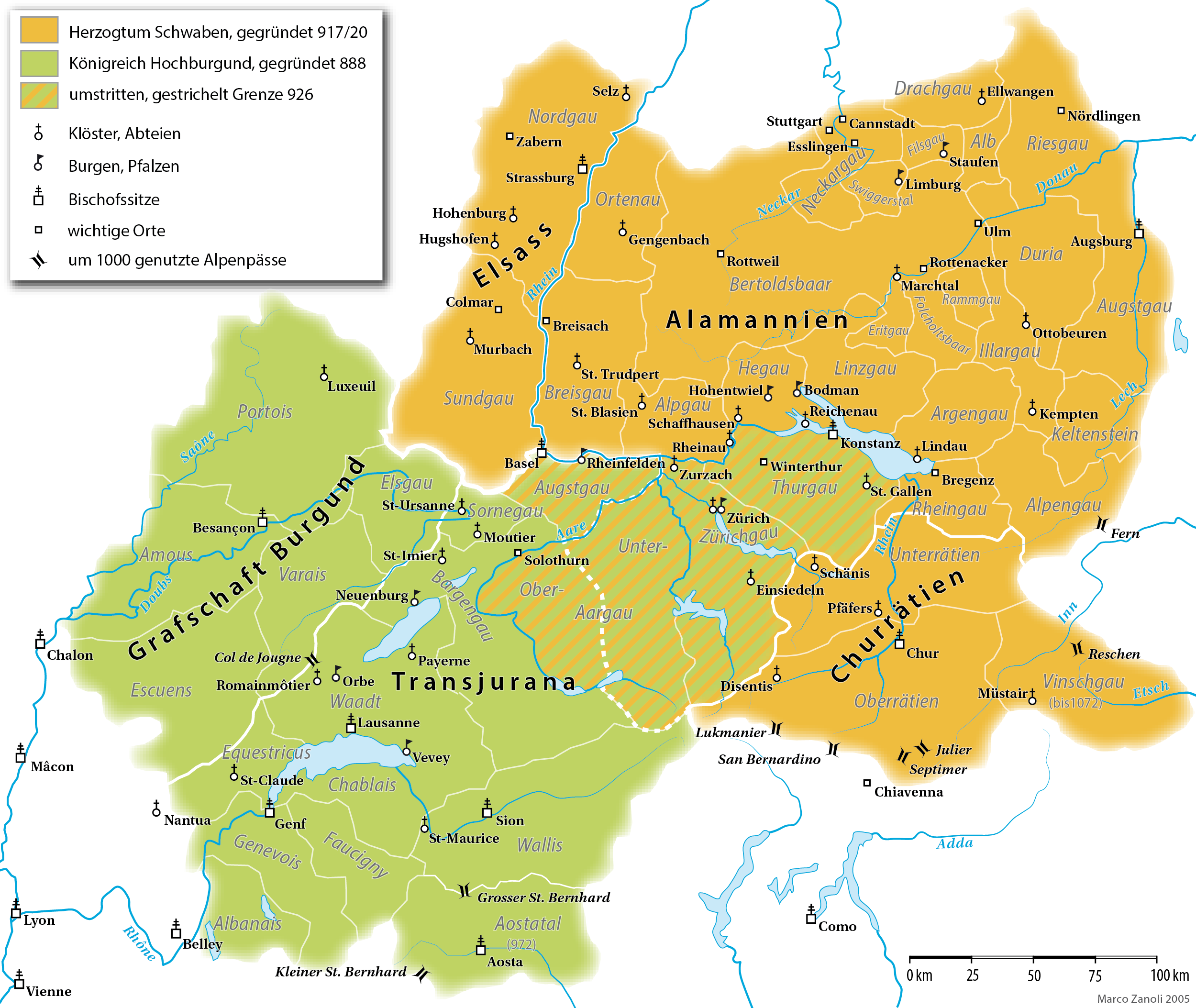
Location of Lake Constance within the Duchy of Swabia (yellow), 911–1268

After the Council of Constance in the 15th century, the alternative name Lacus Constantinus was used in the (Roman Catholic) Romance language area. This name, which had been attested as early as 1187 in the form Lacus Constantiensis, came from the town of Konstanz at the outflow of the Rhine from the Obersee, whose original name, Constantia, was in turn derived from the Roman emperor, Constantius Chlorus (around 300 AD). (Note: Hence: French: Lac de Constance; Italian: Lago di Costanza; Portuguese: Lago de Constança; Spanish: Lago de Constanza; Romanian: Lacul Constanța; Greek: Λίμνη της Κωνσταντίας, romanized: Limni tis Konstantias; Arabic: بحيرة كونستانس, romanized: buḥayrat Konstans; Turkish: Konstanz gölü)

Even in Romance-influenced English the name "Lake Constance" gained a foothold and was then exported into other languages such as Hebrew: ימת קונסטנץ yamat Konstanz and Swahili: Ziwa la Konstanz. In many languages both forms exist in parallel e.g. Romansh: Lai da Constanza and Lai Bodan, Esperanto: Konstanca Lago and Bodenlago.

The poetic name, "Swabian Sea", was adopted by authors of the early modern era and the Enlightenment from ancient authors, possibly Tacitus. However, this assumption was based on an error (similar to that of the Teutoburg Forest and the Taunus): the Romans sometimes used the name Mare Suebicum for the Baltic Sea, not Lake Constance. In times when the Romans had located the so-called "Suebi", then an Elbe Germanic tribe near a sea, this was understandable. The authors of the Early Modern Period overlooked this and adopted the name for the largest lake in the middle of the former Duchy of Swabia, which also included parts of today's Switzerland. Today the name Swabian Sea (Schwäbisches Meer) is only used jocularly as a hyperbolic term for Lake Constance.

=== Key facts ===
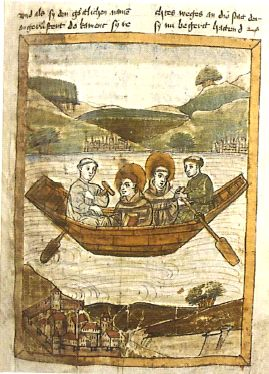
Saints Columbanus and Gallus on Lake Constance, from a 15th-century manuscript

No Paleolithic finds have been made in the immediate vicinity of the lake, because the region of Lake Constance was long covered by the Rhine Glacier. The discovery of stone tools (microliths) indicate that hunters and gatherers of the Mesolithic period (Middle Stone Age, 8,000–5,500 BC) frequented the area without settling, however. Only hunting camps have been confirmed. The earliest Neolithic farmers, who belonged to the Linear Pottery culture, also left no traces behind, because the Alpine foreland lay away from the routes along which they had spread during the 6th millennium BC. This changed only in the middle and late Neolithic when shore settlements were established, the so-called pile dwelling and wetland settlements, which have now been uncovered mainly on Lake Überlingen, the Constance Hopper and on the Obersee. At Unteruhldingen, a pile dwelling village has been reconstructed, and now forms an open air museum. In 2015, a 20 km line of about 170 man-made under-water stone mounds dated in the Neolithic period or early Bronze Age was discovered on the south-west shore of the lake between Bottighofen and Romanshorn.

Grave finds from Singen am Hohentwiel to the north date to the beginning of the Early Bronze Age and shore settlements were repeatedly built during the Neolithic Period and the Bronze Age (up to 800 BC). During the following Iron Age the settlement history is interrupted. The settlement of the shore of Lake Constance during the Hallstatt period is attested by grave mounds, which today are usually found in forests where they have been protected from the destruction by agriculture. Since the late Hallstatt period, the peoples living on Lake Constance are referred to as the Celts. During the La Tène period from 450 BC, the population density decreases, as can be deduced partly due from the fact that no more grave mounds were built. For the first time, written reports on Lake Constance have survived. Thus, we learn that the Helvetians settled by the lake in the south, the Rhaetians in the area of the Alpine Rhine Valley and the Vindelici in the north-east. The most important places on the lake were Bregenz (Celtic Brigantion) and today's Constance.

In the course of the Roman Alpine campaign of 16/15 BC, the Lake Constance region was integrated into the Roman Empire. During the campaign, there was also supposed to have been a battle on Lake Constance. The geographer, Pomponius Mela, makes the first mention in 43 AD of Lake Constance as two lakes – the Lacus Venetus (Upper Lake) and the Lacus Acronius (Untersee) – with the Rhine flowing through both. Pliny the Elder referred to Lake Constance as Lacus Brigantinus for the first time. The most important Roman site was Bregenz, which soon became subject to Roman municipal law and later became the seat of the Prefect of the Lake Constance fleet. The Romans were also in Lindau, but settled only on the hills around Lindau as the lakeshore was swampy. Other Roman towns were Constantia (Constance) and Arbor Felix (Arbon).

After the borders of the Roman Empire were drawn back to the Rhine boundary in the 3rd century AD, the Alamanni gradually settled on the north shore of Lake Constance and, later, on the south bank as well. After the introduction of Christianity, the cultural significance of the region grew as a result of the founding of Reichenau Abbey and the Bishopric of Constance. Under the rule of the Hohenstaufens, Imperial Diets (Reichstage) were held by Lake Constance. In Constance, too, a treaty was drawn up between the Hohenstaufen emperor and the Lombard League. Lake Constance also played an important role as a trading post for goods being traded between German and Italian states.

During the Thirty Years' War, there were various conflicts over the control of the region during the Lake War (1632–1648).

After the War of the Second Coalition (1798–1802), which also affected the region and during which Austrian and French flotillas operated on Lake Constance, there was a reorganisation of state relationships.

=== Historical maps ===
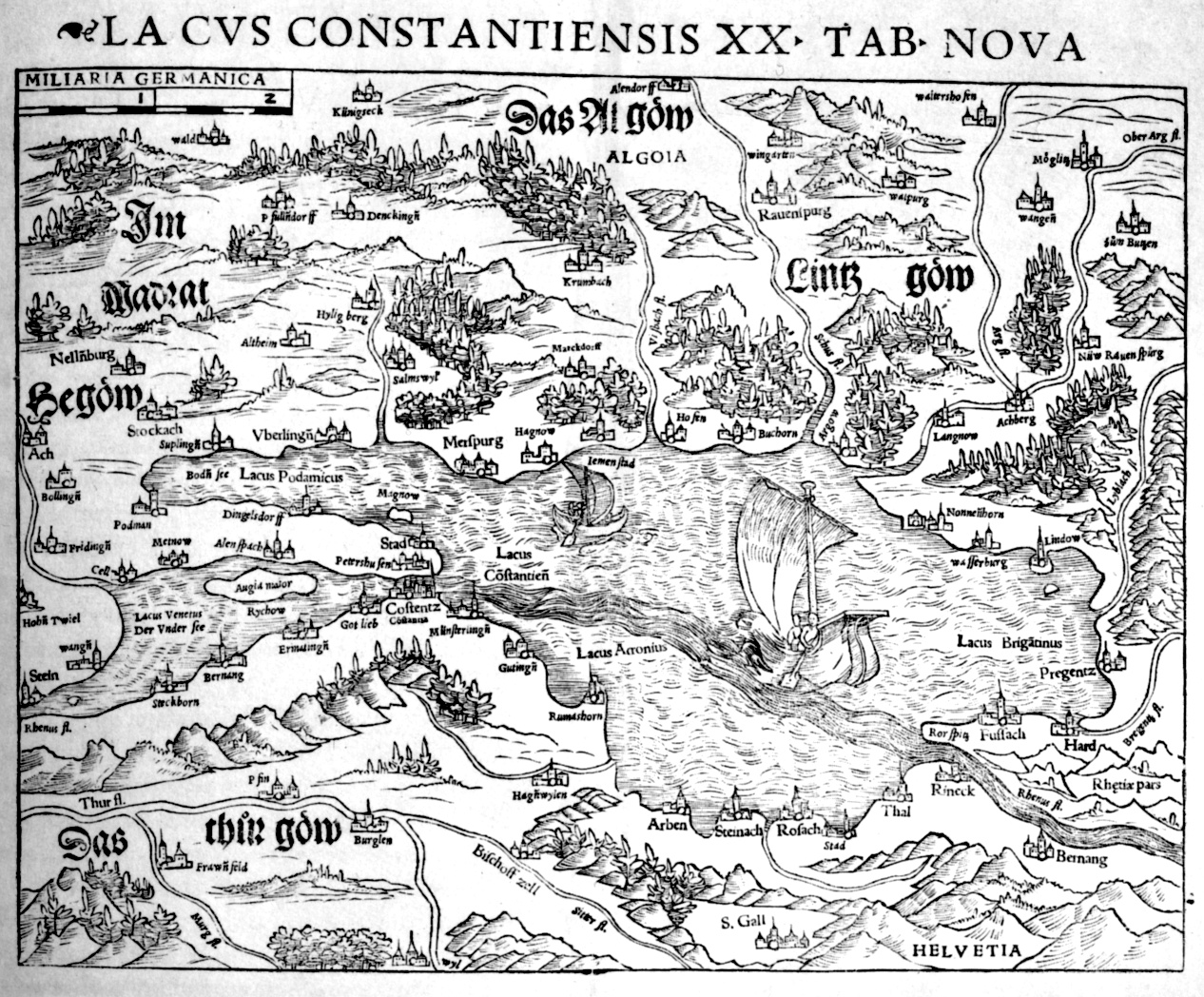
1540 map of the Lake Constance region

- 1540: the map Lacus Constantiensis by Johannes Zwick and Thomas Blarer shows topographic names, towns and the Rhine.
- 1555: the map of the route of the Rhine (Rhinelaufkarte) by Caspar Vopel includes a topographical map of Lake Constance with its larger towns, the tributaries and the course of the Rhine.
- 1633: the Swabian map by Johannes Janssonius, Amsterdam: Totius Sveviae novissima tabula shows Lake Constance with islands, tributaries, towns and villages.
- 1675: The Lake Constance map, Lacos Acronianus sive Bodamicus, by Nikolaus David Hautt based on Andreas Arzet SJ shows Lake Constance with the adjacent lands.

== Geography ==
Aerial view of the lake

=== Divisions ===
Lake Constance is located in the foothills of the Alps. The shore length of both main lakes is 273 kilometres (170 mi) long. Of this, 173 kilometres (107 mi) are located in Germany (Baden-Württemberg 155 kilometres or 96 miles, Bavaria 18 kilometres or 11 miles), 28 kilometres (17 mi) run through Austria and 72 kilometres (45 mi) through Switzerland. If the upper and lower lakes are combined, Lake Constance has a total area of 536 km^{2} (207 sq mi), the third largest lake in Central Europe by area after Lake Balaton (594 km^{2} or 229 sq mi) and Lake Geneva (580 km^{2} or 220 sq mi). It is also the second largest by water volume (48.5 km^{3} or 11.6 cu mi or 39,300,000 acre⋅ft) after Lake Geneva (89 km^{3} or 21 cu mi or 72,000,000 acre⋅ft) and extends for over 69.2 kilometres (43.0 mi) between Bregenz and Stein am Rhein. Its catchment area is around 11,500 km^{2} (4,400 sq mi), and reaching as far south as Lago di Lei in Italy.

The area of the Obersee, or Upper Lake, is 473 km^{2} (183 sq mi). It extends from Bregenz to Bodman-Ludwigshafen for over 63.3 kilometres (39.3 mi) and is 14 kilometres (8.7 mi) wide between Friedrichshafen and Romanshorn. At its deepest point between Fischbach and Uttwil, it is 251.14 metres (824.0 ft) deep.

The three small bays on the Vorarlberg shore have their own names: the Bay of Bregenz, off Hard and Fußach is the Bay of Fussach and west of that is the Wetterwinkel. Farther west, now in Switzerland, is the Bay of Rorschach. To the north, on the Bavarian side, is the Bay of Reutin. The railway embankment from the mainland to the island of Lindau and the motorway bridge over the lake border the so-called Little Lake (Kleiner See), which is located between the Lindau village of Aeschach and the island.

The northwestern, finger-shaped arm of the Obersee is called Überlinger See (or Überlingersee in Swiss Standard German), or Lake Überlingen. It is sometimes regarded as a separate lake, the boundary between Lake Überlingen and the rest of the Upper Lake runs approximately along the line between the southeast tip of Bodanrück (the Hörnle, which belongs to the town of Konstanz) and Meersburg. The Constance Hopper lies between the German and Swiss shores east of Konstanz.

The Obersee and Untersee are connected by the Seerhein.

The Untersee, or Lower Lake, which is separated from the Obersee and from its north-west arm, the Überlinger See, by the large peninsula of Bodanrück, has an area of 63 km^{2} (24 sq mi). It is strongly characterised and divided into different areas by end moraines, various glacial snouts and medial moraines. These various areas of the lake have their own names. North of Reichenau Island is the Gnadensee. West of the island of Reichenau, between the peninsula of Höri and the peninsula of Mettnau is the Zeller See (or Zellersee in Swiss Standard German), or Lake Zell. North of the peninsula and swamp land Mettnau lies the lake part Markelfinger Winkel. The drumlins of the southern Bodanrück continue along the bed of these northern parts of the lake. South of the Reichenau, from Gottlieben to Eschenz, stretches the Rheinsee (lit.: "Rhine Lake") with strong Rhine currents in places. Previously this lake part was named Lake Bernang after the village of Berlingen. On most of the maps the name of the Rheinsee is not shown, because this place is best suited for the name of the Untersee.

Lake Constance on the Swiss National Map (1:50'000)

=== Emergence and future ===
The present-day shape of Lake Constance has resulted from the combination of several factors:

- The tectonic Lake Constance Basin between the Alps and the Jura was created in the Jurassic and Tertiary periods.
- The current Alpine Rhine was initially a tributary of the Danube.
- Over time, the basin was captured by the High Rhine as a result of headward erosion (fluvial erosion).
  - The capture was not always only along the present Rhine valley; Lake Überlingen marks part of an older valley course.
- The river valleys were deepened during several cold periods by the Rhine Glacier from the valley of the Alpine Rhine (glacial erosion).
- Behind the present impressive traces of the Würm Ice Age, the effects of older cold periods can no longer be explored in any detail. Lake Constance now represents, above all, a zungenbecken or glacial lake of the Würm Glaciation.
- During a later phase of the ice age, only the Obersee was glaciated. As the glacier retreated further, the glacial meltwaters flowed out of the emerging Überlingen See through the older more northerly valley into the present High Rhine valley.
- Due to the advancing headward erosion, the present course of the High Rhine was finally (again) reconnected to Lake Constance.

Like any glacial lake, Lake Constance will also silt up by sedimentation. This process can best be observed at the mouths of the larger rivers, especially that of the Alpine Rhine. The silting up process is accelerated by ever-increasing erosion by the Rhine and the associated reduction in the level of the lake.

=== Tributaries ===
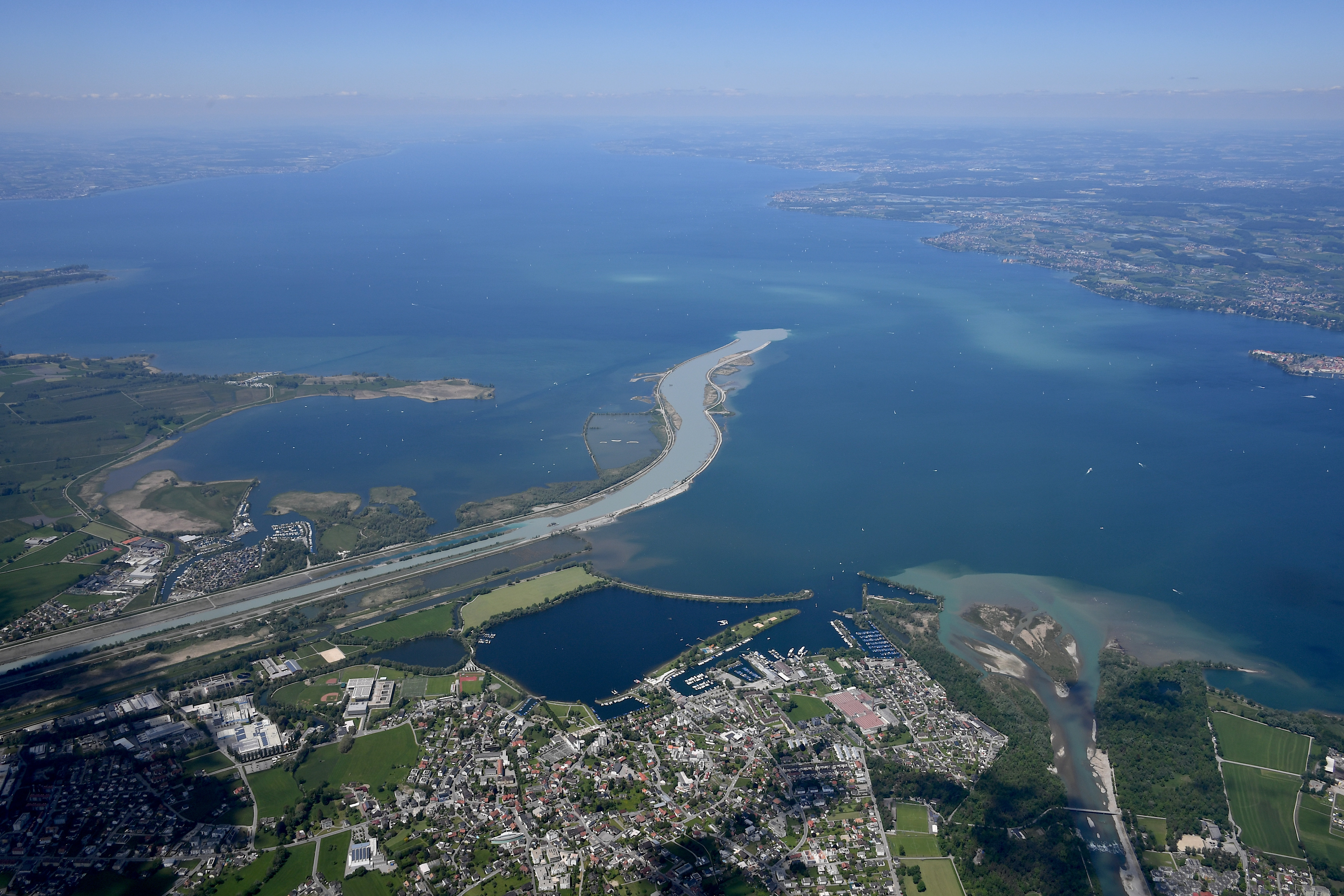
The mouth of the Alpine Rhine into Lake Constance

The main tributary of Lake Constance is the Alpine Rhine. The Alpine Rhine and the Seerhein do not mix greatly with the waters of the lake and flow through the lakes along courses that change relatively little. There are also numerous smaller tributaries (236 in all). The most important tributaries of the Obersee are (counterclockwise) the Dornbirner Ach, Bregenzer Ach, Leiblach, Argen, Schussen, Rotach, Brunnisach, Seefelder Aach, Stockacher Aach, Salmsacher Aach, the Aach near Arbon, Steinach, Goldach and the Old Rhine. The outflow of the Obersee is the Seerhein, which in turn is the main tributary of the Untersee. The most important tributary of the Untersee is the Radolfzeller Aach. The source of the Radolfzeller Aach is the Aachtopf, a karst spring whose waters mostly derive from the Danube Sinkhole. Therefore, the Danube is indirectly also a tributary of the Rhine.

The ten biggest tributaries of the Obersee by discharge volume with its catchment areas:
River	Average discharge [m^{3}/s] (1978–1990)	Discharge in %	Catchment [km^{2}]	Catchment in %
Alpine Rhine	233	61.1	6,119	56.1
Bregenzer Ach	48	12.6	832	7.6
Argen	19	5.3	656	6.0
Old Rhine (Rhine Valley Canal)	12	3.1	360	3.3
Schussen	11	2.9	822	7.5
Dornbirner Ach	7.0	1.8	196	1.8
Leiblach	3.3	0.9	105	1.0
Seefelder Aach	3.2	0.8	280	2.6
Rotach	2.0	0.5	130	1.2
Stockacher Aach	1.6	0.4	221	2.0
Sum of the 10 main tributaries	340	89.6	9,721	89.2
Total inflow	381	100.0	10,903	100.0

Because the Alpine Rhine brings with it drift from the mountains and deposits this material as sediment, the Bay of Bregenz will silt up in a few centuries time. The silting up of the entire Lake Constance is estimated to take another ten to twenty thousand years.

=== Outflows, evaporation, water extraction ===
The outflow of the Untersee is the High Rhine with the Rhine Falls at Schaffhausen. Both the average precipitation of 0.45 km^{3}/a and evaporation which averages 0.29 km^{3}/a cause a net change in the level of Lake Constance that is less when compared to the influence of the inflows and outflows. Further quantities of lake water are extracted by municipal waterworks around the lake and the water company of Bodensee-Wasserversorgung.

=== Islands ===
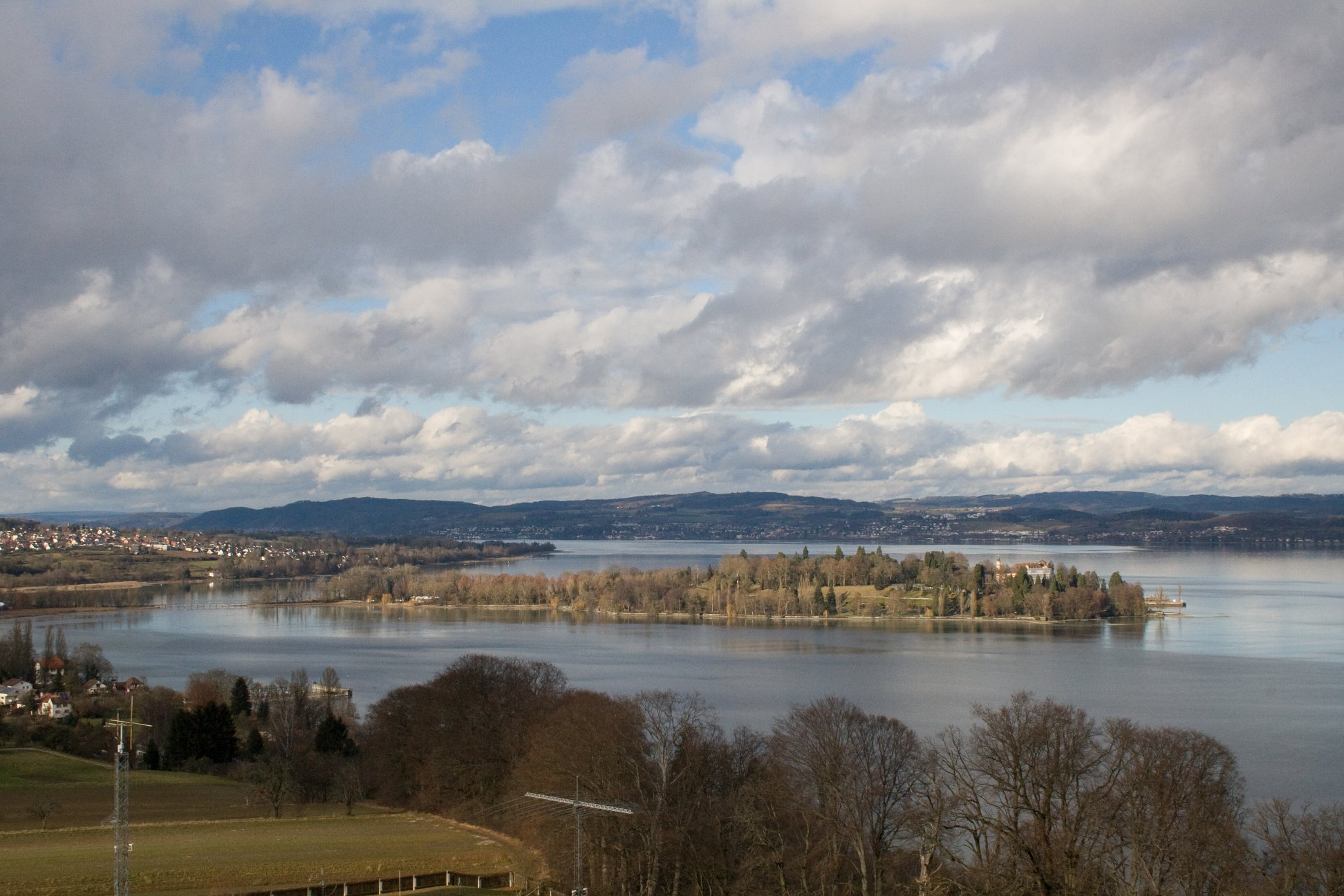
The island of Mainau

In Lake Constance there are ten islands that are larger than 2,000 m^{2} (22,000 sq ft).

By far the largest is the island of Reichenau in the Untersee, which belongs to the municipality of Reichenau. The former abbey of Reichenau is a UNESCO World Heritage Site due to its three early and highly medieval churches. The island is also known for its intensive cultivation of fruit and vegetables.

The island of Lindau is located in the east of the Obersee, and is the second largest island. On it is the old town and main railway station of Lindau.

The third largest island is Mainau in the southeast of Lake Überlingen. The owners, the family of Bernadotte, have set up the island as a tourist attraction and created botanical gardens and wildlife enclosures.

Relatively large, but uninhabited and inaccessible because of their status as nature reserves, are two islands off the Wollmatinger Ried: the Triboldingerbohl which has an area of 13 ha (32 acres) and Mittler or Langbohl which is just three hectares (7.4 acres) in area.

Smaller islands in the Obersee are:

- Dominican Island (Dominikanerinsel) separated by a six-metre-wide ditch from the old town of Constance which is home to the Steigenberger Hotel (two hectares [4.9 acres])
- The tiny island of Hoy near Lindau
- The ten artificial islands on the Rhine Causeway on the Fußach side
- The little island by the port of Romanshorn
- The Wollschweininsel (officially Wulesaueninsle) by the Seepark in Kreuzlingen

In the Untersee are:

- the islands of Werd, Mittleres Werdli and Unteres Werdli which together form the Werd Islands group are located at the outflow of the Rhine from the Untersee at Stein am Rhein into the High Rhine.
- The so-called Liebesinsel ("Love Island", 2,620 m^{2} [28,200 sq ft], southwest of the Mettnau peninsula.

=== Peninsulas ===
In Lake Constance there are several peninsulas which vary greatly in size:

- The Bodanrück, the largest peninsula, separates the Überlinger See (Obersee) from the Untersee. It covers an area of 112 km^{2} (43 sq mi).
- The Mettnau in the Untersee, which extends towards the Island of Reichenau, separates Zeller See in the south from the Markelfinger Winkel in the north. It has a surface area of 1.7 km^{2} (0.66 sq mi).
- The Höri, (about 45-square-kilometres) also extends towards the Island of Reichenau, and separates the Zeller See to the north from the Rheinsee to the south.
- In the southeast, near the mouth of the new Rhine Canal, the Rohrspitz juts out about 1.2 km (0.75 mi) into the lake and forms the western perimeter of the Bay of Fußach. It has an area of about 50 hectares.
- The Wasserburg peninsula has a castle, Schloss Wasserburg, and the parish church of St. George. The peninsula is on the northeastern shore of the Obersee between the Bay of Nonnenhorn in the west and Bay of Wasserburg in the east. It has an area of 2.3 ha (5.7 acres) and was an island until 1720, when the Fuggers built a causeway. In March 2009, 27 people lived on the peninsula.
- The Galgeninsel ("Gallows Island") in the Bay of Reutin is also a peninsula that was formerly an island. It is only 0.16 hectares in area.

=== Shore ===
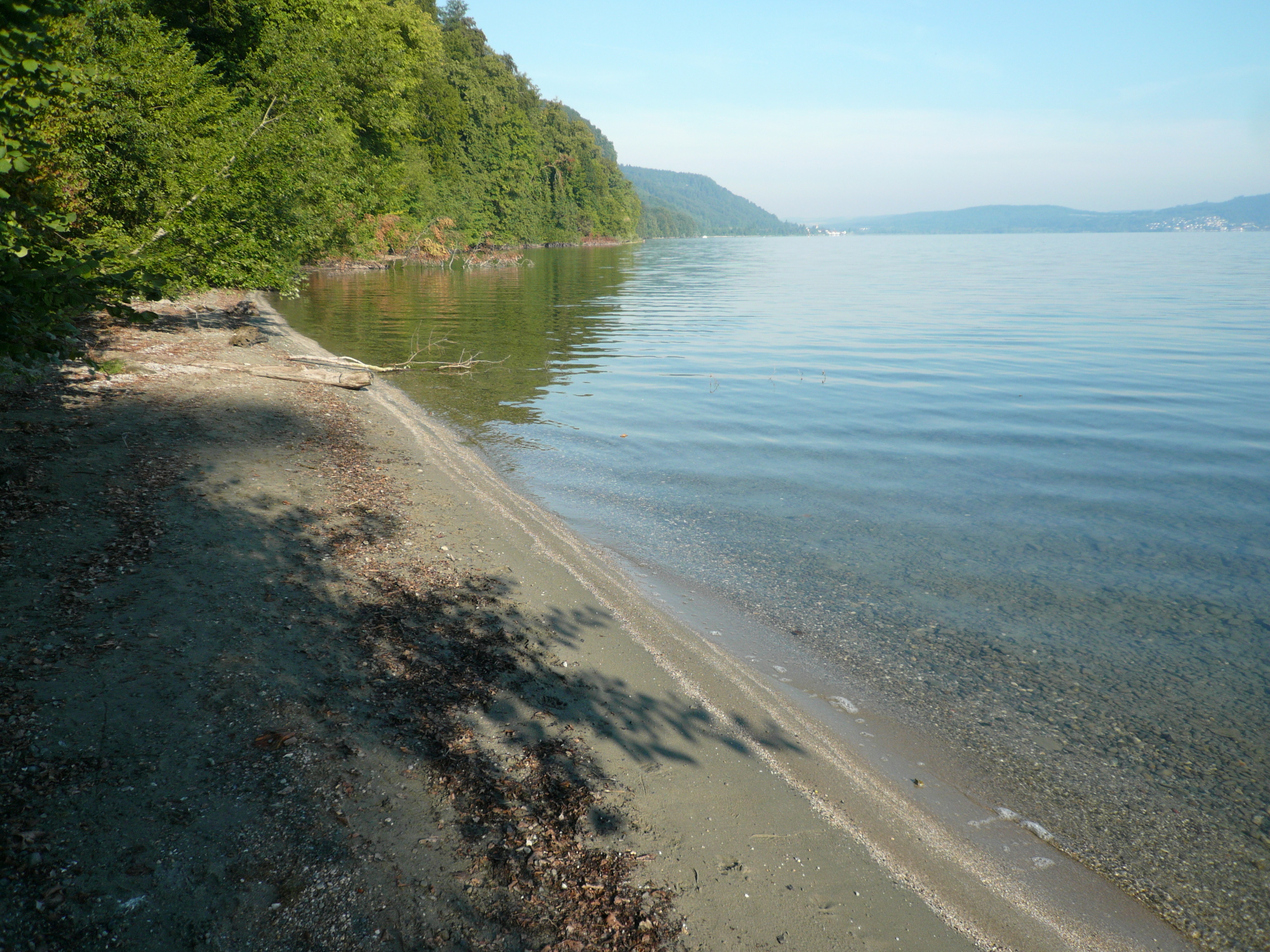
Sandy shore at the Marienschlucht

The shores of Lake Constance consist mainly of gravel. In some places there are also sandy beaches, such as the Rohrspitz in the Austrian section of the lake, the Langenargen and Marienschlucht.

According to the data of the International Water Protection Commission for the Lake Constance, the approximate shore length is 273 km (170 mi) (see Coastline paradox). The inflow of water is constantly changing, mainly due to rain and the snow melt in the Alps. Its average surface area is about 395 m above NN (in Switzerland the absolute value is slightly higher in m above sea level). The more or less regular seasonal fluctuations in the water level also lead to slight variations in shore length and differences in the shore zone habitats (depending on high and low water).

=== Transportation ===
==== Road ====
Roads westbound Bundesstraße 33 (B 33, highway), Bundesautobahn 81 (A 81), at Stockach, Konstanz: Bundesautobahn 98 (A 98), Switzerland: Autobahn 7 (A7), Autobahn 1 (A 1), Autobahn 23 (A 23) and eastbound at Bregenz Rheintal/Walgau Autobahn (A 14), at Lindau Bundesautobahn 96 (A 96), Bundesstraße 31 (B 31)

==== Ship / ferry ====
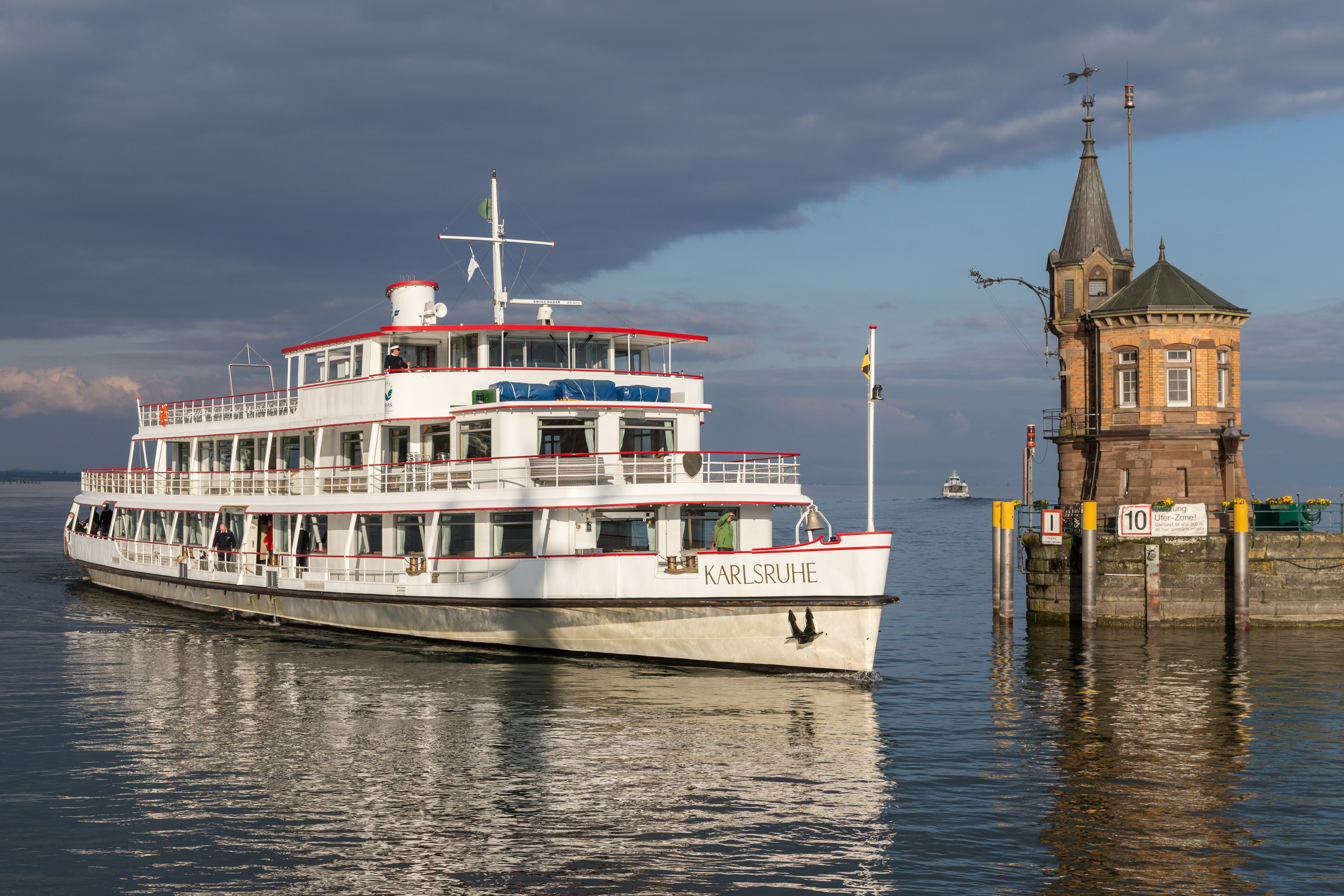
MS Karlsruhe arriving Constance

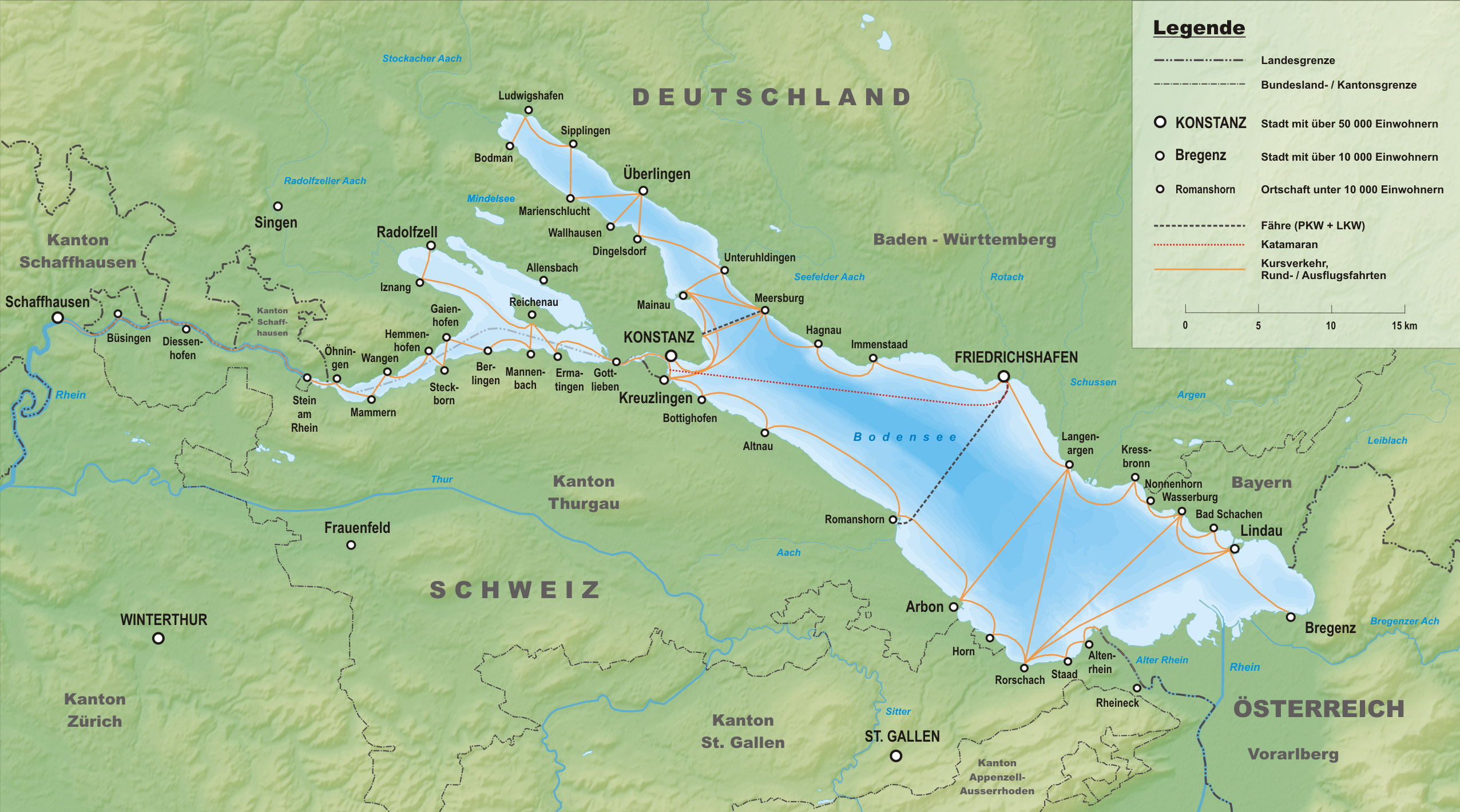
Ship routes on Lake Constance and the High Rhine

There are eight main harbors offering boat services across the Upper Lake:

Austria:

- Bregenz

Switzerland:

- Rorschach
- Romanshorn

Germany:

- Lindau
- Friedrichshafen
- Meersburg
- Unteruhldingen (touristic harbor)
- Konstanz

Additionally, car ferries link Romanshorn to Friedrichshafen, and Konstanz to Meersburg. Between 1869 and 1976, there used to be train ferries across the lake.

Several smaller harbors on the Upper Lake offer boat trips along the German or Swiss coast (with one continuing over the Old Rhine to Rheineck).

The harbour in Konstanz is also served by the Schweizerische Schifffahrtsgesellschaft Untersee und Rhein (URh), which operates via the Seerhein, Lower Lake and High Rhine to Schaffhausen. It docks at the harbours of Kreuzlingen, Konstanz, Gottlieben, Ermatingen, Reichenau, Mannenbach, Berlingen, Gaienhofen, Steckborn, Hemmenhofen, Wangen, Mammern, Öhningen, Stein am Rhein, Diessenhofen, Büsingen and Schaffhausen. Radolfzell and Iznang are also linked by a boat line over the Lower Lake (to Konstanz).

==== Rail ====
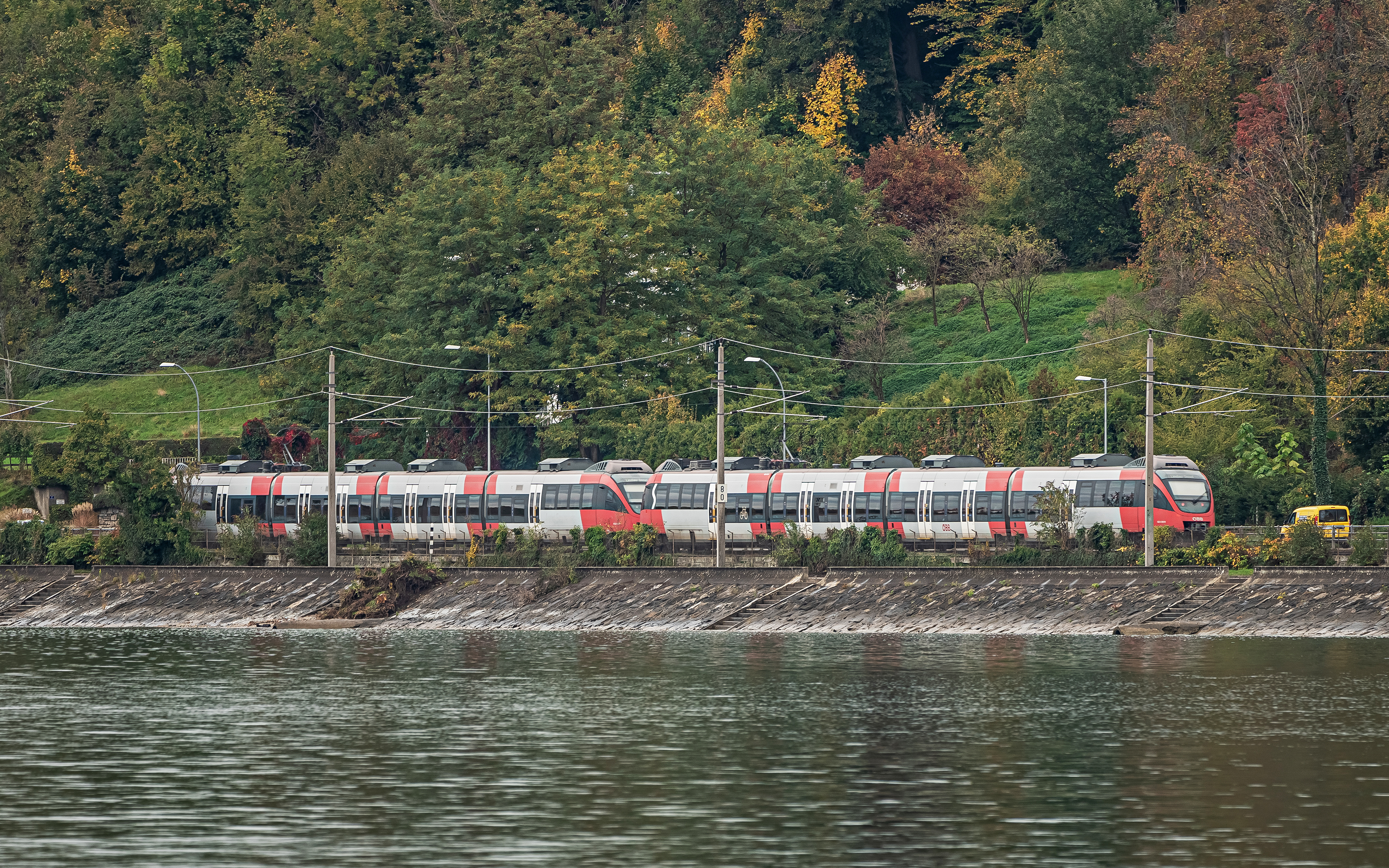
Vorarlberg S-Bahn (S1) trainset on the Vorarlberg Railway line

A network of several railway lines surrounds the lake. The lines are operated by regional train services (S-Bahn, RegioExpress, Regional-Express) spreading over four countries (Austria, Germany, Liechtenstein, Switzerland). In Switzerland, they belong to S-Bahn St. Gallen and trains are operated by THURBO (Swiss Federal Railways, SBB), Südostbahn (SOB) and Appenzell Railways (AB). The so-called belt railway (Bodensee-Gürtelbahn) along the northern shore is operated by DB Regio and SBB GmbH. In Austria and Liechtenstein, train services are operated by Austrian Federal Railways (ÖBB) for the Vorarlberg S-Bahn. Regional train services around Lake Constance are marketed as Bodensee S-Bahn.

Railway stations close to harbours are, among others: Bregenz Hafen, Friedrichshafen Hafen, Konstanz, Kreuzlingen Hafen, Lindau-Insel, Radolfzell, Romanshorn and Rorschach Hafen.

Long-distance trains (RJ/RJX, EC/ECE, IC (DB)/IC (SBB), IR, IRE) link larger lakeside railway stations (e.g., Bregenz, Friedrichshafen Stadt, Konstanz, Lindau-Reutin, Romanshorn) with major cities.

==== Air ====
Two airports are located near the lake's shores: Friedrichshafen Airport (Germany) and St. Gallen–Altenrhein Airport (Switzerland). Zeppelin NT offers touristic zeppelin flights around Lake Constance departing from Friedrichshafen Airport.

=== Climate ===
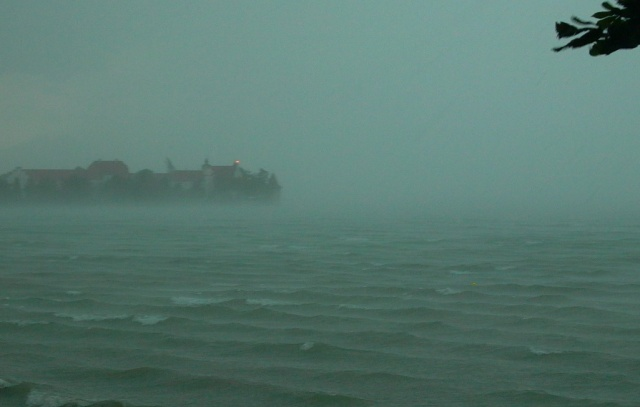
Summer storm – view of the Luitpold Barracks in Lindau

The climate of the Lake Constance area is characterised by mild temperatures with moderate gradients, thanks to the balancing and retarding effect of the large body of water.

It has a subtropical microclimate, which allows the cultivation of some exotic fruits and trees. Constance counts 2069 sunshine hours a year and is therefore considered one of the sunniest cities in Germany.

Winters are generally short and mild, although night temperatures can fall under 0°C, especially from December to February. Typically day temperatures range between +5 and +12°C, while nights with +1 to +8°C on average stay cold, though mostly without long and severe frosts.

The Föhn, a warm wind from the Mediterranean Sea, that regularly blows through the Alps, can cause temperatures between 15 and 20°C with sunshine for several days, while on the other hand fog creates a few cold days between 1 and 5°C each year. Generally, Lake Constance is affected more by fog than neighboring regions more inland.

Spring goes from March to May and is usually sunny, with day temperatures between 15 and 22°C but still relatively cold water. This is also resulting in still cold night temperatures that range between 4°C in March and 12°C in May only.

As the lake temperature heats up by the increasing warm days, the nights are also becoming milder, though moderated a little bit by the height and lake. This results in average morning lows of 16-18°C during the high summer months. Lake Constance counts one of the highest amount of tropical nights in Germany (lowest temperature at 20°C or more).

The days in Summers (June-September) are warm to hot with day temperatures of 26-33°C on average, decreasing to around 20°C until the end of September. Humidity levels raise noticeable and temperatures often move up to 35°C between June and August. This increases the heat index, causing Lake Constance to have a stressful climate.

The region receives most of its sunny days during high summer. In the recent years, in 2018 and 2022, the water levels fall to new record lows due to weeks without significant rain. On the other hand, the closeness to the Alps can cause thunderstorms in the evenings that sometimes occur out of nowhere.

While the official bathing season ends in September, the average lake temperature stays around 20°C until October. Autumn is generally the time when Lake Constance starts to experience more foggy mornings again, but the day temperatures still range between 21 in the beginning and 10-12°C at the end of the season. Night temperatures fall from 13°C in September to an average of 5°C in November.

Lake Constance is one of the best known wine growing regions in Germany and experiences several outdoor events during harvest time in autumn.

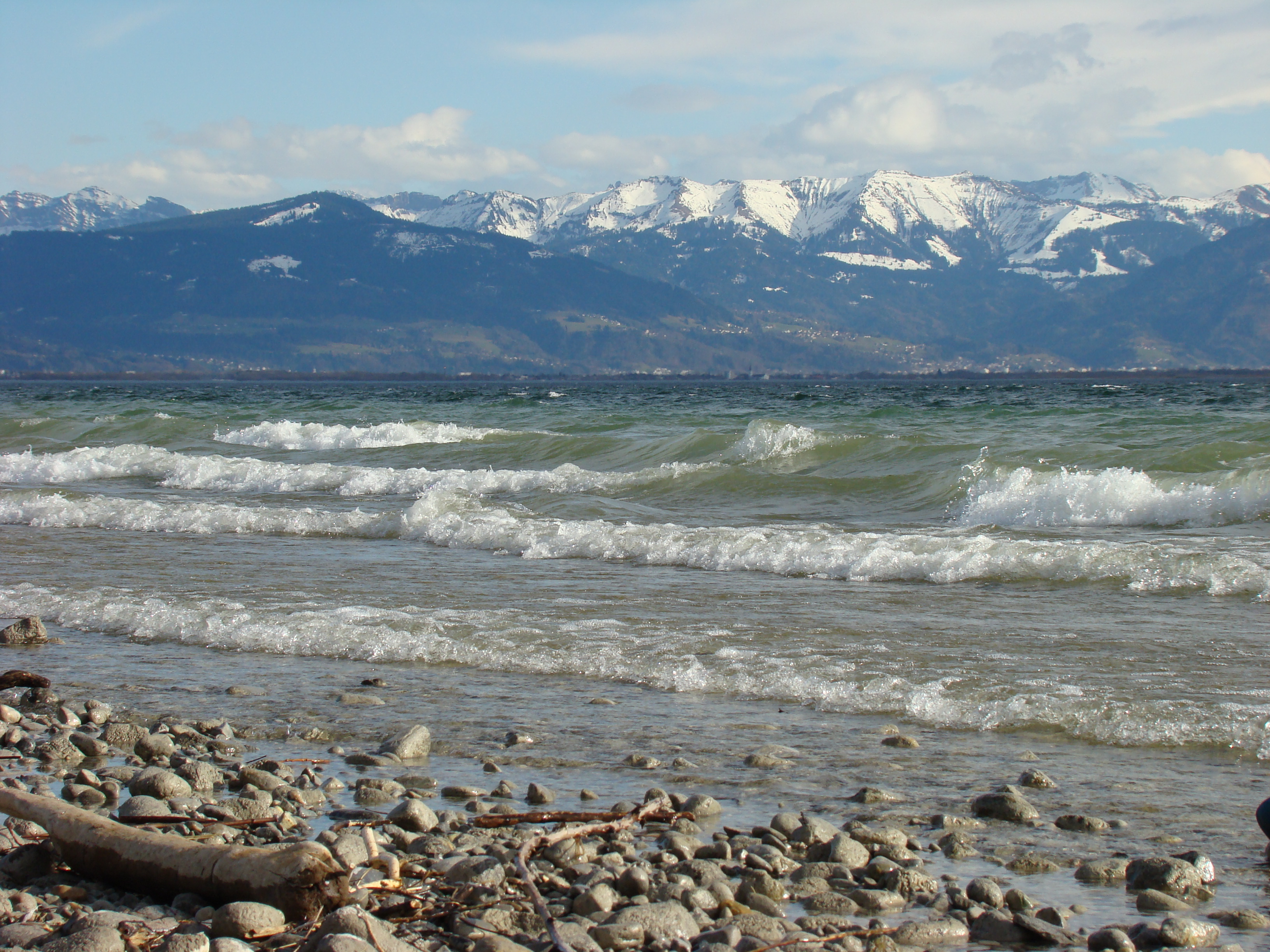
Waves raised by Föhn winds

Lake Constance is also considered to be a risky and challenging lake for water sports because of the danger of gusty winds which can whip up waves as the weather changes suddenly. The most dangerous wind is the föhn, a warm down-slope wind from the Alps, which spreads out across the water, especially through the Alpine Rhine Valley and can generate waves several metres high.

Similarly dangerous for those unfamiliar with the area, are the sudden stormy gusts of wind during summer thunderstorms. They constantly claim victims from the water sports fraternity. During a thunderstorm in July 2006, waves reached heights of up to 3.50 metres.

For these reasons, there is a storm warning system in all three neighbouring countries. For storm warning purposes, Lake Constance is divided into three warning regions (west, centre and east). Warnings can be issued for each region independently. A "high winds" warning will be issued when squalls are expected of between 25 and 33 knots or registering force 6 to 8 on the Beaufort scale. A gale warning announces the likelihood of gale-force winds, i.e. those at speeds as of 34 knots or more or force 8 on the Beaufort scale. In order to issue these warnings, orange-coloured flashing lights are installed around the lake, which flash at a frequency of 40 times per minute for high winds or 90 times per minute for gales. It can happen that, due to the differently regulated responsibilities and assessments, a gale warning is issued on the Swiss side of the Obersee, but not on the German or Austrian shores, and vice versa. Ships and ferries on Lake Constance indicate a gale warning by hoisting a Sturmballon ("storm ball") up the mast.

==== Freeze over ====
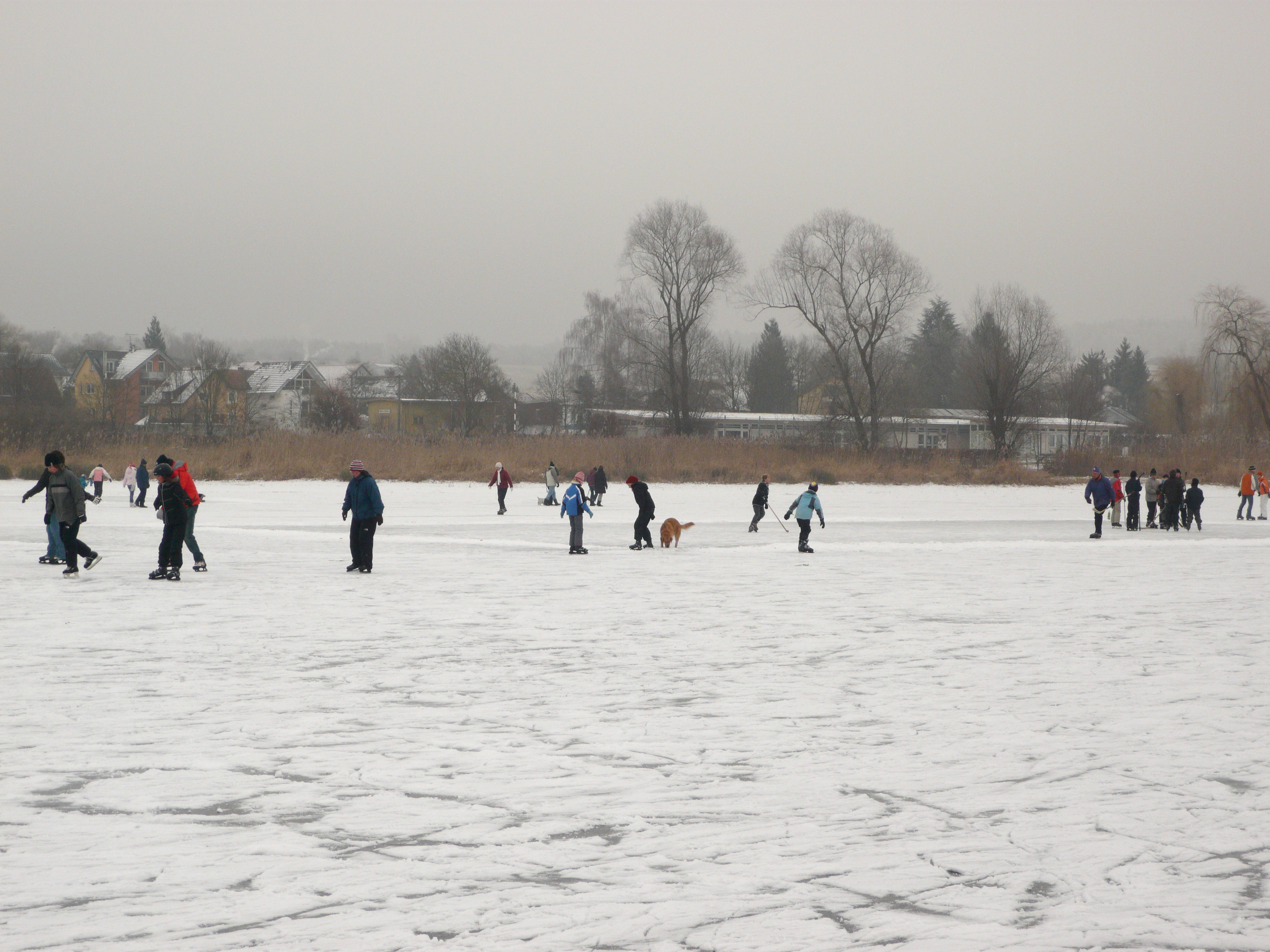
Frozen lake surface: skating in the Markelfinger Winkel

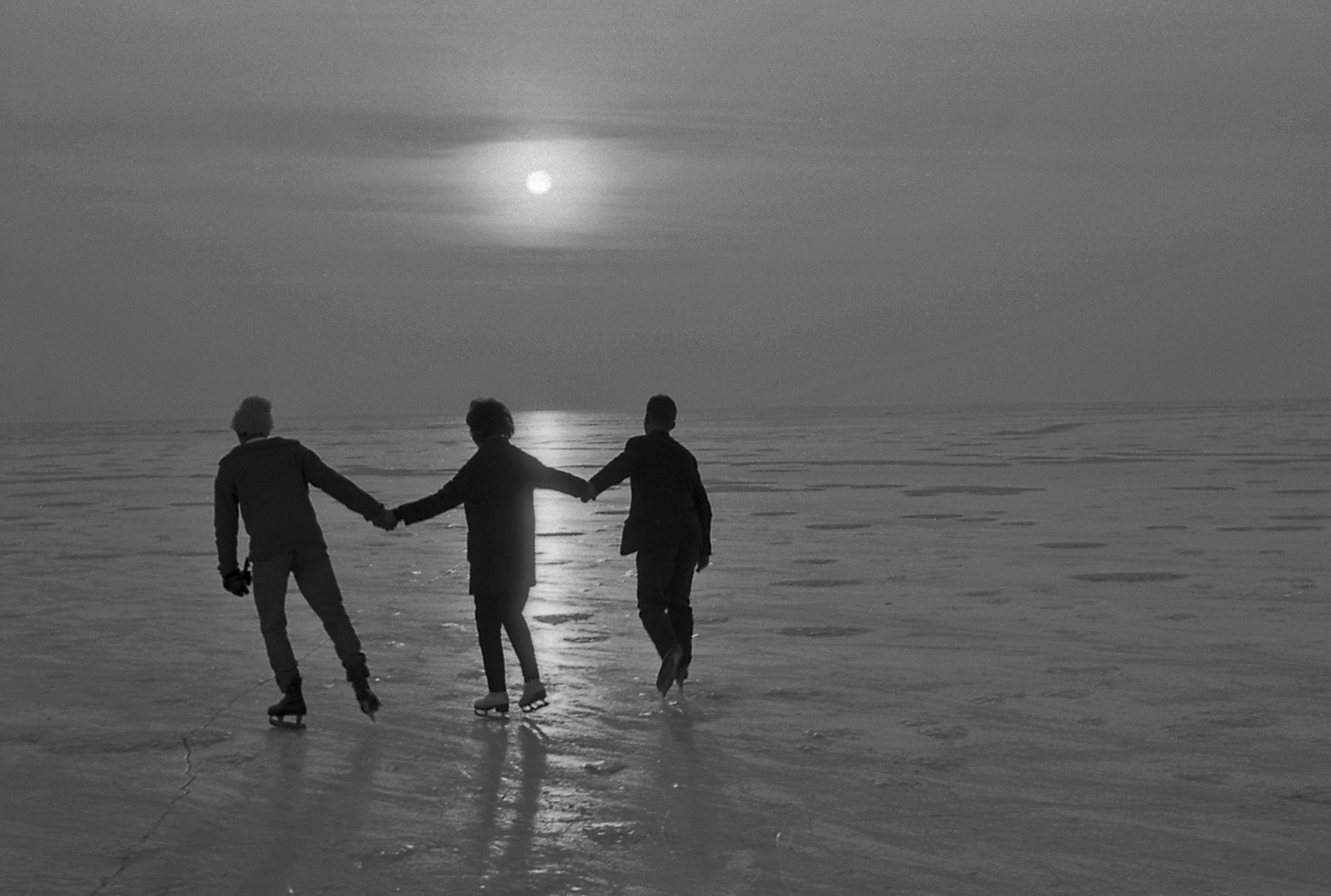
Freezing of Lake Constance in 1963

A one-hundred year event is the freezing over of Lake Constance, when the Lower Lake and the Upper Lake are completely frozen over so that people can safely cross the lake on foot. The last so-called Seegfrörne (Alemannic) event was in 1963. The following is a list of years in which Lake Constance froze over partially or completely:

- 875, 895
- 1074, 1076
- 1108
- 1217, 1227, 1277
- 1323, 1325, 1378, 1379, 1383
- 1409, 1431, 1435 (complete), 1460, 1465, 1470, 1479
- 1512, 1517, 1553, 1560 (complete), 1564, 1565, 1571, 1573 (complete)
- 1684, 1695 (complete)
- 1788, 1796 (complete)
- 1830 (complete), 1880 (complete)
- 1929, 1963 (complete)

Certain parts of the lake freeze over more frequently, mainly due to their shallow depth of water and shelter, as is the case, for example, of the so-called Markelfinger Winkel between the municipality of Markelfingen and the Mettnau peninsula.

==== Floods ====
- A 100-year flood around June 1999 (Pfingsthochwasser 1999) raised the level about 2 metres above normal, flooding harbors and many shoreline buildings and hotels.
- In late August 2005, heavy rain raised the level by more than 70 cm (28 in) in a few days. The rains caused widespread flooding and washed out highways and railroads.
- Frequent rainfall and snowmelt in the summer of 2024 raised water levels to 68 cm (27 in) above normal level.
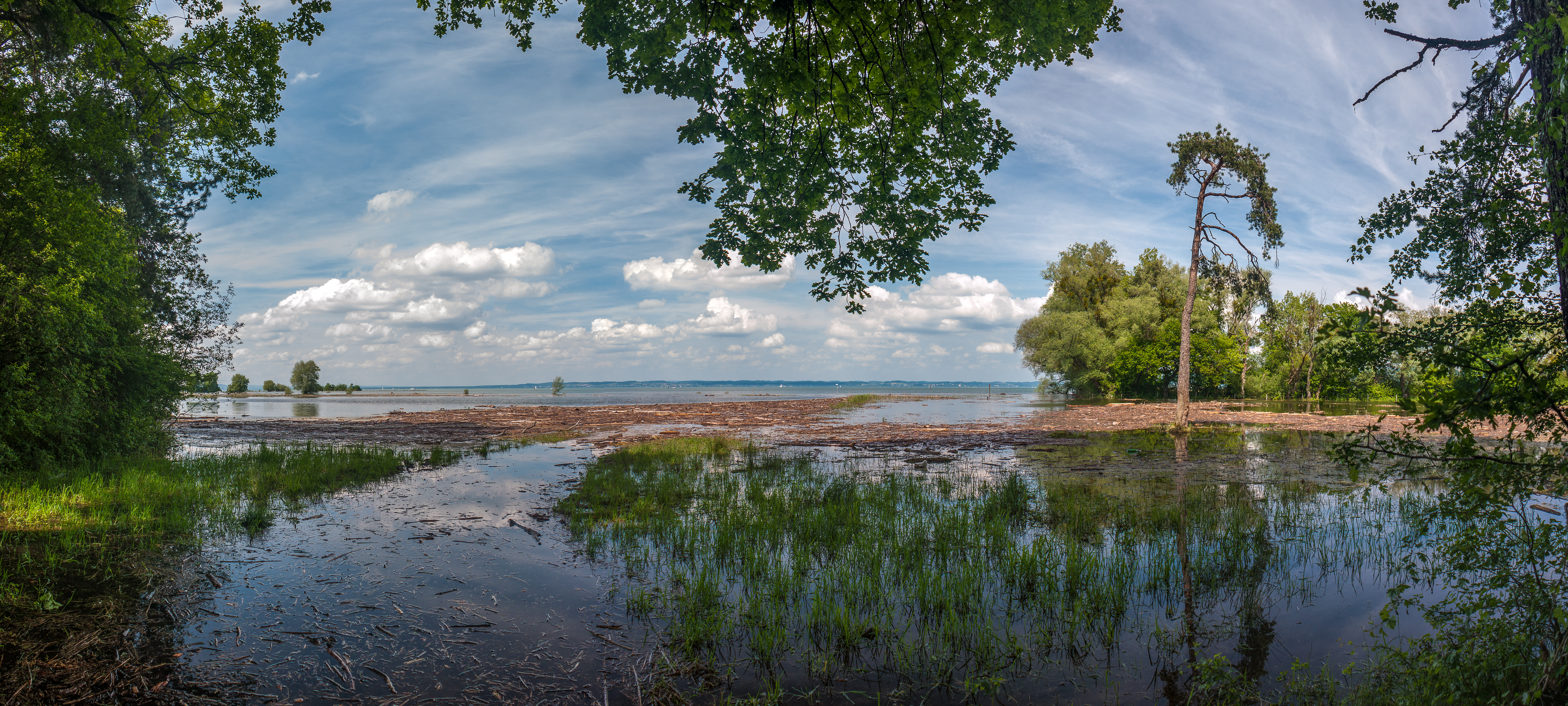
Flooding on the shore of Lake Constance, May 2013

=== International borders ===
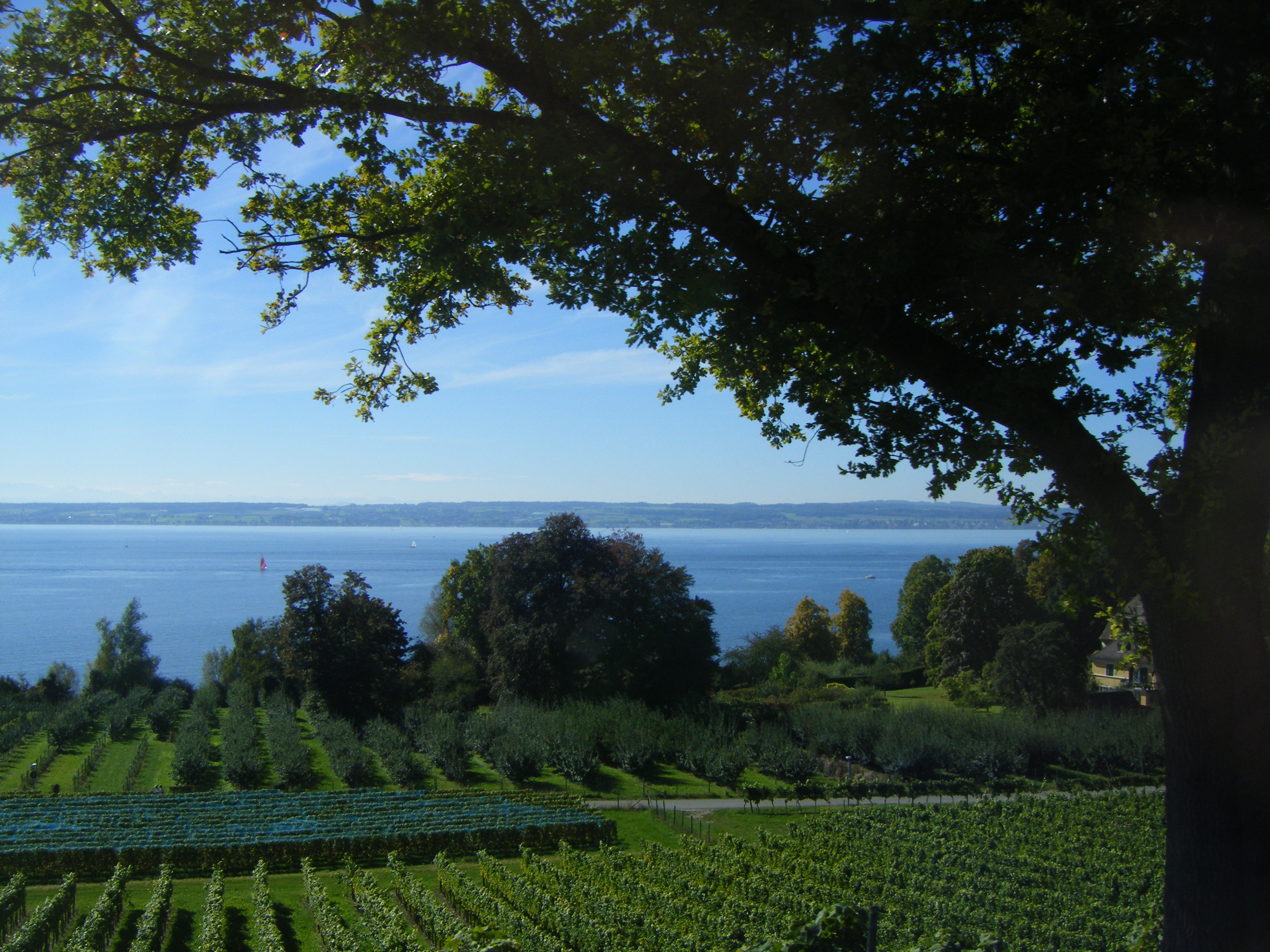
Lake Constance, seen from a vineyard

The lake lies where the countries of Austria, Germany, and Switzerland meet. Beyond areas less than 25 m (82 ft) deep, considered to be under the jurisdiction of the nearest country, there is no legally binding agreement as to where the borders lie between the three countries. However, Switzerland holds the view that the border runs through the middle of the lake, Austria is of the opinion that the contentious area belongs to all the states on its banks, which is known as a "condominium", and Germany holds an ambiguous opinion. Legal questions pertaining to ship transport and fishing are regulated in separate treaties.

Disputes occasionally arise. One concerns a houseboat which was moored in two states (ECJ c. 224/97 Erich Ciola); another concerns the rights to fish in the Bay of Bregenz. In relation to the latter, an Austrian family was of the opinion that it alone had the right to fish in broad portions of the bay. However, this was accepted neither by the Austrian courts nor by the organs and courts of the other states.

== Ecology ==
=== Flora ===
Until the 19th century, Lake Constance was a natural lake. Since then, nature has been heavily influenced by clearing and the cultivation of much of the land around its shores. However, some near-natural areas have been largely conserved, especially in the nature reserves, or were re-naturalised. As a result, the Lake Constance region has some unusual ecological features. These include the large forested area on the Bodanrück, the occurrence of marsh gentian and orchids of the genera Dactylorhiza and Orchis in the Wollmatinger Ried, and the Siberian iris (Iris sibirica) in the Eriskircher Ried, which was therefore given its own name. One unique species among the local flora is the Lake Constance forget-me-not (Myosotis rehsteineri), whose habitat is restricted to undisturbed limestone gravel beaches.

=== Fauna ===
==== Birds ====
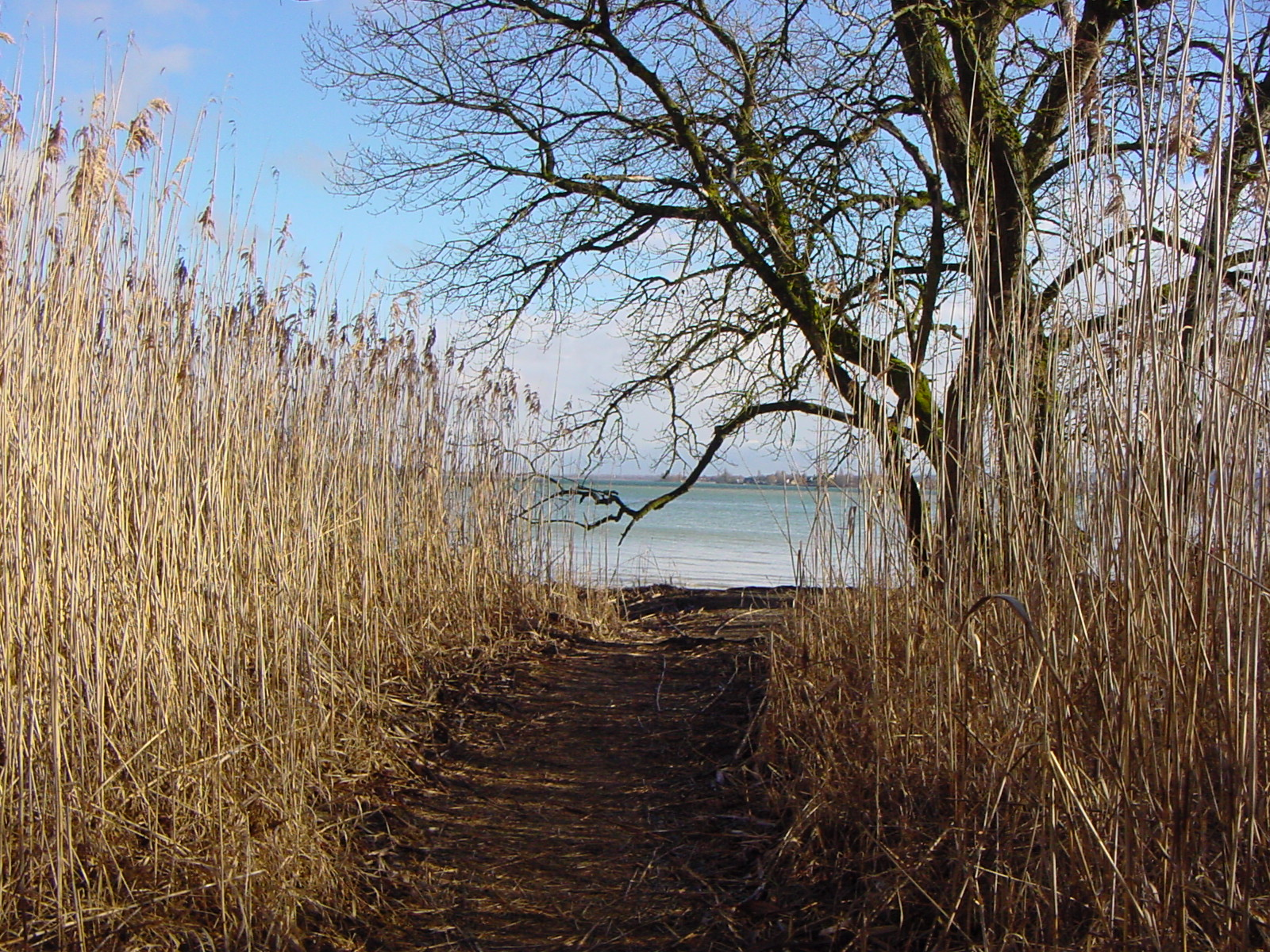
The Mettnau peninsula

Lake Constance is also the home of numerous bird species, many of which nest in its nature reserves, such as the Wollmatinger Ried or the Mettnau peninsula. 412 species have so far been recorded.

===== Songbirds =====
The ten most common breeding bird species at Lake Constance according to a 2000–2003 survey in descending order are the: blackbird, chaffinch, house sparrow, great tit, blackcap, starling, robin, chiffchaff, greenfinch, and blue tit.

===== Waterfowl =====
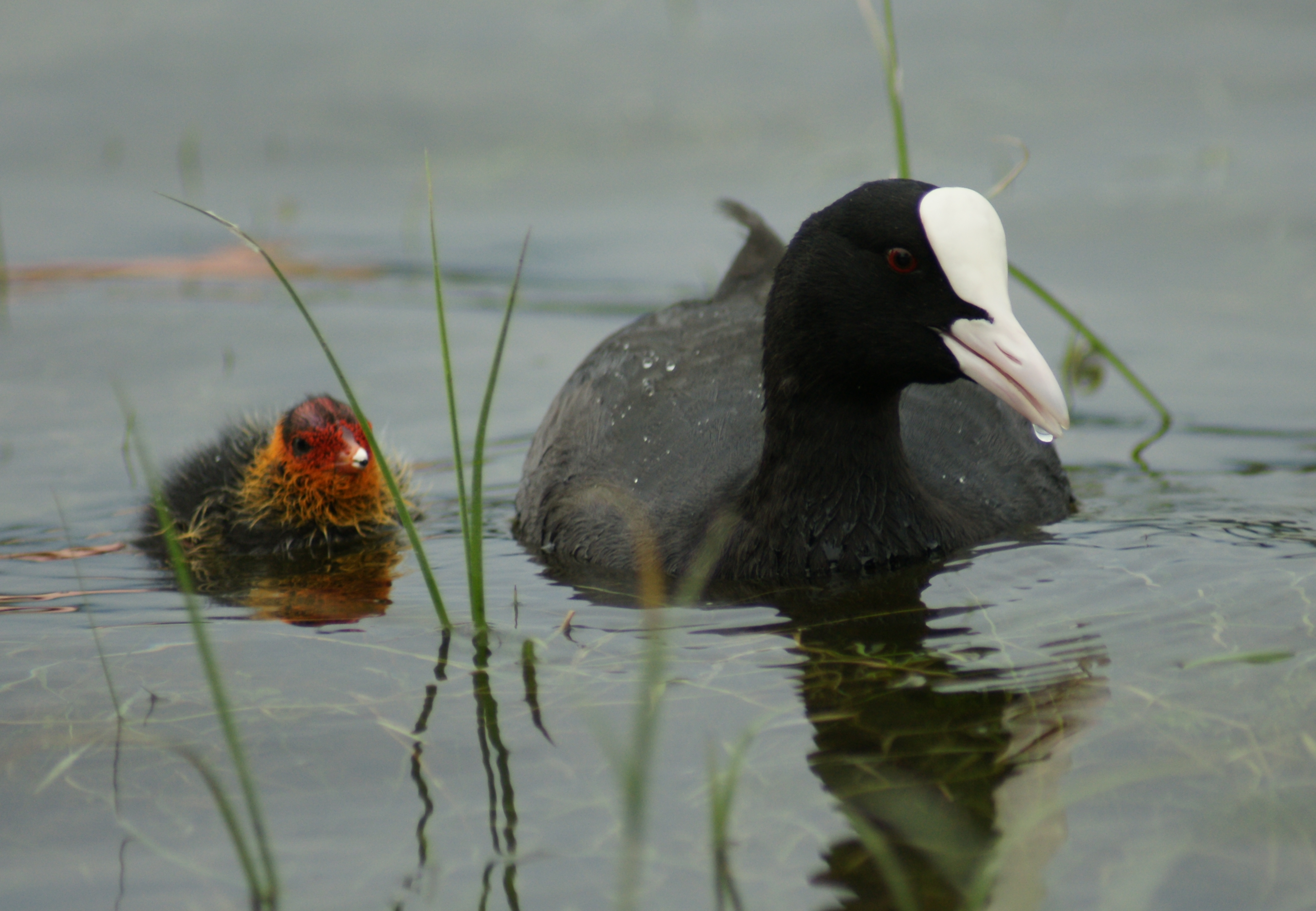
Coot in Hard am Bodensee

In spring, the Lake Constance is an important breeding ground, especially for the coot and great crested grebe. Typical waterfowl include the: shoveler, goldeneye, goosander, pochard, grey heron, pintail, tufted duck and mallard.

In December 2014, 1,389 cormorant were counted. The International Lake Constance Fishery Association (IBF) estimates the food requirements of the cormorants on Lake Constance at 150 tonnes of fish annually.

===== Overwintering =====
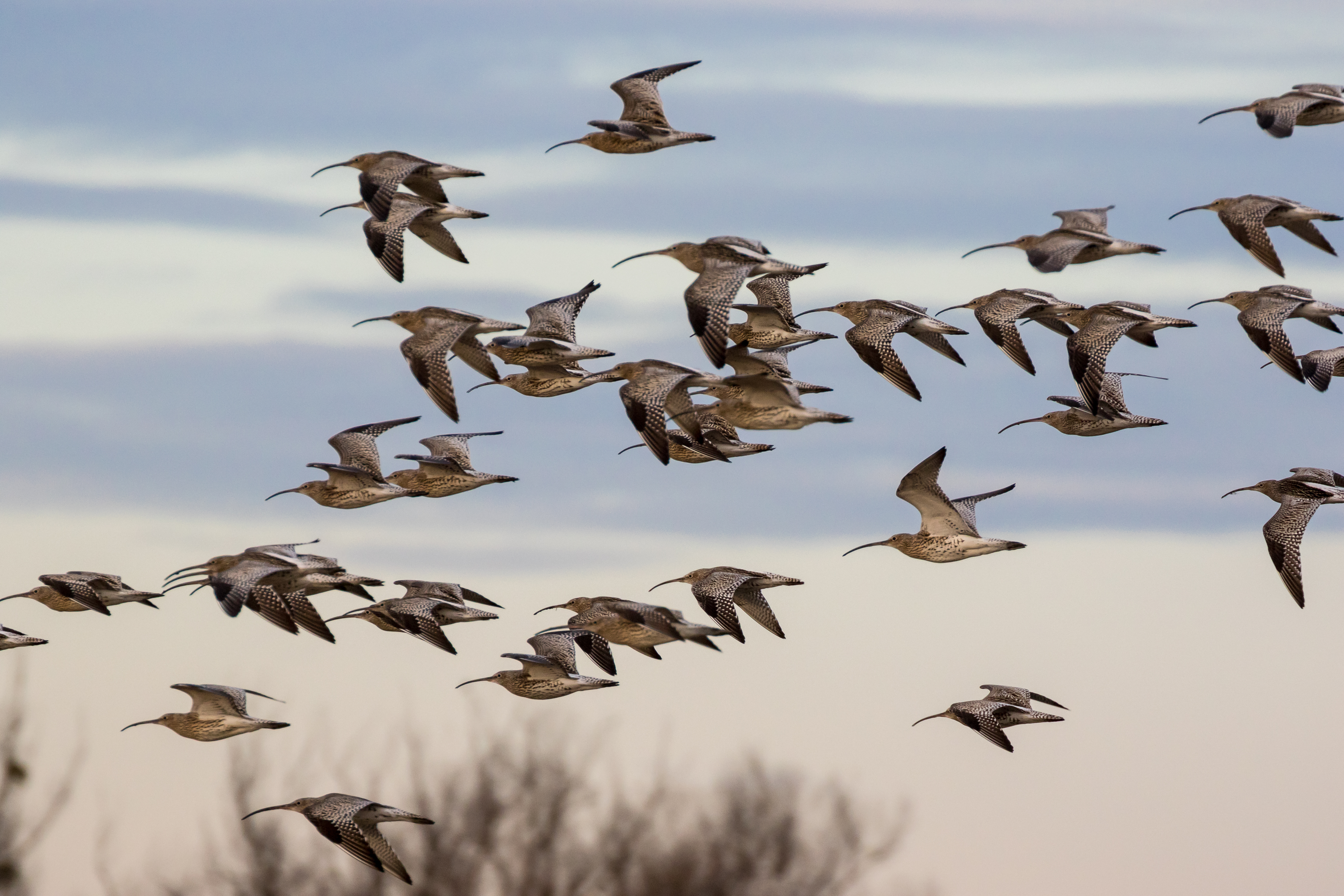
Curlews at Lake Constance

Lake Constance is an important overwintering area for around 250,000 birds. annually. Bird species such as the dunlin, the curlew and the lapwing overwinter at Lake Constance. In the middle of December 2014 there were 56,798 heron, 51,713 coot and 43,938 pochard. In November/December are about 10,000 to 15,000 red-crested pochard and 10,000 great crested grebe on Lake Constance.

===== Migration =====
During migration in late autumn there are also numerous loons on the lake (black-throated and red-throated loon, as well as a few great northern loons). Lake Constance is also very important as a staging post during the bird migration. Bird migration is often inconspicuous and most noticeable when there are special weather conditions that make day migration obvious. Only where there is a prolonged spell of widespread low-pressure is it common to observe the congestion of large groups of migratory birds. This can often be observed in autumn on the Eriskircher Ried on the northern shore of Lake Constance. This is where broad front migration converges on the lake and birds then try to move along the shore towards the northwest. The importance of Lake Constance as an important area for resting and overwintering is underlined by the Max Planck Institute for Ornithology's Radolfzell Bird Observatory (Vogelwarte Radolfzell), which is the bird ringing centre for the German states of Bavaria, Baden-Württemberg, Berlin, Rhineland-Palatinate and the Saarland as well as for Austria, and which researches bird migration.

==== Fish ====
Around 45 species of fish live in Lake Constance. The annual haul from fishing is 1.5 million kg. Unusual species occurring here considering the location of the lake are the whitefish (Coregonus spec.) and the Arctic char (Salvelinus alpinus). Fish that are important for the fishing industry are:

- Bodenseefelchen (German: also Blaufelchen, Lat.: Coregonus wartmanni)
- Sandfelchen (German: also Weißfelchen, Lat.: Coregonus arenicolus)
- Gangfisch (Lat.: Coregonus macrophthalmus)
- Lake Constance whitefish (German: Kilch, Lat.: Coregonus gutturosus)
- Grayling (German: Äsche, Lat.: Thymallus thymallus)
- Perch (German: Flussbarsch, Kretzer, Barschling, Swiss German: Egli, Lat.: Perca fluviatilis)
- Bream (German: Brachse, Brasse, Lat.: Abramis brama)
- Northern pike (German: Hecht (Lat.: Esox lucius)
- Zander (Lat.: Sander lucioperca)
- Burbot (German: Quappe, Trüsche, Lat.: Lota lota)
- Eel (German: Aal, Lat.: Anguilla anguilla)
- Bullhead (German: Groppe, Lat.: Cottus gobio)
- Tench (German: Schleie, Lat.: Tinca tinca)
- Wels catfish (German: Wels, Lat.: Silurus glanis)
- Lake trout (German: Seeforelle, Lat.: Salmo trutta lacustris)

The Bodenseefelchen (Coregonus wartmanni), which was named after Lake Constance due to the great numbers found there, is often prepared whole or as a fillet, in the style of the miller's wife (nach Müllerin Art), in local fish restaurants in a similar way to other trout It is also often served smoked.

Two endemic species are known to have existed only in Lake Constance, the Bodensee-Kilch (Coregonus gutturosus) and deepwater char (Salvelinus profundus). The former is now assumed to be extinct, while the latter was feared extinct for decades until its rediscovery in the 2010s.

==== Introduced species ====
For many years non-native species have settled in the Lake Constance ecosystem and, in some cases, endangered or threatened native flora and fauna. At Lake Constance, non-native species have been increasing annually. Several have been transported from other waterbodies as 'stowaways' on the outside of boats, life jackets, anchor chains or ropes or diving gear. Others have immigrated from the Black Sea or the Danube since the opening of the Main-Danube Canal. Others have been deliberately introduced.

===== Well-known non-native species =====
Even the rainbow trout (Oncorhynchus mykiss) is not a native fish. It was introduced into Lake Constance around 1880 for economic reasons to enhance the local fauna.

Among the foreign species of animal in Lake Constance are the zebra mussel (Dreissena polymorpha) which, since the 18th century, has spread from the Black Sea region across most of Europe and was carried into Lake Constance between 1960 and 1965. After a huge increase in numbers during the 1980s in the Rhine and large lakes, this species is now in retreat today. The zebra mussel causes problems because, among other things, it blocks water extraction pipes. In addition, the species can be a disaster for domestic shellfish, because it competes for their food. Today, according to the Institute for Lake Research (Institut für Seenforschung, ISF), the zebra mussel is also an important food for overwintering waterfowl. In fact, the number of overwinterers has more than doubled in around 30 years.

The killer shrimp (Dikerogammarus villosus) has spread since 2002 from two sections of shoreline near Hagnau and Immenstaad, over the whole Lake Überlingen (2004), the whole of the Upper Lake (2006) and almost the whole Lake Constance and Rheinsee shore (2007). As its name implies, it is a voracious burglar of fish larvae and fish eggs.

The most recent example is the little opossum shrimp (Limnomysis benedeni), only six to eleven millimeters long, which was found in 2006 in the Vorarlberg region of Hard, and can now be found almost all over Lake Constance. It comes from the waters around the Black Sea. It was presumably first transported by ships up the Danube before it spread into the Rhine river system and entered Lake Constance. The opossum shrimp, which occurs in many places in shoals of several million in winter, are already an influential link in the food chain in Lake Constance. They consume dead animal and plant material as well as phytoplankton, but are also eaten by fish themselves.

Today, in western Lake Constance are found: the North American spinycheek crayfish (Orconectes limosus), which was introduced into European waters in the mid-19th century to increase the yield, occasionally the Chinese mitten crab (Eriocheir sinensis), and in the lake's tributaries, the signal crayfish (Pacifastacus leniusulus). As these species of large crayfish are immune to crayfish plague, but spread the pathogen, they are a great danger to native species such as noble crayfish, white-clawed crayfish or stone crayfish. The animals are often undemanding, multiply rapidly and lead predatory lives, thus also posing a threat to various small species of fish. The ISF has been systematically researching the subject since 2003.

=== Wrecks on the lake bed ===
After a collision with the Stadt Zürich in 1864 the wreck of the Jura has lain on the lake bed at a depth of 45 metres off the Swiss shore. In the early 20th century four ships were sunk in the Obersee after being taken out of service: in 1931 the Baden, formerly the Kaiser Wilhelm, in 1932 the Helvetia, in 1933 the Säntis and in 1934 the Stadt Radolfzell. The hull of the burnt-out Friedrichshafen was scuttled in 1944 off the mouth of the Argen in 100 to 150 metres of water.

== Tourism, leisure and sports ==
The tourism and leisure industry is important for this region. Overnight stays reached 17,56m visitors in 2012 with a turnover of about 1.9bn Euros. The same amount comes from the 70 million visitors who visit Lake Constance each year.

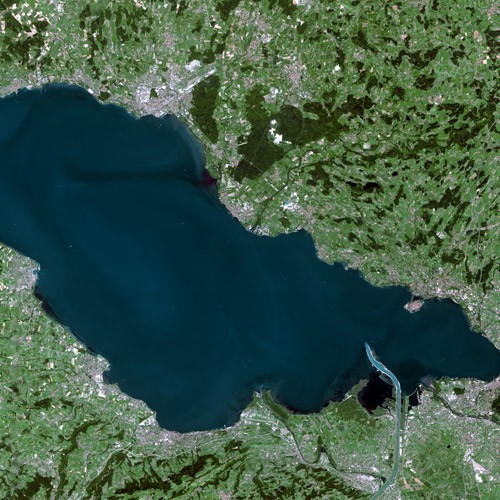
Eastern part of Upper Lake Constance seen from Spot satellite

This region is known for sightseeing, water-sports, winter-sports like skiing, summer-sports like swimming, sailing and recreation. It is also one of the few places where modern zeppelin airships operate and 12–14 people can take a trip above the lake around various points of interest.

In cooperation with tourism service providers, tourism organizations and public institutions in Germany, Austria, Switzerland and Liechtenstein, the International Bodensee Tourismus GmbH (IBT GmbH) is responsible for the tourism marketing of the Lake Constance region.

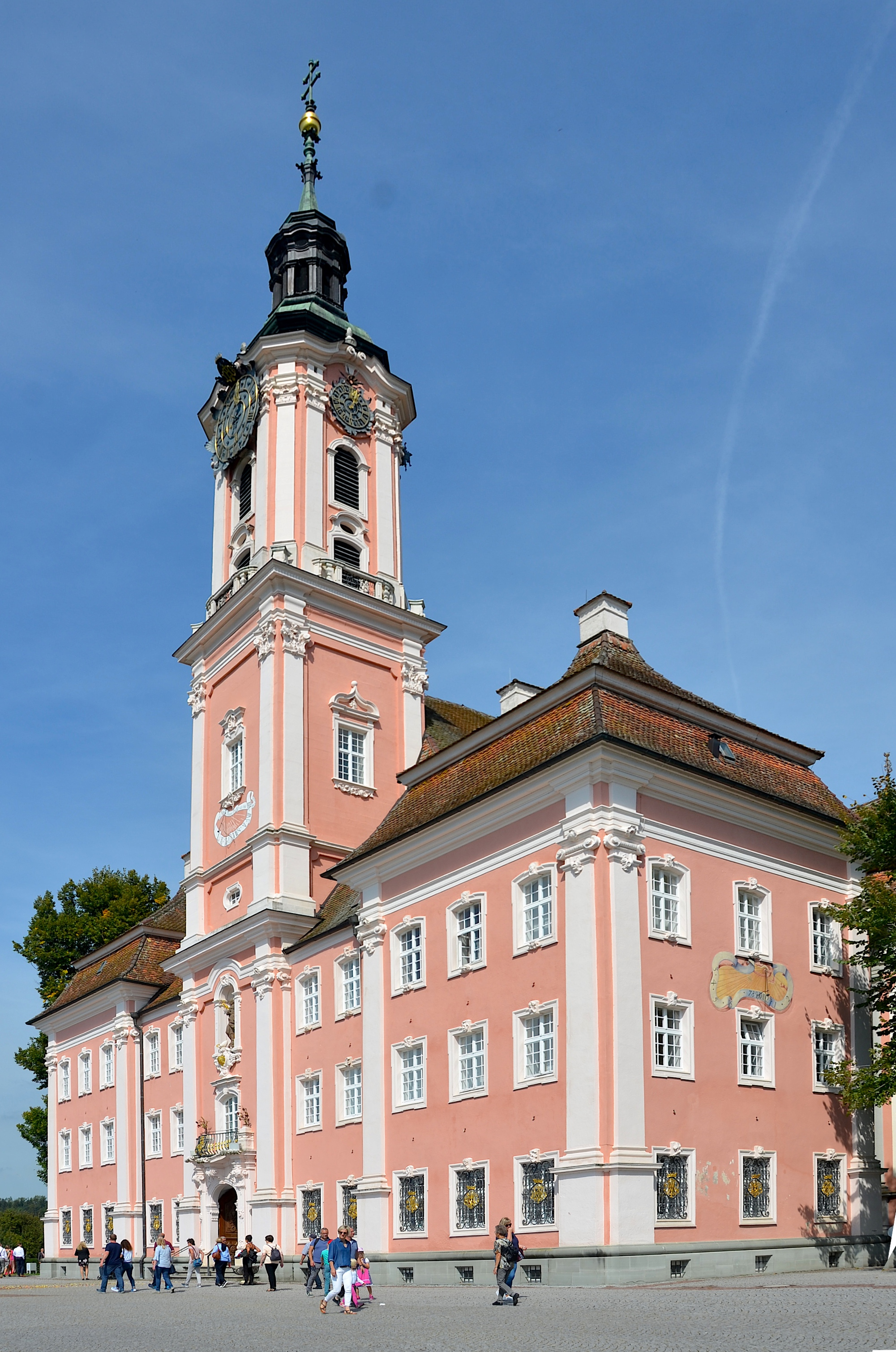
Pilgrimage church of Birnau

=== Sights and cultural heritage ===
The lake and the region around it have a substantial touristic infrastructure as well as many attractions and points of interests. Important are especially towns like Konstanz, Überlingen, Meersburg, Friedrichshafen, Lindau, Romanshorn, Rorschach and Bregenz as they are the big hubs for boating tourism and lake crossing ferries. The main tourism attractions are places like Rhine Falls, one of the three biggest waterfalls in Europe (located near Schaffhausen), the islands of Mainau, Lindau and Reichenau (UNESCO world heritage), the pilgrimage church Birnau, castles and palaces like Salem Abbey, Meersburg Castle as well as another UNESCO world heritage site, the Pfahlbaumuseum Unteruhldingen (German for Stilt house museum), Zeppelin Museum Friedrichshafen as well as the Church of St. George, Oberzell, Reichenau or the Rheinschauen heritage railway.

==== Overlooks ====
High mountain ranges are mainly located near the southeastern shore of the Upper Lake (Obersee). The lower foothills of the Appenzell Alps in Switzerland are accessible by bus routes and two railway lines: the Rorschach–Heiden railway between Rorschach Hafen/Rorschach near the lake shore and Heiden, and the Rheineck–Walzenhausen mountain railway between Rheineck and Walzenhausen. Both lines are operated by Appenzell Railways and part of St. Gallen S-Bahn and Bodensee S-Bahn, respectively. A popular overlook near Heiden is Fünfländerblick (lit. 'five countries view'). In good weather conditions, the lake is also visible from mountain peaks of the Alpstein massiv. In Austria, the Pfänderbahn, an aerial tram, takes passengers from the valley station near Bregenz Hafen to the top station on Pfänder mountain (Allgäu Alps).

The Hegau region adjacent to Lower Lake Constance (Untersee) contains several higher mountains of volcanic origin, many with ruins of fortresses on their tops (e.g. Hohenkrähen, Mägdeberg). The southernly located of these Hegau volcanoes (e.g. Hohentwiel) also offer a view over the lakes.

=== Cultural events ===
Lake Constance is the location for the annual Bregenzer Festspiele, a well-known arts festival that, among other venues, takes place on a floating stage in Bregenz. The operas, plays and concerts performed are usually popular works, e.g. The Magic Flute by Wolfgang Amadeus Mozart or Rigoletto by Giuseppe Verdi.

Since 2001, the ART BODENSEE takes place in Dornbirn. It is an annual meeting point for the exchange between collectors, artists and art appreciators.

=== Biking ===
Biking around the lake is also possible on the 261 km (162 mi) long trail called "Bodensee-Radweg". It brings its visitors to the most interesting sites and goes around the whole lake. Nevertheless, various shortcuts via ferries allow shorter routes and the trail is suitable for all levels. Note: There is also a trail that goes by the name "Bodensee-Rundweg". This road was intended for pedestrians so biking is sometimes not suitable or allowed.

=== Hiking and pilgrim trails ===
Sign of the "Lake Constanze circular route"

The 260 kilometers long Lake Constance circular route, signposted as "Bodensee Rundwanderweg", leads around Lake Constance through the territories of Germany, Austria and Switzerland. It is mainly intended for hiking; cyclists follow the sometimes slightly different managed Lake Constance cycle path. The trail can be walked in smaller stages of various lengths and offers nice views of the lake, landscape and wildlife. However, due to industrial settlements, buildings and nature reserves, not all the coastal zones are readily accessible. Furthermore, in the estuary of the rivers, such the Leiblach, Bregenzer Ach, canalized Rhine and Old Rhine (Fußacher breakthrough), considerable distances have to be covered inland to the next bridge or river crossing point. Due to busy riverside roads, the Bodensee-Rundweg sometimes runs as a trail above the lake with some lookout possibilities.

Lake Constance is also a hub for long-distance hikers and pilgrims. It has been a crucial reference point of important pilgrimage routes since ancient times:

- Via Beuronensis, a Way of St. James from the Neckar region over the Swabian Alb
- the Upper Swabian pilgrimage-route of St. James, which leads from Upper Swabia to the lake and branches north of the lake both in the direction of Nonnenhorn and in the direction of Meersburg
- the Bavarian-Swabian route of St. James, which leads down from the West Allgäu to the lake
- the Schwabenweg, which ensures the connection to Switzerland to the lake near Konstanz

=== Swimming ===
Swimming in the lake is usually best from mid-June to mid-September. Depending on the weather and exact location, the water temperatures reach 20 to 27 °C (68.0 to 80.6 °F). Within one day, differences of up to 3 °C (5.4 °F) are possible with appropriate sunlight, so that the lake invites to swim, especially on warm summer evenings.

=== Diving ===
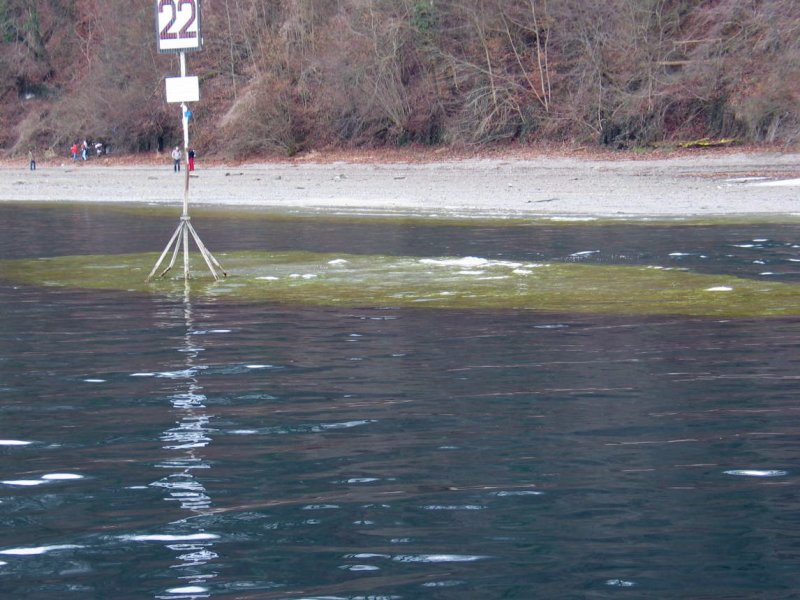
Diving spot "devils table" at Lake Constanze

Diving in Lake Constance is considered attractive and challenging. Most of the diving areas are located in the northern part of the lake (Überlingen, Bodman-Ludwigshafen, Marienschlucht and others), a few also in the south. The areas should be dived exclusively by experienced divers under the guidance of one of the local diving schools or a seasoned diver. Diving at some spots like the devils table ("Teufelstisch") called rock needle in the lake in front of the Marienschlucht, is only allowed after approval by the district office Konstanz.

A famous freshwater wreck in Europe is the paddle steamer Jura, which lies in front of Bottighofen at a depth of 39 metres (128 feet). The canton of Thurgau, the office for archaeology in Frauenfeld, has placed the Jura under protection as an underwater industrial monument.

For all divers, the water in Lake Constance—even in summer—is already below 10 °C (50 °F) from a depth of 10 metres (32.8 ft) which requires suitable cold-water regulators that do not freeze at such temperatures.

=== Boating, recreational boating ===
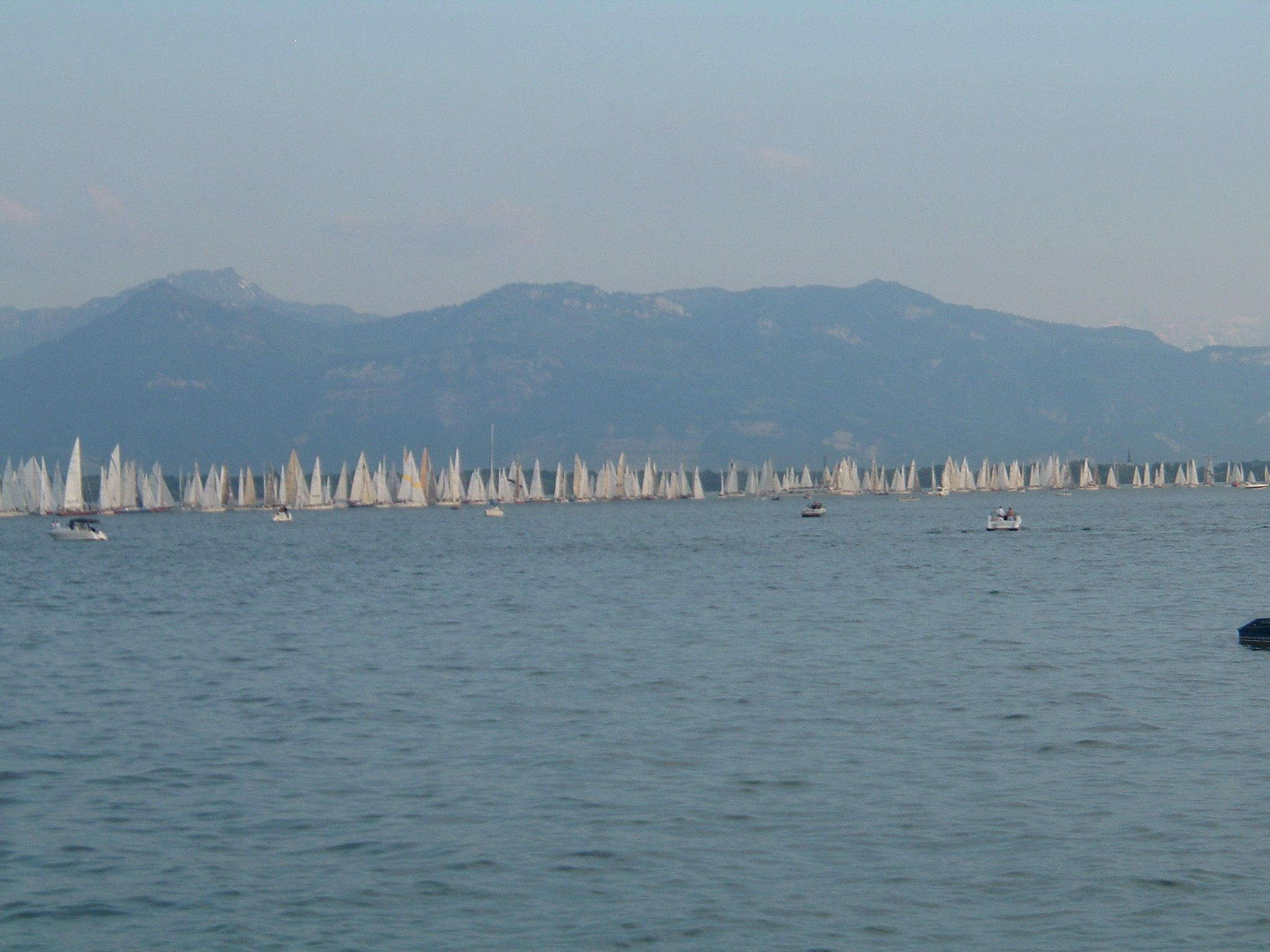
"Rund-um" (All-Around) Regatta next to Lindau

Pleasure boating is important. At the beginning of 2011, 57,875 amusement vehicles were registered for Lake Constance.

The legal basis for all shipping on the lake comes from the ordinance on shipping on Lake Constance, or "Bodensee-Schifffahrtsordnung". It is monitored on Lake Constance and on the Upper Rhine by the German, Swiss and Austrian Water Police, the "Seepolizei".

All boats must be registered, and boat drivers must hold a "Bodenseeschifferpatent" (authorization to drive a patented vehicle on Lake Constance). It is issued in Germany by the shipping offices of the district of Constance, the Lake Constance district, and the district of Lindau; in Switzerland by the cantonal authorities; and in Austria by the District Commission Bregenz. For pleasure boaters short-term guest licenses are possible (for the categories A for motorboats over 4.4 kW and D for sailboats over 12 m^{2} sail area).

Boating events

- Since 1979, every year to the assumption of Mary, Europe's largest ship procession is held on Lake Constance.
- Every year (early summer) the spectacular all-around ("Rund-um") Regatta from Lindau to Lindau via Meersburg, Überlingen, Romanshorn is organized.
- Since 2009, the annual water sports and sailing festival "International Lake Constanze week", a joint sports event takes place in Konstanz.
- In Friedrichshafen, one of the most important water sports fairs in Europe, the Interboot, takes place annually.

== Settlements on the lake ==
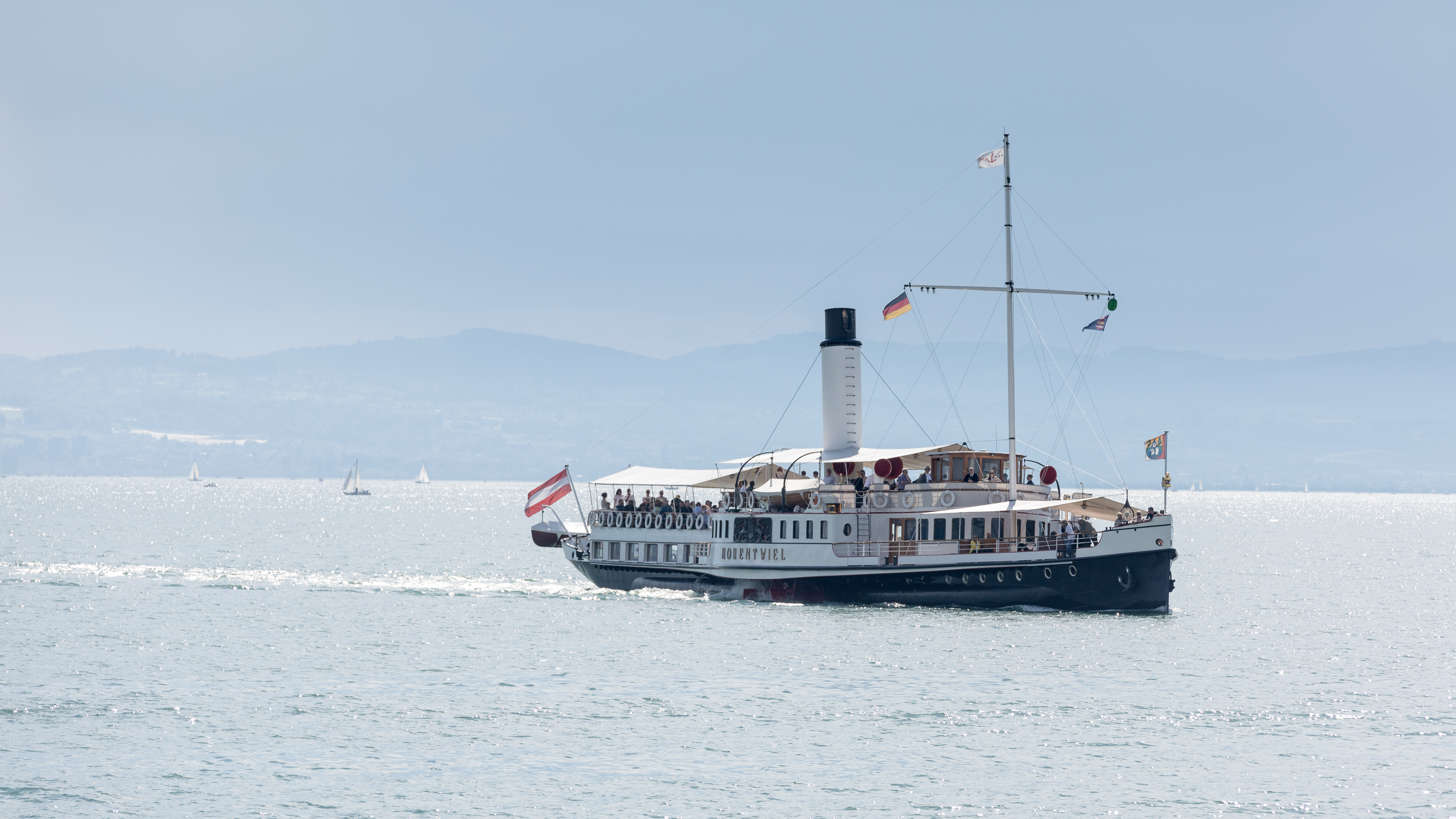
SS Hohentwiel, the last paddle steamer

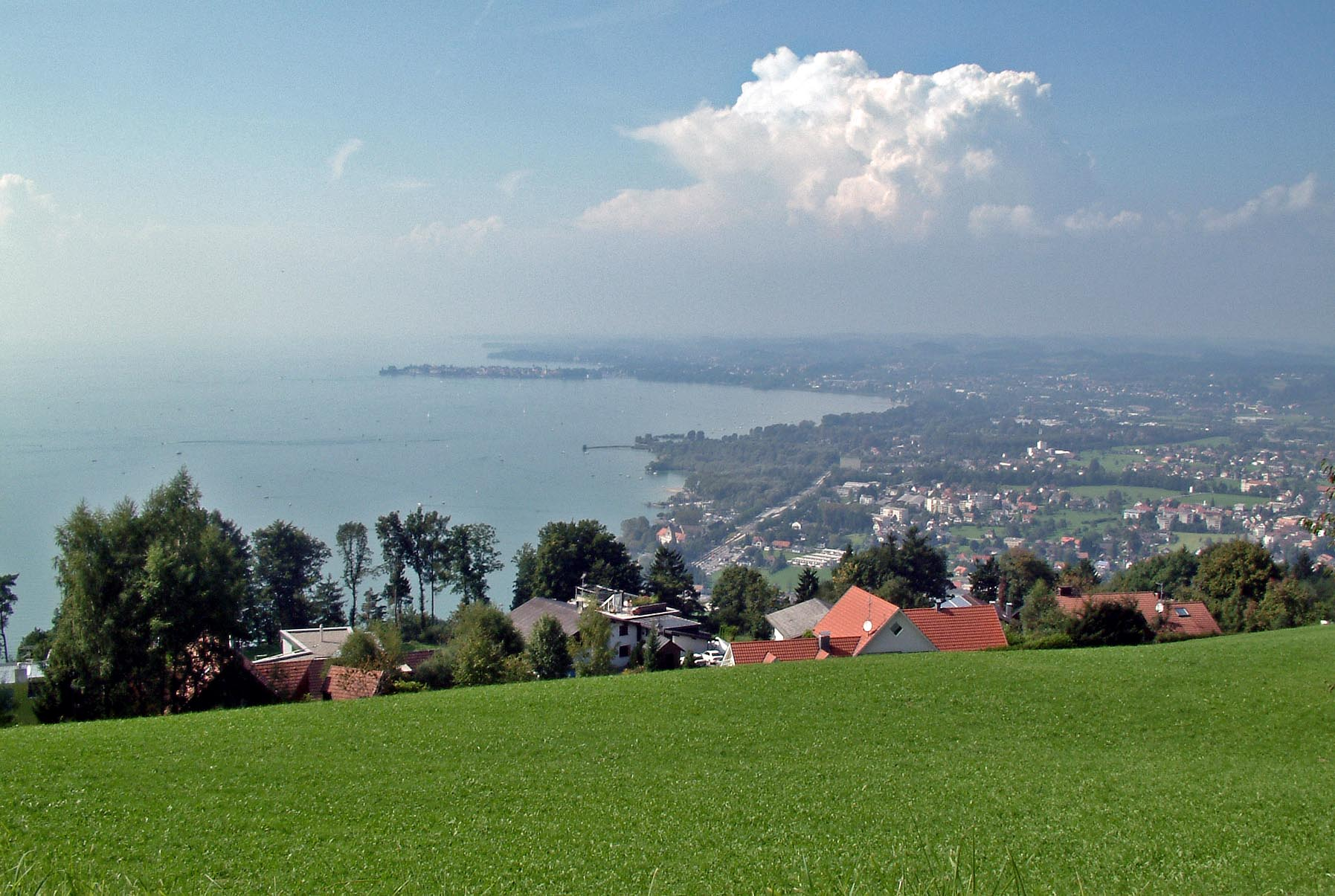
View from the Pfänder hill of Bregenz and the lake (with Lindau in the background)

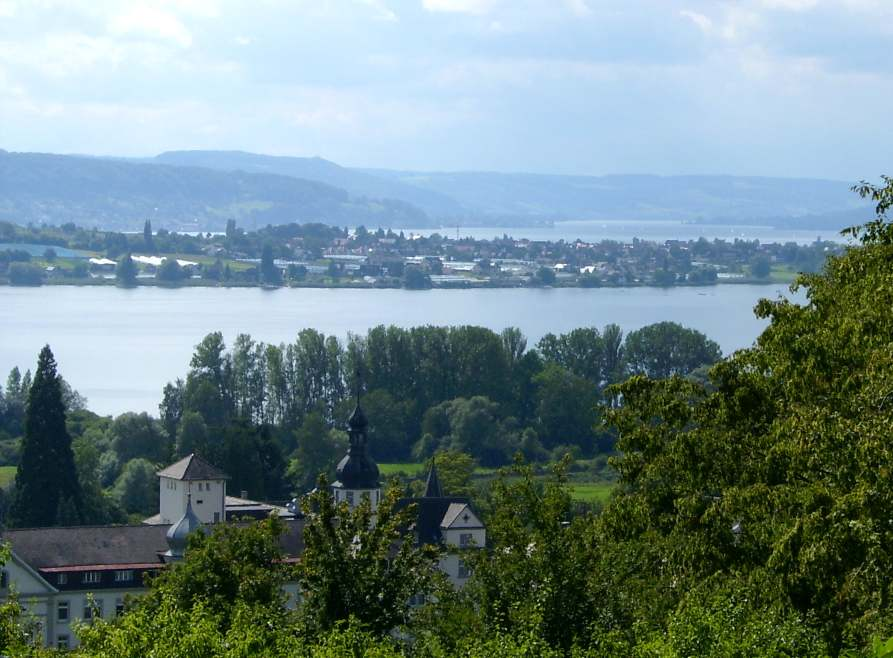
Reichenau seen from the German shore

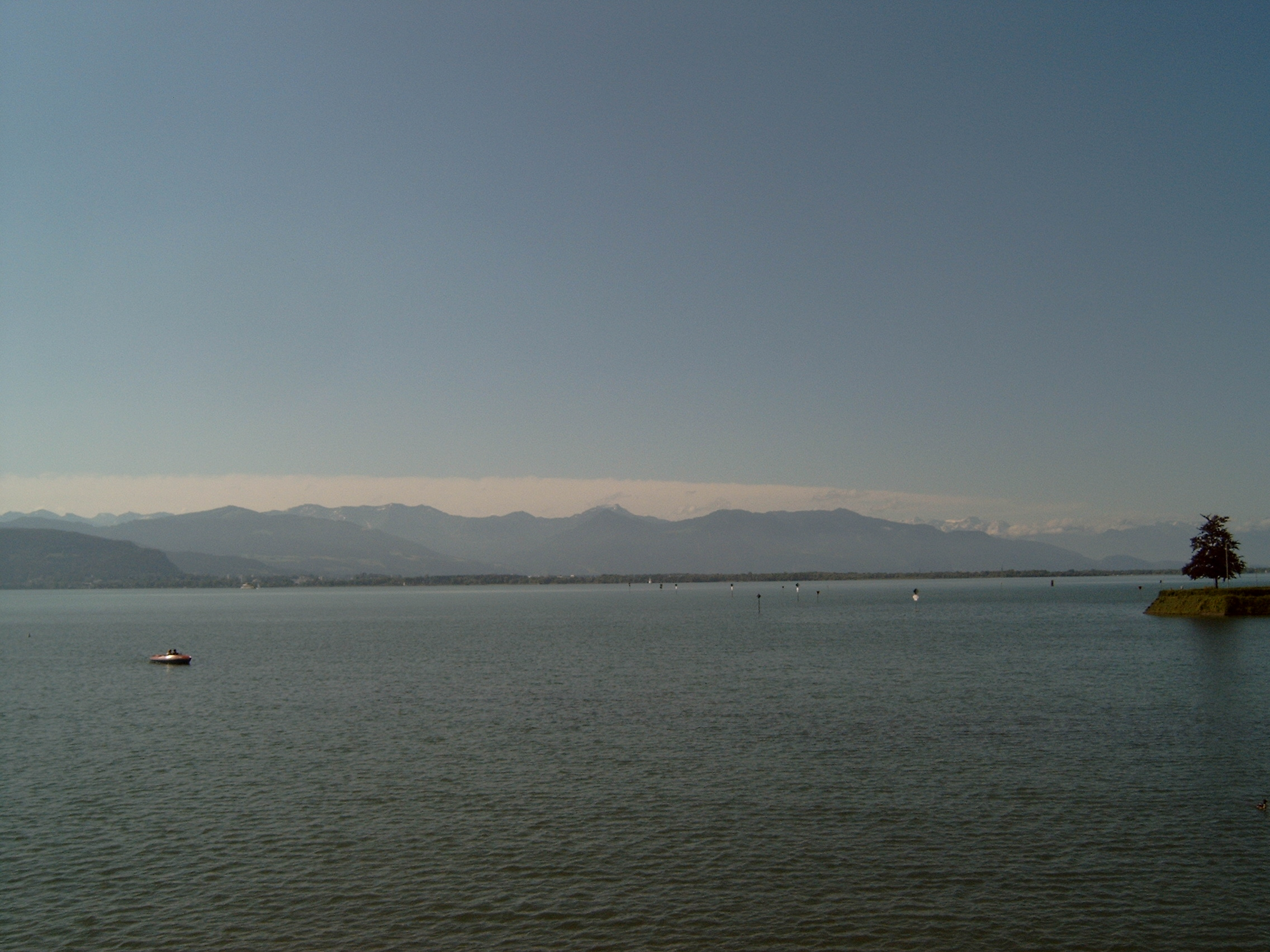
Lake Constance from Lindau

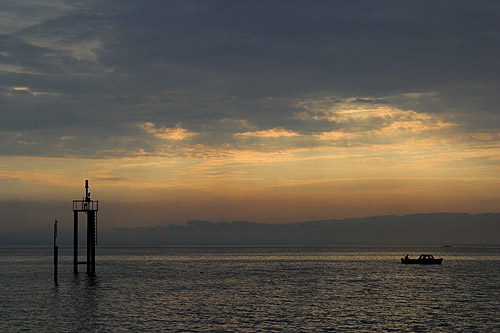
Twilight near Arbon

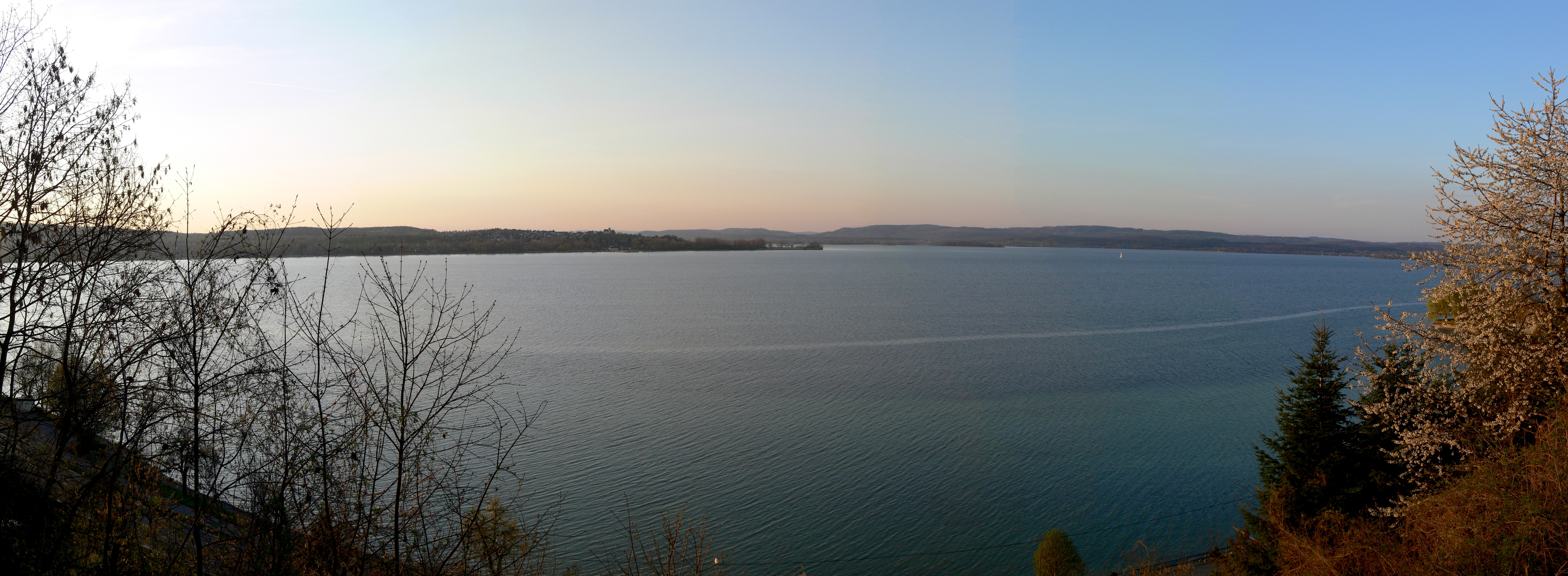
The Lower Lake (Untersee)

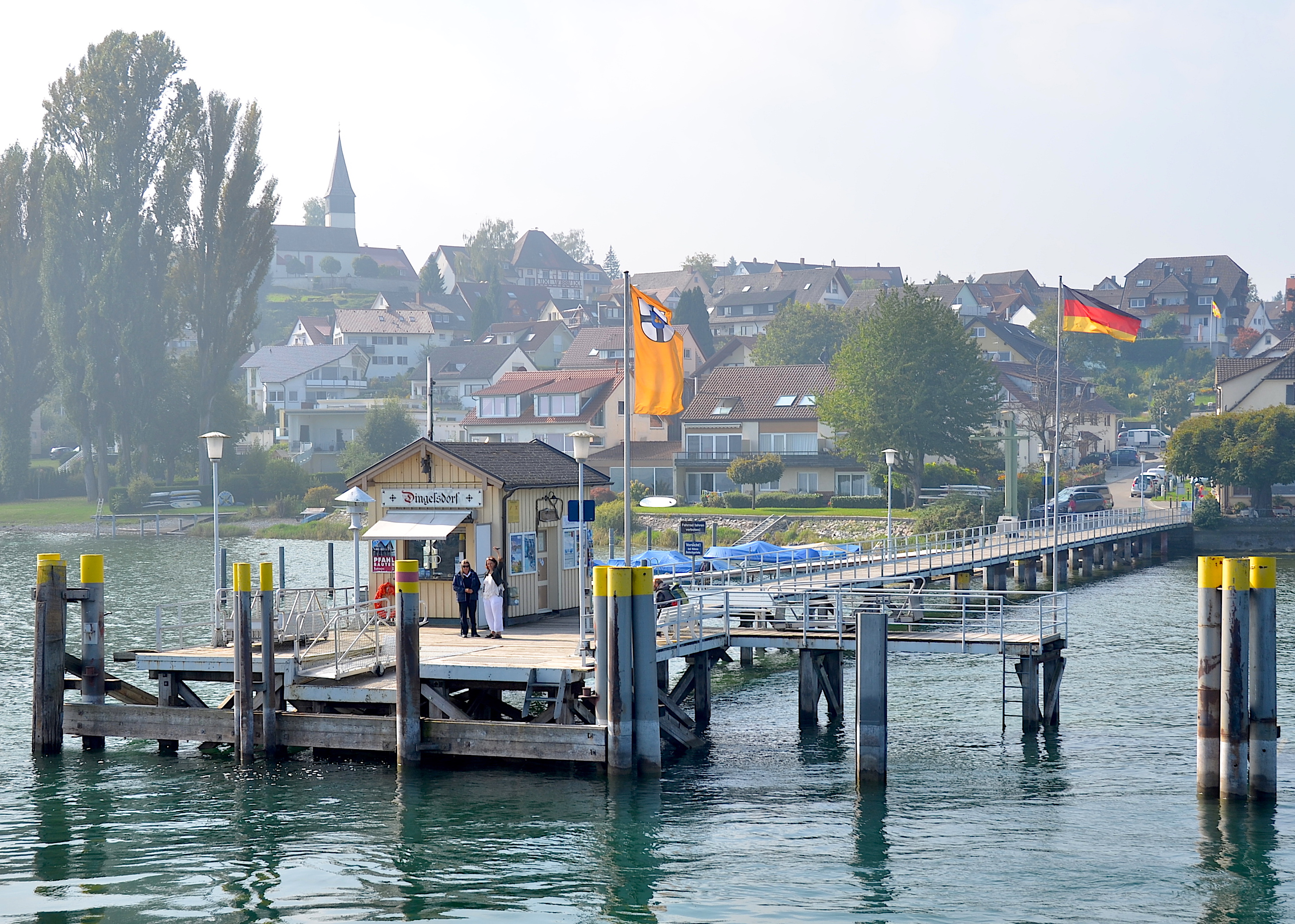
Dingelsdorf shipping pier

=== Austria ===
- Hard
- Hörbranz
- Bregenz
- Lochau
- Höchst
- Fussach
- Gaissau

=== Germany ===
From the entry of the Rhine, on the northern or right shore:

- On the Upper Lake (Obersee)
  - Lindau (in Bavaria)
  - Wasserburg
  - Nonnenhorn
  - Kressbronn (in Baden-Württemberg)
  - Langenargen
  - Eriskirch
  - Friedrichshafen
  - Immenstaad
  - Hagnau
  - Stetten
  - Meersburg
  - Uhldingen-Mühlhofen (on the Überlinger See)
  - Überlingen
  - Sipplingen
  - Ludwigshafen
  - Bodman
- Konstanz with suburbs
  - Wallhausen
  - Dingelsdorf
  - Litzelstetten
- On the Lower Lake (Untersee)
  - Reichenau (including the island with same name)
  - Allensbach (on the Gnadensee)
  - Radolfzell am Bodensee (on the Zeller See)
  - Moos
  - Gaienhofen
  - Öhningen

=== Switzerland ===
From the entry of the Rhine, on the southern or left shore:

- On the Upper Lake (Obersee)
  - Altenrhein, St. Gallen
  - Staad, St. Gallen
  - Rorschach, St. Gallen
  - Goldach, St. Gallen
  - Horn, Thurgau
  - Steinach, St. Gallen
  - Arbon, Thurgau (as all the following)
  - Frasnacht
  - Egnach
  - Salmsach
  - Romanshorn
  - Uttwil
  - Kesswil
  - Güttingen
  - Altnau
  - Landschlacht
  - Münsterlingen
  - Scherzingen
  - Bottighofen
  - Kreuzlingen (and Konstanz, Germany)
- On the Seerhein
  - Gottlieben
- On the Lower Lake (Untersee)
  - Triboltingen
  - Ermatingen
  - Mannenbach
  - Eschlibach
  - Berlingen
  - Steckborn
  - Mammern
  - Eschenz
  - Stein am Rhein, Schaffhausen

== Fishing ==
The lake was frozen in the years 1077 (?), 1326 (partial), 1378 (partial), 1435, 1465 (partial), 1477 (partial), 1491 (partial?), 1517 (partial), 1571 (partial), 1573, 1600 (partial), 1684, 1695, 1709 (partial), 1795, 1830, 1880 (partial), and 1963.

About 1,000 tonnes (1,100 short tons) of fish were caught by 150 professional fishermen in 2001 which was below the previous ten-year average of 1,200 tonnes (1,300 short tons) per year. The Lake Constance trout (Salmo trutta) was almost extinct in the 1980s due to pollution, but thanks to protective measures they have made a significant return. Lake Constance is the home of the critically endangered species of trout Salvelinus profundus, and formerly also the now extinct Lake Constance whitefish (Coregonus gutturosus).

== See also ==
- Überlingen mid-air collision
- Württembergischer Yacht Club
- Lake Constance is also the title of a track from Mike Oldfield's The Millennium Bell album
- Peter Handke's play, Ride Across lake Constance, was written in 1971.
