= Alpine Rhine =

Part of the river Rhine

Alpine Rhine (Alpenrhein)
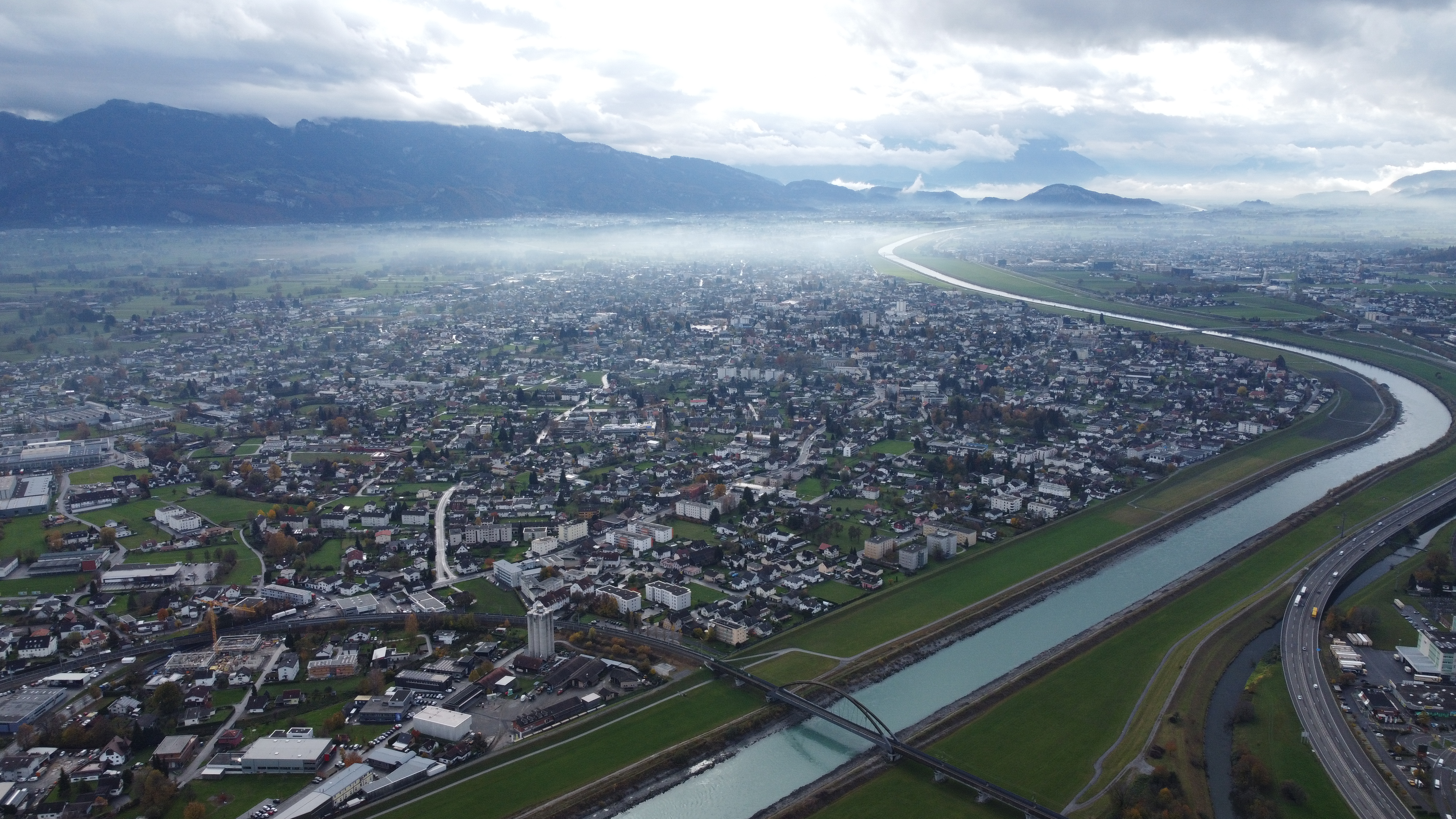
- Alpine Rhine near Lustenau

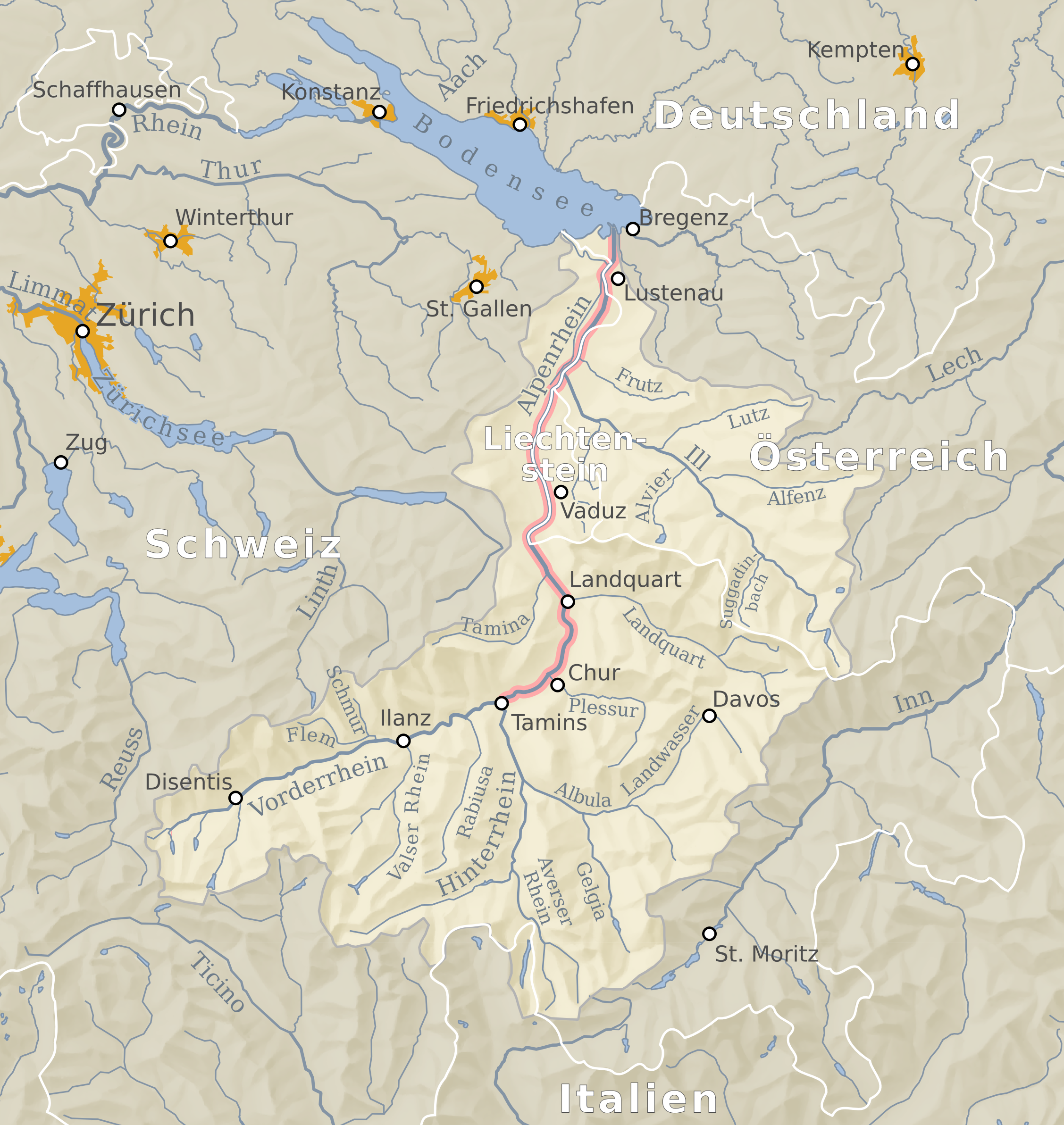

Location
- Country: Austria
- State: Vorarlberg
- Country: Liechtenstein
- Country: Switzerland
- Cantons: Grisons, St. Gallen

Physical characteristics
- Source
  - location: Confluence of Vorderrhein and Hinterrhein in Reichenau
  - coordinates: 46°49.37094′N 9°24.45204′E
  - elevation: 604 m
- Mouth
  - location: Rhine delta, Upper Lake Constance
  - coordinates: 46°49.37094′N 9°24.45204′E (of canal)
  - elevation: 395 m
- Length: 93.5 km (58.1 mi)
- Basin size: 6119 km^{2}

Basin features
- Tributaries
  - left: Saar, Tamina
  - right: Ill, Frutz, Liechtenstein inland canal, Landquart, Plessur

The Alpine Rhine (German: Alpenrhein, pronounced [ˈalpn̩ˌʁaɪn]) is the section of the river Rhine from its source in the Swiss Alps to Lake Constance. It begins in the centre of the Swiss canton of Grisons (Kanton Graubünden), and later forms the border between Switzerland to the west and Liechtenstein to the east, and later between Switzerland and Austria. It flows through the Alpine Rhine Valley.

There is no shipping on the Alpine Rhine.

== Description ==
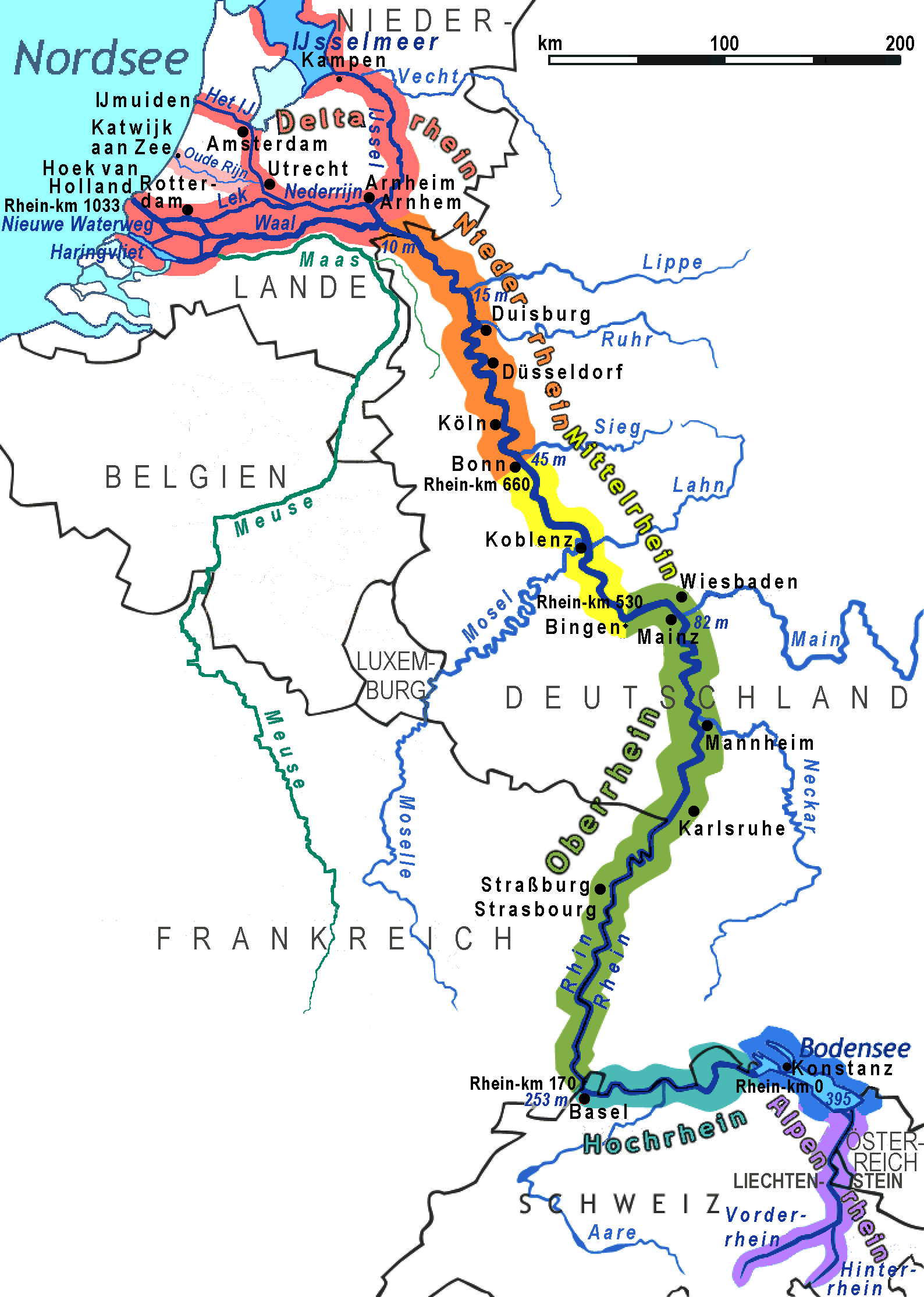
Sections of the Rhine: Rhine–Meuse–Scheldt delta Lower Rhine Middle Rhine Upper Rhine High Rhine Lake Constance (Untersee, Seerhein, Obersee) Alpine Rhine, Vorderrhein, Hinterrhein Rhine sources

The Alpine Rhine is formed near Tamins-Reichenau by the confluence of the rivers Anterior Rhine (Vorderrhein) and the Posterior Rhine (Hinterrhein). Its mouth is at the Upper Lake Constance. It descends from an elevation of 585 to 396 metres (1,919 to 1,299 ft). The river makes a distinctive turn to the north near Chur. At Landquart it turns north-east and then to the north around the Fläscherberg, east of Sargans. Near Sargans a natural dam, only a few metres high, prevents it from flowing further to the north-west into the open valley, called Seeztal, and then consequently through Lake Walen (and further to Lake Zurich into the river Aare).

The Alpine Rhine is flanked by the Alps and its mountain ranges (especially Alpstein, Plessuralpen, Rätikon Calanda, the Albula Alps and the Glarner Alps), some higher than 3,000 m (9,800 ft). The highest mountain, Ringelspitz, commences next to Tamins. At 3,247 m (10,653 ft), it is the highest peak of the canton of St. Gallen, bordering the valley to its southeast.

Besides the Vorderrhein and Hinterrhein, the Alpine Rhine has only a few other larger tributaries. Its main right tributaries are the Plessur (in Chur), the Landquart in Landquart, the Liechtenstein inland canal in Liechtenstein (near the northern end of the country), and the Ill and Frutz in Austria (Vorarlberg). Main left tributaries, all located in Switzerland, are the Tamina (in Bad Ragaz) and the Saar (in Trübbach).

Designations

Ramsar Wetland
- Official name: Rheindelta
- Designated: 16 December 1982
- Reference no.: 275

The mouth of the Rhine into Lake Constance forms an inland delta. The delta is delimited in the west by the Old Rhine and in the east by a modern canalized section. Most of the delta is a nature reserve and bird sanctuary and has been designated as a Ramsar site since 1982. It includes the Austrian towns of Gaißau, Höchst and Fußach. The natural Rhine originally branched into at least two arms and formed small islands by precipitating sediments.

A regulation of the Rhine was called for, with an upper canal near Diepoldsau and a lower canal at Fußach, in order to counteract the constant flooding and strong sedimentation in the western Rhine Delta. To build and maintain the levees, the International Rhine Regulation Railway was constructed. The Dornbirner Ach had to be diverted, too, and it now flows parallel to the canalized Rhine into the lake. Its water has a darker color than the Rhine; the latter's lighter suspended load comes from higher up the mountains. It is expected that the continuous input of sediment into the lake will silt up the lake. This has already happened to the former Lake Tuggenersee.

The cut-off Old Rhine at first formed a swamp landscape. Later an artificial ditch of about 2 kilometres (1.2 mi) was dug. It was made navigable to the Swiss town of Rheineck.

== Alpine Rhine Valley ==
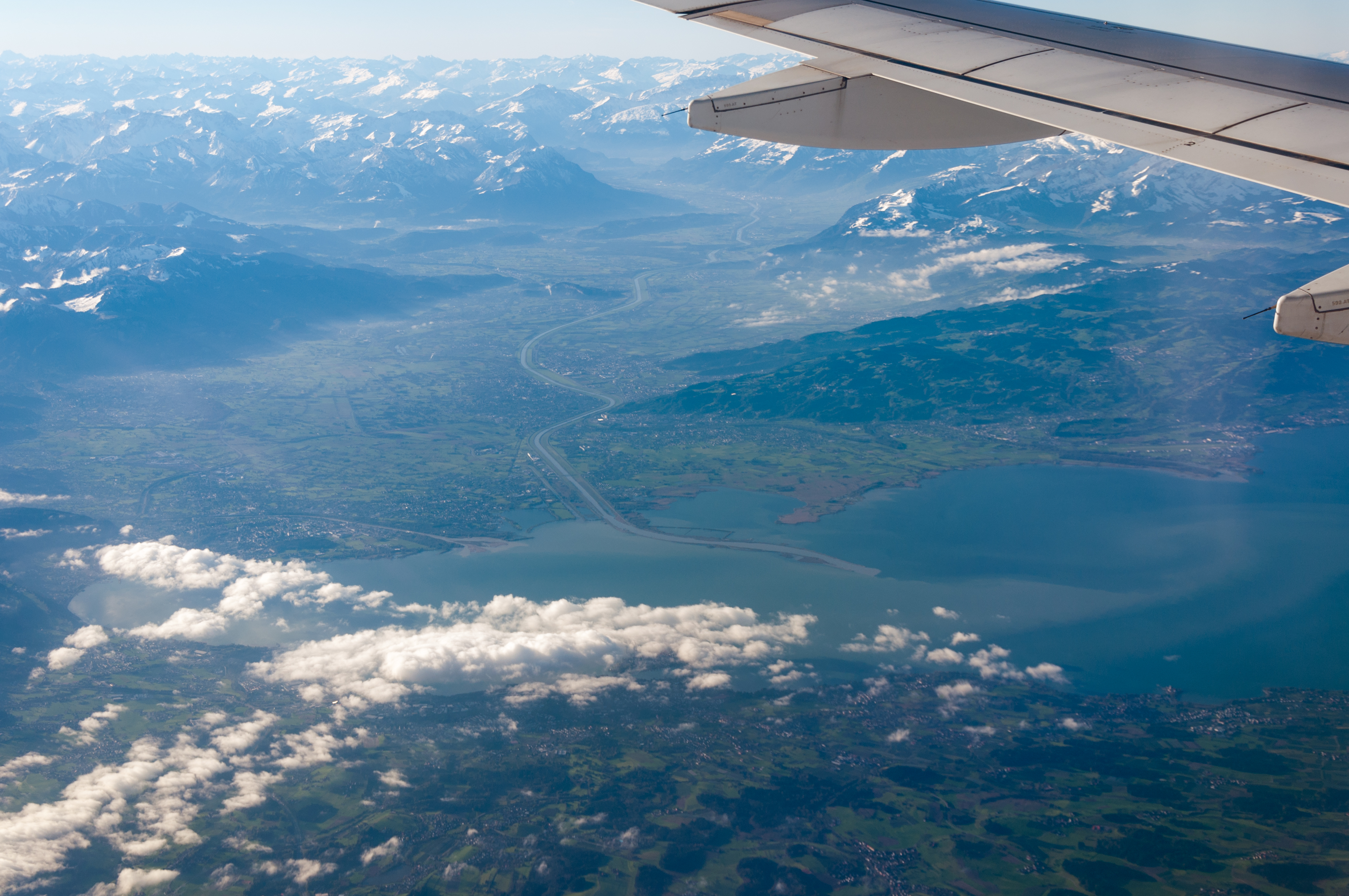
The mouth of the Alpine Rhine in Upper Lake Constance, and the Alpine Rhine Valley looking south

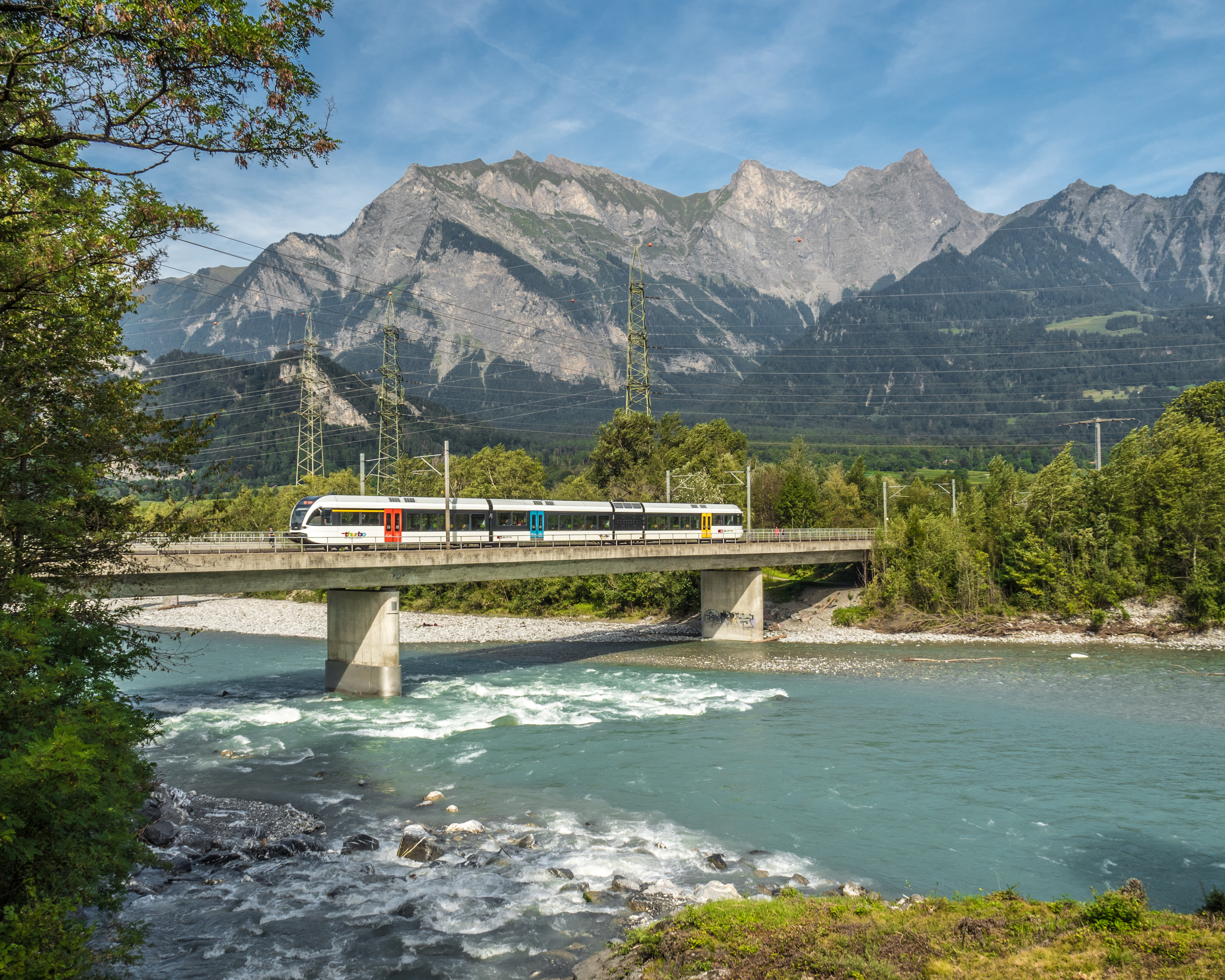
Thurbo trainset crossing the Alpine Rhine between Bad Ragaz and Maienfeld

The Alpine Rhine Valley (German: Alpenrheintal) is a glacial alpine valley, formed by the Alpine Rhine (German: Alpenrhein [ˈalpm̩ʁaɪn]), the part of the Rhine between the confluence of the Anterior Rhine and Posterior Rhine at Reichenau and Lake Constance. It covers three countries, with sections of the river demarcating the borders between Austria and Switzerland and between Liechtenstein and Switzerland. The full length of the Alpine Rhine is 93.5 km.

From Reichenau, the Alpine Rhine flows east, passing Chur and turning north, before it turns north-east at Landquart, and then roughly north, east of Sargans. From here, the Alpine Rhine forms the border between the canton of St. Gallen of Switzerland on the left, west side, and the Principality of Liechtenstein on the east side. About 28 kilometres (17 mi) further down, the Rhine then meets the Austrian federal state Vorarlberg and finally flows into Lake Constance, south of Lindau (Germany), which is no longer part of the Rhine Valley. The Swiss-Austrian border follows the historical bed of the Rhine, but today the river follows an artificial canal within Austria for the final 5 kilometres (3.1 mi), parallel to the also canalised Dornbirner Ach. The border also still follows the old river bed at Diepoldsau.

The Rhine Valley's upper third has the character of an Alpine valley, enclosing a bottom plain of about 1 to 4 kilometres (0.6 to 2.5 mi) across. Downstream of Vaduz, the valley widens considerably, developing into a broad plain, measuring some 10 kilometres (6.2 mi) across at its lower end along the southeastern shores of Upper Lake Constance. The latter is separated from the Lower Lake Constance by a short stretch of the Rhine, called the Seerhein (English: Lake Line). From the point of the Rhine's emergence from Lower Lake Constance, it is known as the High Rhine (Hochrhein).

Right tributaries of the Alpine Rhine are the Plessur in Chur, the Landquart in the town of the same name, the Ill and Frutz on the Upper Land of the Austrian plain near Feldkirch. Several rivers in Liechtenstein drain into a canal, which carries the water to the Alpine Rhine. The Alpine Rhine has no major left tributaries; creeks joining it from the left are the Oldisbach at Chur, Cosenz at Untervaz, Säge at Tardisbrücke, Tamina at Bad Ragaz, Saar at Trübbach, Tobelbach at Buchs, Simml at Gams. Though all left tributaries in the St. Gall Rhine Valley are collected by the Rheintaler Binnenkanal, which flows into Lake of Constance by Alter Rhein, and never meets the Alpine Rhine anymore.

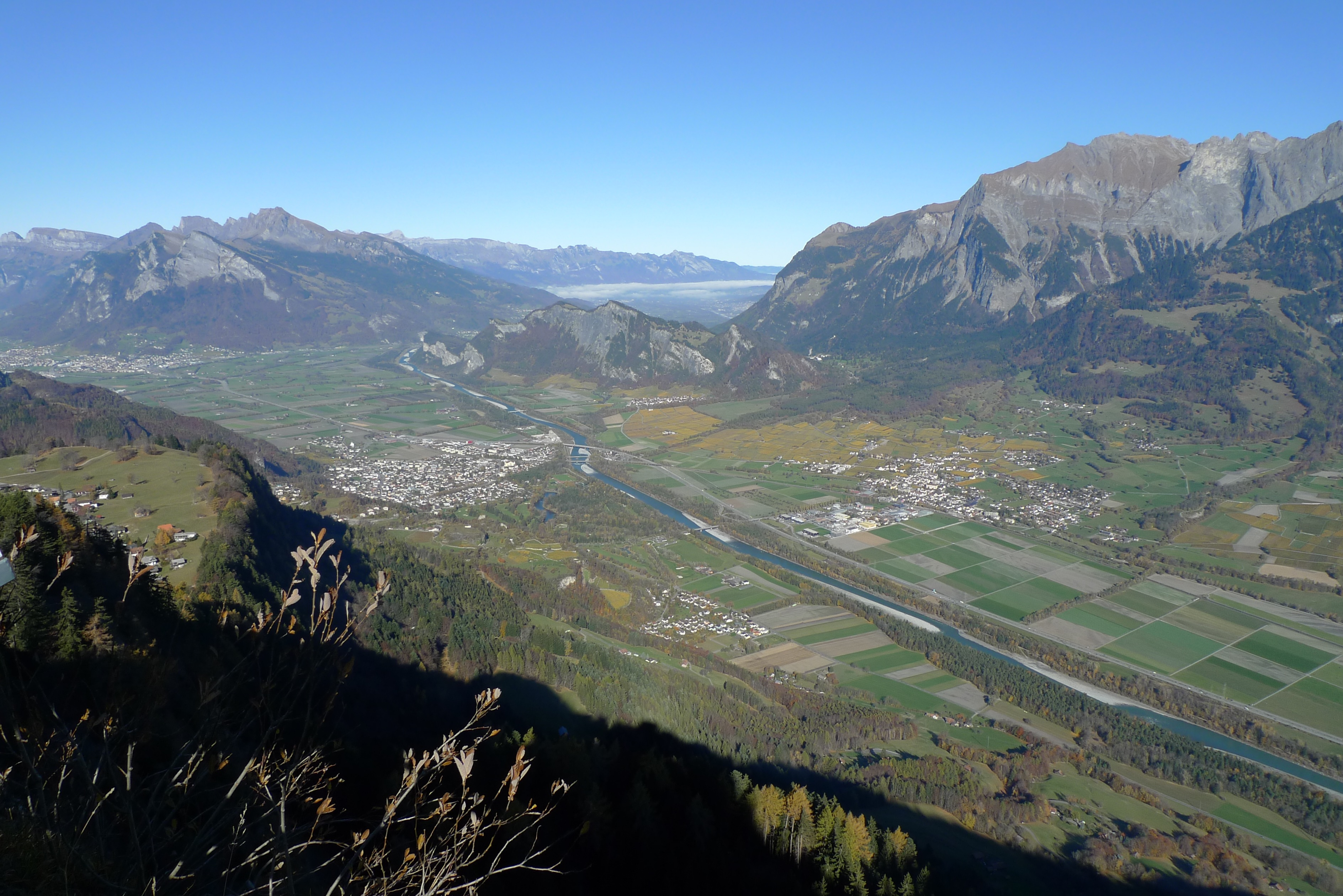
The end of the Grisonian Rhine Valley. In front: Bad Ragaz on the left and Maienfeld on the right.

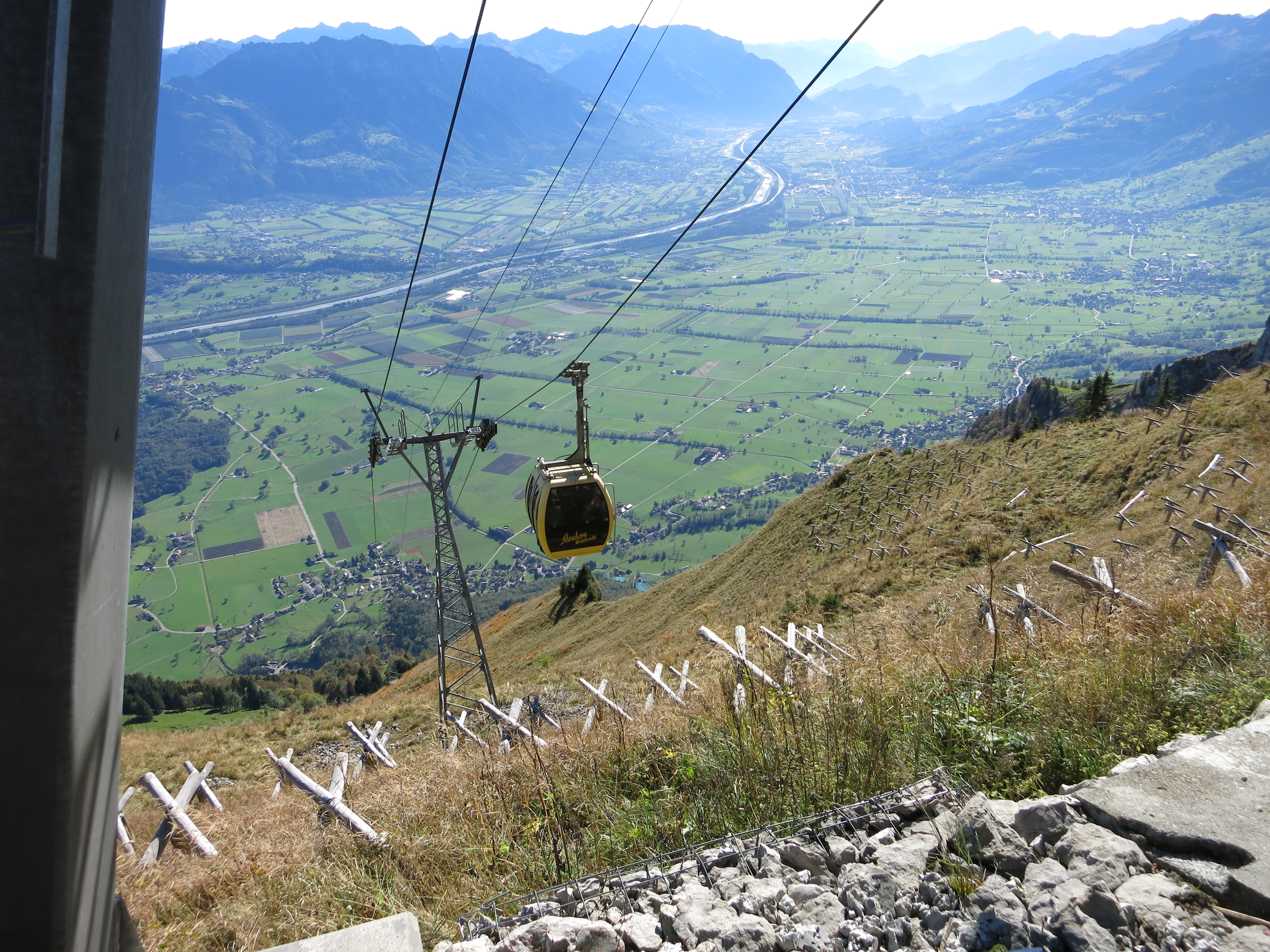
St. Gall Rhine Valley (right of the river) and Liechtenstein Rhine Valley (seen from Mt. Stauberen (1,745 m (5,725 ft))

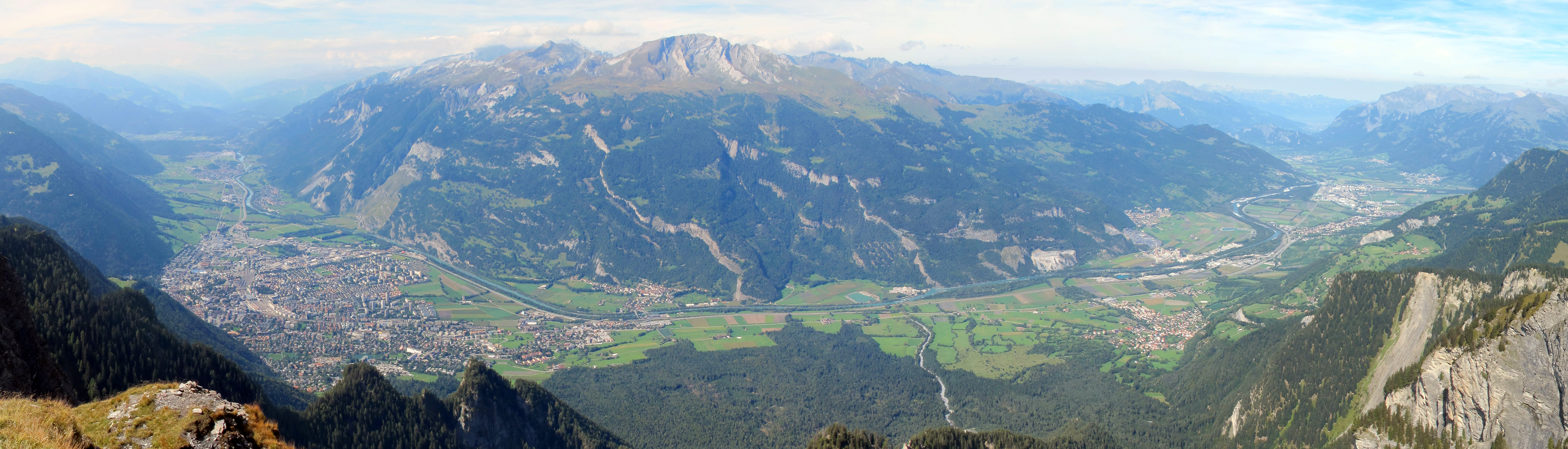
Chur Rhine Valley with Chur

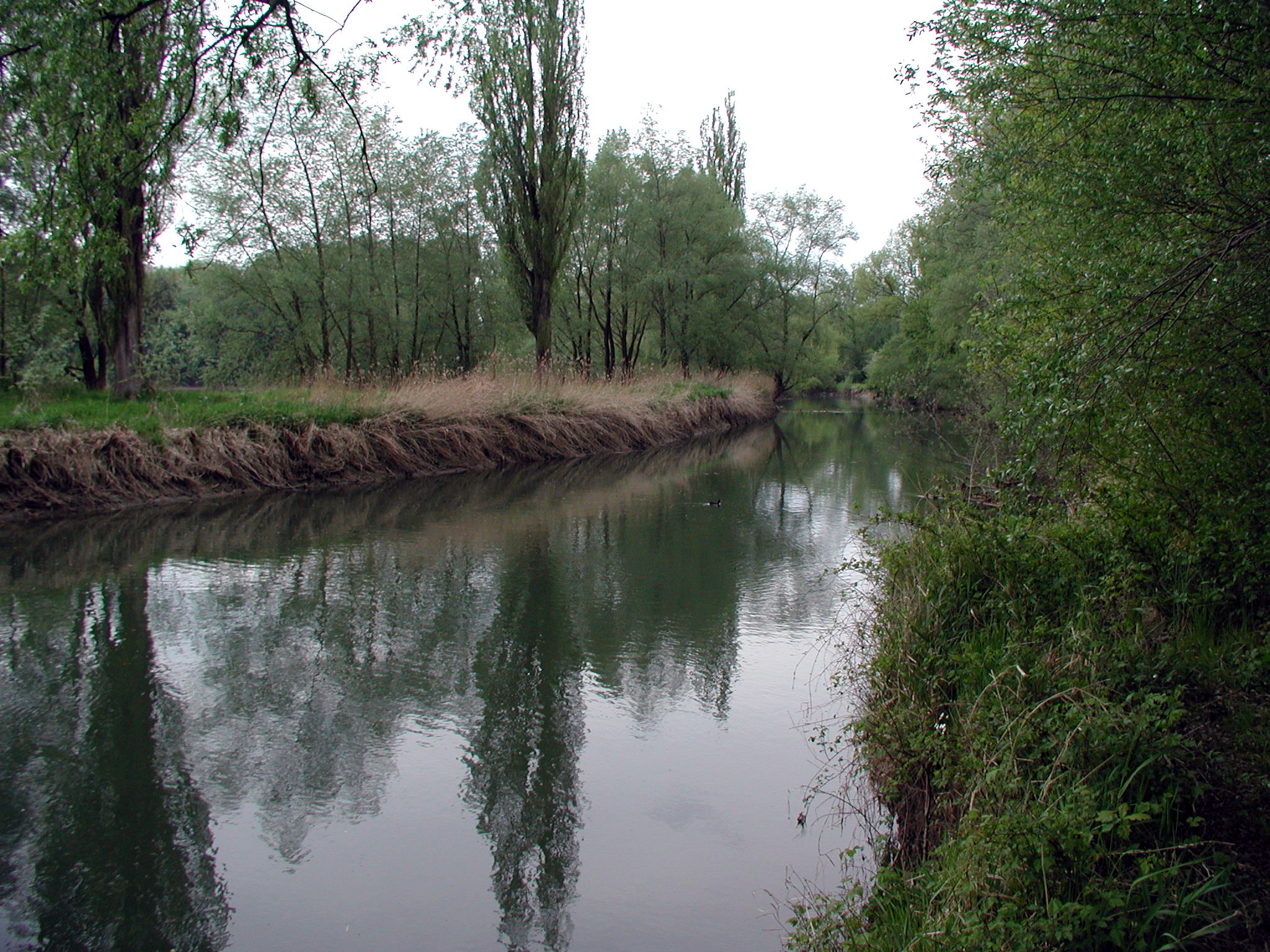
The Old Rhine (Alter Rhein) in Höchst

=== History ===
The valley of the Alpine Rhine was part of the ancient Roman province of Raetia. The Alemannic people settled the lower Rhine Valley in the early Middle Ages. Under the Frankish Empire, the Rheintal between Montstein and Hirschensprung was given to the Rhinegraviate (the county of the Rheingau), and its first recorded mention is in 891; the area between Lake Constance and Montstein was a part of the Thurgau.

Rule of the Rhine Valley was fragmented throughout the Middle Ages, with the Holy Roman Emperor, the Bishop of Constance, the Abbot of St Gall and the counts of Bregenz and Werdenberg all claiming various portions of the valley. It was not until 1348 that the Rheintal was united, under the county of Werdenberg-Heiligenberg. From when the Habsburgs acquired the county of Tyrol in 1363, they gradually began to gain control of the Rhine Valley, gaining the whole valley through a combination of conquest and purchase by 1395.

== See also ==
- International Rhine Regulation Railway
- List of rivers of Austria
- List of rivers of Liechtenstein
- List of rivers of Switzerland
