= Austria–Switzerland border =

International border

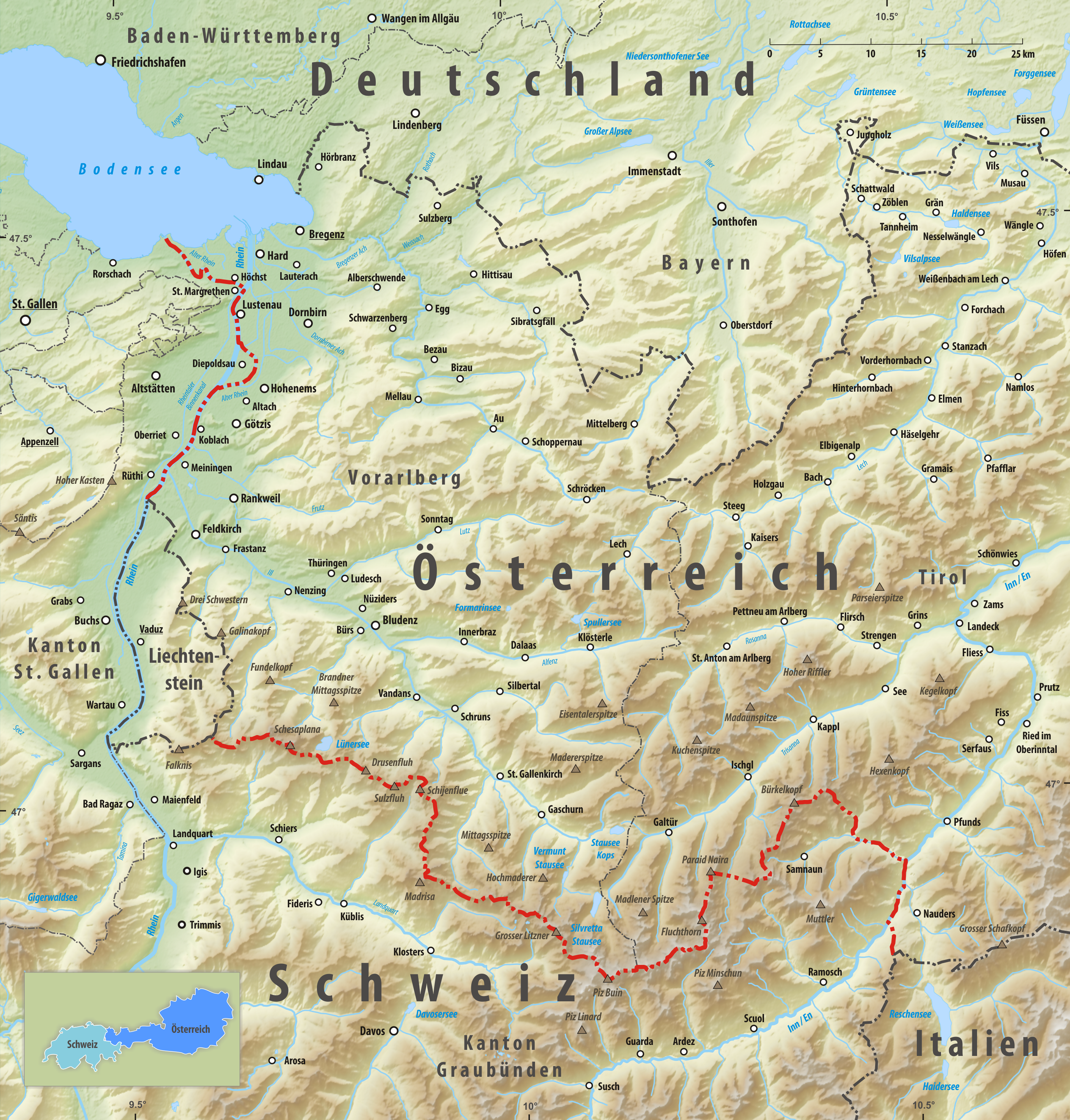
- Relief map showing the two border sections (in red) between Switzerland and Austria

Characteristics
- Entities: Austria Switzerland
- Length: 180 km (112 mi)

History
- Current shape: 1798; Foundation of the Helvetic Republic

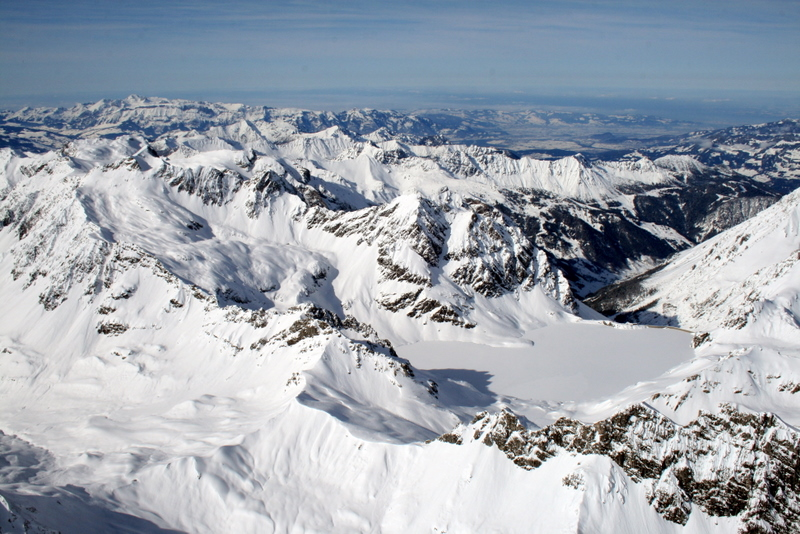
Aerial view of Lünersee, with the Swiss-Austrian border running along the ridge in the foreground; Schesaplana is visible center left, Säntis in the background left, and the Alpine Rhine Valley and Lake Constance in the background right

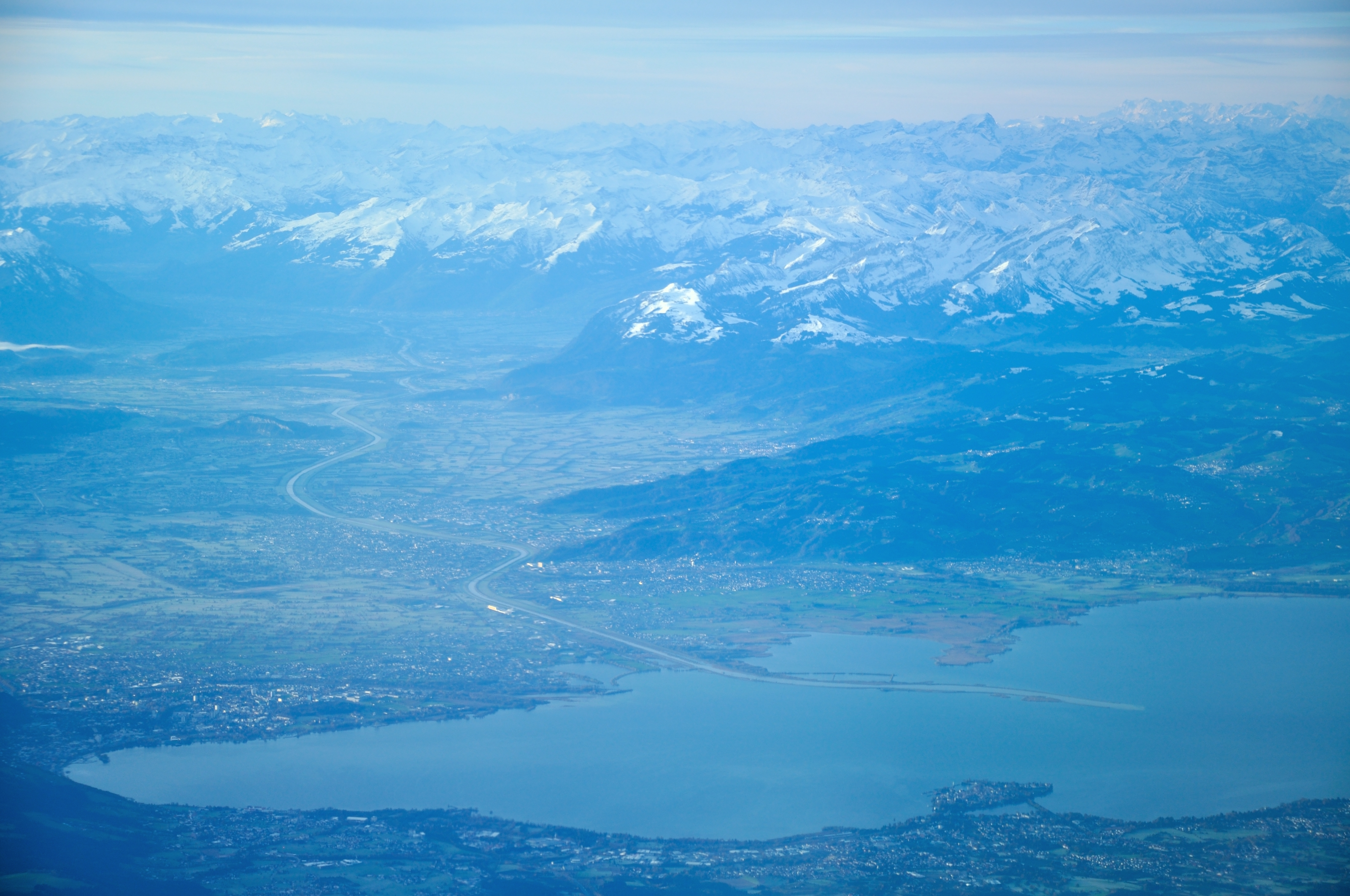
Alpine Rhine with new (left) and old (right) river delta at Lake Constance

The border between the modern states of Austria and Switzerland is divided into two parts, separated by the Principality of Liechtenstein, with a total length of 180 km (110 mi). The longer, southern stretch runs across the Grison Alps and the shorter one following mostly the Alpine Rhine (which was straightened), except near Diepoldsau and between Lustenau and Lake Constance, where it follows the Old Rhine bed. The border continues northward to the Austrian-Swiss-German tripoint located within Upper Lake Constance.

== History ==
The course of the border ultimately reflects the success of the various rivals of the House of Habsburg (most notably the Old Swiss Confederacy and the Three Leagues) in limiting the influence of the Habsburg Archdukes of Austria in the original Habsburg domains west of the Rhine in the 14th and 15th centuries. Most of the Alpine part of the border had already been the outer border of the Three Leagues since the 15th century (with the exception of the Vinschgau, which was acquired by Austria only in 1499 and remained disputed territory into the 18th century). By contrast, the Alpine Rhine Valley has a complicated feudal history (having been partly acquired by the Counts of Toggenburg during the 14th and 15th centuries), but the territories on its left bank had become subject territories of the Swiss Confederacy by the 17th century.

The current border is a product of the creation of the Helvetic Republic in 1798. During the 19th century it was part of the western border of the Austrian Empire and later Austria-Hungary, and in the 20th century of the First Austrian Republic, the Federal State of Austria, Nazi Germany and Allied-occupied Austria, and eventually of modern Austria since its formation in 1955. Liechtenstein was created as an independent principality under the Peace of Pressburg (1805), although it remained nominally a member of the Confederation of the Rhine until 1866.

Switzerland's accession to the Schengen Area in December 2008 removed all passport checks between the two countries. However, Swiss and Austrian customs officials retain a presence at well-frequented border crossings as they still have the authority to stop travellers to carry out customs checks, as Switzerland is outside the EU Customs Union.

In 2008, the two countries hosted the UEFA Euro football tournament.

== Geography ==
As shown on the National Map of Switzerland, the Swiss-Austrian-Italian tripoint is north of Piz Lad, in the Engadin. The border follows the Inn River between Martina and Nauders and then runs west towards Samnaun. It cuts across the High Alps, connecting the peaks of Grübelekopf (2,894 m or 9,495 ft), Bürkelkopf (3,033 m or 9,951 ft), Greitspitz (2,867 m or 9,406 ft), Piz Rots (3,097 m or 10,161 ft), Fluchthorn (3,398 m or 11,148 ft), Augstenberg (3,230 m or 10,600 ft), Piz Buin (3,312 m or 10,866 ft) and Gross Seehorn (3,122 m or 10,243 ft), roughly following the northern watershed of Engadin, and then to Isentällispitz (2,873 m or 9,426 ft) and Schesaplana (2,964 m or 9,724 ft), along the northern watershed of Prättigau valley, meeting the southern tripoint of Switzerland, Austria and Liechtenstein at Naafkopf (2,570 m or 8,430 ft).

From the northern Swiss-Austrian-Liechtenstein tripoint, the Swiss-Austrian border follows the Alpine Rhine (which also forms the Swiss-Liechtenstein border), passing east of Diepoldsau and reaching Lake Constance at the Rhine delta of the Old Rhine near Rheineck and Gaissau, respectively; the new delta of the straightened Alpine Rhine lies entirely within Austria. The Swiss-Austrian-German tripoint is within Lake Constance.

From the Swiss-Austrian-Italian tripoint to the Dreiländerspitze, between Jamspitze and Piz Buin, the border is between the Austrian state of Tyrol and the Swiss canton of Graubünden (Grisons). From Dreiländerspitze to the Swiss-Austrian-Liechtenstein tripoint, the border lies between the Austrian state of Vorarlberg and the canton of Grisons. North of Liechtenstein, the border separates Vorarlberg from the canton of St. Gallen.

The ski areas Ischgl (of Austria) and Samnaun (of Switzerland) are connected on high altitude and form a combined cross-border ski area. Thanks to the Schengen Agreement it is without border control.

== Transportation ==
As of the December 2023 timetable change, cross-border services between Austria and Switzerland exist on two railway lines crossing the Alpine Rhine:

- St. Margrethen–Lauterach line between Lustenau and St. Margrethen (served by S3, R5, S7, EC)
- Feldkirch–Buchs railway, which passes through Liechtenstein, with Austria–Liechtenstein border stations Tisis and Nendeln (previously Schaanwald), and Liechtenstein–Switzerland border stations Schaan-Vaduz and Buchs SG (served by S2, EC, EN, NJ, RJX)

Cross-border S-Bahn services are marketed as Bodensee S-Bahn.

There is also the International Rhine Regulation Railway, an industrial railway built for the straightening of the Alpine Rhine, which is presently used as a heritage railway on the Austrian side.

Currently, no railway line exists across the southern section of the border. There have been plans in the past to connect the Rhätische Bahn network at Scuol-Tarasp (canton of Grisons) with the Arlberg Railway at Landeck-Zams via the Reschenscheideckbahn, but the latter was never completed. There are plans to build this line with a connector to Scuol in the future. There are several bus routes across the southern section of the border.

== See also ==
- Austria–Switzerland relations
- Passes of the Silvretta and Rätikon Ranges
- Central Eastern Alps
- Rätikon
- Silvretta Alps
