= Rhine Regulation =

Correction of waterflow of the Rhine in Austria and Switzerland in the early 20th century

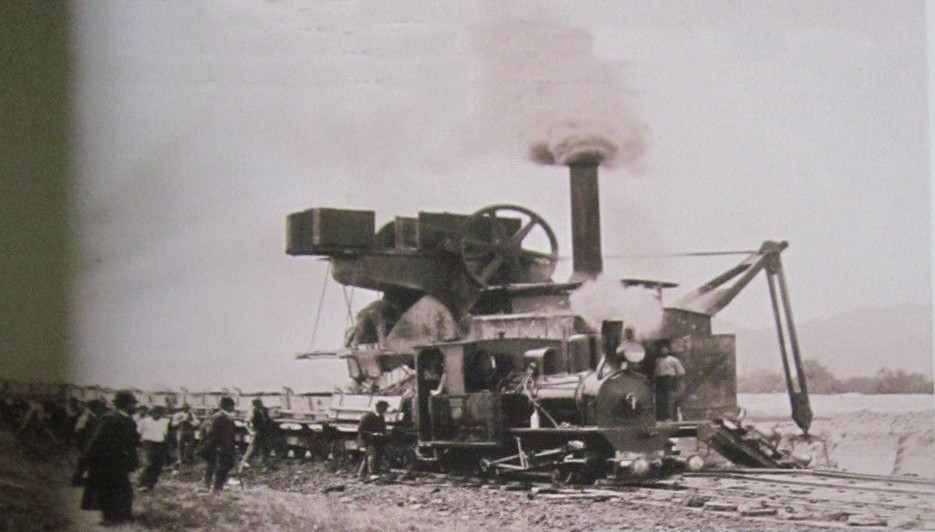
Narrow gauge locomotive and steam-powered digger near Fussach in the late 19th century

The Regulation of the Rhine (German: Rheinregulierung) or Rhine Correction (Rheinkorrektion), refers to the canalisation of the Alpine Rhine on the border between Austria and Switzerland in the late 19th/early 20th century. Its aim was to reduce the risk of flooding and to re-route the international border which ran along the old course of the Rhine.

== History ==
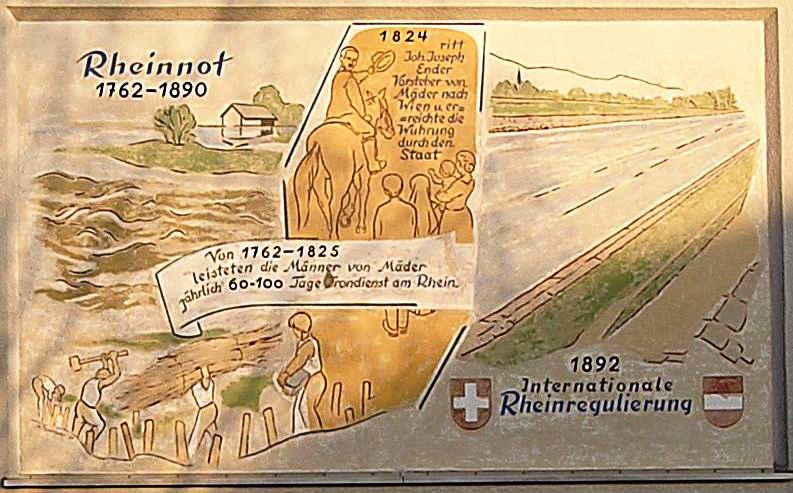
Mural with the inscription Rheinnot 1762–1890 ("Rhine Emergency 1762-1890") on the façade of the municipal office in Mäder.

The oldest record of flooding on the Alpine Rhine dates to 1206. One of the worst instances took place on 28 September 1868, when almost the whole of the Rhine valley from Sevelen to Lake Constance stood under water. The embankment broke at three points. The Alpine Rhine meandered through the Alpine Rhine Valley in a riverbed 200 to 300 m (660 to 980 ft) wide, accompanied on both sides by inland waters and embankments 500 to 1,000 m (1,600 to 3,300 ft) apart. From 1861 to 1881, the canton of St. Gallen, supported by the Swiss Federal Treasury, the Principality of Liechtenstein and the Austrian Empire, created a regular riverbed between Landquart and Au. However, the capacity of the river bed was still insufficient, which is why the embankments were raised again by 1890.

More than 30 streams still flowed into the Alpine Rhine below Landquart. At high water these were filled up and flooded. As a result, the 20.8 km (12.9 mi) long Werdenberg Canal was built in less than two years, from 1882 to 1884, collecting all the tributaries between Wartau and Rüthi and feeding their waters into the Rhine. Twenty years later the Rhine Valley Canal was opened, collecting all the streams from Rüthi to Au. In 1910, the Vorarlberg Rhine Valley Canal was completed, which drained the area between the catchments of the Frutz and Dornbirner Ach. The Liechtenstein inland canal, just under 25 km (16 mi) long, was not finished until 1943.

For the construction and maintenance of the levees on the Swiss and Austrian side of the Alpine Rhine, the International Rhine Regulation Railway was constructed. It opened in 1892 and since 2008 it is a heritage railway.

=== 1892 Treaty ===
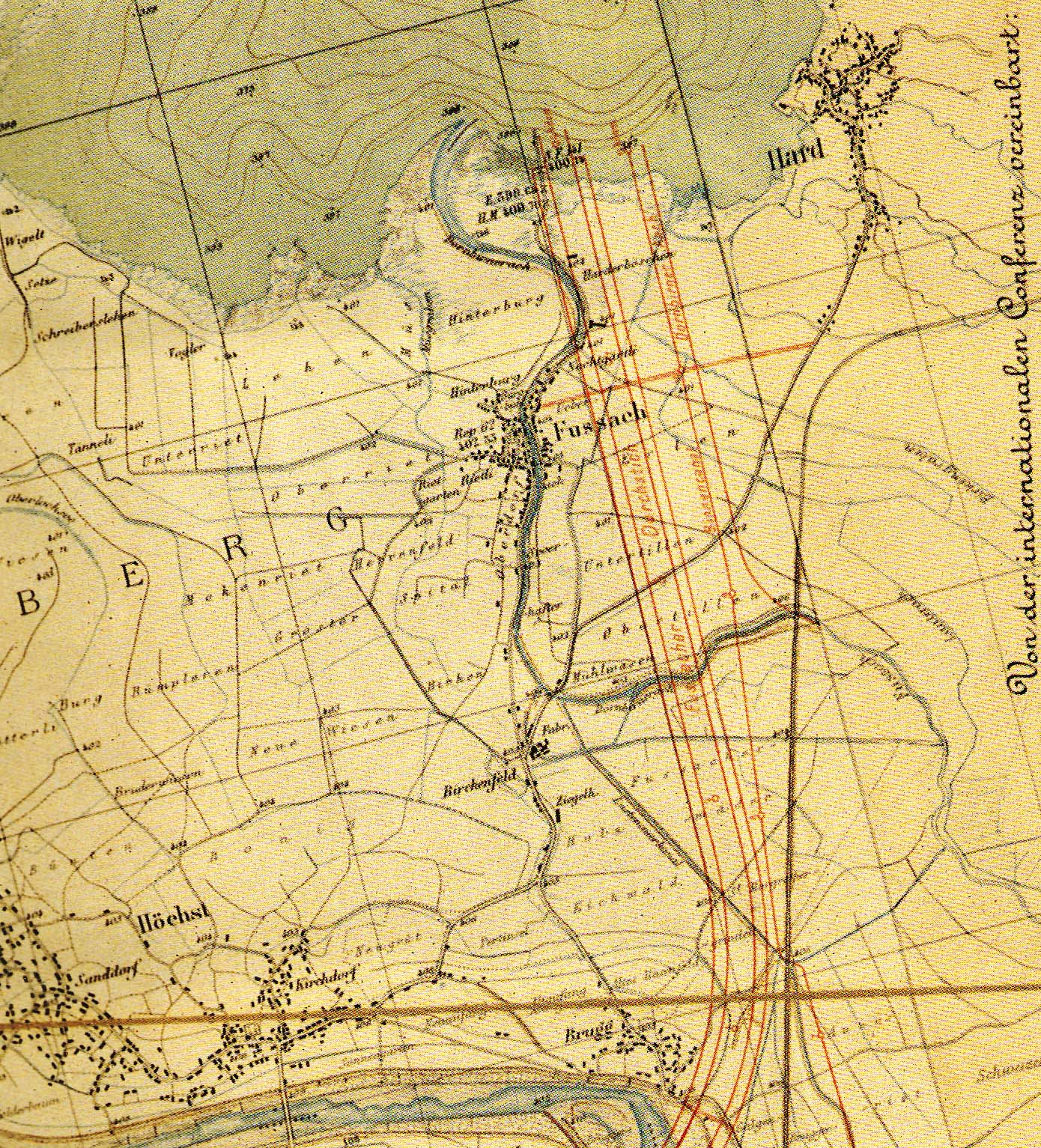
Map of the Rhine Regulation as an official annext to the state treaty

The 1892 treaty between Austria-Hungary and Switzerland on the regulation of the Rhine put to an end the many flood disasters on the Alpine Rhine between Sargans and Lake Constance, reducing the course of the river by means of two cuts in order to increase the gradient, raise the flow rate of the river and prevent deposition of sediments. The company, Internationale Rheinregulierung (IRR) is the umbrella under which the two countries, Austria and Switzerland, coordinated the construction and they still maintain the banks today. They have their head office in Rorschach, Switzerland, and a construction department in Austrian Lustenau and Swiss St. Gallen.

== See also ==
- Correction of the Rhône upstream of Lake Geneva

== Literature ==
- Internationale Rheinregulierung (publ.): Der Alpenrhein und seine Regulierung. Internationale Rheinregulierung 1892–1992. 2nd edn., BuchsDruck, Rorschach, 1993, ISBN 3-905222-65-5.
