= Alter Rhein =

River in Switzerland

Coordinates: 47°28′11″N 9°36′36″E

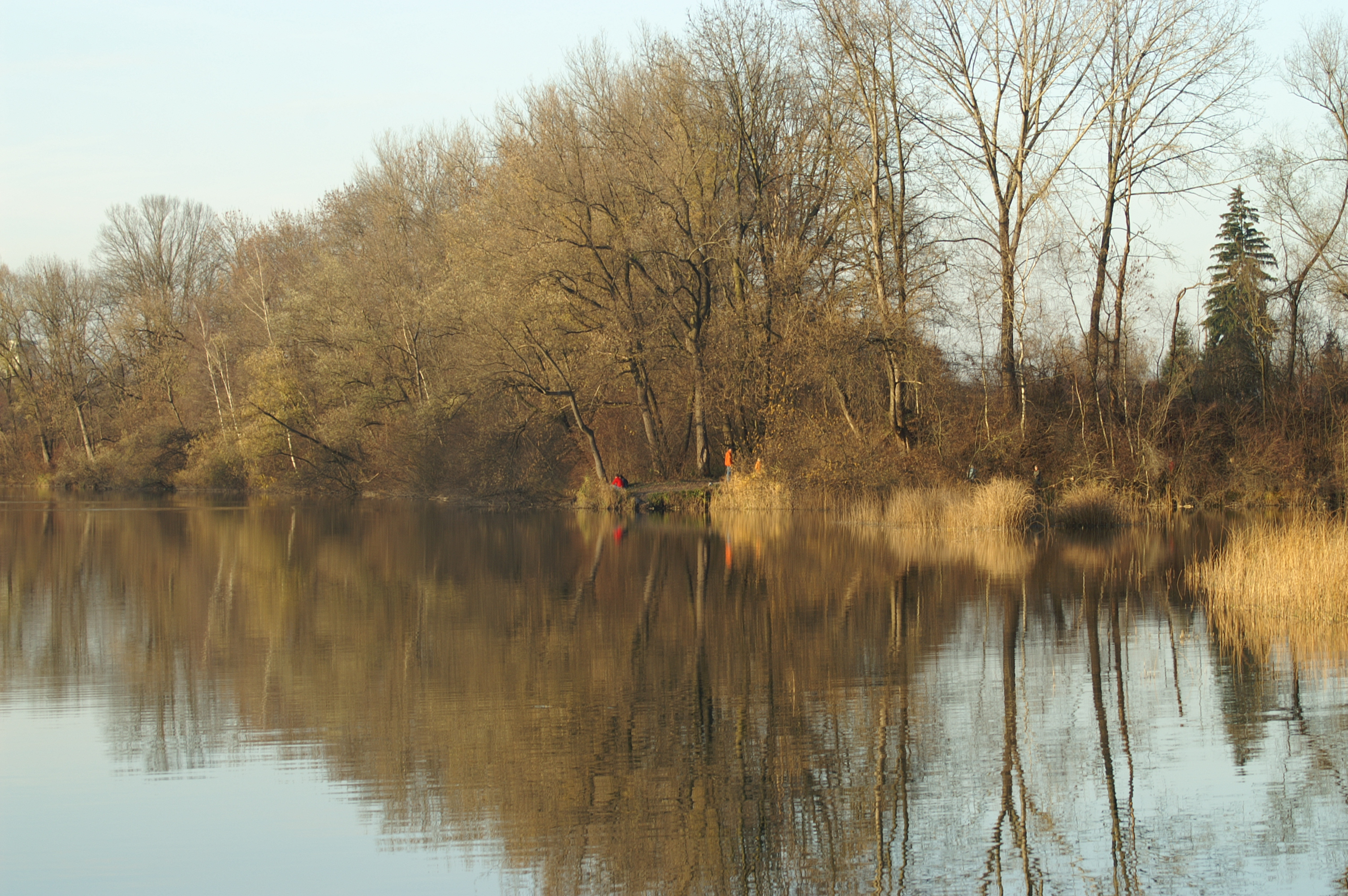

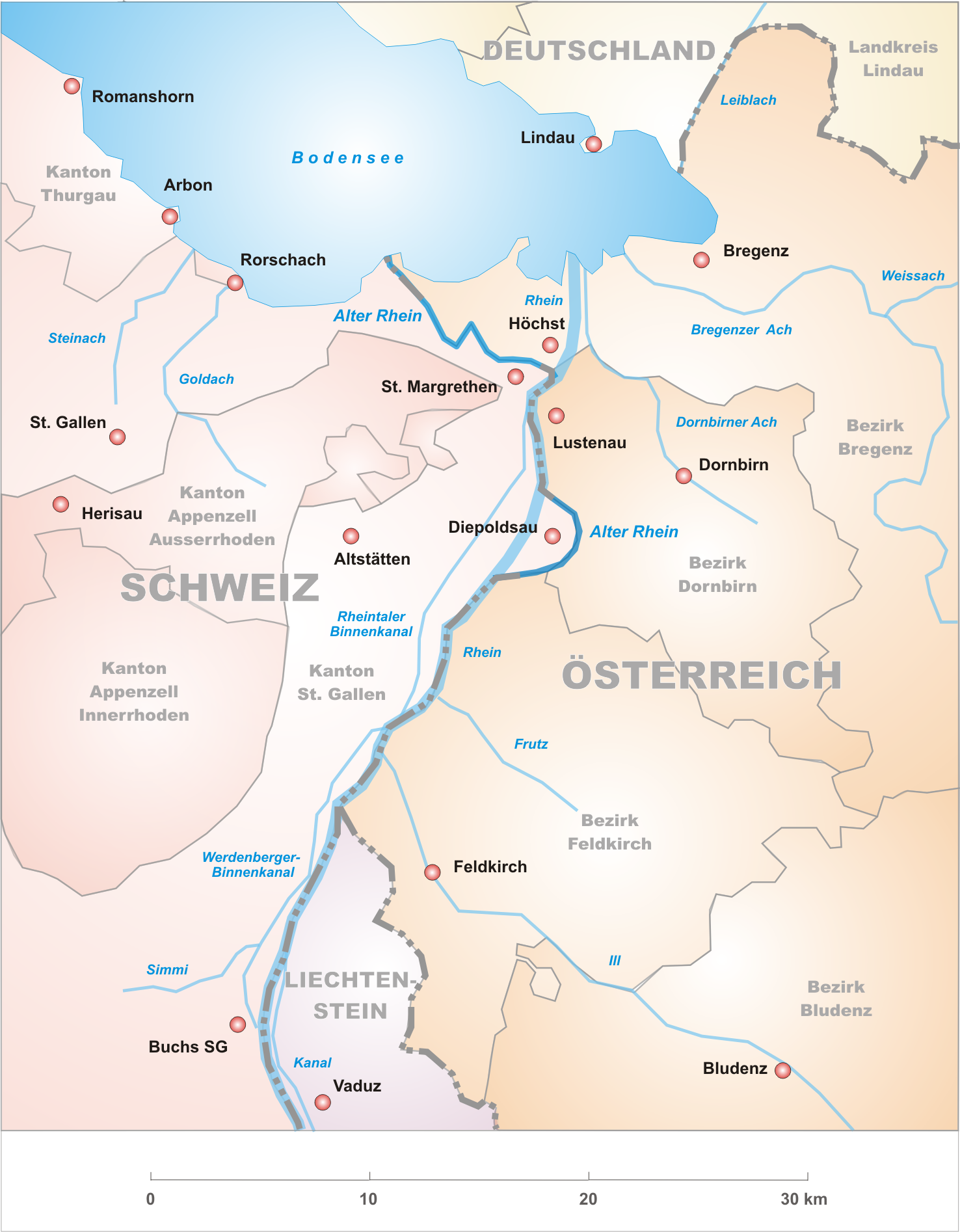
- The Alter Rhein

Location
- Countries: Austria and Switzerland

The Alter Rhein (pronounced [ˈaltɐ ˈʁaɪn]; German for 'Old Rhine') is the old river bed of the Alpine Rhine in St. Gallen and Vorarlberg in the Alpine Rhine Valley, which was cut off when the Rhine was straightened during the 20th century. These cut-off arms have become valuable recreational areas and a nature reserve.

In 1900, the short-cut at Fussach was completed, linking the natural course of the Rhine just upstream of Höchst and St. Margrethen directly to a new outflow into Lake Constance. The old river course downstream of this point, via Rheineck to Altenrhein on the shore of Lake Constance, became known as the Alter Rhein and continues to form the border between Austria and Switzerland. The arm is navigable from the lake to Rheineck, and is used by the Swiss shipping services (Schweizerische Bodensee-Schifffahrt) on the lake to reach landing stages adjacent to Rheineck railway station.

In 1906, the Rheintaler Binnenkanal ("Rhine Valley Inland Canal") was dug, connecting Sennwald to St. Margrethen. In 1923, another short-cut was completed at Diepoldsau, creating another dead branch, also named Alter Rhein.

For the straightening of the Alpine Rhine, the so-called Rhine Regulation, an industrial railway, the International Rhine Regulation Railway, was constructed on both sides of the river, the tracks of which still mostly exist today.

The area between the Old and New Rhine forms the nature reserve Rhine Delta (not to be confused with the Rhine Delta in the Netherlands).

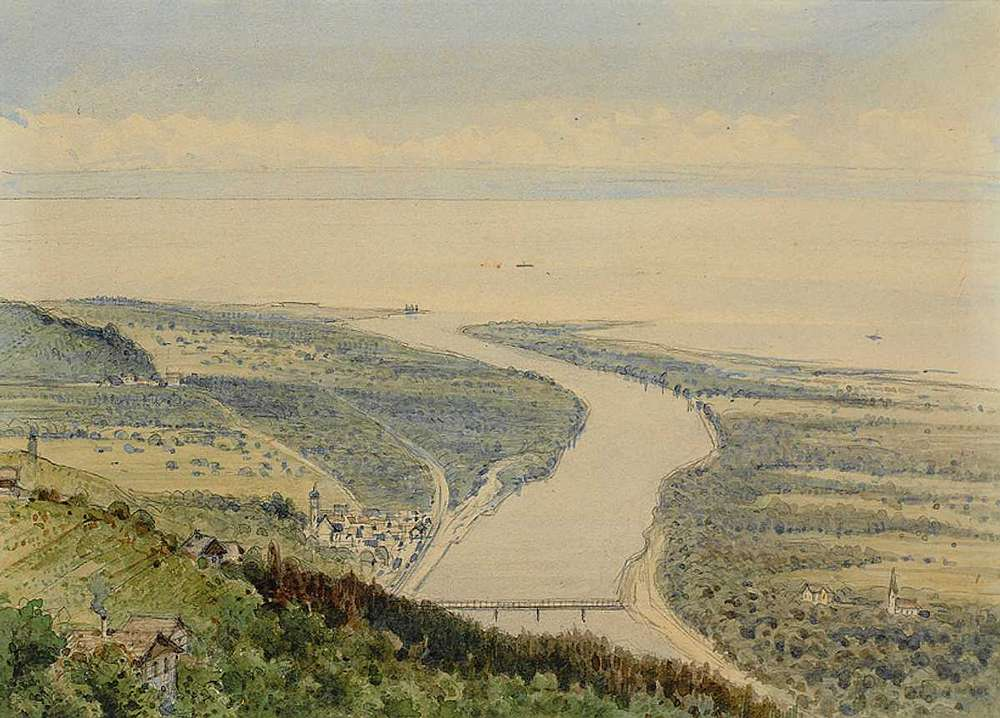
Painting by Max Bach (1841-1914) of the view of Rheineck and the former mouth of the Rhine into Lake Constance

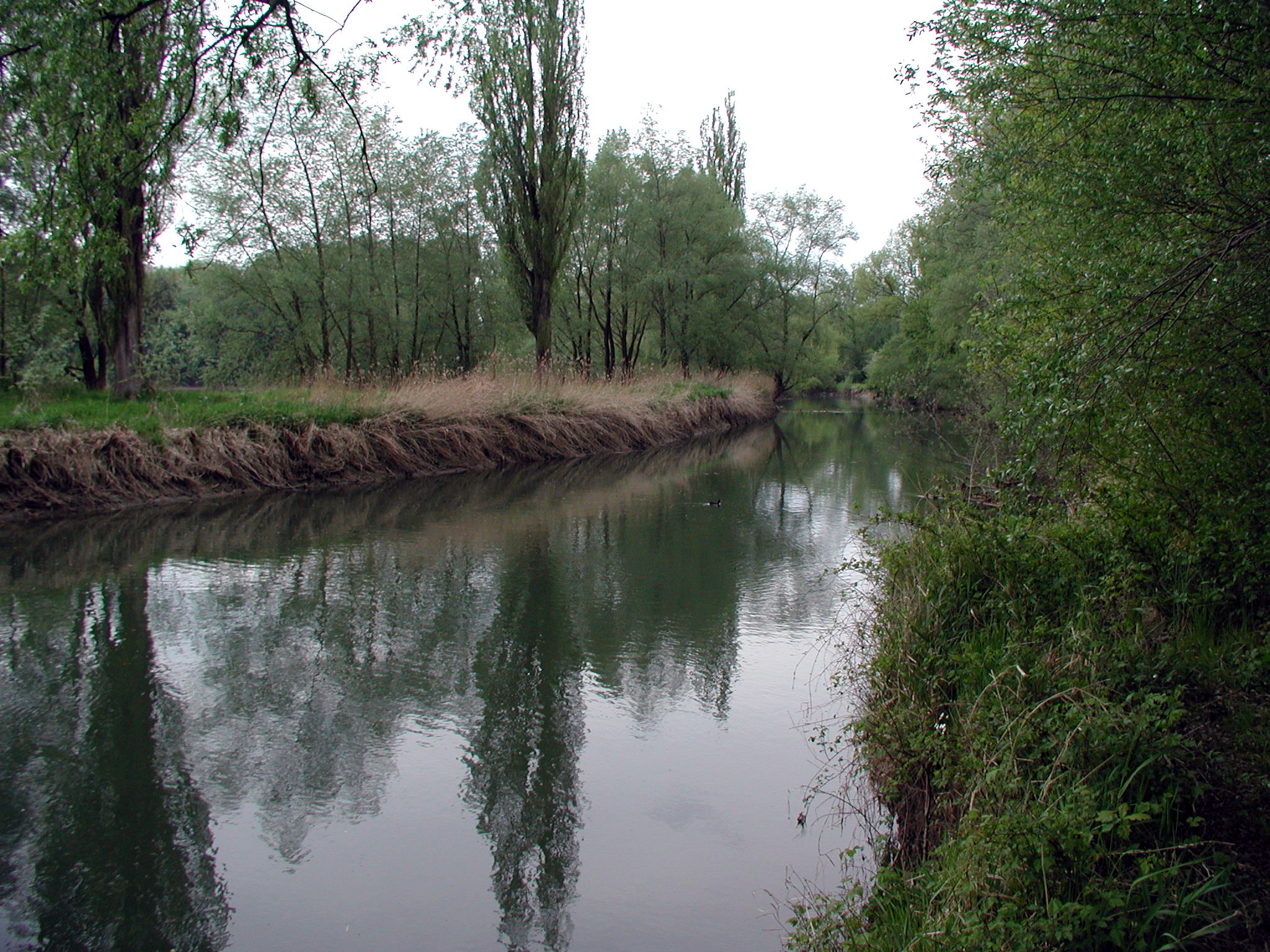
The Alter Rhein near Höchst

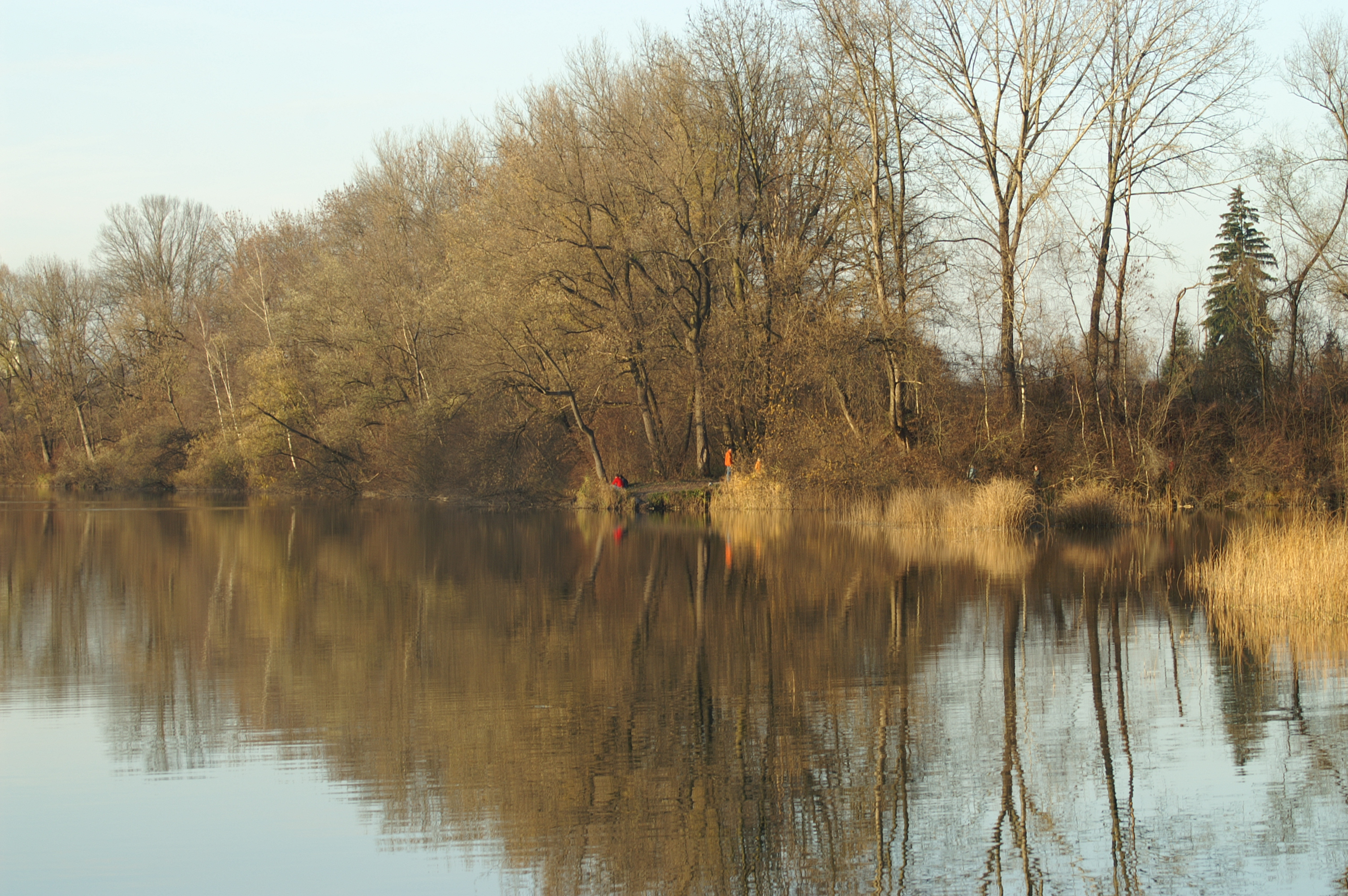
The Alter Rhein at Hohenems, on the border with Diepoldsau
