= International Rhine Regulation Railway =

Preserved industrial railway in Austria and Switzerland

Coordinates: 47.4478°N 9.6614°E

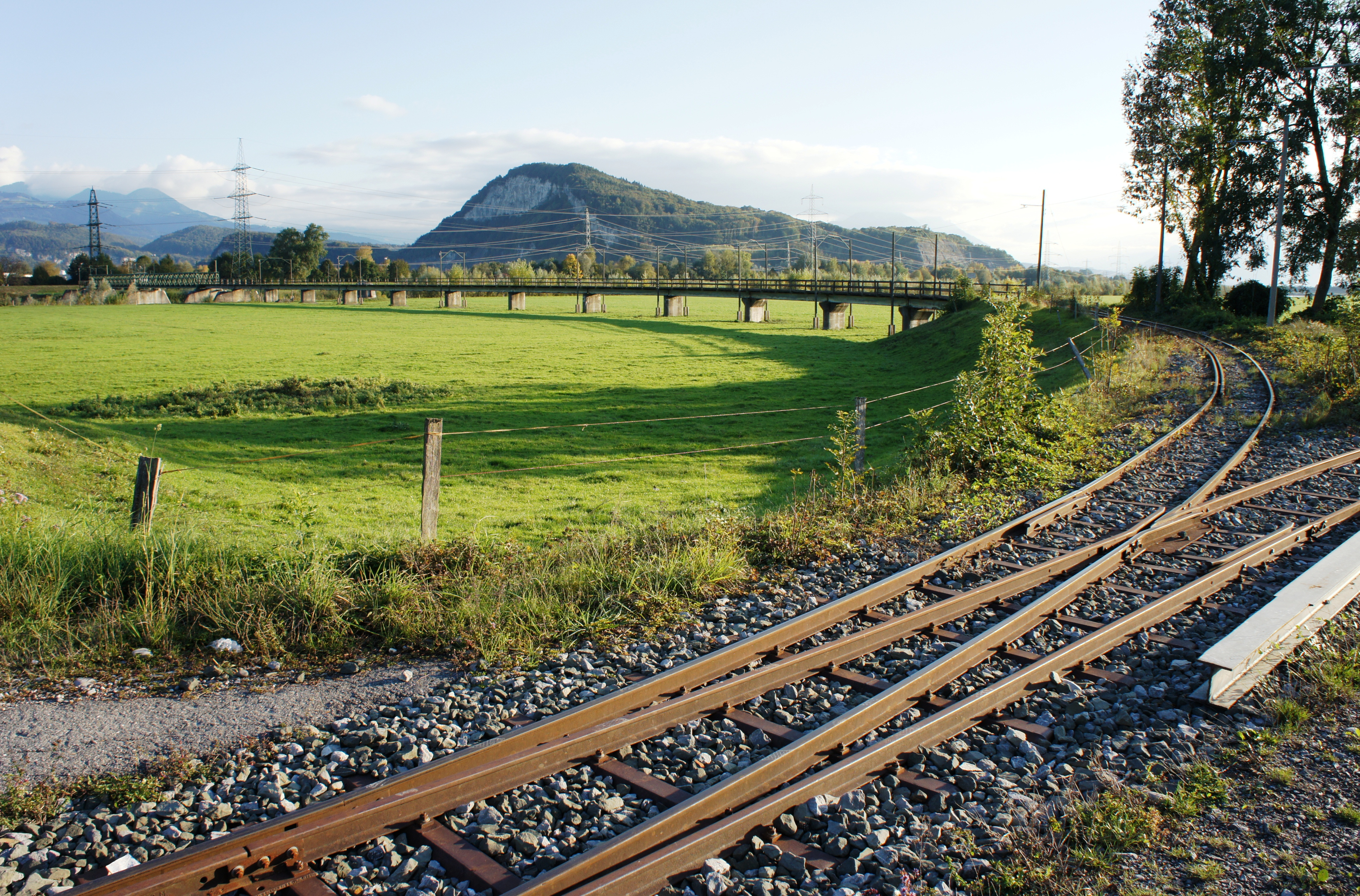
- The railway bridge at Kriessern in 2011, photographed from Switzerland with Austria in the background

Overview
- Locale: Austria, Province of Vorarlberg; Switzerland, Canton of St Gallen

Technical
- Line length: 25 km (16 mi)
- Track gauge: 750 mm (2 ft 5 1/2 in)
- Electrification: 750 V DC

The International Rhine Regulation Railway (German: Internationale Rheinregulierungsbahn) was an industrial railway situated on both banks of the Alpine Rhine canal to the south of its outfall into Lake Constance. As this stretch of the River Rhine forms the border between Austria and Switzerland, the railway is located in both countries (further north the border follows westwards along the Alter Rhein). Large parts of the system have been preserved, and part of the tracks are used as heritage railway.

== Infrastructure ==
The railway opened in 1892. It is constructed to 750 mm gauge (2 ft 5 1/2 in gauge) and is partially electrified at 750 V DC using overhead lines. As its name suggests, the railway's original purpose was to assist in the engineering works needed to regulate the Rhine in this area - the so-called Rhine Regulation. Rocks from nearby quarries were used to build and reinforce the levees along the river (today, transportation of rocks to the levees is done using trucks).

== Current use ==
In 2006, the then 33 km (21 mi) long line was closed for industrial use. Some of the tracks, mainly on the left bank of the river, have been subsequently removed, including the bridge at Kriessern in 2020. However, most of the line remains. Part of the tracks were converted to a heritage railway. Since 2008, operations on the line between Lustenau (where a small platform was built) and the river outflow are done by the Verein Rheinschauen (Rheinschauen association), which also conducts maintenance work on the line. Diesel-electric locomotives push-pulling passenger coaches operate on weekends during the warmer seasons.

== Gallery ==
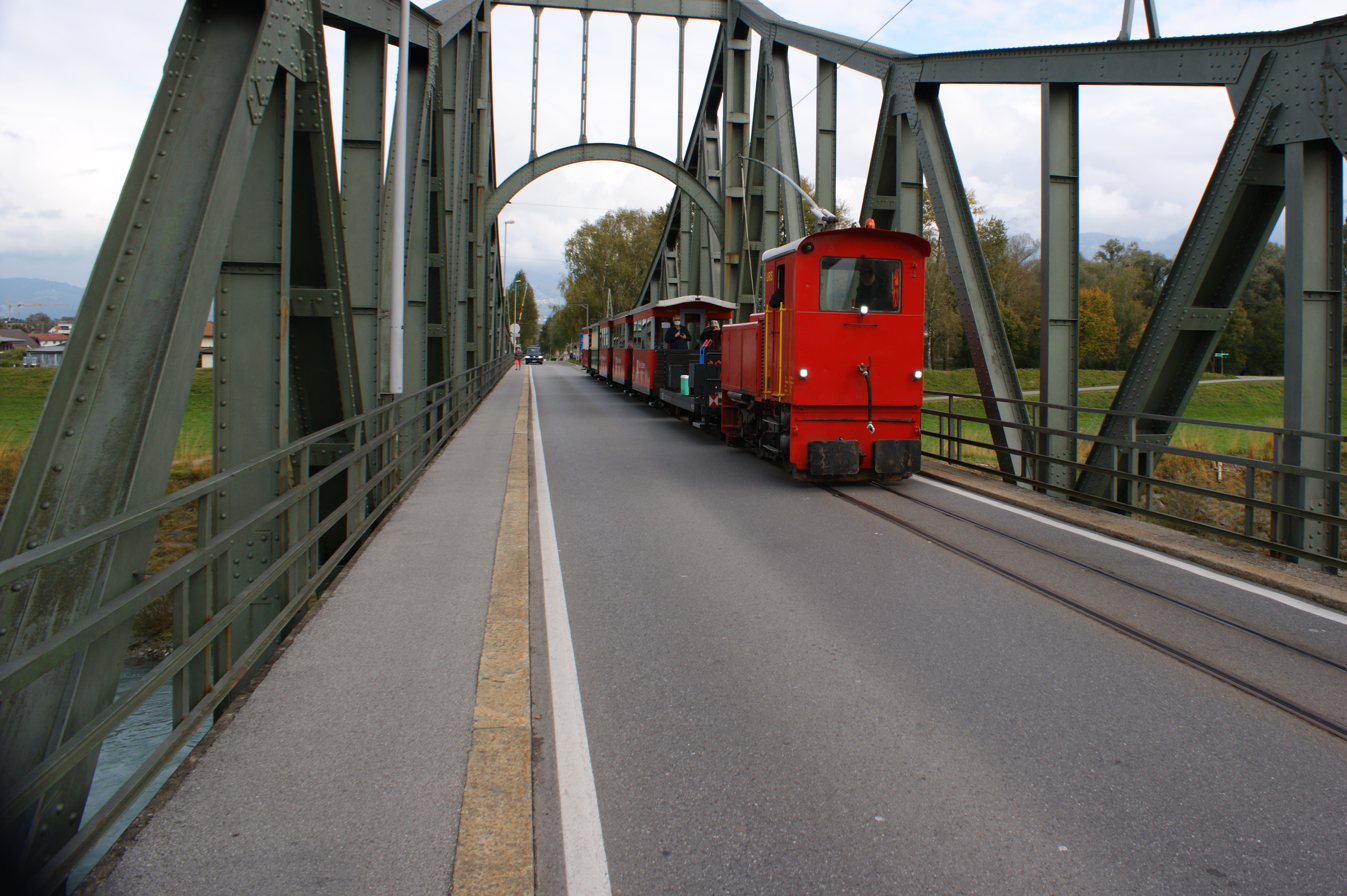
Heritage train on the Wiesenrain bridge over the Alpine Rhine

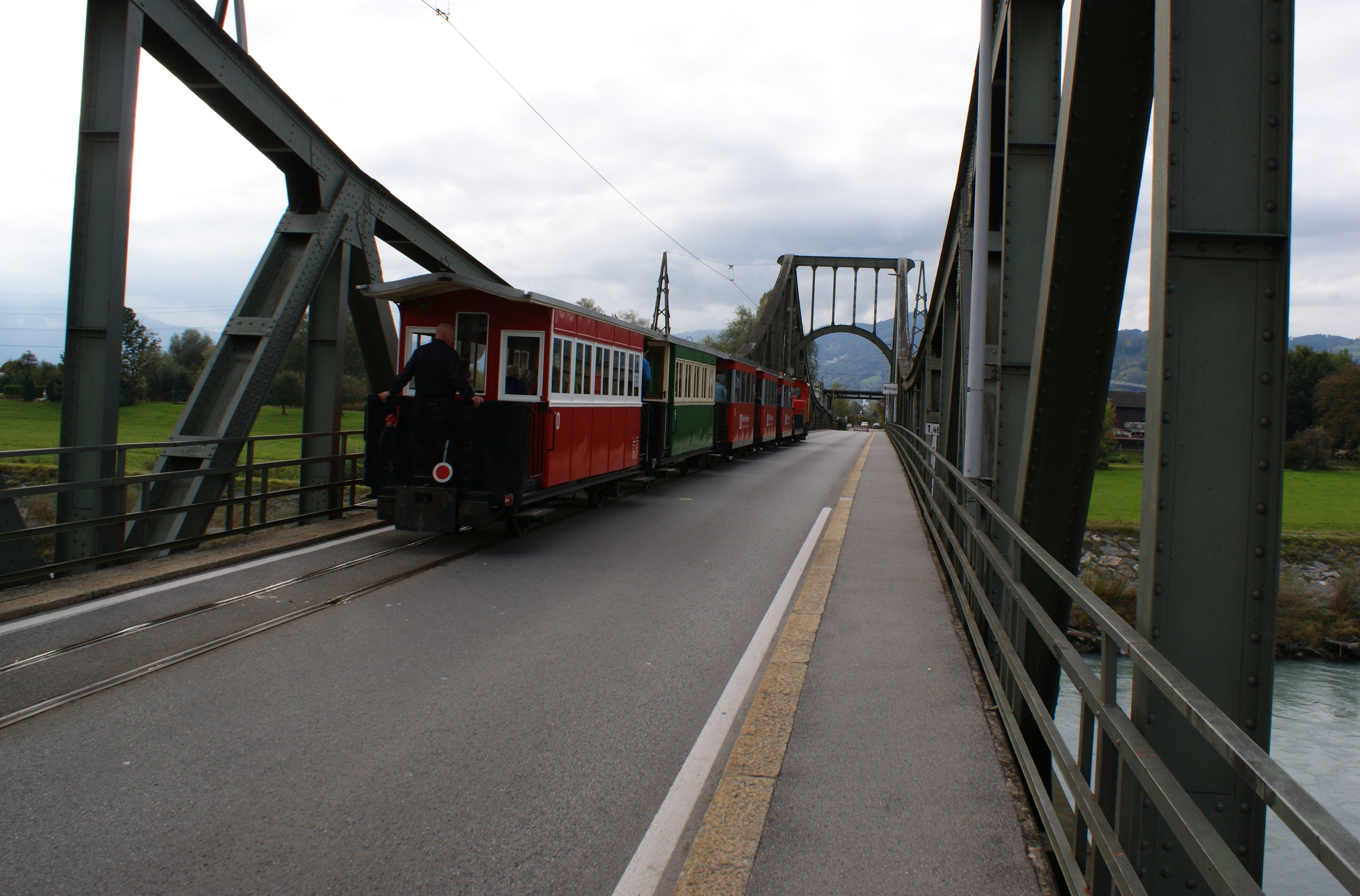
Heritage train on the Wiesenrain bridge over the Alpine Rhine

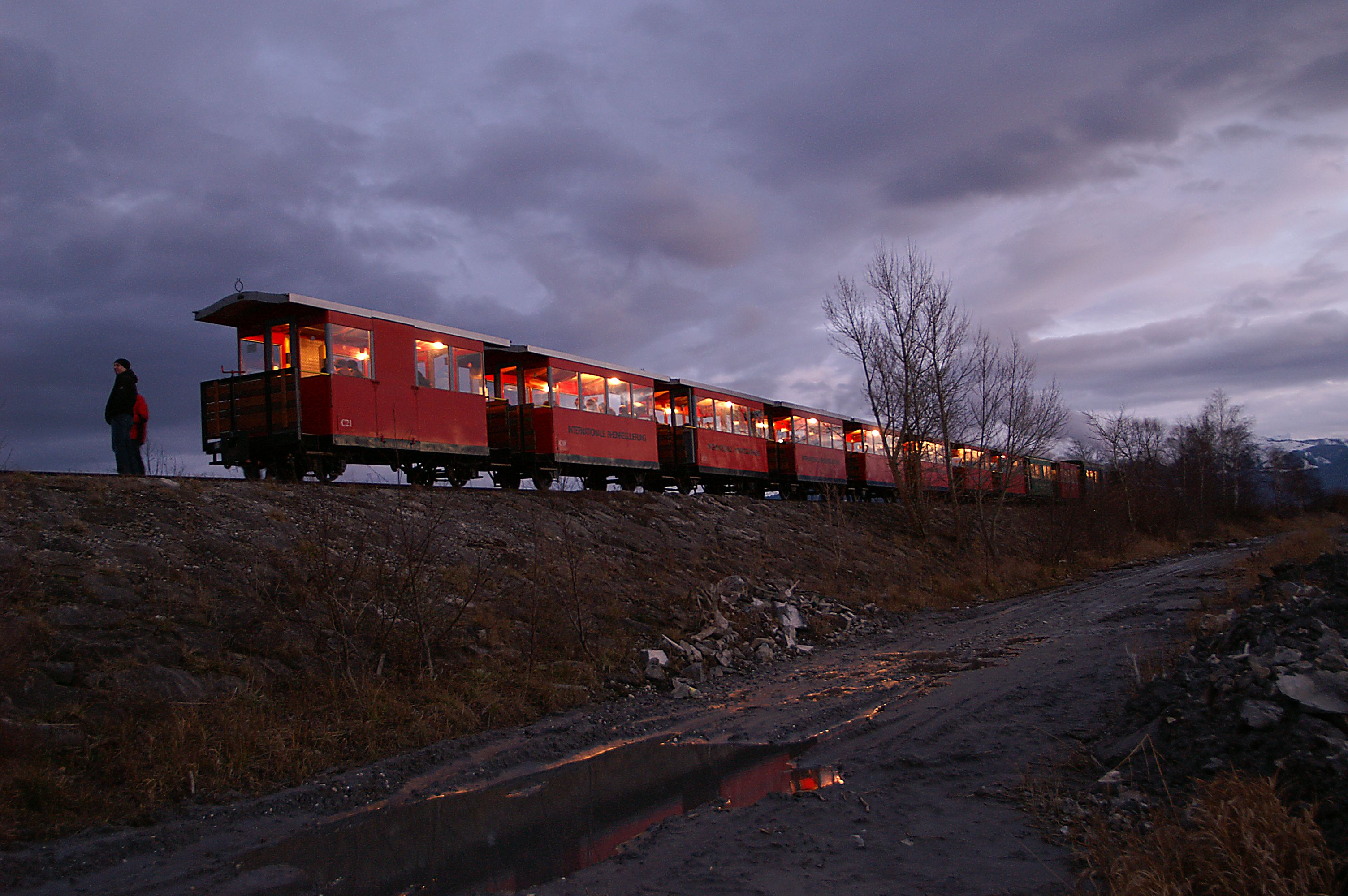
Heritage train "Nikolaus" in 2007

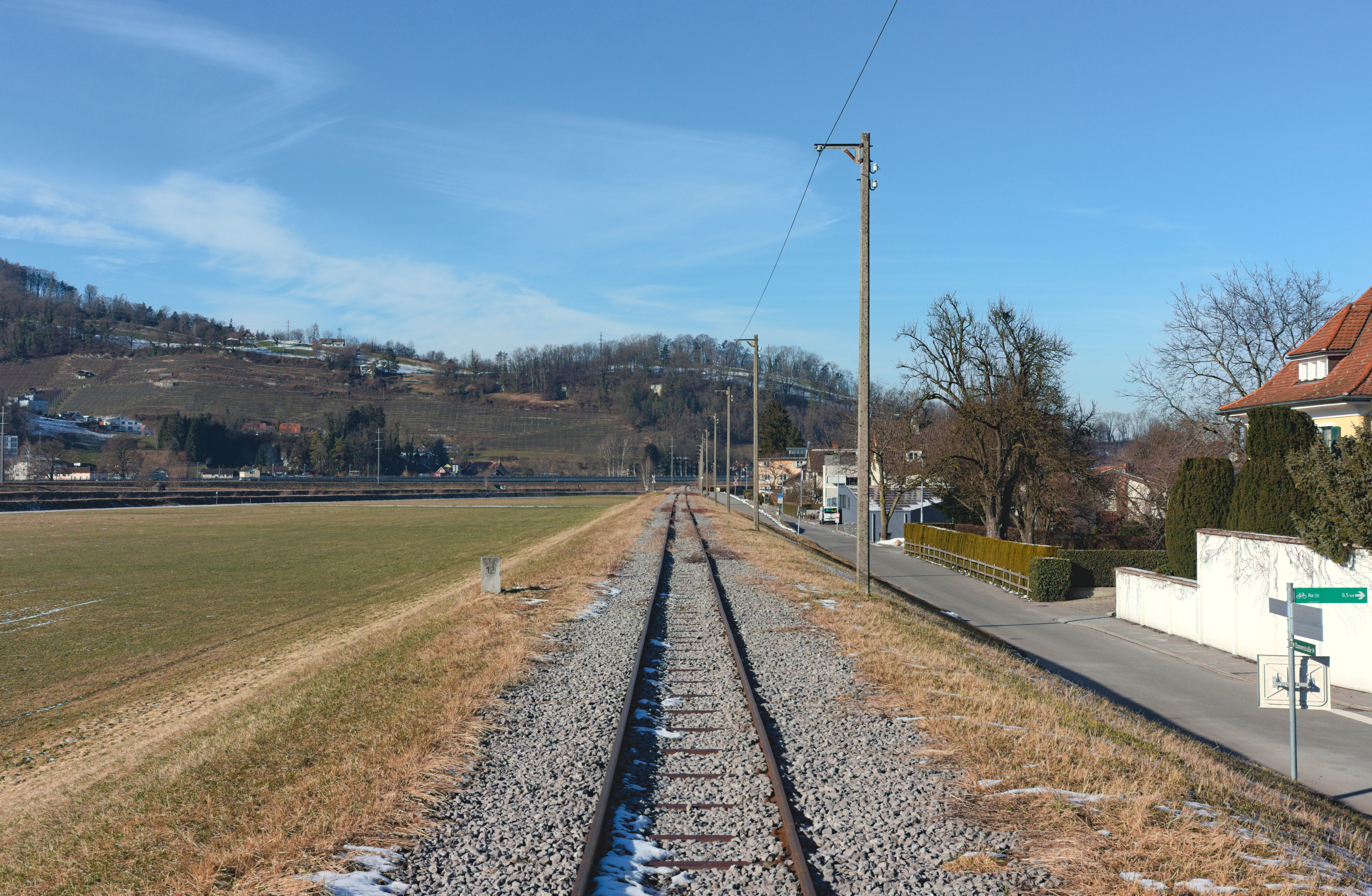
Tracks in Lustenau

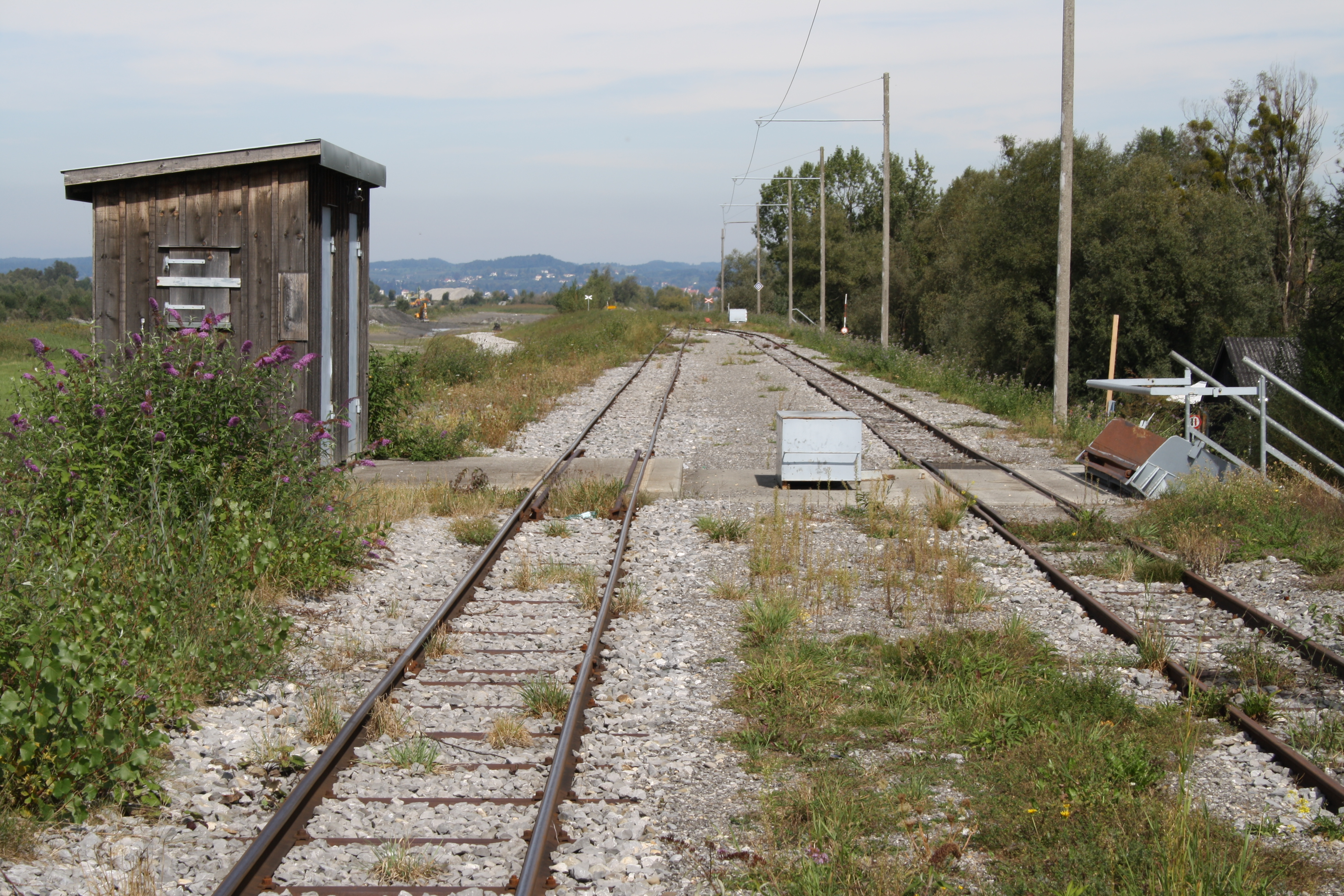
Route section near Hard in 2009

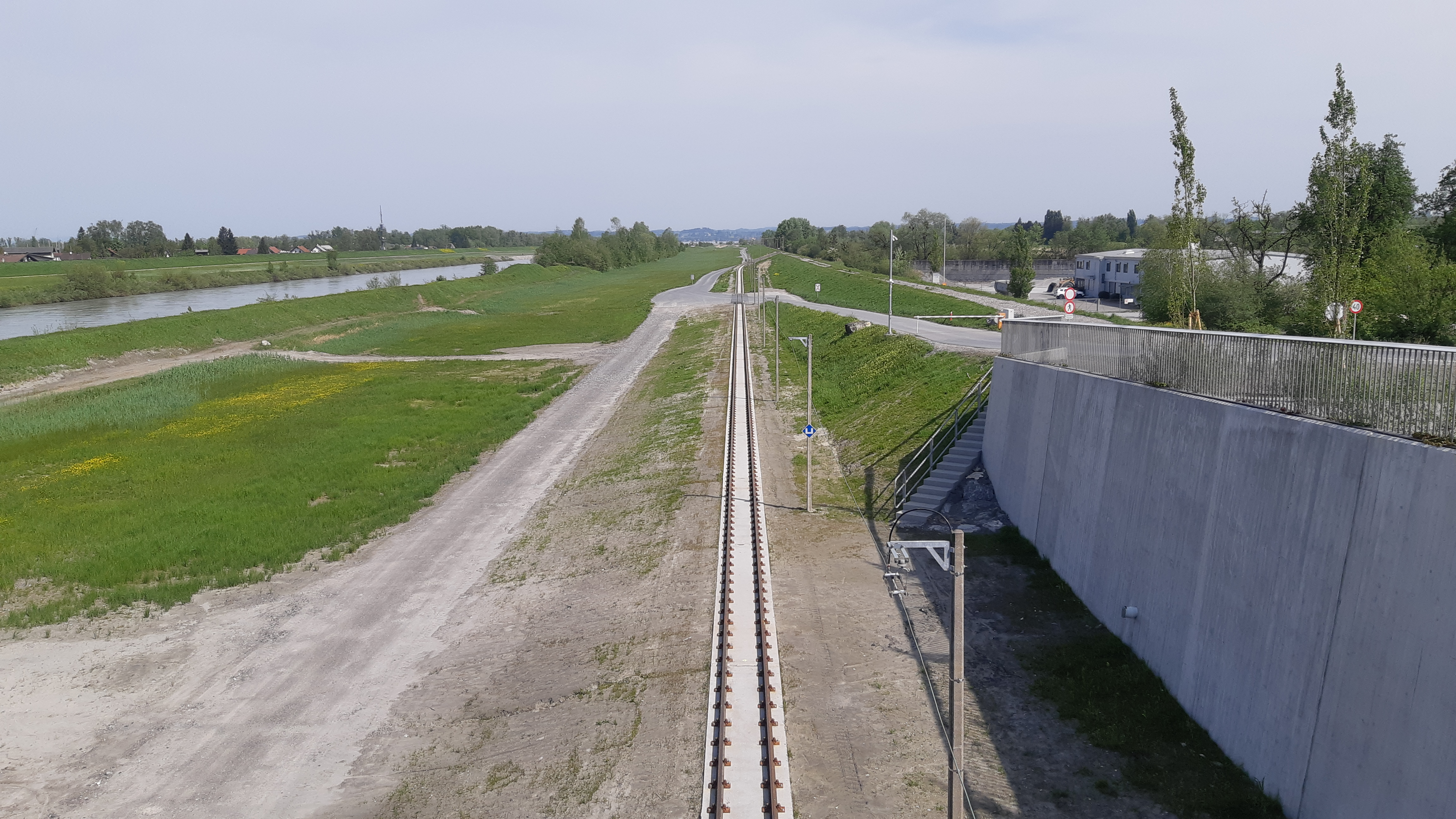
Tracks under Fussach-Hard bridge

== See also ==
- List of heritage railways and funiculars in Switzerland
