= Saar (Rhine) =

River in Switzerland

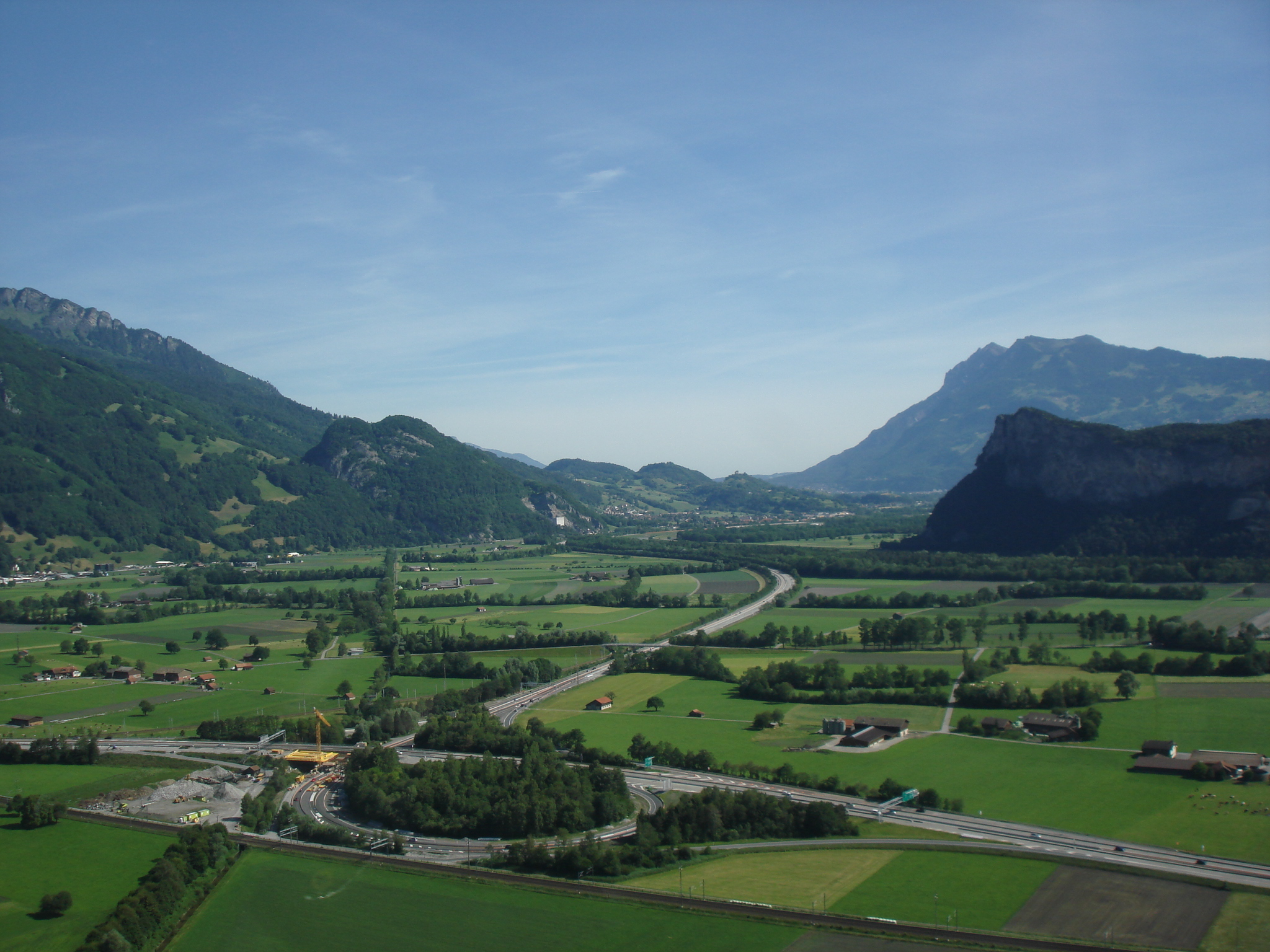
- The river runs to the left (west) of the on-ramp

Location
- Country: Switzerland

Physical characteristics
- Mouth: Rhine
  - coordinates: 47.0617°N 9.4634°E

Basin features
- Progression: Rhine→ North Sea

The Saar is a minor tributary of the Alpine Rhine in the Swiss canton of St. Gallen. It rises in Mittelsäss, Bad Ragaz municipality, at 2,087 m elevation. Flowing generally north, it passes the Saarfall waterfall, dropping from 560 m to 500 m, reaching the plain of the Rhine Valley. From here, it is strongly canalised, flowing through the territories of the Vilters-Wangs, Mels and Sargans municipalities before joining the Rhine downstream of Trübbach at 480 m.

Its named tributaries are Kleine Saar (left), Vadanabach (left) Saschielbach (right), Silbergiessen (right), Chrummgiessen (right) and Kaltgiessen (right).

The Saar was first canalised between 1855–1862. Its confluence with the Rhine was moved 700 metres downstream, to the mouth of the Trübbach. Its lower course was widened in 1899–1908. Its mouth was again moved downstream by 2.5 km after a flood in 1954.

== See also ==
- Seez (river)
- List of rivers of Switzerland
