= Rhine Delta (Lake Constance) =

River delta on the south-eastern shore of Lake Constance

Designations

Ramsar Wetland
- Official name: Rheindelta
- Designated: 16 December 1982
- Reference no.: 275

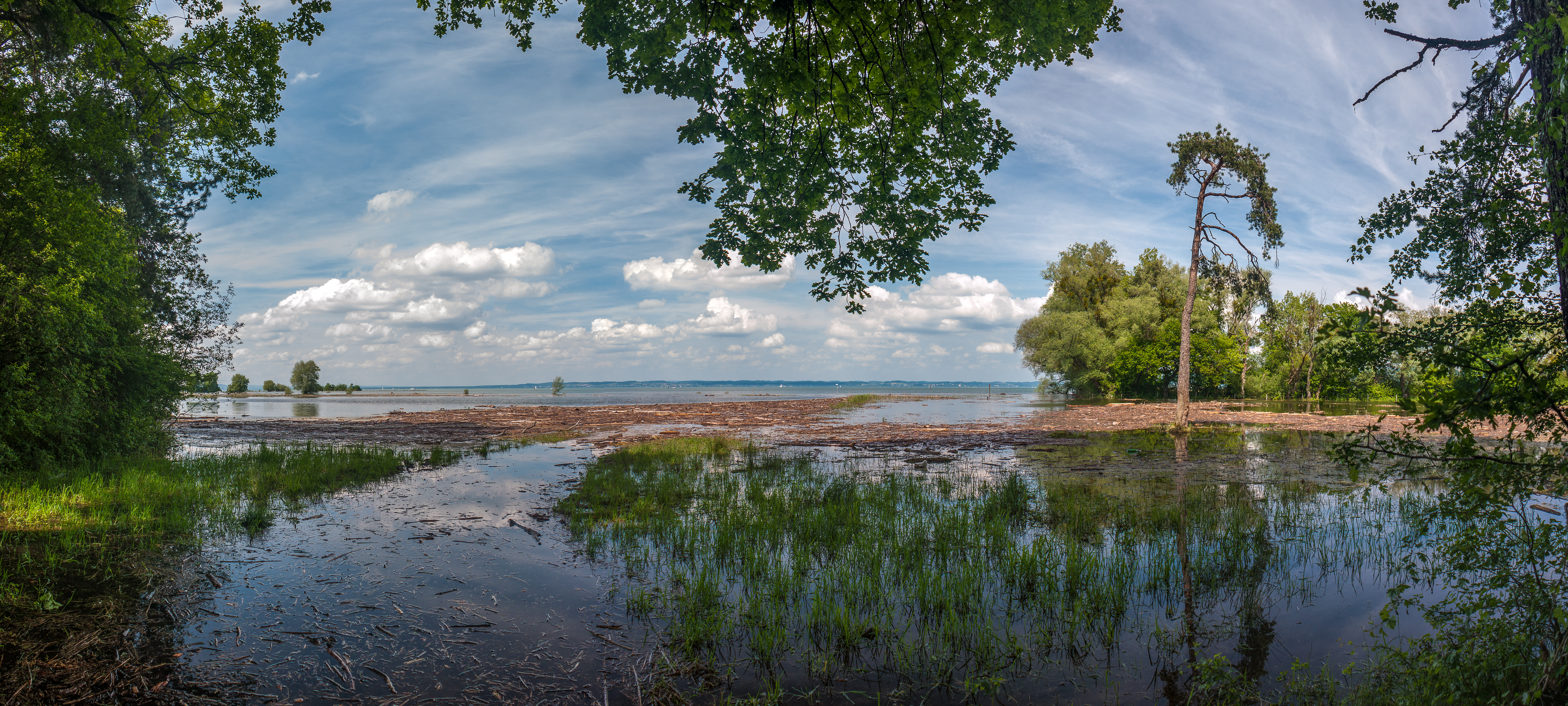
Rheinholz on river delta, flooded

The Rhine Delta of Lake Constance is the river delta on the south-eastern shore of Lake Constance, which the Rhine (also called Alpine Rhine (Alpenrhein)) has formed in a former sea area. It lies mostly in the Austrian province of Vorarlberg, smaller areas are in the Swiss canton of St. Gallen. The two peninsulas in the lake are called Rheinspitz (west) and Rohrspitz (east).

== Geography ==
The delta of the Alpine Rhine forms a common delta area with the eastern deltas of the rivers Dornbirner Ach and Bregenzer Ach. In the north, the border of the Rhine Delta runs along the shore of Lake Constance. The southern border depends on the course of Lake Constance after the melting of the Rhine glacier. It is usually at least a few kilometers long. The Rhine culvert between Lustenau and Fußach, which was created at the beginning of the 20th century, is not an original delta arm and its lower section runs through the area of the historic Dornbirn-Ach Delta. Nevertheless, since then the main delta formation has been at the mouth of the Rhine culvert between Fußach and Hard, and no longer at the former main mouth of what is now the Old Rhine. Like the Rhine at Lustenau, the Old Rhine nestles close to the western slope of the Rhine valley and forms the national border between Austria and Switzerland. The alluvial forest on the Austrian side of the Rheinspitz on the Old Rhine is known as Rheinholz.

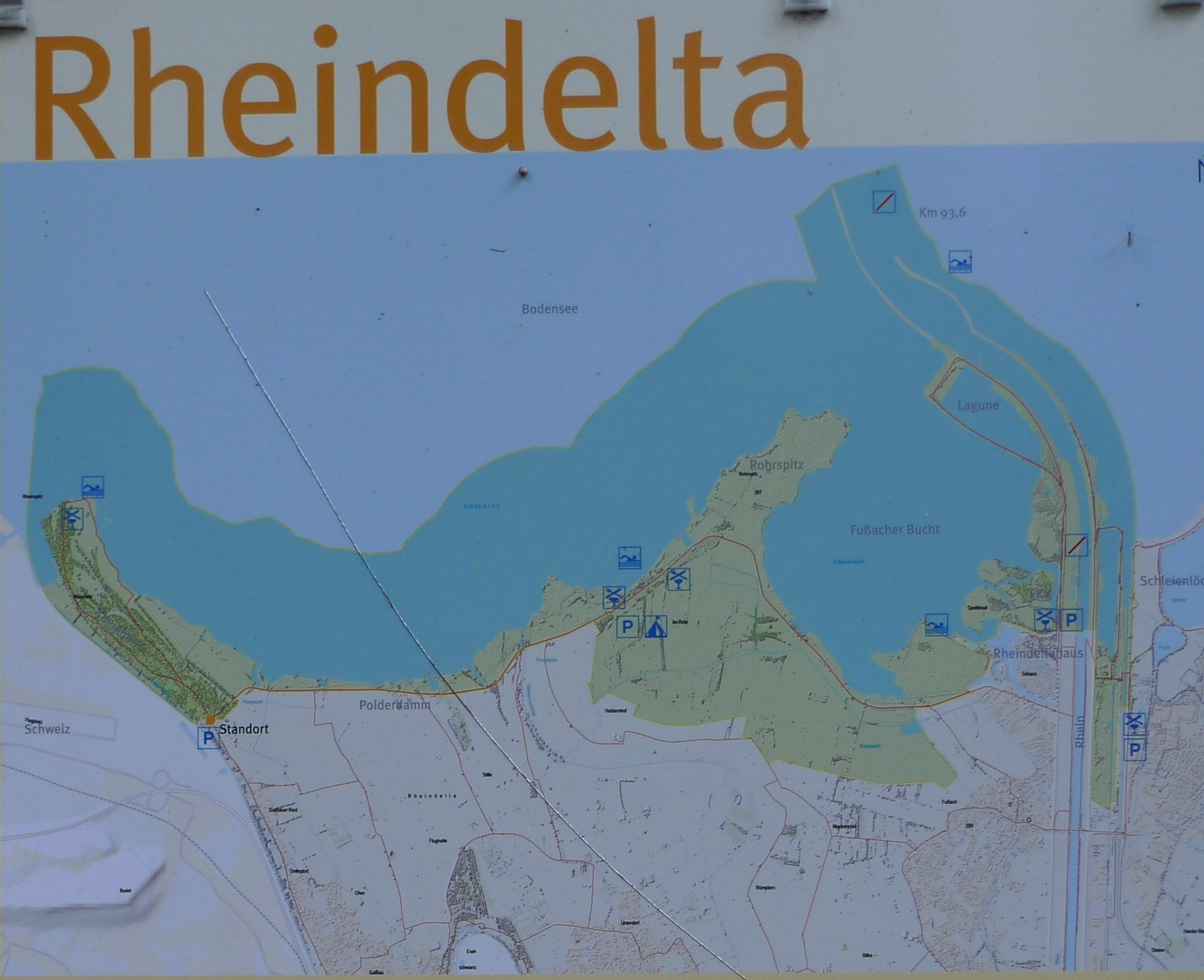
Geographical overview of the Rhine Delta

The area covers an area of 2,065 hectares, of which 1,960 hectares are on Austrian territory. About two thirds of the Rhine Delta consists of water (1,300 hectares), which generally has a depth of just a few meters.

== History ==
Following the retreat of the Rhine glacier after the last glacial period, Lake Constance formed, which originally extended further south in the Rhine valley. At the same time, the formation of the delta began at the mouth of the Alpine Rhine. This process continues to this day and is part of a process that would conclude in several thousand years with the complete silting up of Lake Constance.

== Nature park ==
The Rhine Delta is the largest wetland biotope reserve on Lake Constance and extends from the mouth of the Alter Rhein over the mouth of the Neuer Rhein to the Dornbirner Ach in Hard (Vorarlberg). Both Austria and Switzerland have each designated the area as a nature reserve.

Due to its great ecological importance, the Vorarlberg area of the Rhine Delta is a wetland of international importance (a so-called Ramsar site). Since 1995, the nature reserve is part of the Natura 2000 network focusing on fauna-flora habitat and bird protection.

== The polder dam ==
The construction of the polder dam (1956–1963), the lowering of the water level by the pumping stations, and the clearing of the floodplain and swamp forests made it possible to use the land around the lake more intensively for agriculture. Supporters of the damming of the lake saw this as the "conquest of a considerable granary", while environmentalists soon pointed to the negative consequences of the altered groundwater balance and demanded that part of the wet meadows be placed under nature protection in order to preserve the diversity of flora and fauna.

In 1963, the magazine "Schweizer Naturschutz" reported in an article entitled "Das Rheindelta vor dem Untergang" (The Rhine Delta on the verge of extinction) that "the area richest in birds in Central Europe has already been partially destroyed and will soon be condemned to total extinction if it is not possible to protect at least parts of it". One year later, WWF International decided to include the Rhine Delta in its programme of activities as a project of particular urgency.

The Austrian Institute for Nature Conservation and Landscape Management was also critical in a 1971 letter: "... according to the unanimous opinion of domestic and foreign nature conservation experts, the Vorarlberg Rhine Delta [is] one of the most valuable and at the same time most worthy of protection in Europe. The government of Vorarlberg should therefore immediately stop the work on lowering the groundwater level and do everything in its power to achieve effective protection of the area as soon as possible".

=== Fauna and flora ===
==== Fauna ====
The variety of birds inhabiting the nature park contributes significantly to this ecological importance. To date, well over 300 bird species have been observed which makes the Rhine Delta nature park popular among ornithologists and bird watchers. Shallow water and silt areas are important resting and breeding places as well as food spots for water birds and waders. Numerous rare and endangered species breed in the about 2,000 hectares of wet meadows, reed beds and riparian forests.

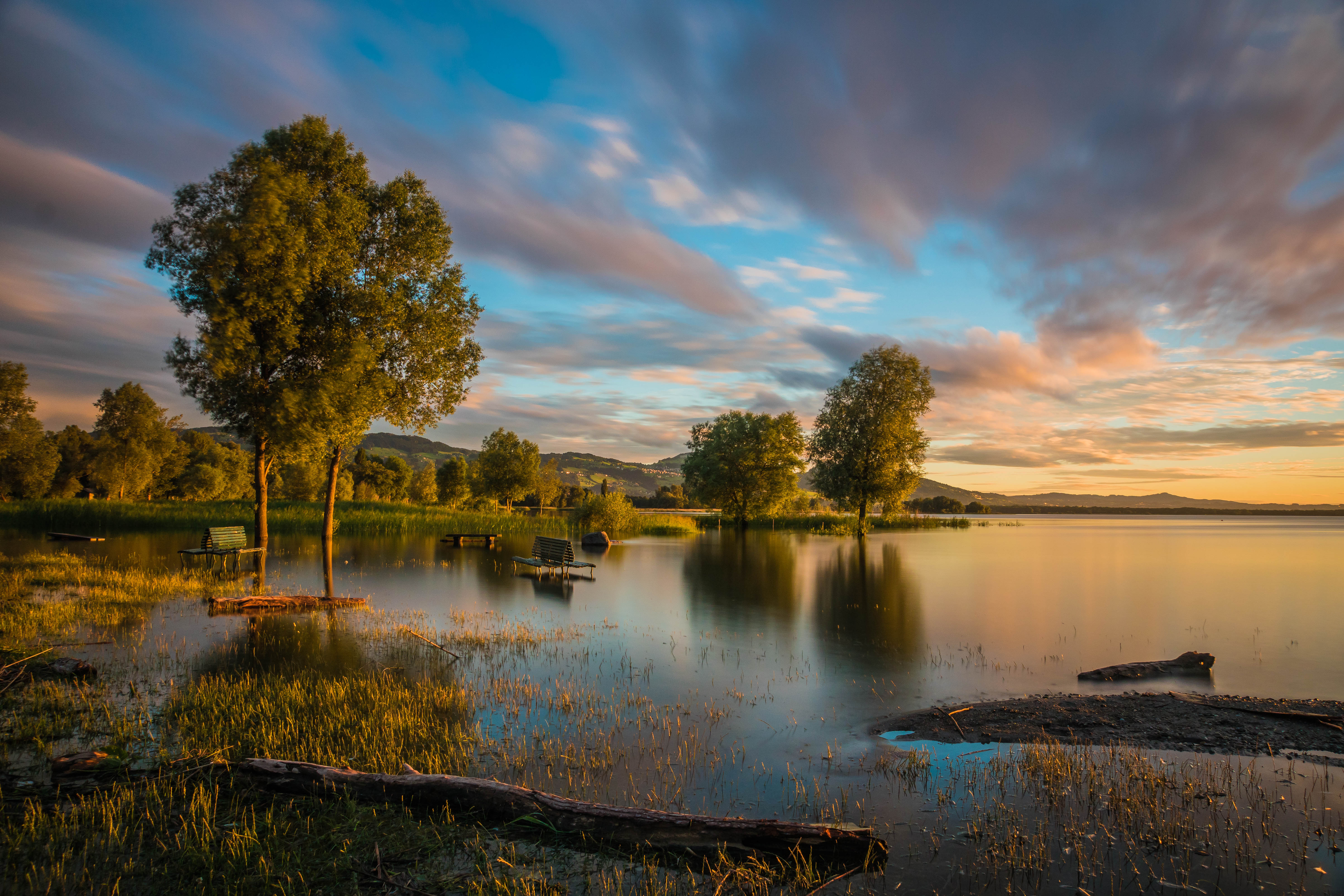
Peninsula Rohrspitz on Lake Constance

The Rhine Delta is an ideal habitat for many amphibians, too. So far, nine species and a hybrid form (the edible frog) have been identified in this area. The large populations of water frogs are remarkable. European tree frogs and crested newts are also found locally in considerable numbers. Moreover, five native reptile species live in the area. In 2006, the wall lizard was first detected at the mouth of the Rhine. The wall lizard is a heat-loving lizard species with a distribution focus in the Mediterranean. It is likely to have settled in Vorarlberg after having been exposed by humans.

Although primarily known for its bird life, the Rhine Delta is also an important habitat for mammals, especially for small mammals. The crowned shrew and the greater white-toothed shrew, among others, are found in the area and are restricted to the Alpine Rhine valley in Austria. So far, four bat species have been reliably detected. The beaver was eradicated in Vorarlberg in 1686 due to its fur and usage as a fasting meal. In 2006, beaver traces were discovered at the Old Rhine for the first time in over 300 years. In the meantime, the beaver has spread further and has already populated several bodies of water in the Rhine valley.

==== Flora ====
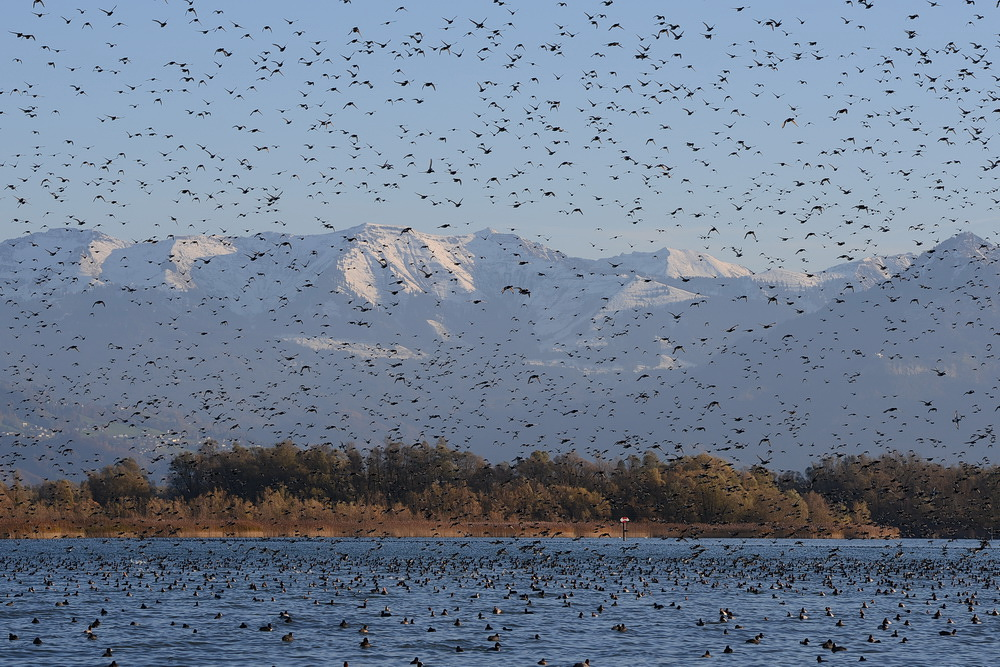
Water birds at the Fußacher bay

Although the land area comprises only about a third of the over 2000 hectare nature reserve, the Rhine Delta offers habitat for numerous plant species. Riparian forests, scattered meadows, reed beds and grass beds are the most ecologically valuable rural habitats. Large flat water zones and special locations such as dams and ruderal areas increase biodiversity.

So far, around 600 flowering plants and ferns have been detected, with several species in all of Austria or in Central Europe under threat. 33 species of the area are considered lost or have become extinct. These include, for example, the waterwheel plant, a carnivorous aquatic plant, the rarity of which once led Ferdinand I of Bulgaria to the Rhine Delta several times. The decline in species is primarily caused by drainage, intensified land use and river engineering. However, there is also a number of new species in the flora of the Rhine Delta, especially from America and Asia, that mainly inhabits artificial locations such as the Rhine dams.

== Tourism ==
=== Das Rheindeltahaus ("the Rhine Delta house") ===
The Rheindeltahaus is the service point and conservation station of the nature reserve. Visitors can gather information about guided excursions. It is a space for research, administrative work as well as public outreach work. Additionally, there are changing exhibitions about the Rhine Delta.

The fir timber house was designed by the architecture firm HK Architekten, which are known for their wood-based public buildings across Vorarlberg. The Rheindeltahaus was completed in 1998. Taking into consideration the flood levels of its location in Fußach, the house is built on stilts. Due to a photovoltaic system and a heat recovery system, the house is a low-energy construction.

=== Cycling ===
The Rhine Delta cycle route is suitable for both sporty and leisurely cyclists. The route is about 47,4 km long and has only little ascent. Along the way on the Old Rhine and on the shores of Lake Constance, there is a variety of swimming spots.

=== Lagoon circular walk ===
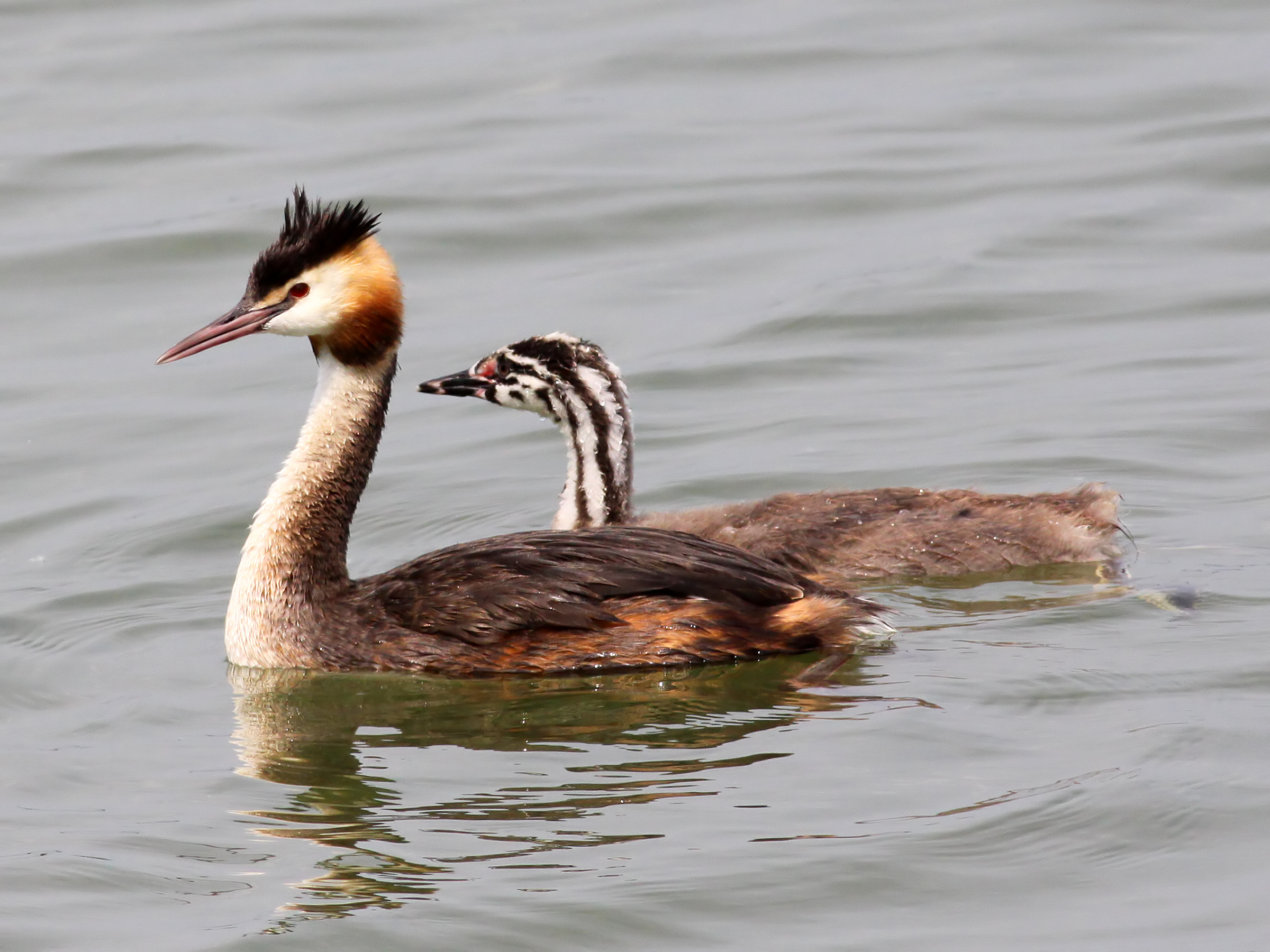
Great crested grebe in the Rhine delta

The lagoon tour in the Rhine Delta along the dam offers a view onto Lake Constance, and in particular onto the Lindau island.

- Route: Rhine estuary – Fußach – In der Schanz – Lagoon – In der Schanz
- Distance: 4,7 km
- Duration: About 1,5 hours

=== Bird-watching ===
With more than 340 recorded species (until 2002), the Rhine delta is a popular nature park among bird watchers. It is a well-known area for spotting rarities, especially waders. Since 1982, it is an Important Bird Area.

The BirdsClub-App, an app created for the Rhine area, will help bird watchers identify the birds sighted.

== See also ==
- Alpine Rhine
- Lake Constance
- Nature parks in Switzerland
