= Höchst, Austria =

Höchst
- Municipality
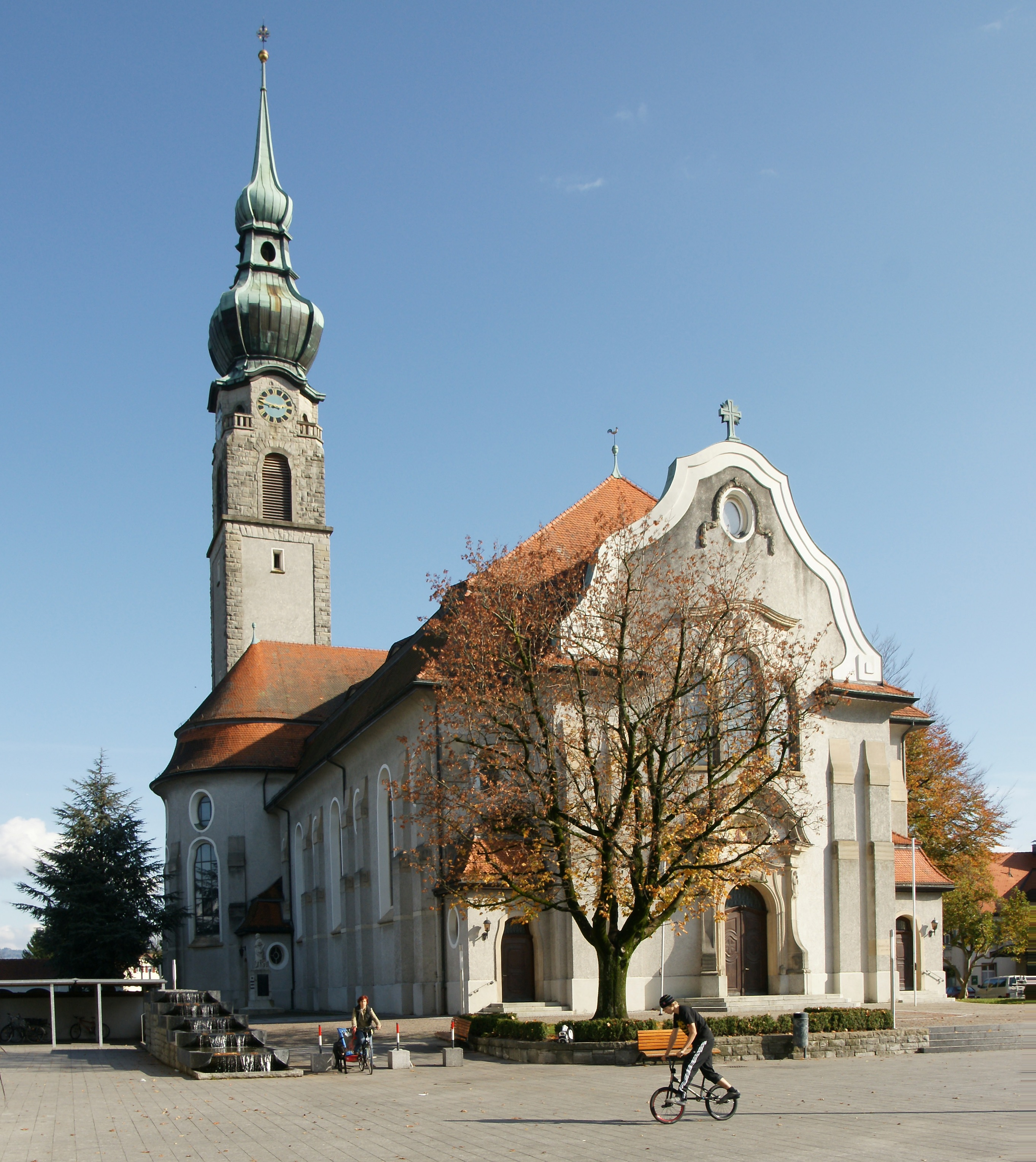

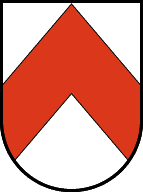
- Coat of arms

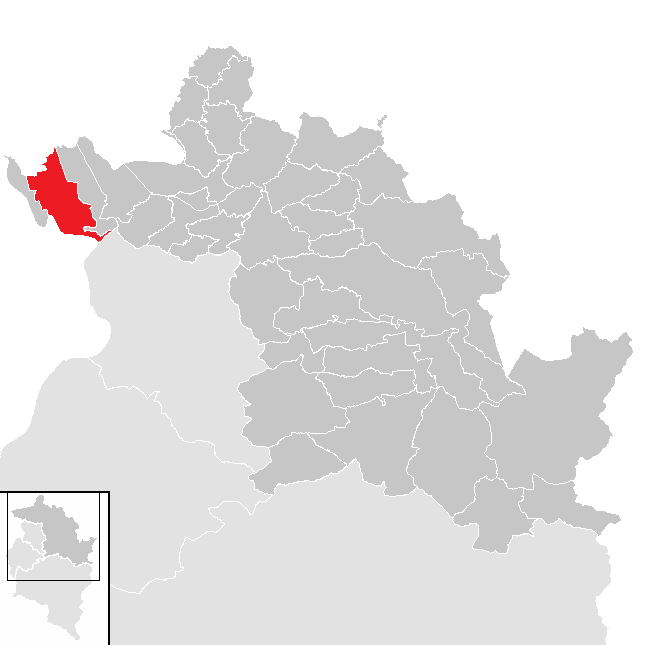
- Location in the district

- Location within Austria Location with Vorarlberg
- Coordinates: 47°27′16″N 09°38′27″E
- Country: Austria
- State: Vorarlberg
- District: Bregenz

Government
  - Mayor: Stefan Übelhör

Area
  - Total: 20.16 km^{2} (7.78 sq mi)
- Elevation: 403 m (1,322 ft)

Population (2026-01-01)
  - Total: 8,591
  - Density: 426.1/km^{2} (1,104/sq mi)
- Time zone: UTC+1 (CET)
  - Summer (DST): UTC+2 (CEST)
- Postal code: 6973
- Area code: 05578
- Vehicle registration: B
- Website: www.hoechst.at

Höchst (German pronunciation: [ˈhøːkst]) is a municipality in the district of Bregenz in the Austrian state of Vorarlberg.

== Population ==
Historical population
Year	Pop.	±%
1869	1,982	—
1880	1,990	+0.4%
1890	2,011	+1.1%
1900	2,093	+4.1%
1910	2,356	+12.6%
1923	2,350	−0.3%
1934	2,399	+2.1%
1939	2,486	+3.6%
1951	2,740	+10.2%
1961	3,391	+23.8%
1971	5,041	+48.7%
1981	5,893	+16.9%
1991	6,423	+9.0%
2001	7,096	+10.5%
2011	7,777	+9.6%
