= Frutz =

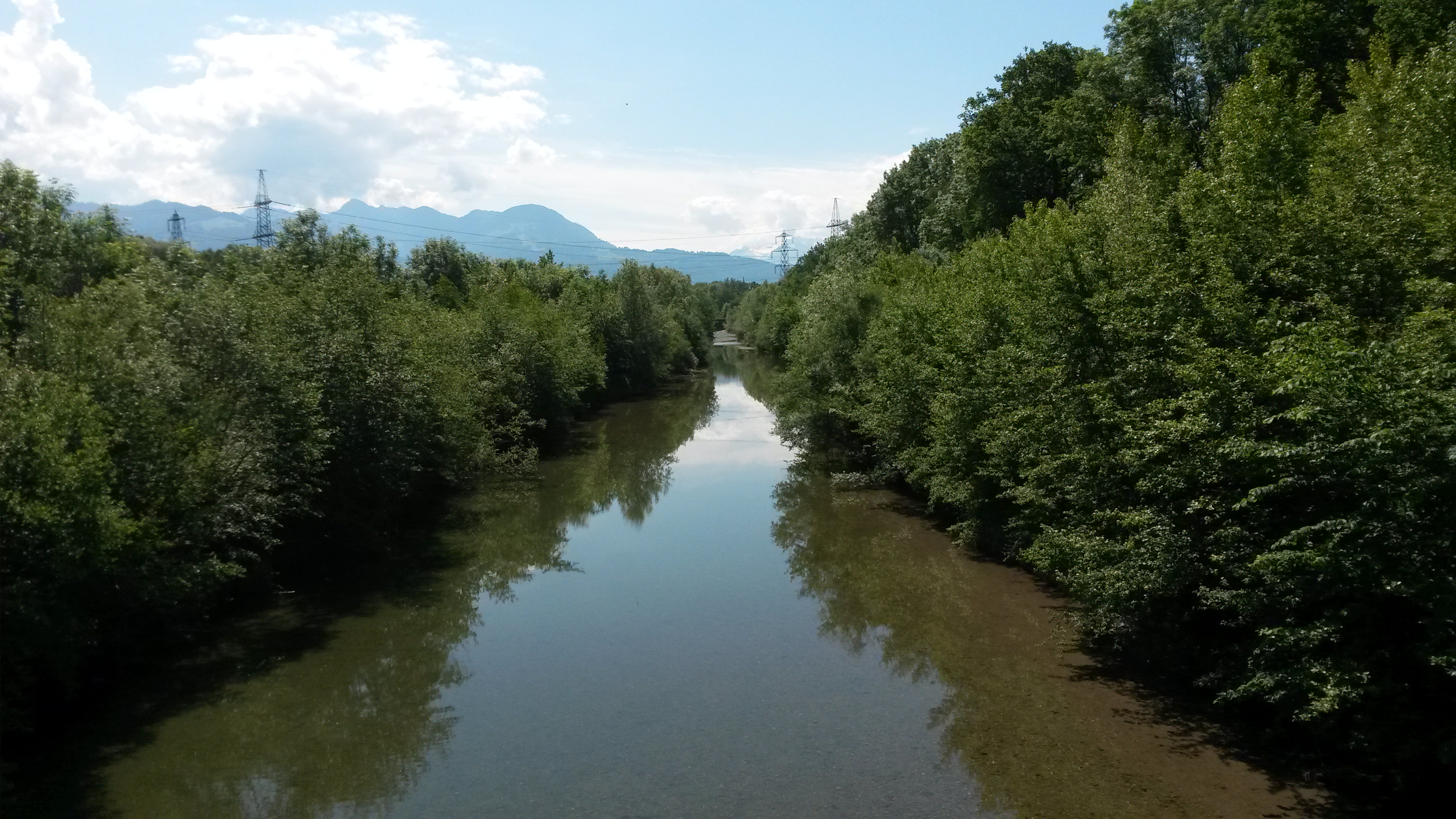
- River Frutz shortly before the confluence with the Rhine (photographed from the bicycle bridge)

Location
- Country: Austria
- State: Vorarlberg

Physical characteristics
- Source
  - location: Frutz Alpine shieling
  - elevation: 1,800 m (5,900 ft)
- Mouth
  - location: Rhine
  - coordinates: 47°19′03″N 9°35′21″E
- Length: ~ 19 km (12 mi)

Basin features
- Progression: Rhine→ North Sea

The Frutz is a river of Vorarlberg, Austria, a tributary of the Rhine.

The Frutz is 19 km (12 mi) long. Its source is in the Frutz Alpine shieling. It flows in a western direction through the valley Laternsertal in the area of Feldkirch to the Rhine. At Rankweil, the river divides into a side and main arm. The smaller one has an own name called Ehbach. Both arms discharge separately at Koblach into the Rhine.

The main settlements on the Frutz are Sulz, Rankweil and Koblach.
