= Alpine Rhine Valley =

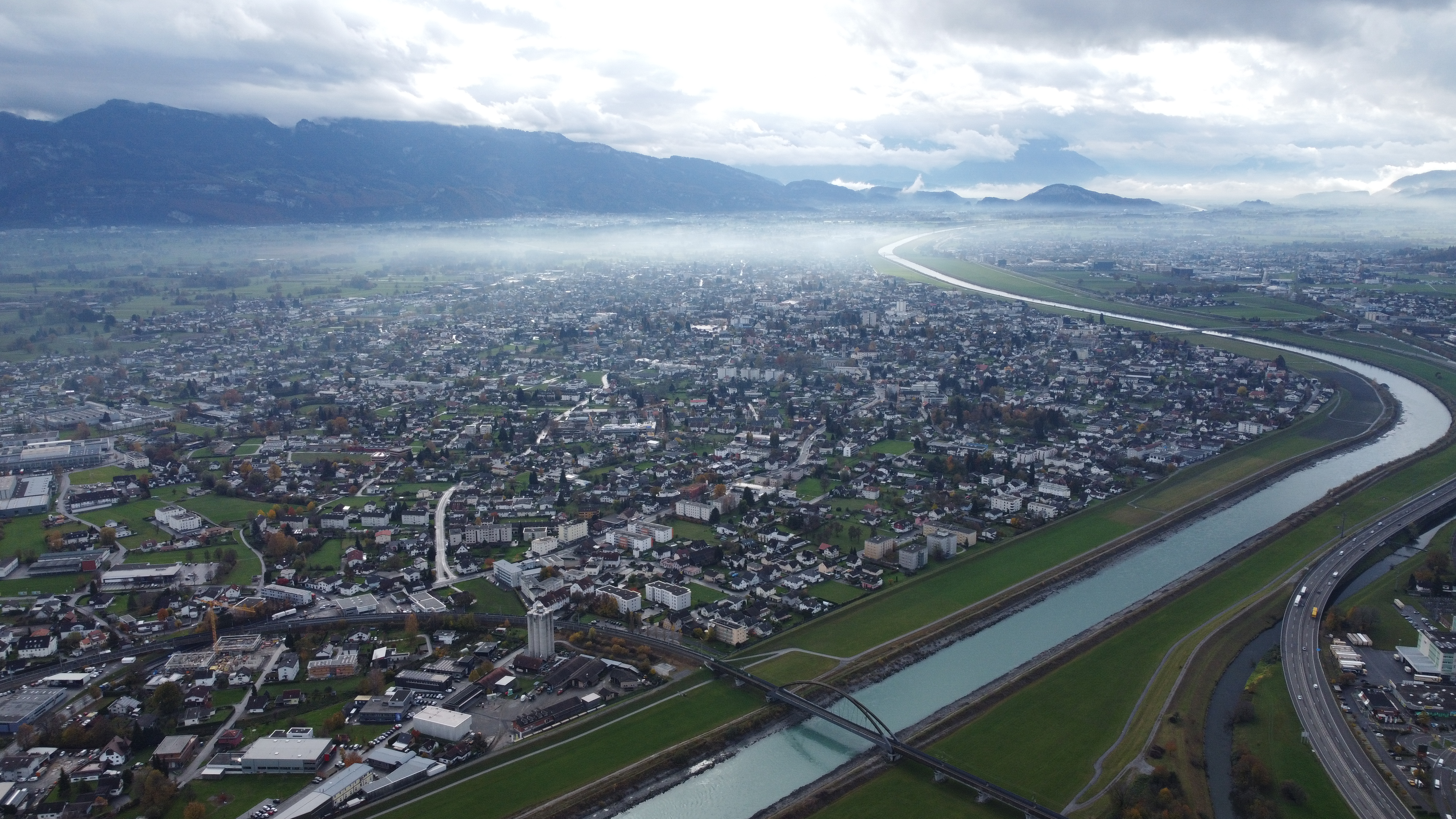
Alpine Rhine near Lustenau

The Alpine Rhine Valley (German: Alpenrheintal) is a glacial alpine valley, formed by the Alpine Rhine (German: Alpenrhein [ˈalpm̩ʁaɪn]), the part of the Rhine between the confluence of the Anterior Rhine and Posterior Rhine at Reichenau and Lake Constance. It covers three countries, with sections of the river demarcating the borders between Austria and Switzerland and between Liechtenstein and Switzerland. The valley is 93 km (58 mi) long. In the upper 9 km (5.6 mi) stretch, the valley width is 1.5 km with narrow (60 m / 200 ft) incised channel. For the next 71 km (44 mi), the valley floor varies between 3 and 4 km (1.9 and 2.5 mi); on approach to Lake Constance the valley widens up to 15 km (9.3 mi).

The Rheintaler Höhenweg is a hiking trail following the valley and overlooking it.

== Geography ==
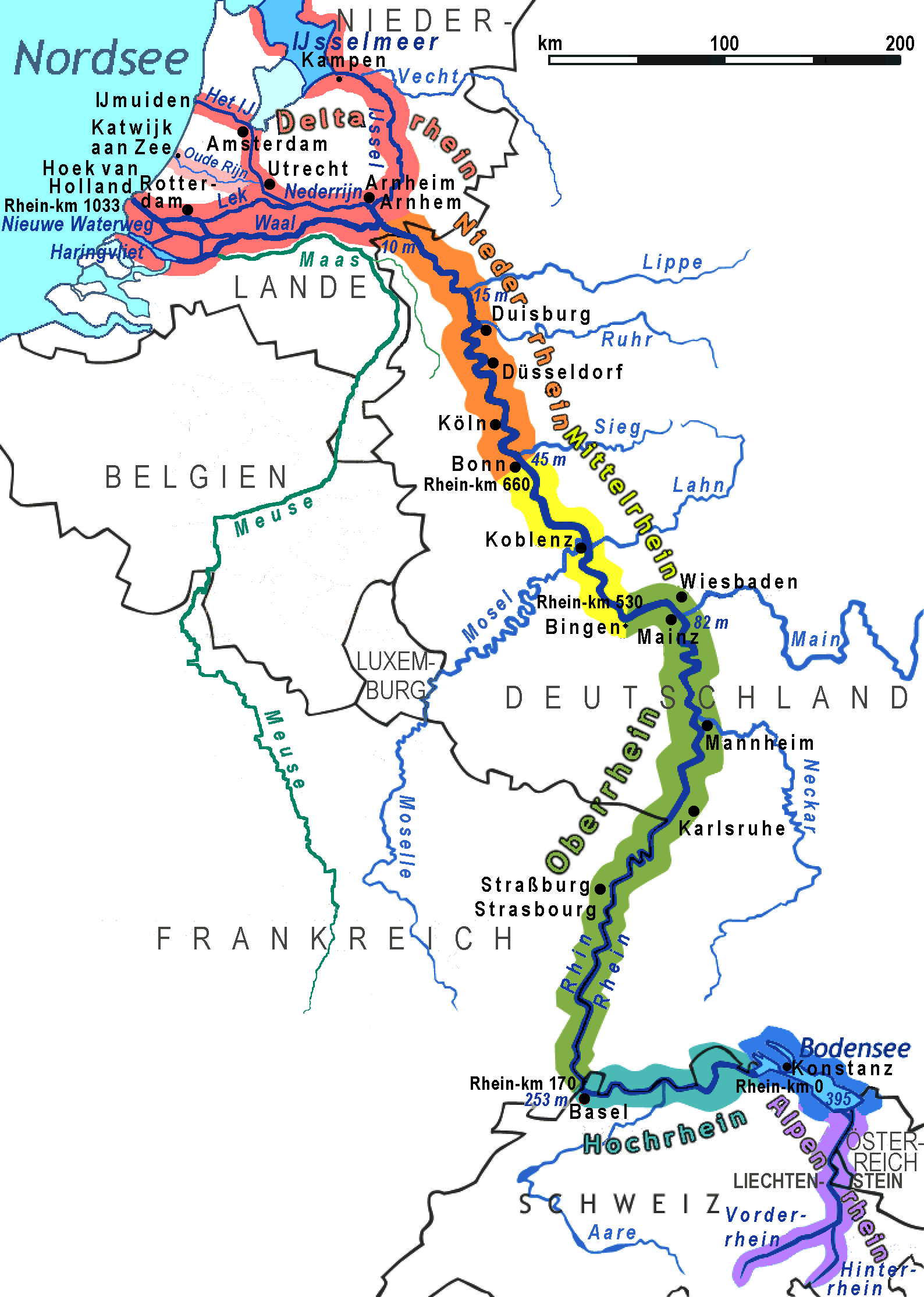
Sections of the Rhine: Rhine–Meuse–Scheldt delta Lower Rhine Middle Rhine Upper Rhine High Rhine Lake Constance (Untersee, Seerhein, Obersee) Alpine Rhine, Vorderrhein, Hinterrhein Rhine sources

The Alpine Rhine Valley is flanked by the Alps and its mountain ranges (especially Alpstein, Plessuralpen, Rätikon Calanda, the Albula Alps and the Glarner Alps), some higher than 3,000 m (9,800 ft). The highest mountain, Ringelspitz, commences next to Tamins. At 3,247 m (10,653 ft), it is the highest peak of the canton of St. Gallen, bordering the valley to its southeast.

From Reichenau, the Alpine Rhine flows east, passing Chur and turning north, before it turns north-east at Landquart, and then roughly north, east of Sargans. From here, the Alpine Rhine forms the border between the canton of St. Gallen of Switzerland on the left, west side, and the Principality of Liechtenstein on the east side. About 28 kilometres (17 mi) further down, the Rhine then meets the Austrian federal state Vorarlberg and finally flows into Lake Constance, south of Lindau (Germany), which is no longer part of the Rhine Valley. The Swiss-Austrian border follows the historical bed of the Rhine, but today the river follows an artificial canal within Austria for the final 5 kilometres (3.1 mi), parallel to the also canalised Dornbirner Ach. The border also still follows the old river bed at Diepoldsau. The Rhine Valley's upper third has the character of an Alpine valley, enclosing a bottom plain of about 1 to 4 kilometres (0.6 to 2.5 mi) across. Downstream of Vaduz, the valley widens considerably, developing into a broad plain, measuring some 10 kilometres (6.2 mi) across at its lower end along the southeastern shores of Upper Lake Constance. The latter is separated from the Lower Lake Constance by a short stretch of the Rhine, called the Seerhein (English: Lake Line). From the point of the Rhine's emergence from Lower Lake Constance, it is known as the High Rhine (Hochrhein).

Right tributaries of the Alpine Rhine are the Plessur in Chur, the Landquart in the town of the same name, the Ill and Frutz on the Upper Land of the Austrian plain near Feldkirch. Several rivers in Liechtenstein drain into a canal, which carries the water to the Alpine Rhine. The Alpine Rhine has no major left tributaries; creeks joining it from the left are the Oldisbach at Chur, Cosenz at Untervaz, Säge at Tardisbrücke, Tamina at Bad Ragaz, Saar at Trübbach, Tobelbach at Buchs, Simml at Gams. Though all left tributaries in the St. Gall Rhine Valley are collected by the Rheintaler Binnenkanal, which flows into Lake of Constance by Alter Rhein, and never meets the Alpine Rhine anymore.

=== Subdivisions ===
Geographical parts of the Alpine Rhine Valley are: Upper half:

- Chur Rhine Valley, or Grisonian Rhine Valley (German: Churer Rheintal, or Bündner Rheintal): The name refers to the town of Chur, or its canton of Graubünden, respectively. It starts at Rhäzüns/Bonaduz and ends east of Sargans (SG).

Lower half:

To the north, the Bündner Rheintal crosses into the Rhine valley between Sargans and Lake of Constance, where it largely forms the border between the canton of St. Gallen on the west side and Liechtenstein and Austria on its east side. The valley is simply called the Rhine Valley on either side. The Swiss sometimes also call it the St. Gall Rhine Valley in order to distinguish it from its upper half.
- St. Gall Rhine Valley (German: St. Galler Rheintal): On its western side, the Rhine Valley is politically further divided into Werdenberg (Wahlkreis) and Rheintal (Wahlkreis), though geographically it is separated by the Hirschensprung near Rüthi (SG).
- Eastern side:
  - On its eastern side, the upper half of the valley is called the Liechtenstein Rhine Valley (German: Liechtensteiner Rheintal).
  - Vorarlberg Rhine Valley (German: Vorarlberger Rheintal): The lower half is also called the Vorarlberg Rhine Valley, since it belongs to the Austrian federal state Vorarlberg. It is further divided into an upper and lower part and referred to as the Upper and Lower Lands (German: Vorarlberger Unter- und Oberland). The Lower Lands, sometimes also called Vorderland, stretches from the shores of Lake Constance to the small hill Kummaberg to the south, the upper part lies south of it.

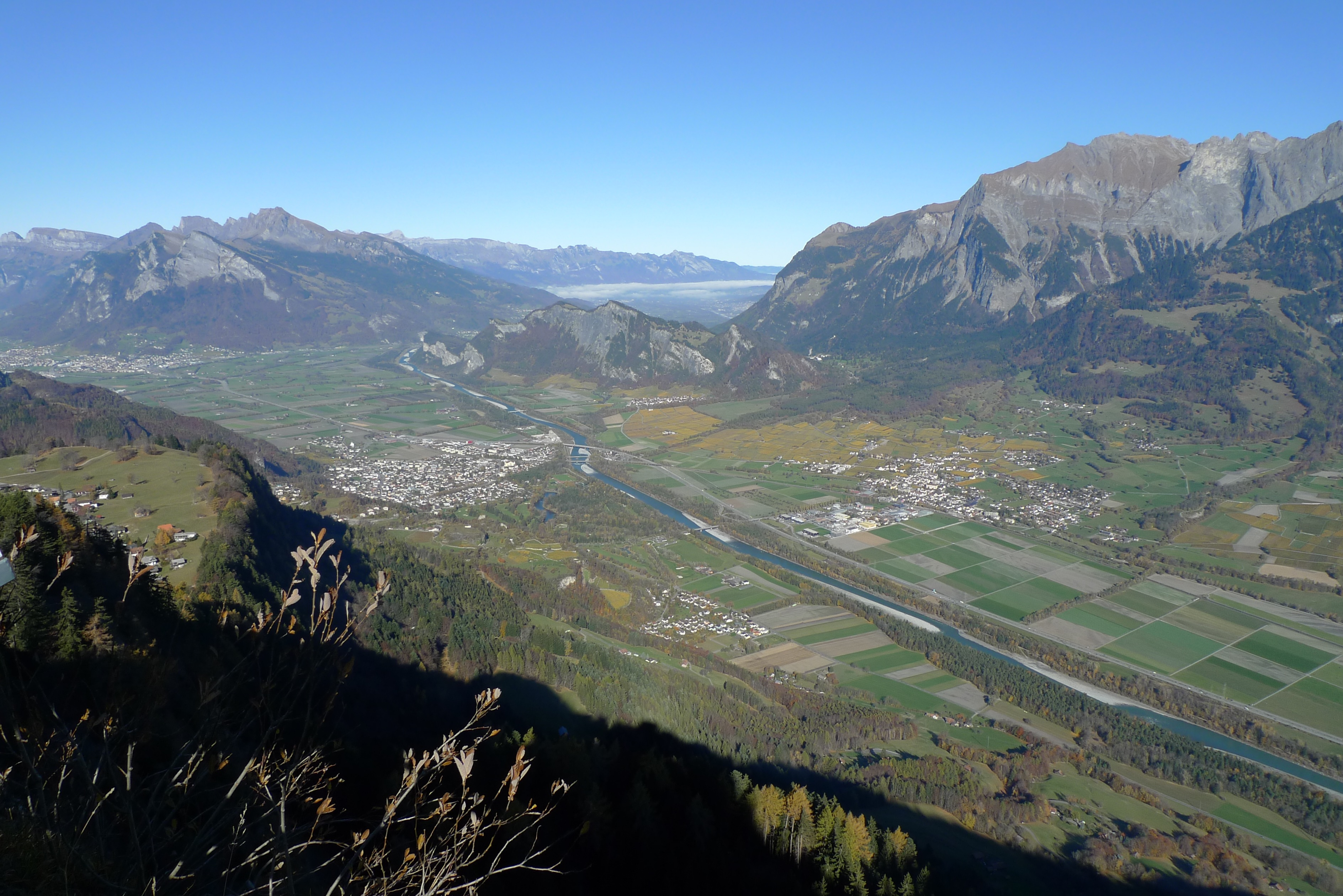
The end of the Grisonian Rhine Valley. In front: Bad Ragaz on the left and Maienfeld on the right.

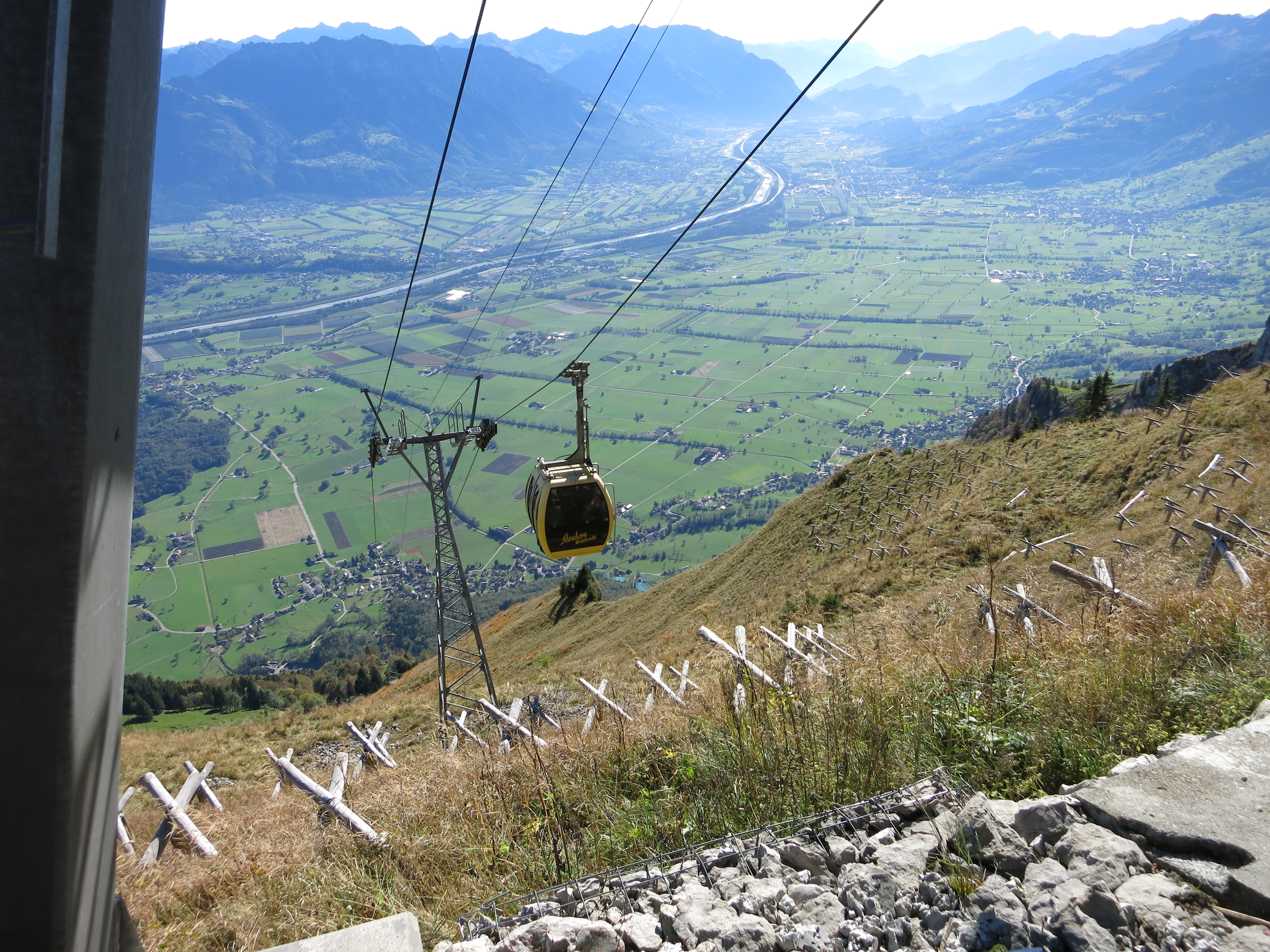
St. Gall Rhine Valley (right of the river) and Liechtenstein Rhine Valley (seen from Mt. Stauberen (1,745 m (5,725 ft))

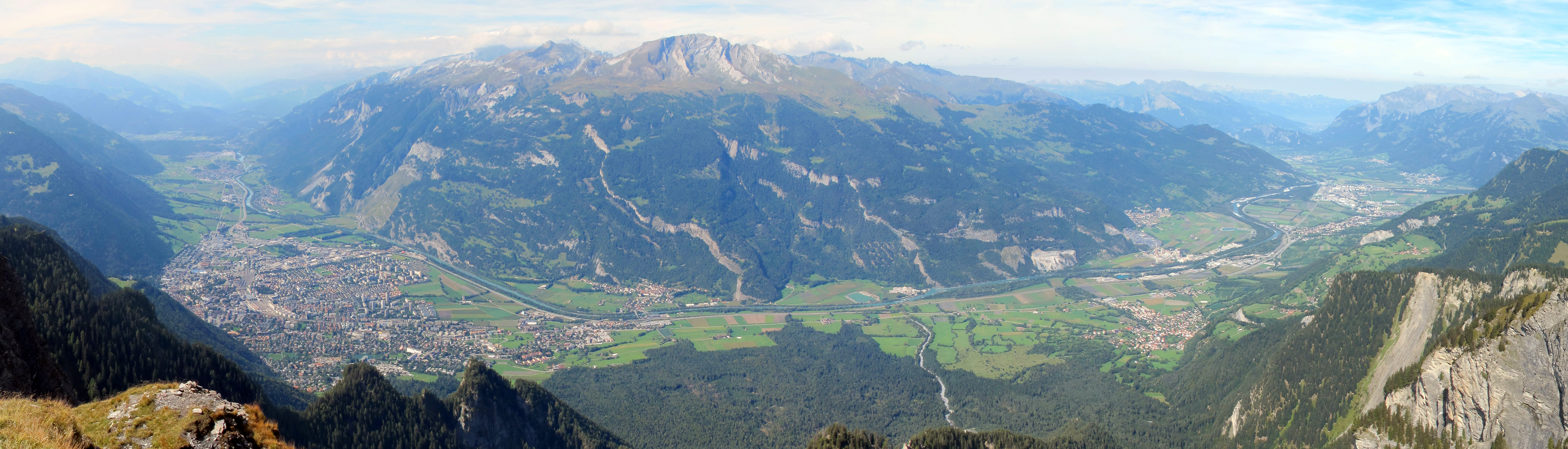
Chur Rhine Valley with Chur

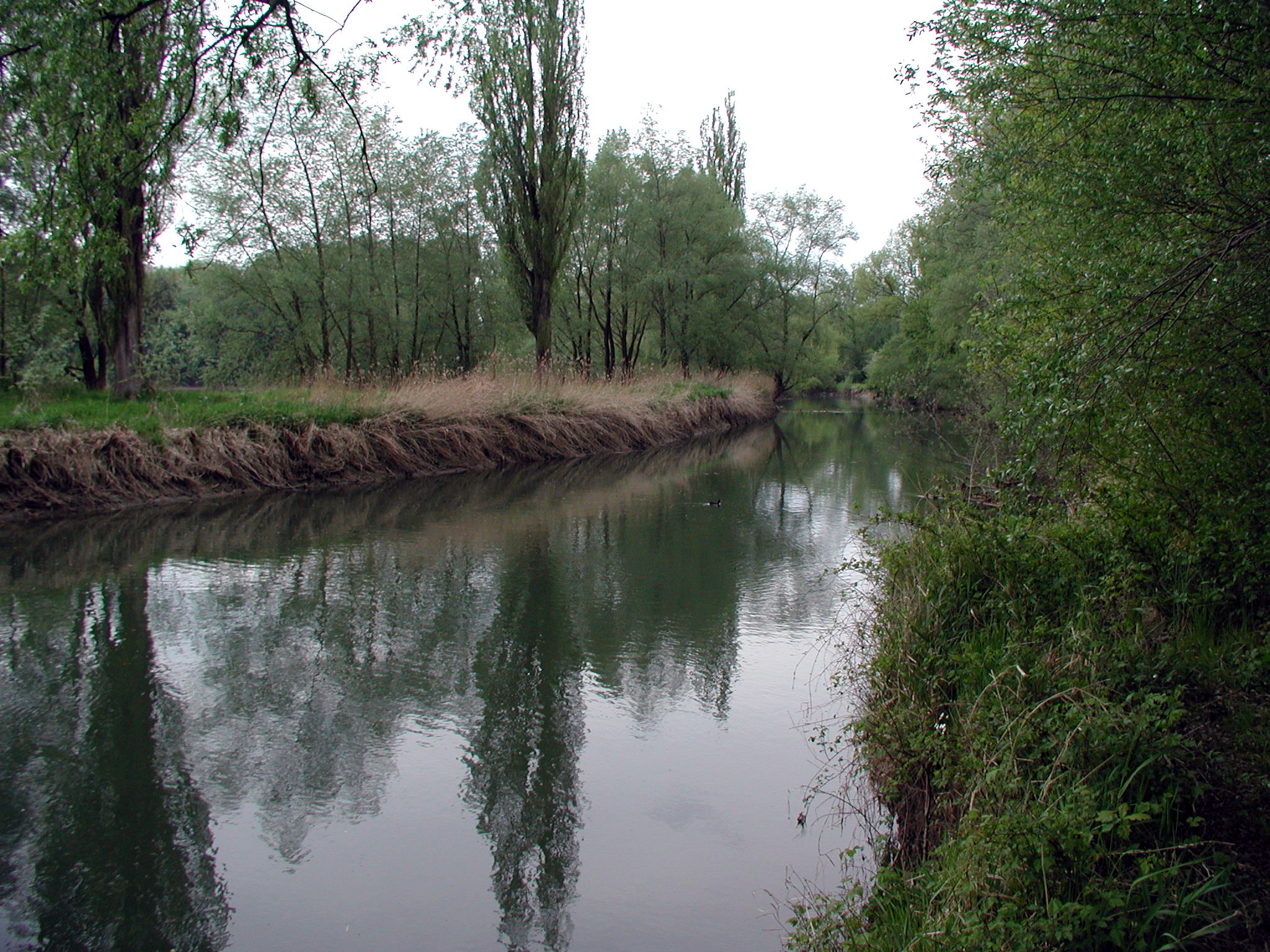
The Old Rhine (Alter Rhein) in Höchst

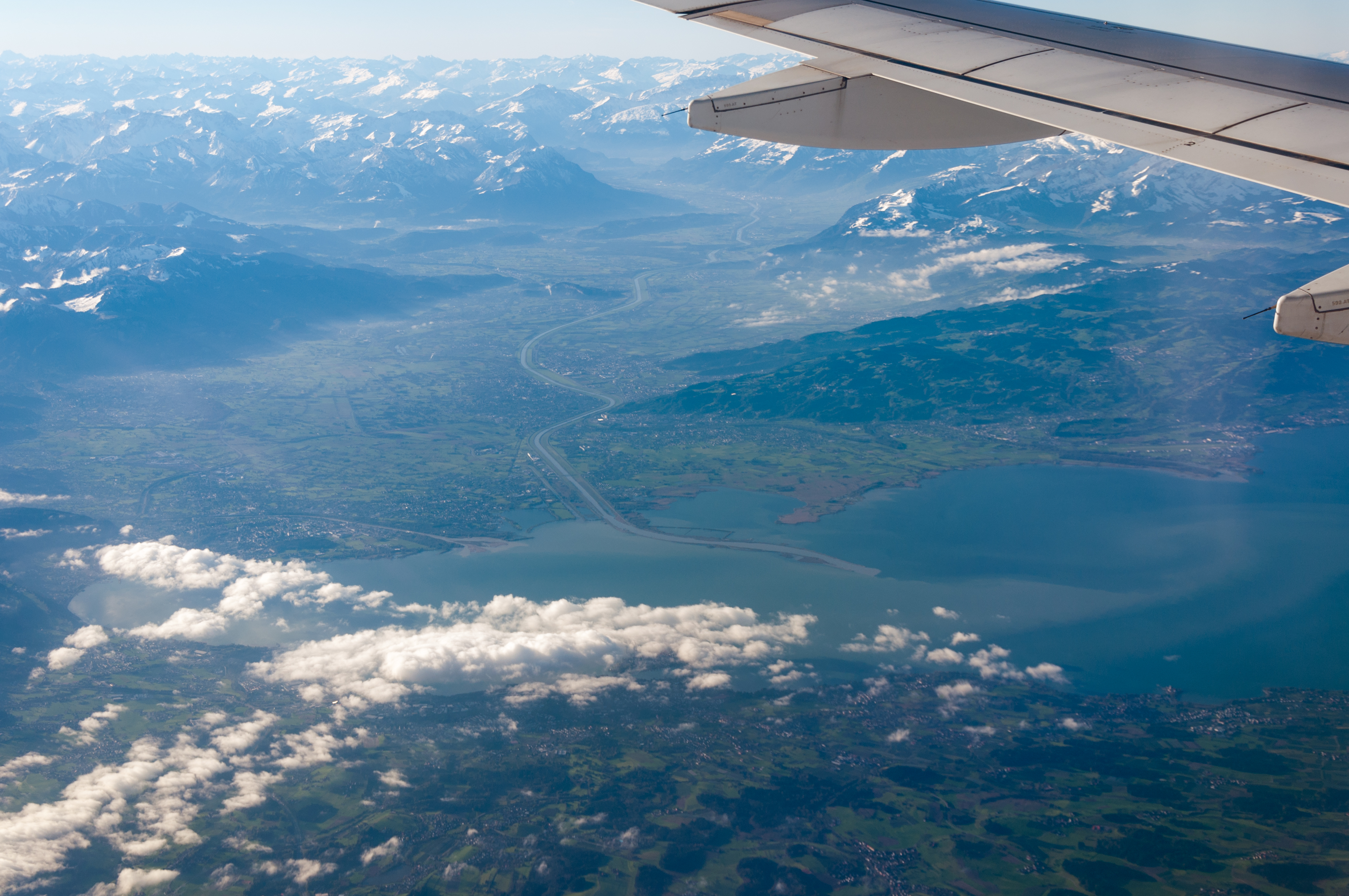
The mouth of the Alpine Rhine in Upper Lake Constance, and the Alpine Rhine Valley looking south

== Culture ==
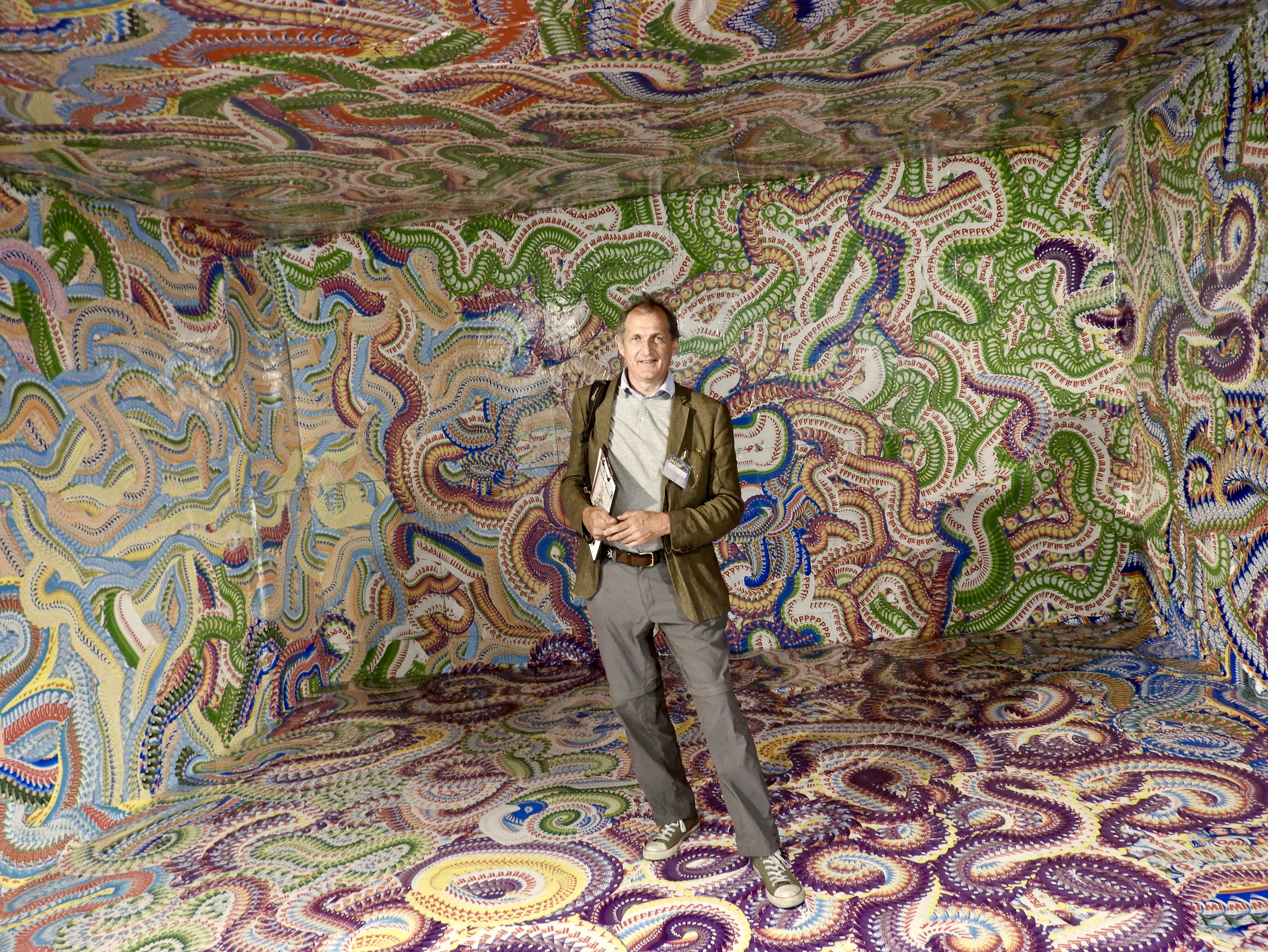
Robert Elwes at ART BODENSEE 2019

The Alpine Rhine Valley is characterised by a very active culture scene. The Bregenzer Festspiele as well as the Kunstmuseum Liechtenstein have great significance and popularity beyond the region. From a regional perspective, there are many platforms, events and projects that enhance the cultural life of the inhabitants and the local actors. In Widnau, the only international artistic gymnastics tournament for male juniors and seniors in Switzerland takes place. It's named Rheintalcup after the Alpine Rhine Valley.

An example of cross-border cooperation in the Alpine Rhine Valley is the cultural axis of the cities Bregenz, St.Gallen, Vaduz and Chur: The Kunsthaus Bregenz, the Kunstmuseum St. Gallen, the Kunstmuseum Liechtenstein and the Bündner Kunstmuseum in Chur have been cooperating since 2001. Visible signs of this cooperation of the four institutions from three countries are the joint presentations on the "ART BODENSEE" each year.

== History ==
=== Middle Ages ===
The valley was part of the ancient Roman province of Raetia. The Alemannic people settled the lower Rhine Valley in the early Middle Ages. Under the Frankish Empire, the Rheintal between Montstein and Hirschensprung was given to the Rhinegraviate (the county of the Rheingau), and its first recorded mention is in 891; the area between Lake Constance and Montstein was a part of the Thurgau.

Rule of the Rhine Valley was fragmented throughout the Middle Ages, with the Holy Roman Emperor, the Bishop of Constance, the Abbot of St Gall and the counts of Bregenz and Werdenberg all claiming various portions of the valley. It was not until 1348 that the Rheintal was united, under the county of Werdenberg-Heiligenberg. From when the Habsburgs acquired the county of Tyrol in 1363, they gradually began to gain control of the Rhine Valley, gaining the whole valley through a combination of conquest and purchase by 1395.

==== Vogtei Rheintal ====
By 1424, the Rhine Valley was largely in the hands of the counts of Toggenburg. After their extinction, Appenzell reconquered the Rheintal with Rheineck in the Old Zürich War in 1445. In 1464, Appenzell protected the Rheintal from the territorial claims of the prince-abbot of St Gall, particularly in a series of battles at the time of the "Rorschacher Klosterbruch", the casus belli for the St Gallerkrieg between 28 July 1489 and the spring of 1490. Nevertheless, Appenzell was forced to cede the governing protectorship of the Valley to the warring powers—the Abbey and the four cantons of Glarus, Lucerne, Schwyz, and Zürich—bringing the bailiwick into the ambit of the Old Swiss Confederation as a Gemeine Herrschaft (condominium).

=== Swiss Reformation ===
In 1528, the Protestant Reformation was accepted in the Vogtei Rheintal; whilst Roman Catholic minorities remained, only Altstätten, Widnau, Kriessern and Rüthi had a Catholic majority. Through the defeat of the Catholic hegemony over Switzerland and the end of the lengthy religious disputes that had riven the Confederacy, the 11 August 1712 Peace of Aarau (German: Frieden von Aarau) established confessional parity, allowing both faiths to coexist in legal equality—a concept relatively common to the Holy Roman Empire since the Peace of Westphalia in 1648.

==== Liechtenstein ====
The Liechtenstein dynasty was able to arrange the purchase of the minuscule Herrschaft ("Lordship") of Schellenberg and county of Vaduz (in 1699 and 1712 respectively) from the Hohenems. On 23 January 1719, after the lands had been purchased, Charles VI, Holy Roman Emperor, decreed that Vaduz and Schellenberg were united and elevated the newly formed territory to the dignity of Fürstentum (principality) with the name "Liechtenstein" in honour of "[his] true servant, Anton Florian of Liechtenstein". It was on this date that Liechtenstein became a sovereign member state of the Holy Roman Empire. It is a testament to the pure political expediency of the purchases that the Princes of Liechtenstein did not set foot in their new principality for over 120 years.

=== Napoleonic era ===
As a result of the Napoleonic Wars, by 1806 the Holy Roman Empire was under the control of French emperor Napoleon I. Napoleon dissolved the empire; this had broad consequences for Liechtenstein: imperial, legal and political mechanisms broke down. The state ceased to owe obligations to any feudal lord beyond its borders.

In 1798, the Vogtei Rheintal unilaterally declared its independence. In the aftermath of the collapse of the Old Swiss Confederation (resulting from it being completely overrun by the French Revolutionary Armies), on 26 March 1798, a Landsgemeinde in Altstätten promulgated a constitution and elected both a magistrate (German: Landammann) and a council (German: Landsrat). Within weeks, however, this nascent independence was quashed with the inclusion of the Rheintal into the Helvetic canton of Säntis, with the exception of Rüthi and Lienz, assigned to canton of Linth.

With Napoleon's Act of Mediation on 19 February 1803, the Helvetic Republic and its cantonal boundaries were abolished, with the Rheintal reunited as a district of the canton of St. Gallen, stretching from Staad to Lienz and with its capital alternating monthly between Altstätten and Rheineck.

=== Modern history ===
The Bezirk was split in twain in 1831, creating Oberrheintal, with its capital in Altstätten, and Unterrheintal, with its capital alternating between Rheineck and Berneck, St. Gallen. This division persisted until 2003, when a constitutional revision created the modern constituency (Wahlkreis), with the loss of Thal to the adjacent Wahlkreis of Rorschach.

== Transportation ==
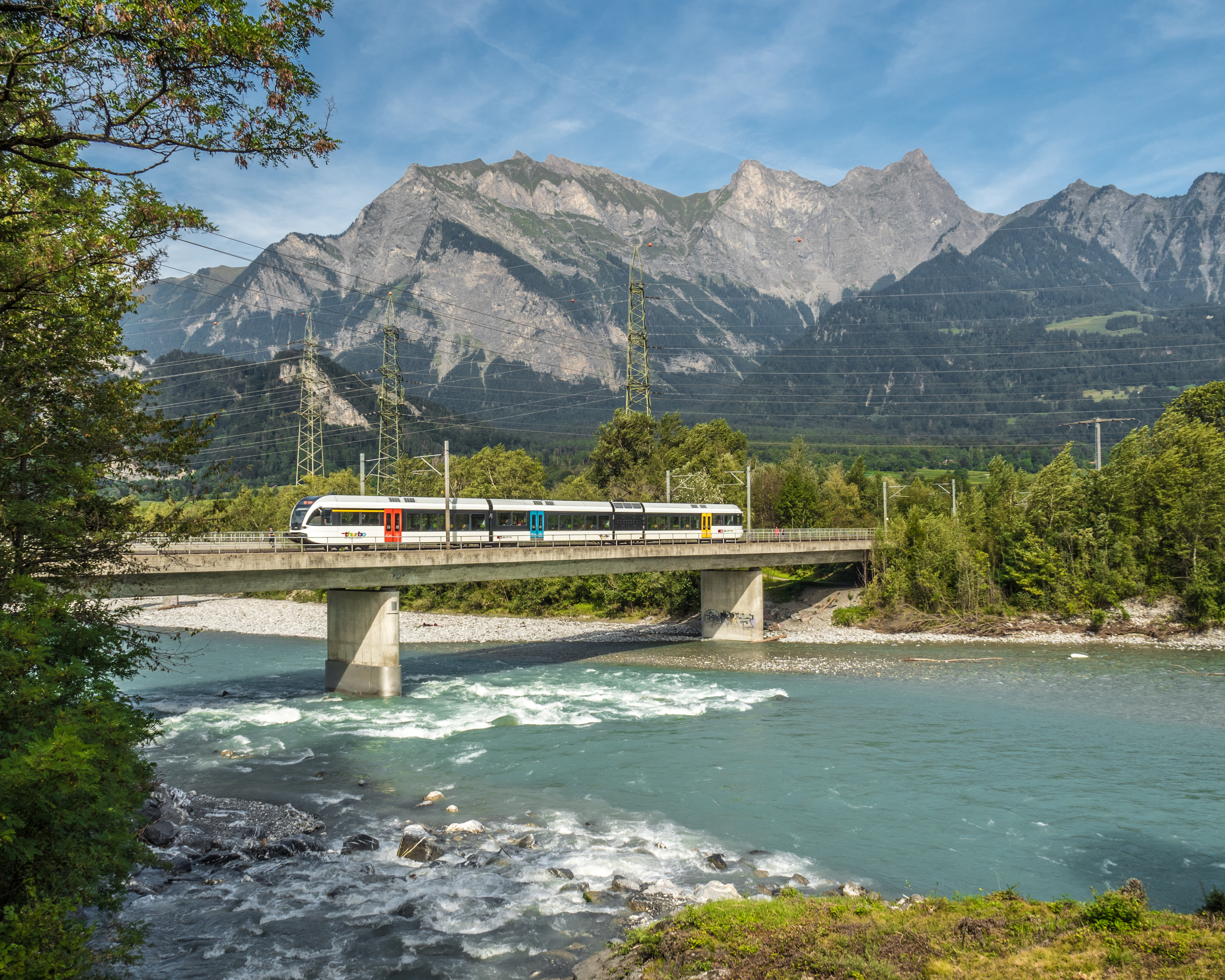
Thurbo trainset crossing the Alpine Rhine between Bad Ragaz and Maienfeld

There is no shipping on the Alpine Rhine.

Within Switzerland, the river is followed (from south to north) by the Landquart–Thusis railway line (on the right bank side between Reichenau-Tamins and Landquart) and the Chur–Rorschach railway line (between Chur and Maienfeld on the right bank side and between Bad Ragaz and St. Margrethen on the left bank side). Between St. Margrethen and Rheineck, the line follows the Old Rhine.

The Vorarlberg Railway line runs in north–south direction through the Vorarlberg portion of the Alpine Rhine Valley. It connects Feldkirch and Bregenz and continues northwards to Lindau-Insel (Germany).

Two cross-border railway lines traverse the Alpine Rhine. The St. Margrethen–Lauterach line (between St. Margrethen and Lustenau) and the Feldkirch–Buchs railway line (between Buchs SG and Schaan-Vaduz, continues across the Austria–Liechtenstein border to Feldkirch).

Regional train services are provided by Chur S-Bahn, Bodensee S-Bahn, St. Gallen S-Bahn and Vorarlberg S-Bahn.

== See also ==
- Geography of the Alps
  - List of valleys of the Alps
- International Rhine Regulation Railway

== Sources ==
- Lorenz Hollenstein: "Rheintal" in German, French and Italian in the online Historical Dictionary of Switzerland.
- Uehlinger, Urs; Wantzen, Karl M.; Leuven, Rob S.E.W.; Arndt, Hartmut (2009-01-31). "The Rhine River Basin". In Tockner, Klement; Uehlinger, Urs; Robinson, Christopher T. (eds.). Rivers of Europe. Academic Press. ISBN 978-0-08-091908-9.
