= Rheintalcup =

Artistic gymnastics competition in Switzerland

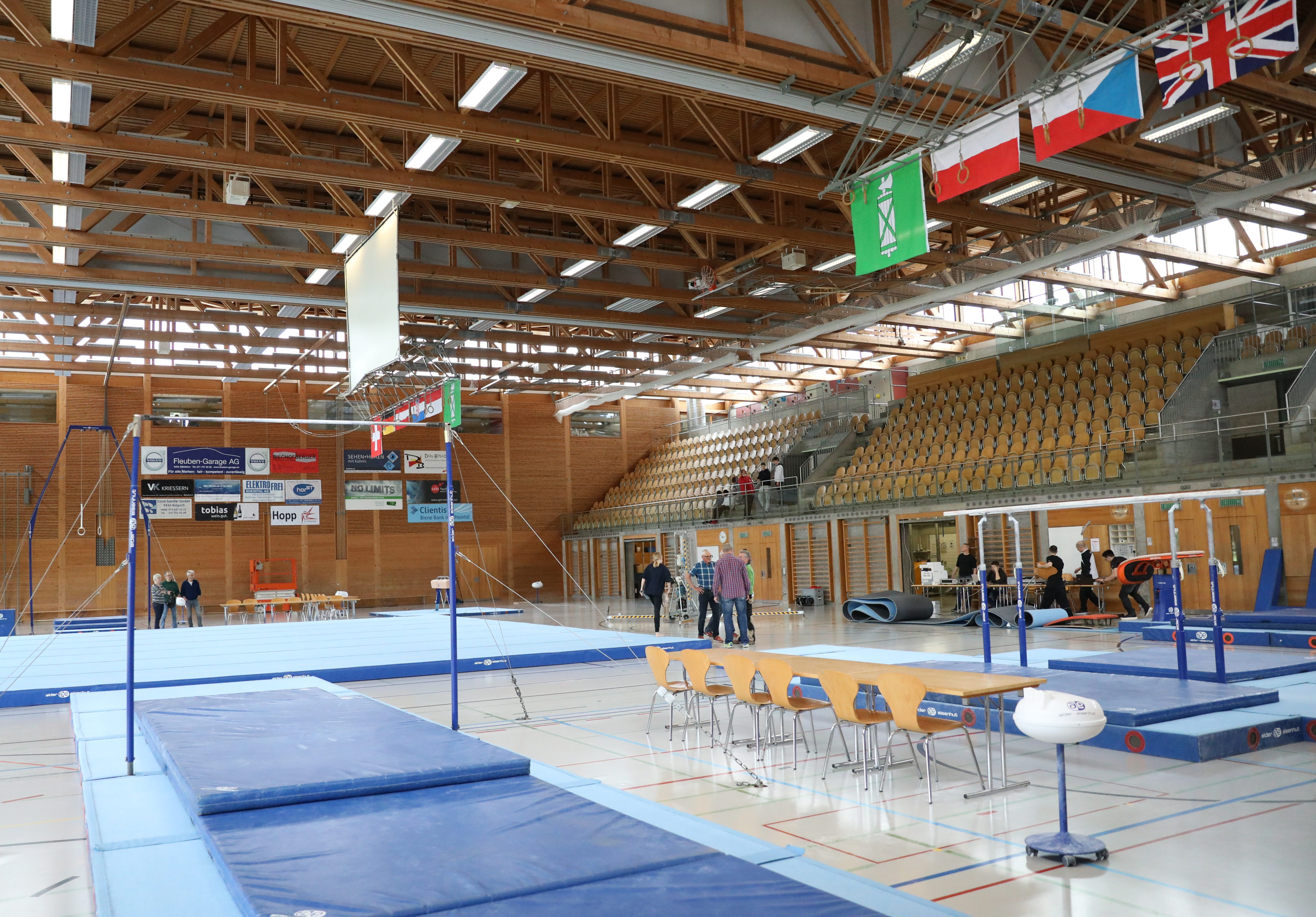
View into the competition hall at the 25th Rheintalcup 2022

The Rheintalcup is the only international artistic gymnastics tournament for male juniors and seniors in Switzerland. Since 1996, the competition takes place in Widnau in St. Gallen Rhine Valley (Rheintal). The Rheintalcup serves older gymnasts as a qualifying competition for various national and international competitions in the junior and senior sections. On a second day of competition, younger Swiss gymnasts compete there as part of the annual Ostschweizer Cup (Eastern Switzerland Cup).

== History ==
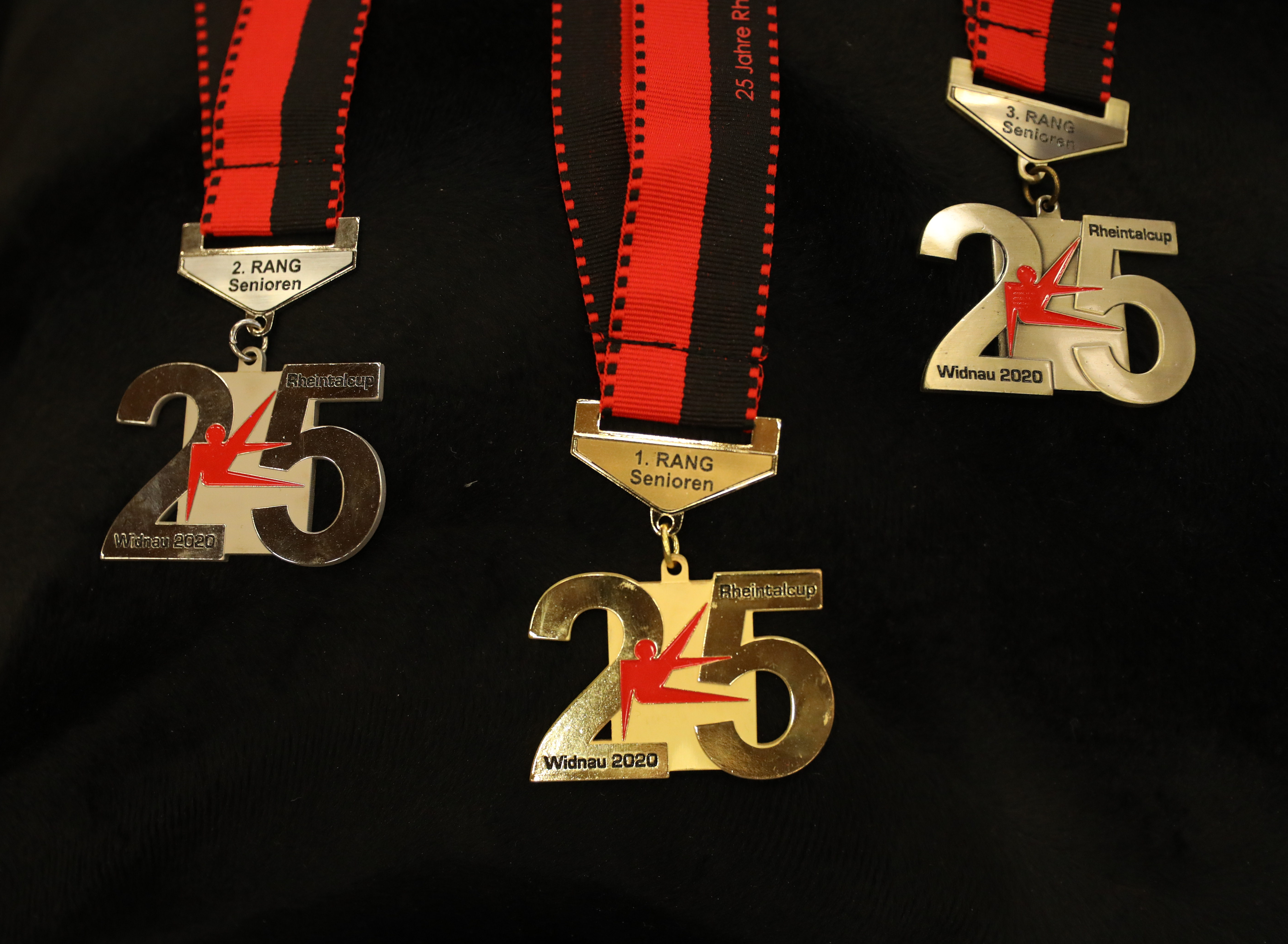
Medals for the victory ceremony in the international senior competition at the 25th anniversary of the Rheintalcup

Artistic gymnastics competitions were held in the St. Gallen Rhine Valley between 1985 and 1994. Before the first Rheintalcup took place in the Oberstufenzentrum Kleewies (high school) on 9 April 1995, the Meyer Cup was held ten times in Diepoldsau at the same place. The competition got its name from the region. Since the second edition in 1996, the competition has been held annually in Widnau, most recently in the Sporthalle Aegeten (sports hall). There were exceptions to the annual rhythm in 2006, when the St. Galler Kunstturnertage (artistic gymnastics days) took place instead, and in 2020 and 2021 due to the cancellations in the COVID-19 pandemic. The 25th anniversary edition, which was already planned in these years, was deferred to 2022. In the beginning, the competition only consisted of a regional part, in later years it was supplemented by an international part.

== Organization ==
The organizer of the competition is the Turnzentrum Rheintal (Gymnastic Centre). The association was founded in 1995 by the TZ Diepoldau (later KTZ Diepoldsau-Schmitter) and offers training opportunities for boys from 4 to 13 years of age before they can qualify for training in the Regionales Leistungszentrum Ost (Regional Training Center East) in Wil. The competitions at the Rheintalcup take place early in the competition year and often serve as orientation for the gymnasts. Unlike other international competitions in other countries, the largest international competition in artistic gymnastics for male juniors and seniors in Switzerland is not organized by a national but by a local organizer. The Swiss Cup, which has an even higher international profile and takes place at the end of the competition year, offers a kind of cup competition with duels between two countries and separates the junior and senior competitions instead of an all-around competition with finals.

As is usual with other competitions of this kind, the Rheintalcup is supported not only by entry fees, but also primarily by sponsorship, raffles and the commitment of volunteers from the association, and generates a quarter of the annual budget of the Turnzentrum Rheintal. In addition to show competitions by local gymnastics groups, majorettes from the Czech Republic are part of the program and show their exercises at the award ceremonies and accompany the gymnasts when they march in and change apparatus during the competitions. In the Sportzentrum Aegeten itself there are rooms for participants in the competition.

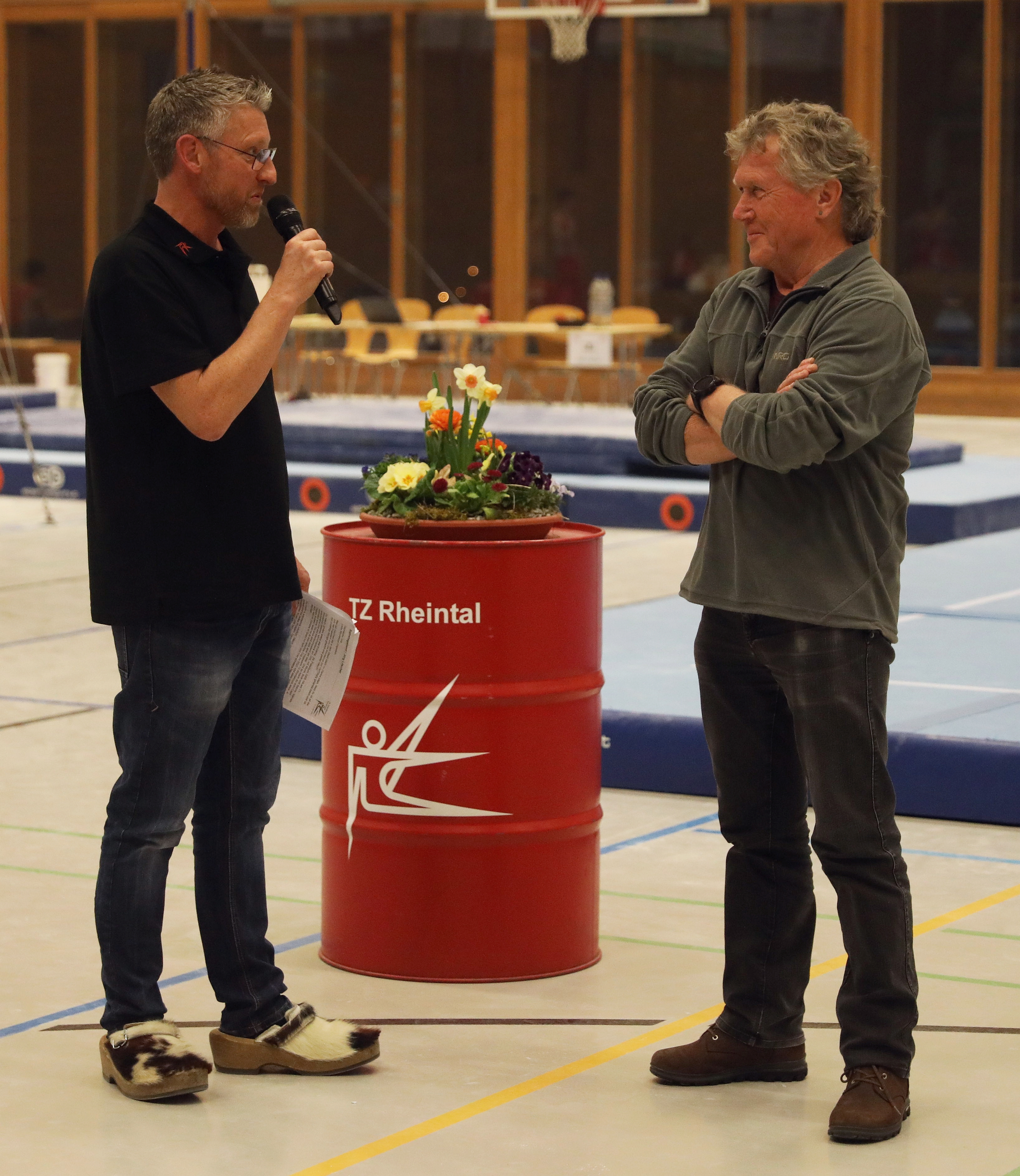
Honoring of the former by the current competition director

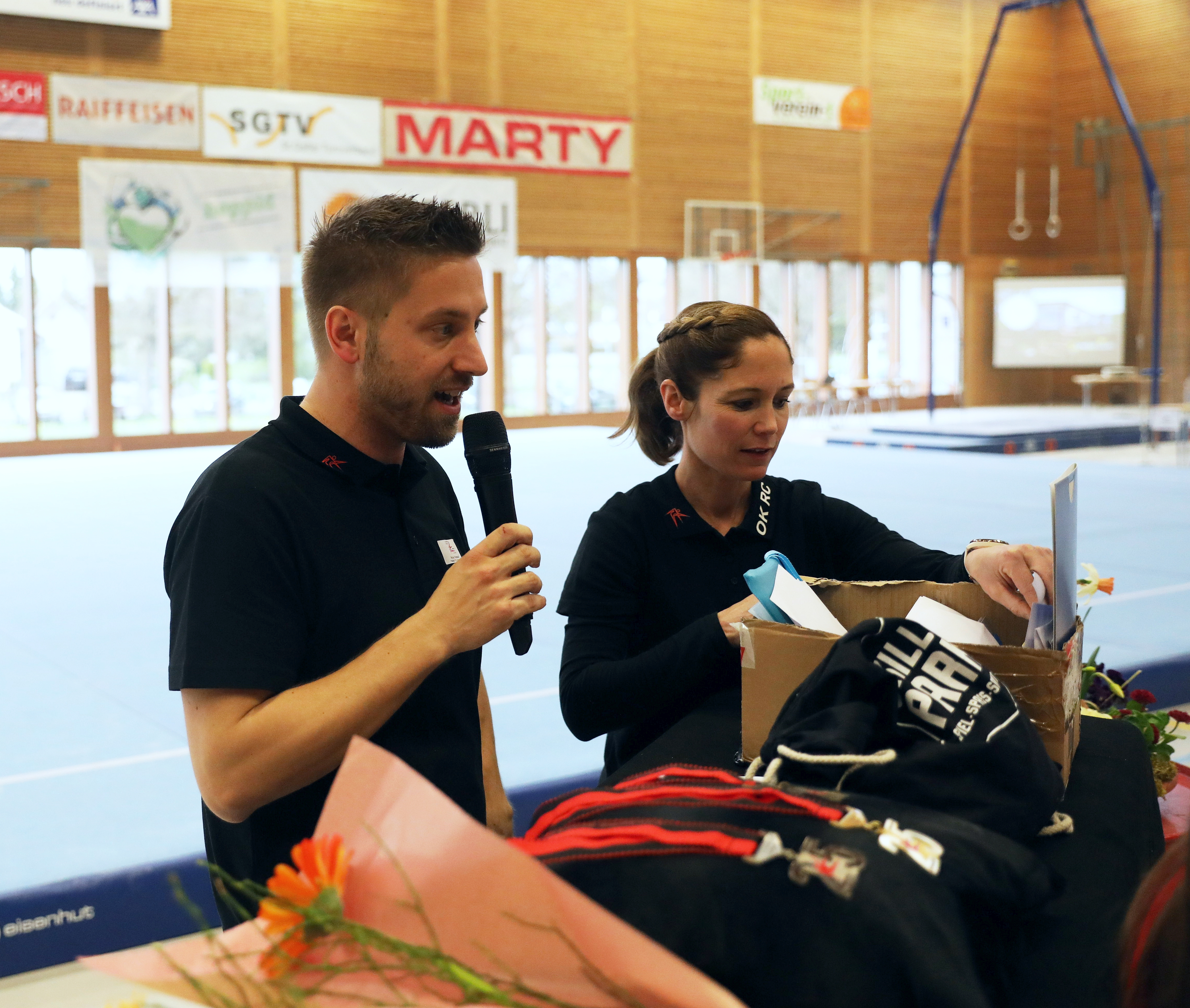
Organization of a raffle by the club president

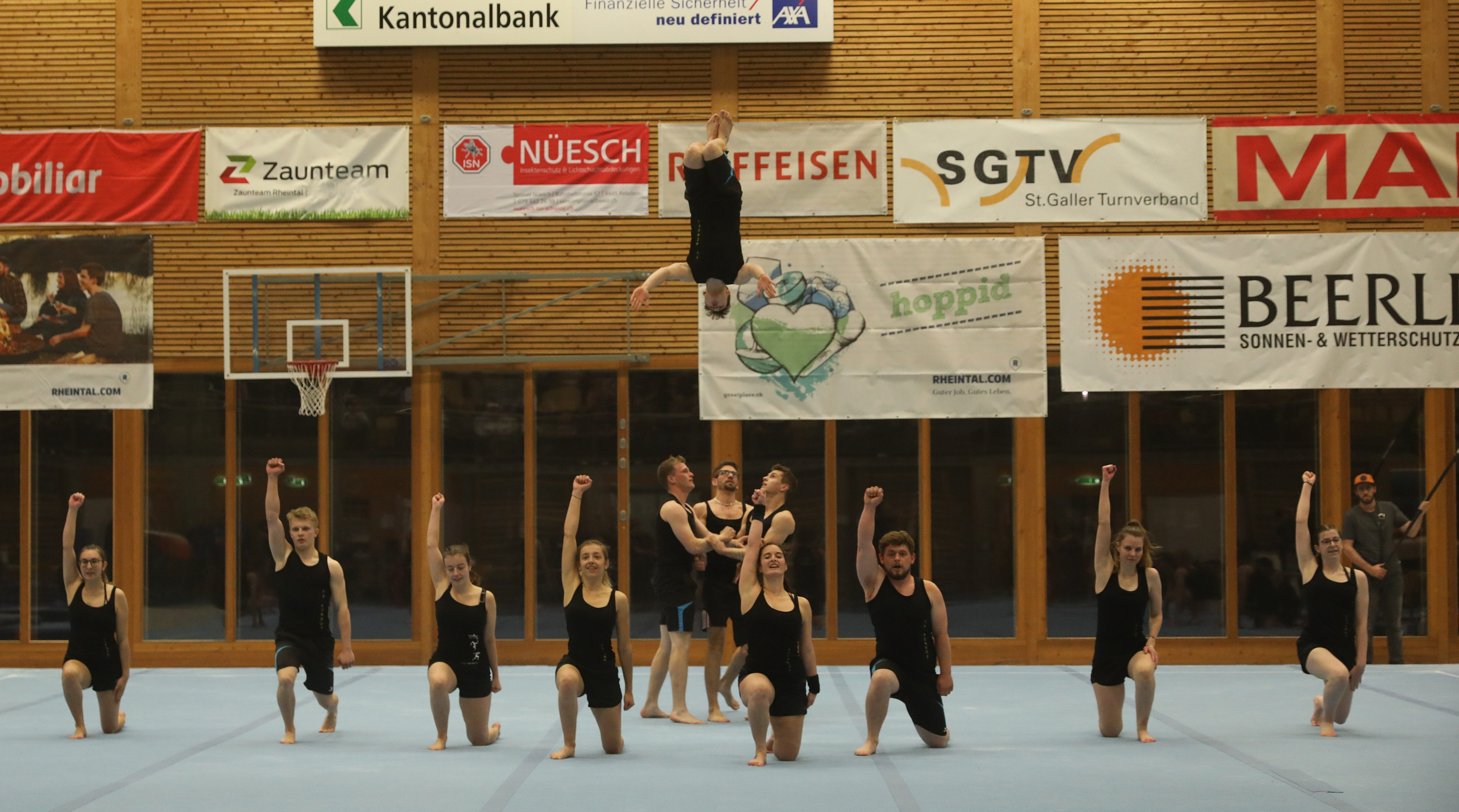
Performance by a local gymnastics group

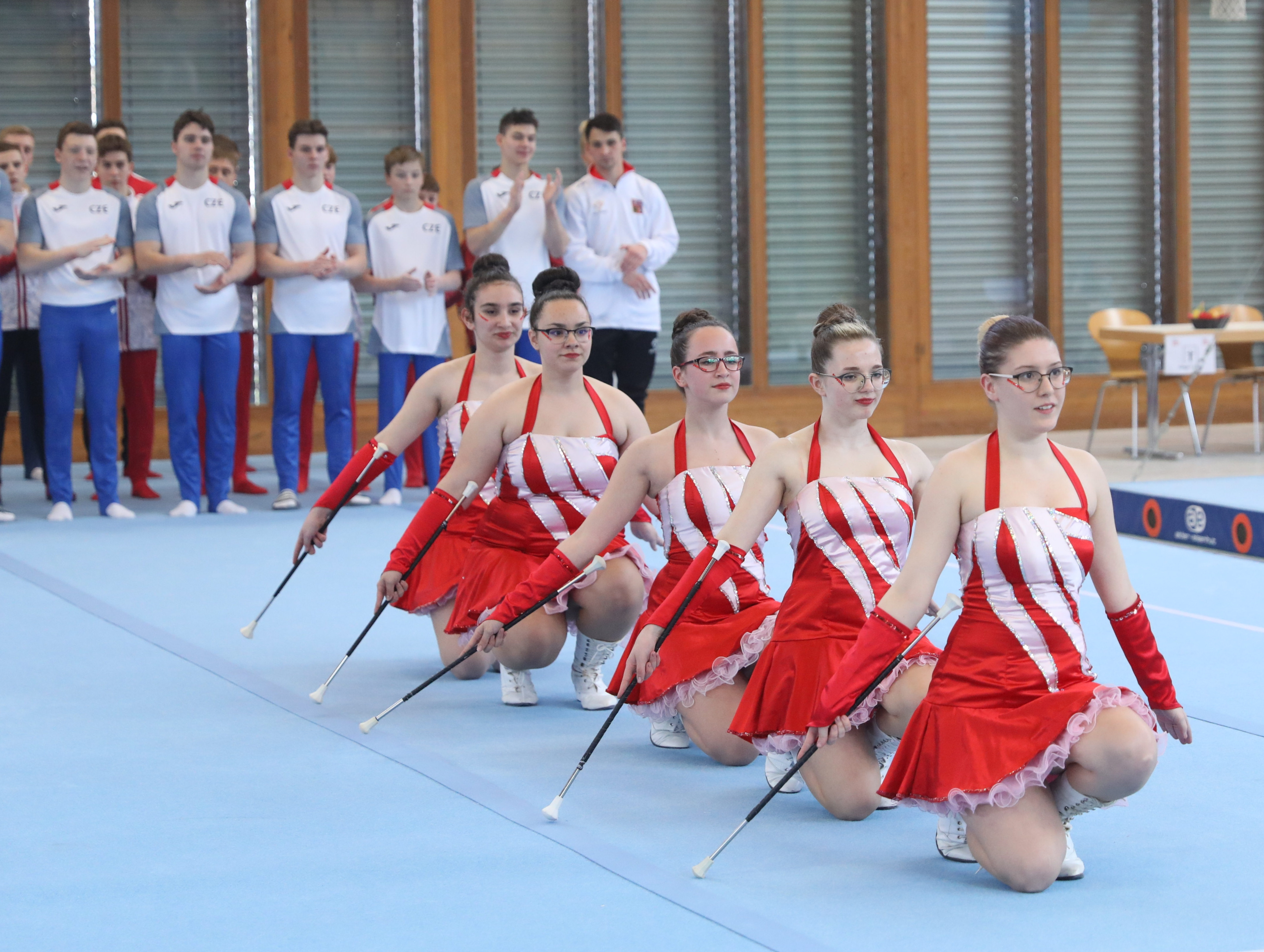
Majorettes at a performance

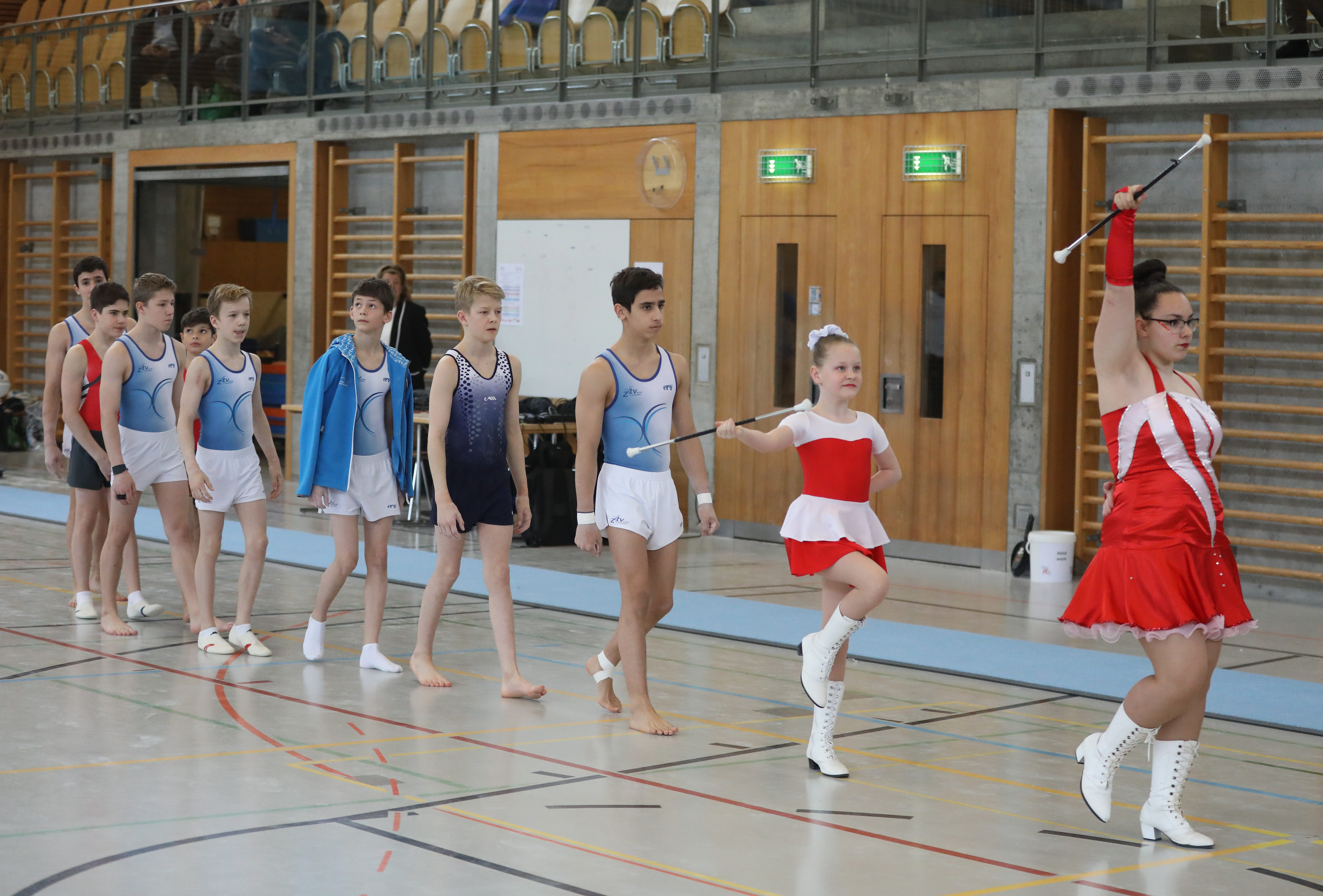
Accompaniment of gymnasts from the Zurich Gymnastics Association during rotations by the majorettes

== Execution ==
=== Friday: Setup and training ===
Since the competition weekend cannot take place in the small training hall of the TZ Rheintal, the multi-purpose hall in the Sportzentrum Aegeten in Widnau will be used for the event. The mats prescribed by the International Gymnastics Federation and the six pieces of Olympic gymnastics apparatus are set up on the hall floor by club volunteers.

As is usual in international competitions, there will be a podium training session on the set-up apparatus before the competition, which will allow the gymnasts to make final preparations. On the one hand, the special features of these devices should be learned in order to adapt for the competition. On the other hand, entire exercises or relevant elements can be tried out again on the equipment on site in order to determine the final exercise for the competition together with the coach. Since the training for juniors and seniors from all participating countries is designed as free training, there is also the opportunity to get to know gymnasts and their elements better in advance. However, there is no obligation to participate in this training. In a concluding technical session, the demands and needs of the delegations for the devices will also be discussed.

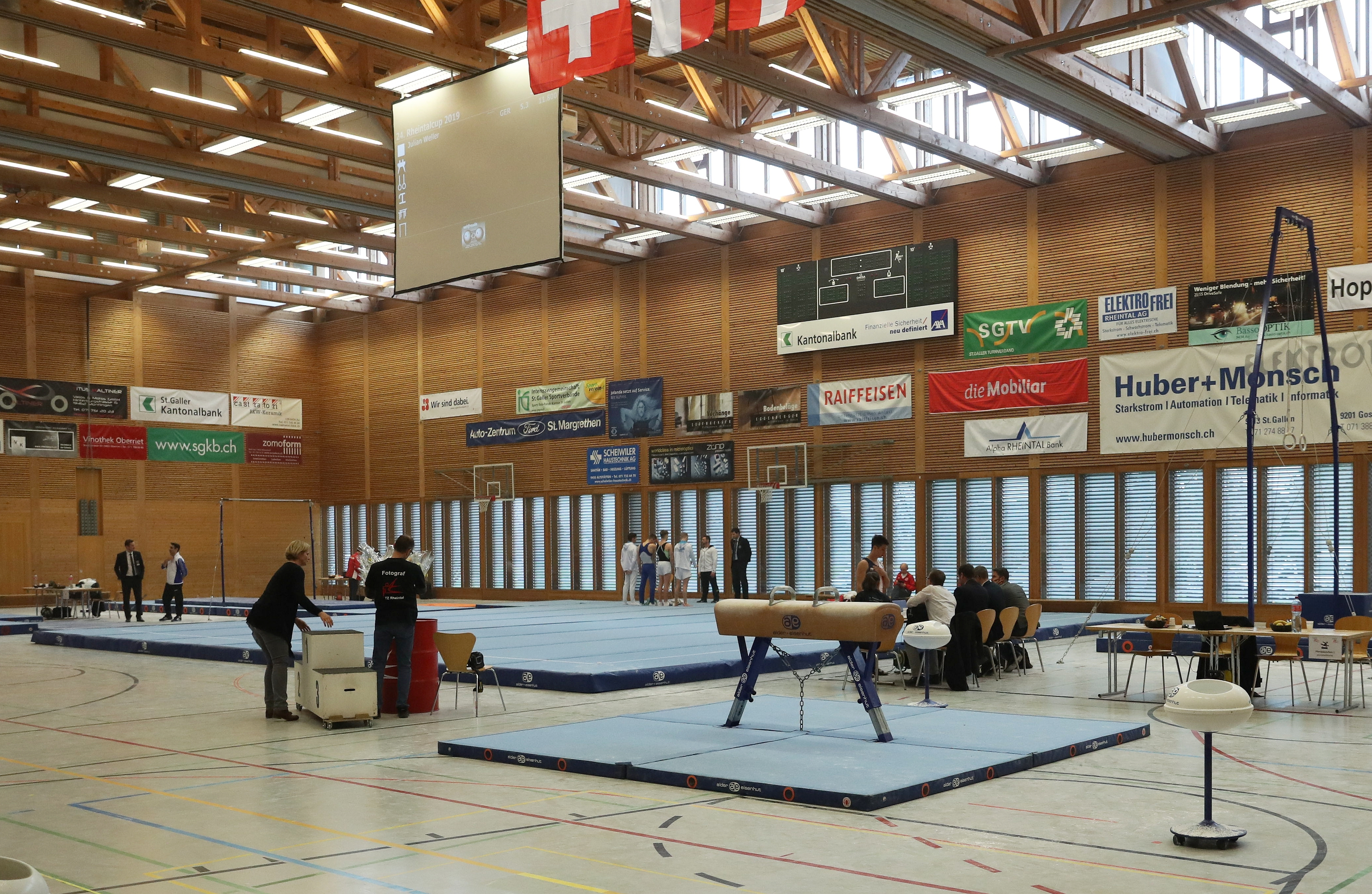
Preparation of the competition hall with flags of the participating countries on the hall ceiling

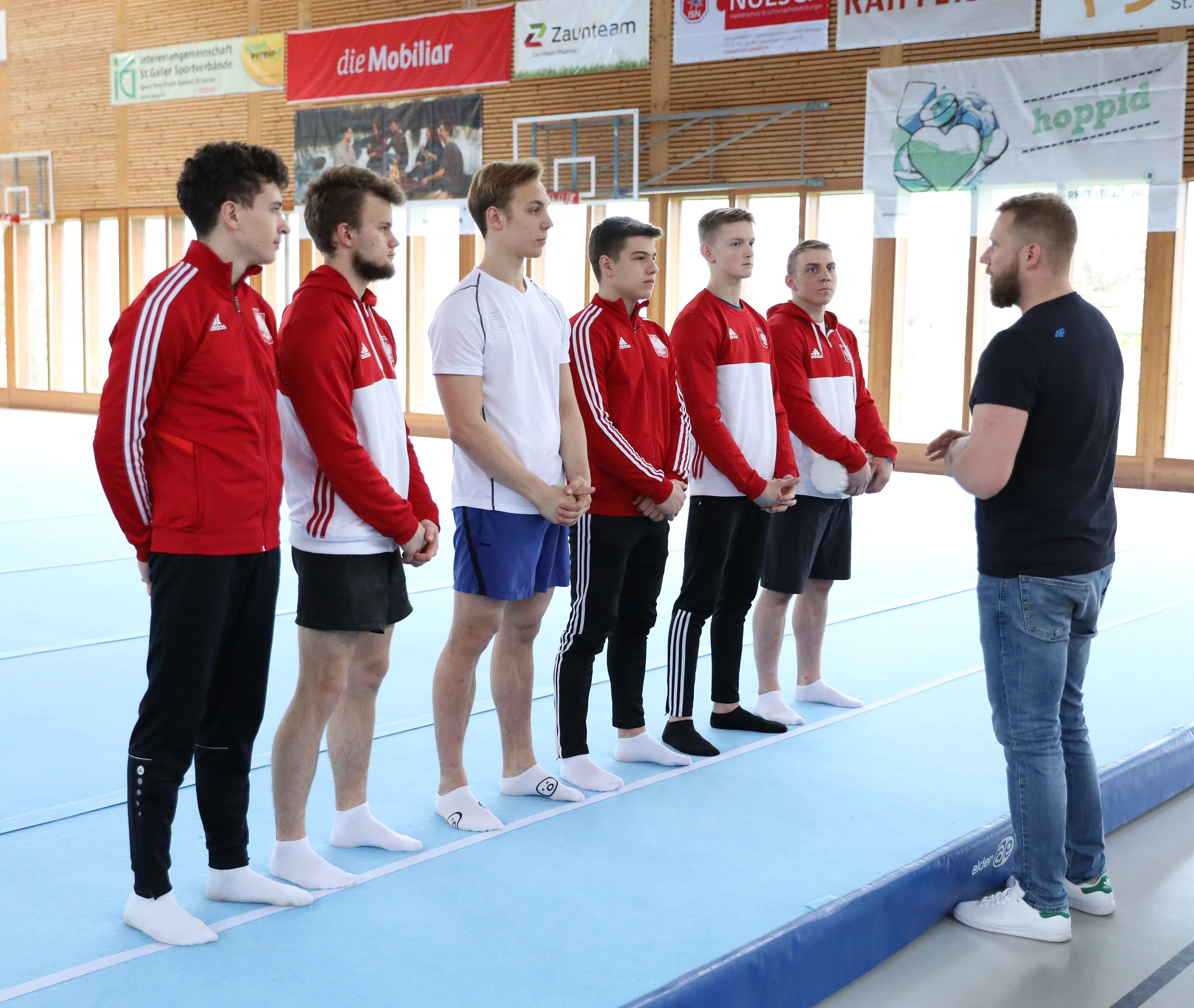
Appeal from a team (here Poland) before the podium training

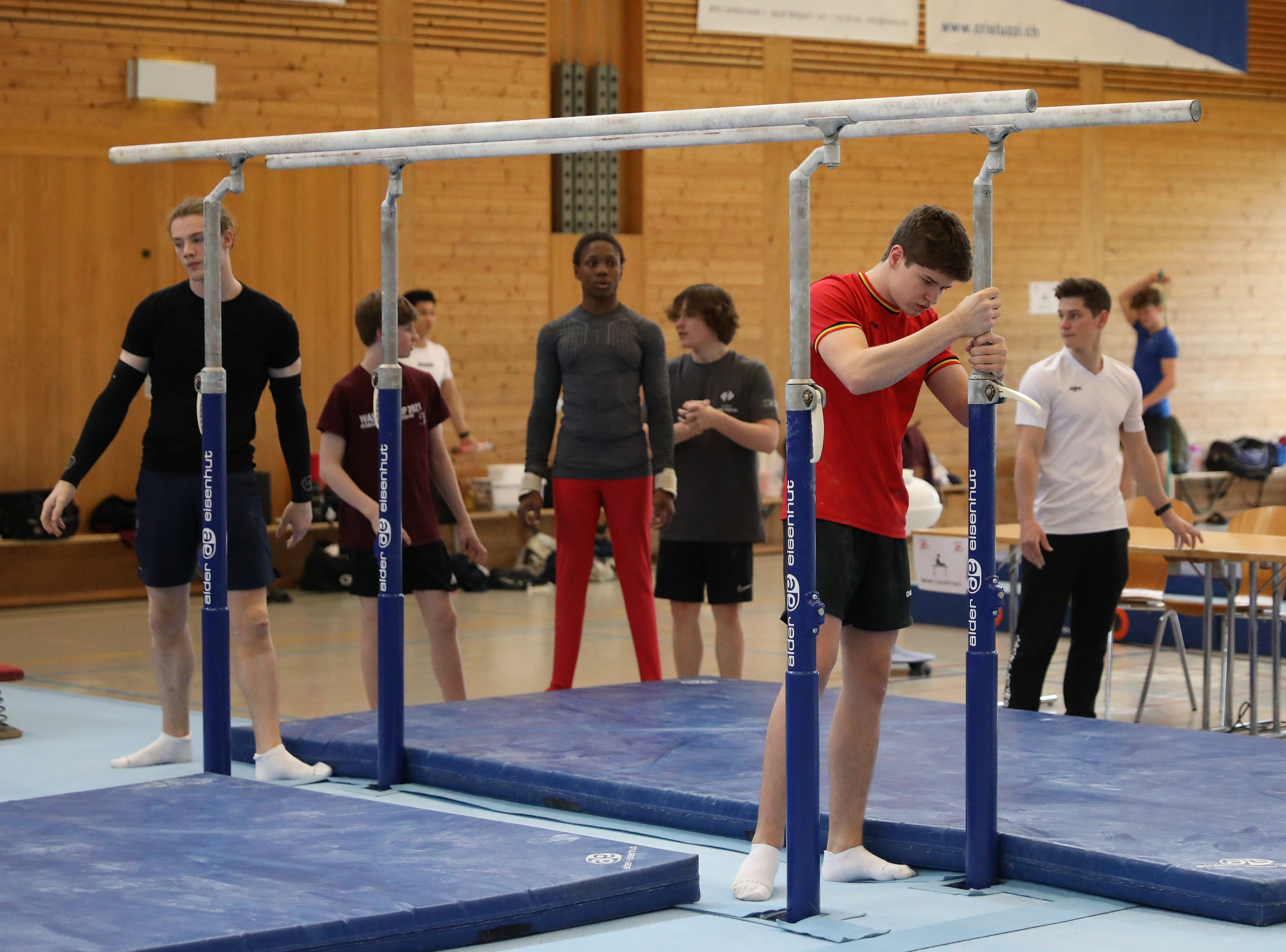
Preparation of the parallel bars during podium training by Team Belgium

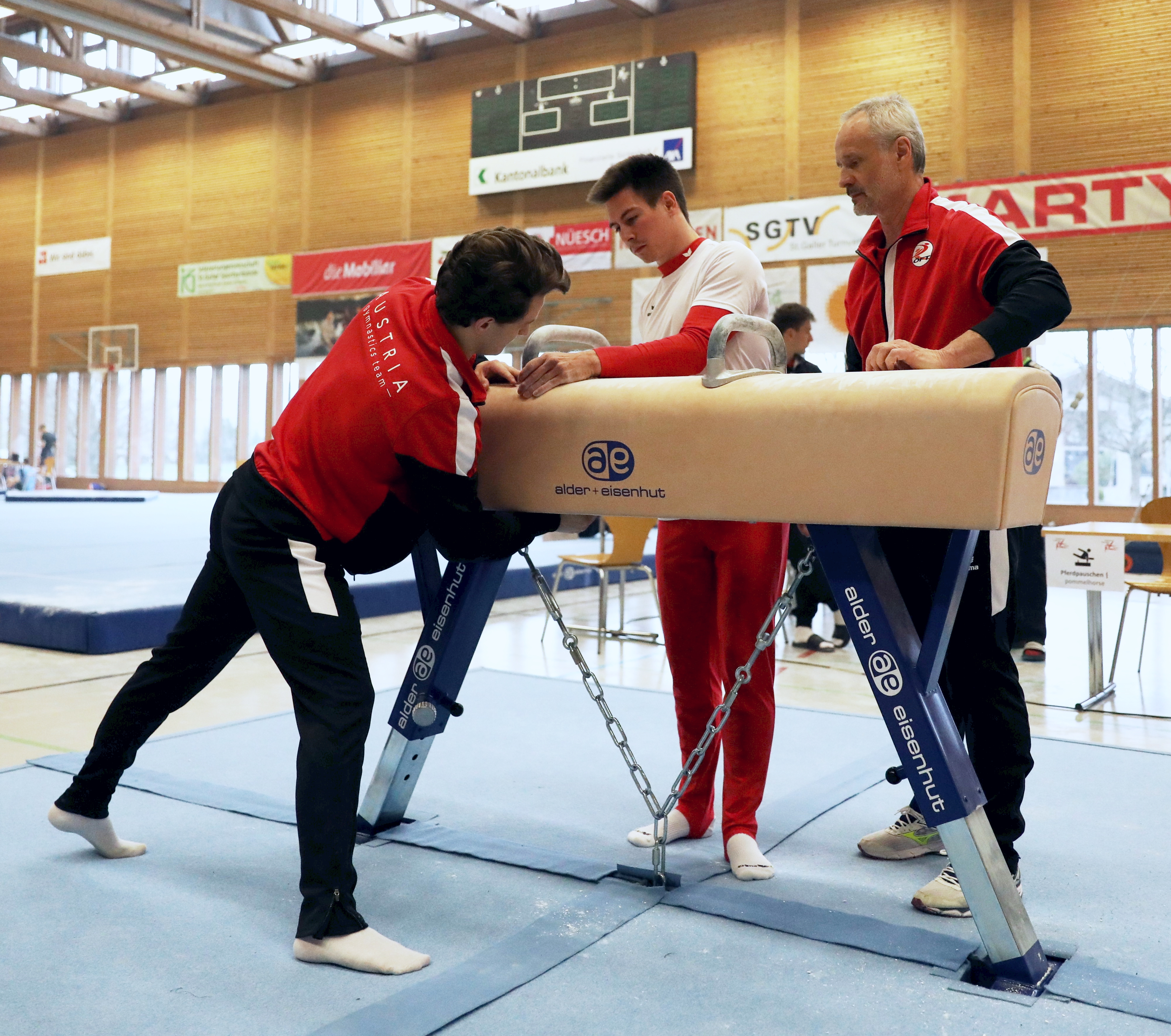
Setup of the pommel horse by Team Austria

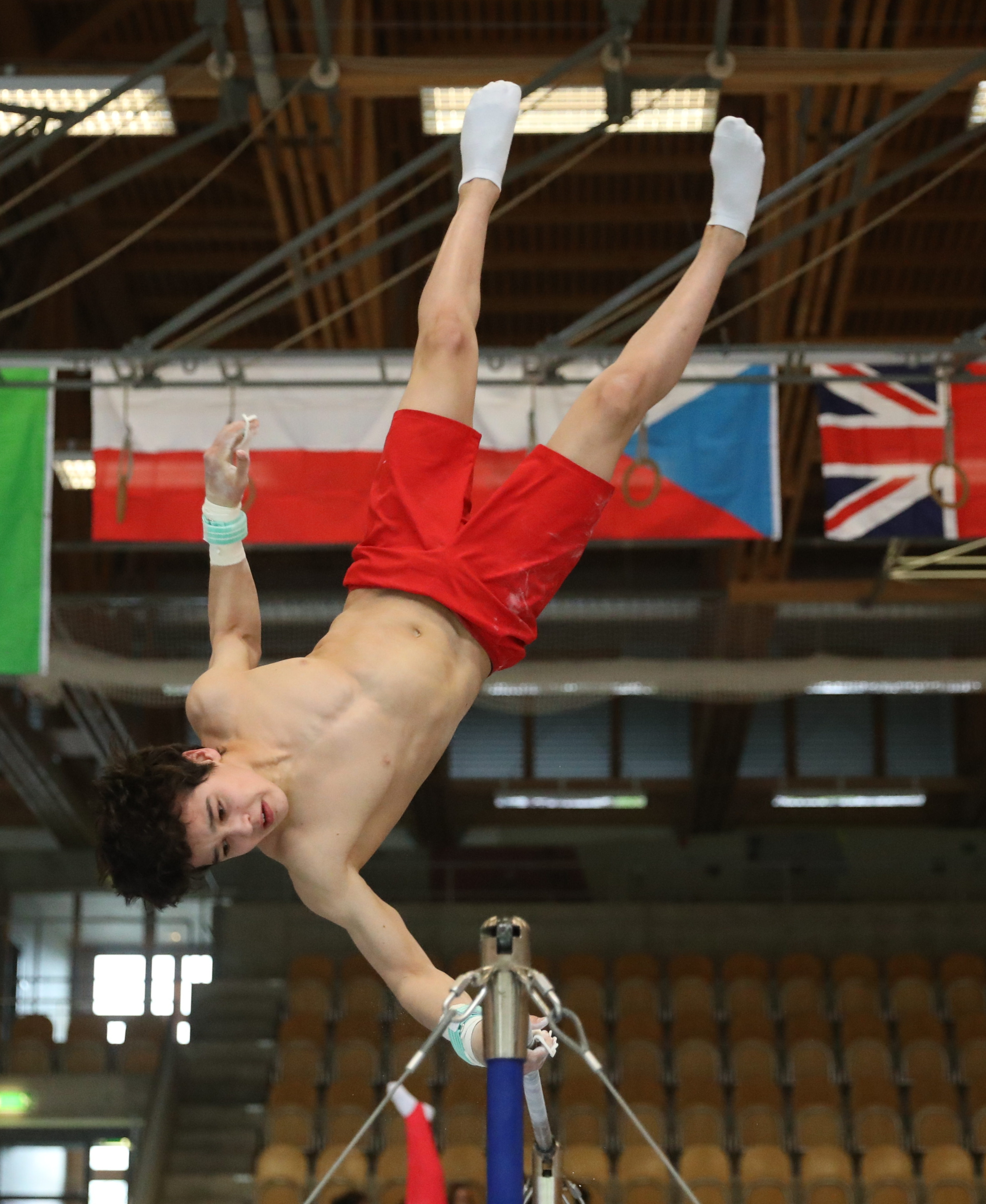
Gymnasts from Germany training on the horizontal bar

=== Saturday: International competition ===
The international competition consists of several parts: an all-around for juniors, an all-around for seniors and an apparatus or team final. Since 2015, the two all-around competitions with open freestyle exercises have been taking place in accordance with the rules of the International Gymnastics Federation (Swiss program 6). The difficulty and execution of the exercises will be judged by a panel of judges composed of members of the participating nations according to the international Code of Points. In previous years, the juniors could compete in the Swiss program 5, which includes compulsory and bonus elements and is evaluated accordingly. If a large number of gymnasts are registered for the all-around competitions, the competitions can take place in several subdivisions. There is no obligation to participate on all devices. The winner of the all-around is the person with the highest number of points of all participants, and the cantonal champion for St. Gallen in program 6 is also determined. The following countries have taken part in the international competitions so far: Belgium, Bulgaria, Costa Rica, Germany, England, France, Italy, Japan, Croatia, Luxembourg, Monaco, the Netherlands, Switzerland, Austria, Poland, Portugal, Russia, the Czech Republic and Hungary. At the same time, there is a competition in the open program in which Swiss amateur gymnasts compete. Here only the four best gymnastics devices are judged and the winner is awarded separately.

The all-around competitions at the Rheintalcup serve the Swiss gymnasts as qualifying competitions for their national championships. Occasionally, official qualifications for national and international competitions in the junior and senior sections also take place at the Rheintalcup. For example, the qualification for the Junior and Senior European Championships 2014 and the qualification for the European Olympic Youth Festival in the same year were held there for the Swiss gymnasts. The Rheintalcup in 2022 was officially recognized as a qualifying competition for the Universiade.

In the evening after the all-around competitions, an apparatus final in the junior and senior sections on the three apparatuses floor, parallel bars and horizontal bar take place. Occasionally, as at the 25th Rheintalcup, team finals of the best participating nations take place, in which a junior and a senior gymnast have to collect points together on the same apparatus in order to determine the winning country.

In the context of the international competition, there are often other activities such as a sponsored aperitif or a raffle.

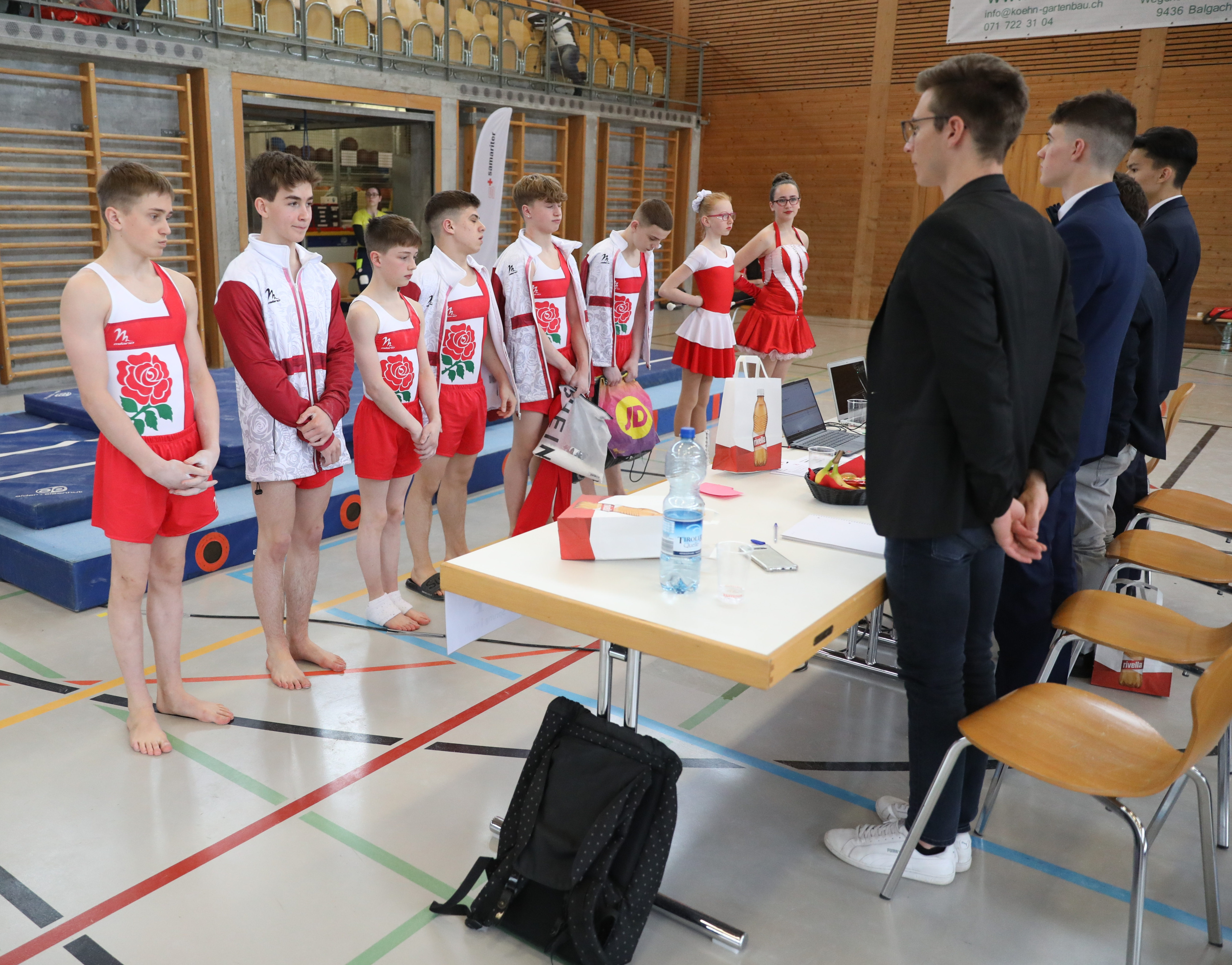
Team England lineup in front of the judges before the exercises

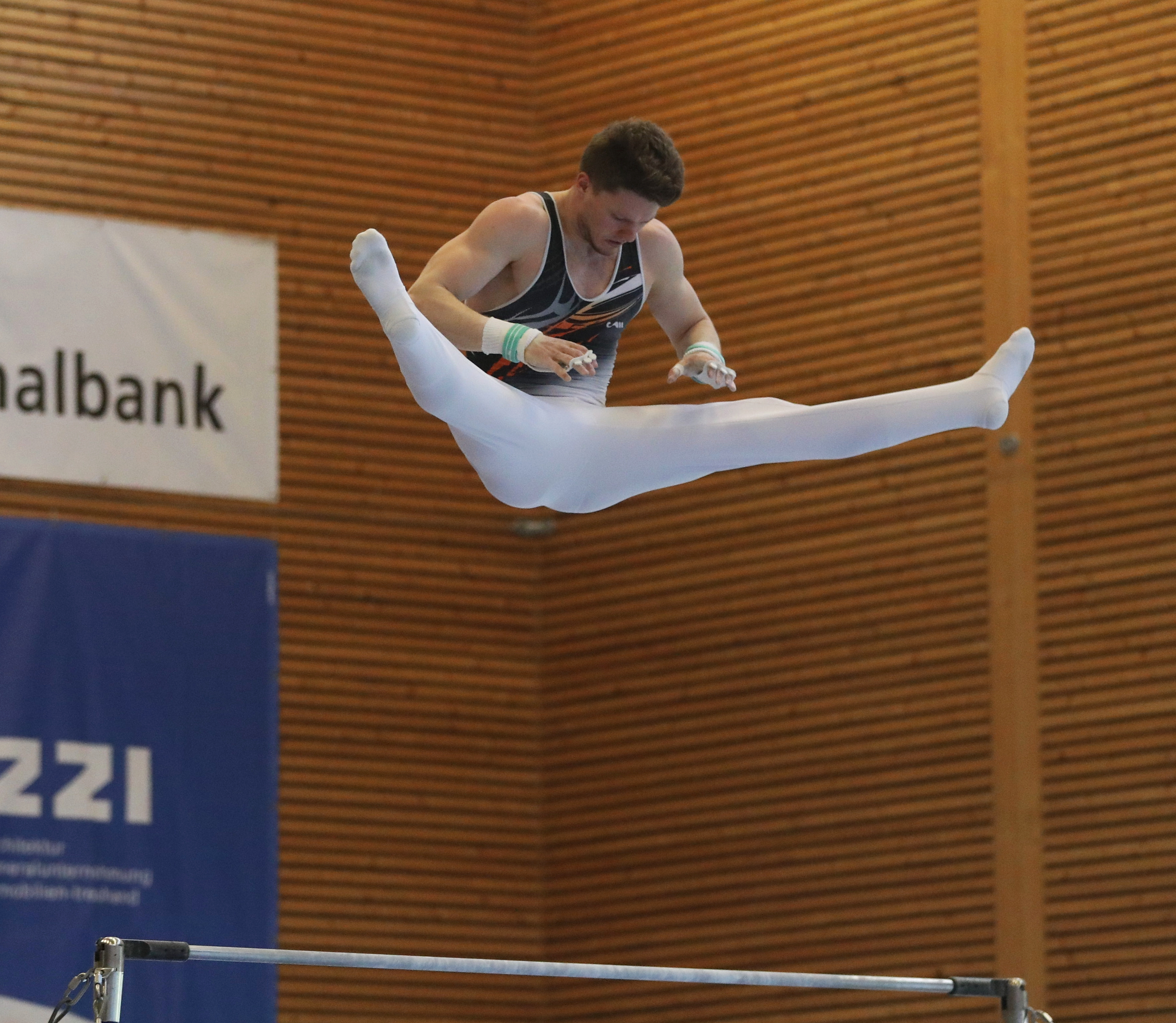
Marco Pfyl, winner of the 2022 seniors’ all-around, doing the Tkatchev straddle on the horizontal bar

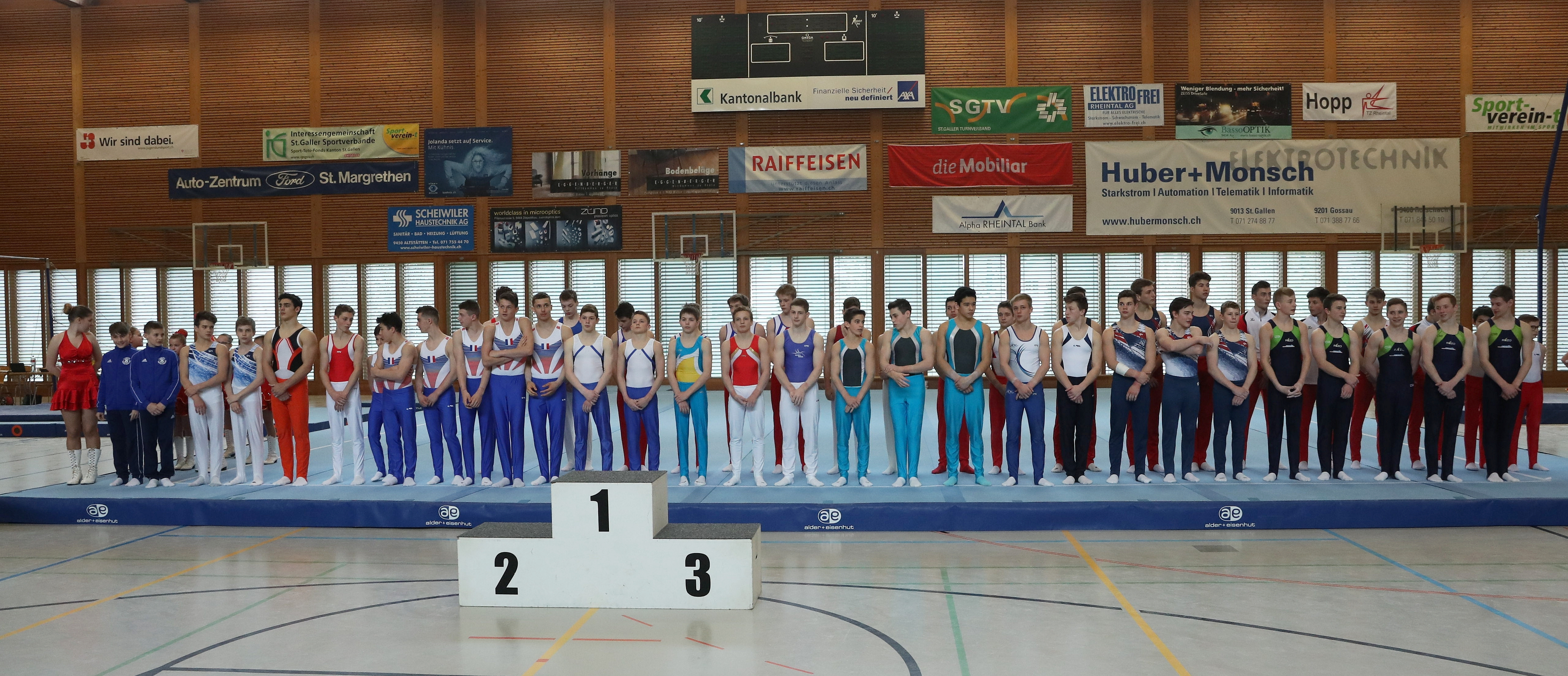
Line-up of the juniors at the 2019 all-around victory ceremony

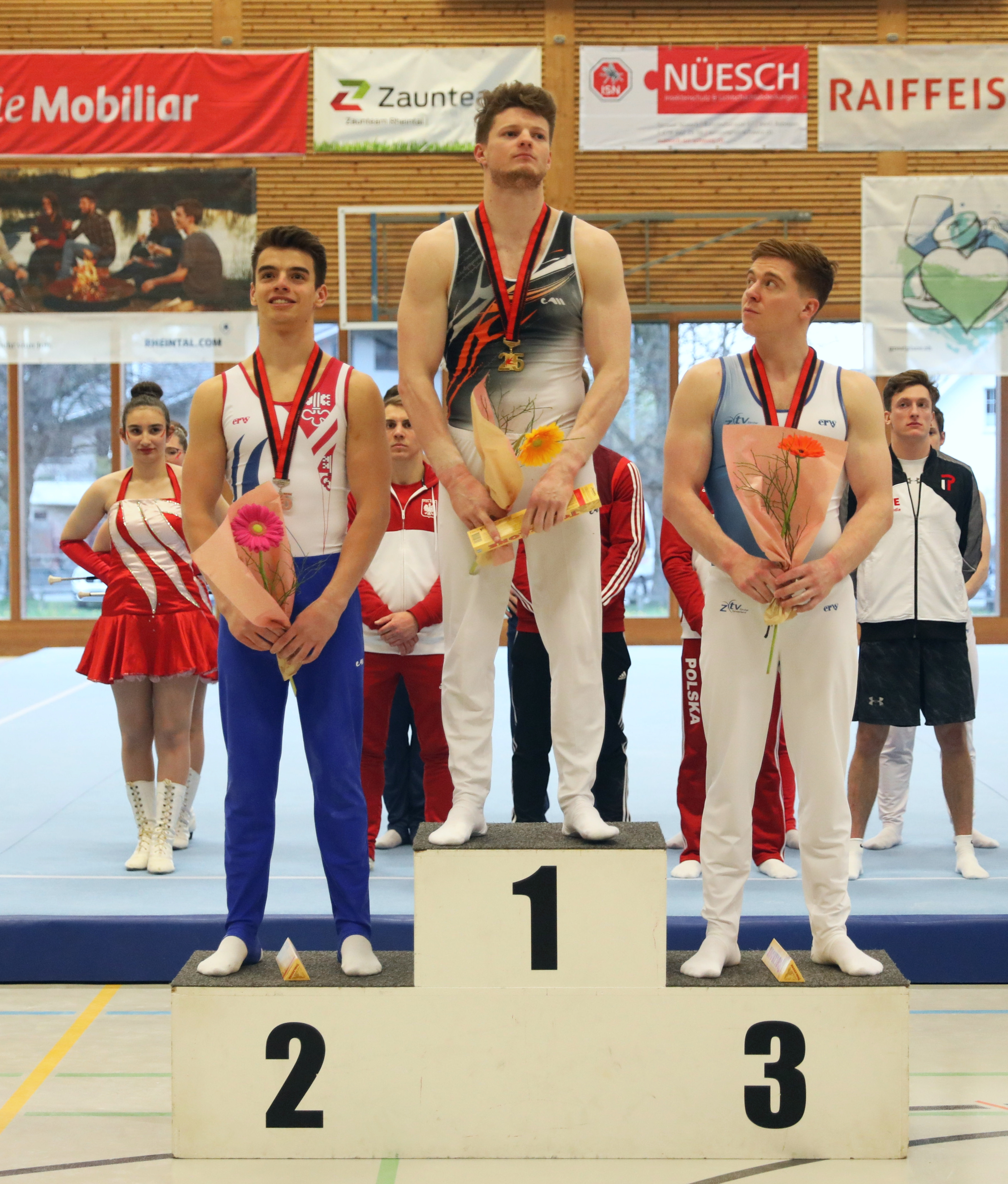
Senior podium at the 2022 all-around victory ceremony: Marco Pfyl (gold), Dominic Tamsel (silver), Moreno Kratter (bronze)

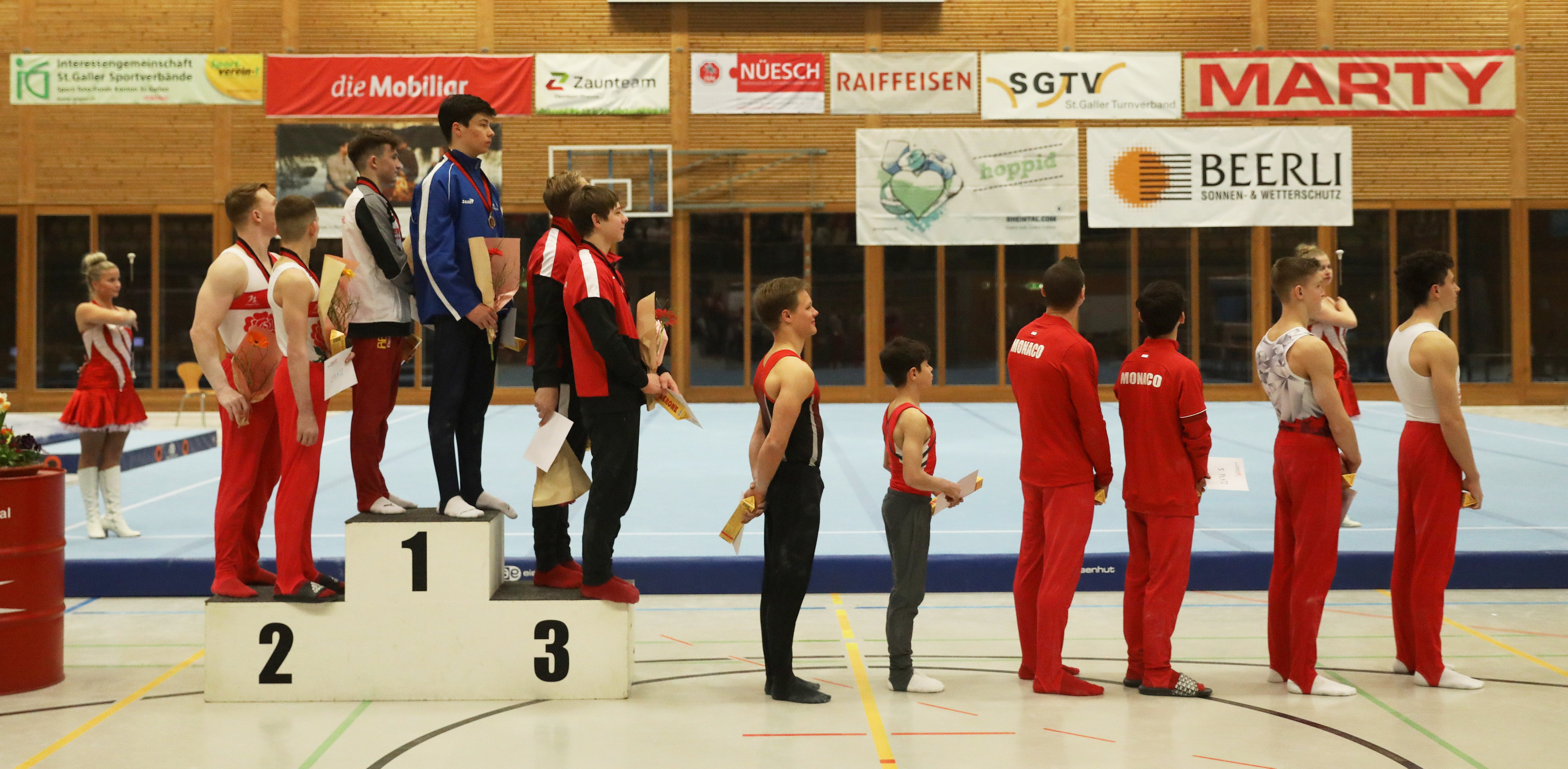
Victory ceremony in the team finals during the national anthem

=== Sunday: Ostschweizer Cup ===
After a modification of the hall for younger gymnasts, competitions in the Swiss categories introductory program to program 4 take place on Sunday exclusively for Swiss junior gymnasts aged six to 13 years. Since these competitions are part of the Ostschweizer Cup (Eastern Swiss Cup), gymnasts mainly from these regions take part. In addition to the organizing TZ Rheintal, this also includes the gymnastics centers in Fürstenland and Graubünden, the Turnfabrik (gymnatics factury) in the canton of Thurgau and, from program 3 on, the Regionales Leistungszentrum Ost (Regional Performance Center East) in Wil. In addition to the gymnasts from Eastern Switzerland, juniors from other regions, for example from the cantons of Aargau, Schaffhausen and Zurich, also take part. The competitions within the Ostschweizer Cup serve as qualification competitions for the Swiss Junior Championships and as a cantonal championship in St. Gallen.

The competitions are also held as all-arounds. In some cases, programs are combined in one run if the number of participants is low. The six Olympic apparatuses are adapted for the younger gymnasts in each program. This includes the modification of jumping tracks with mini-trampolines instead of springboards, smaller parallel bars and additions to the regular pommel horse with two pommels such as a gymnastic mushroom without or with a pommel, horses on the ground or horses without pommels. A panel of judges composed of the participating clubs evaluates compulsory and bonus elements according to the Swiss adaptations of the international Code of Points for these programs. The winner of the all-around is the person with the highest number of points of all participants per program. In addition, the cantonal champion is awarded in the various programs.

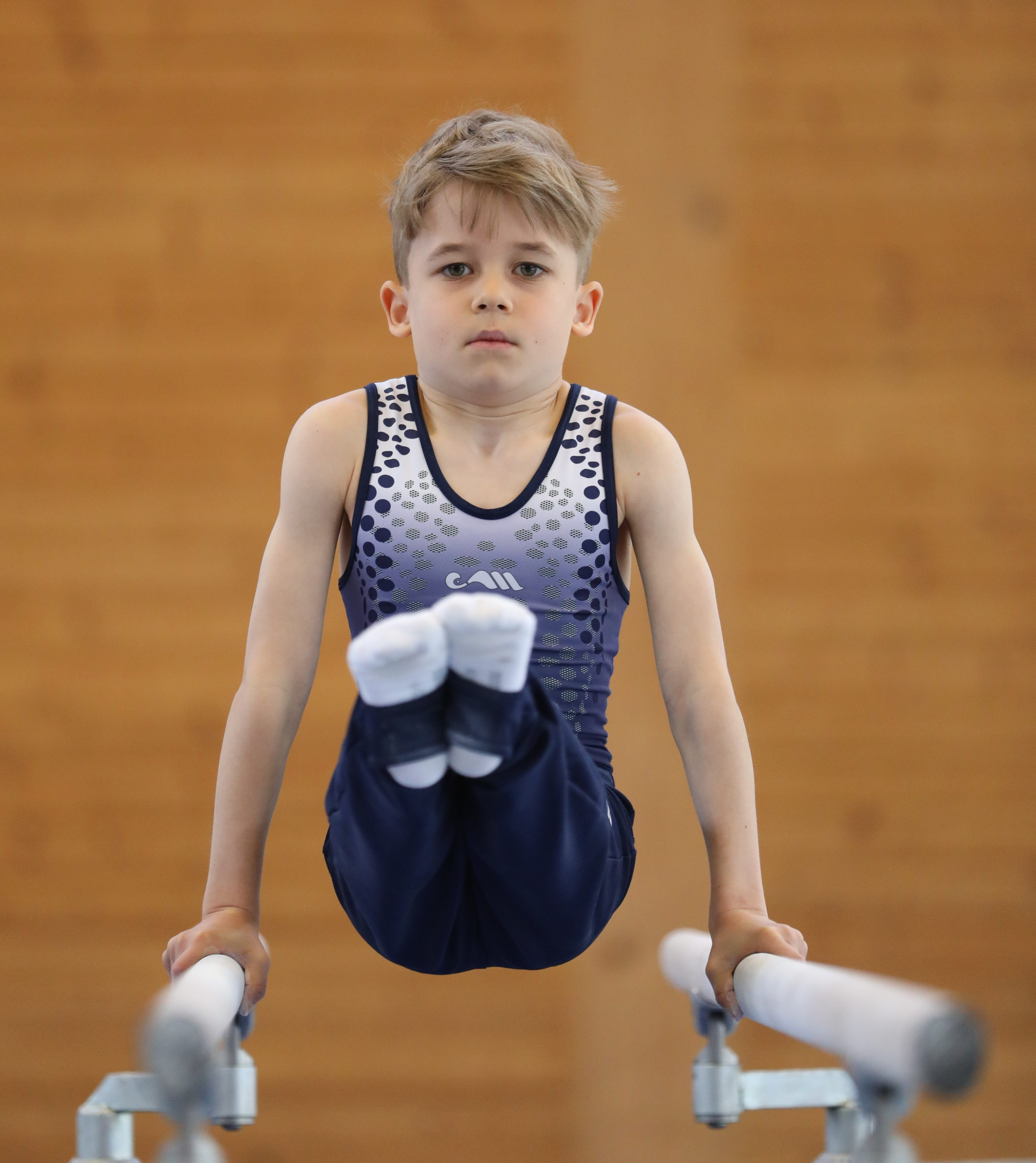
Gymnasts from the canton of Zurich in the introductory program on parallel bars

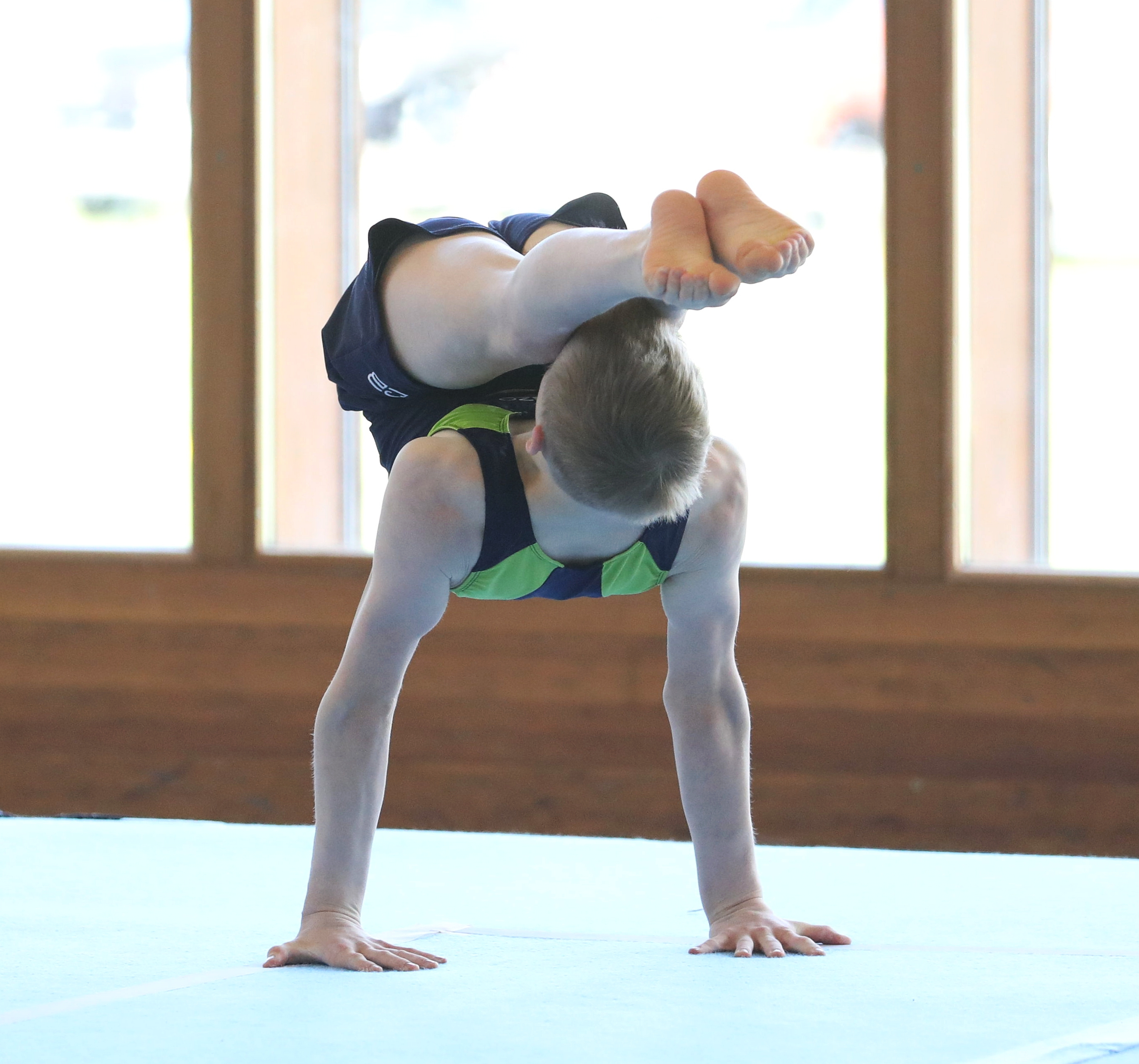
Gymnast from the Regionales Leistungszentrum Ost performs a V-sit with horizontal legs (so-called manna).

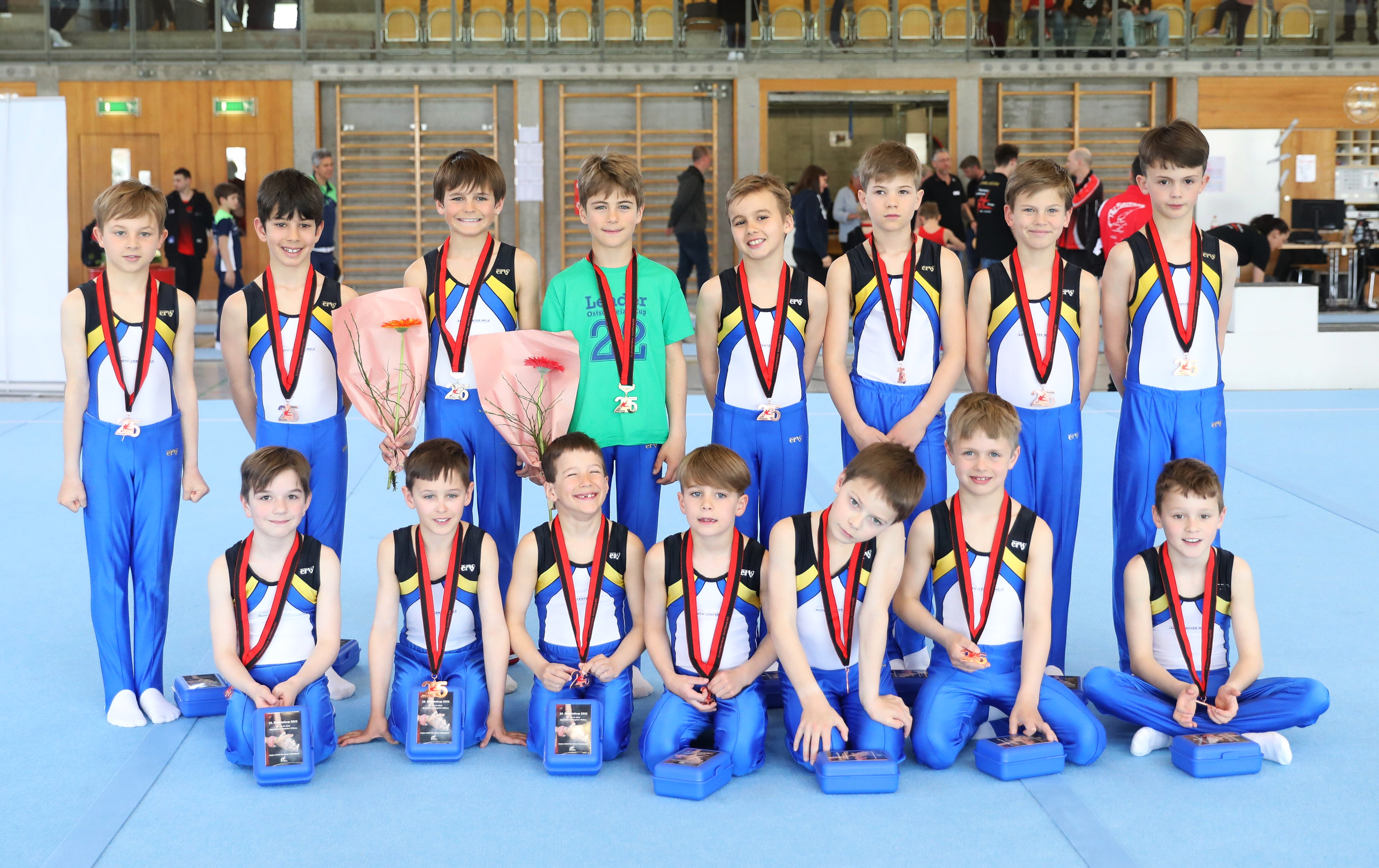
Team photo of Turnzentrum Graubünden (Grisons) in program 1

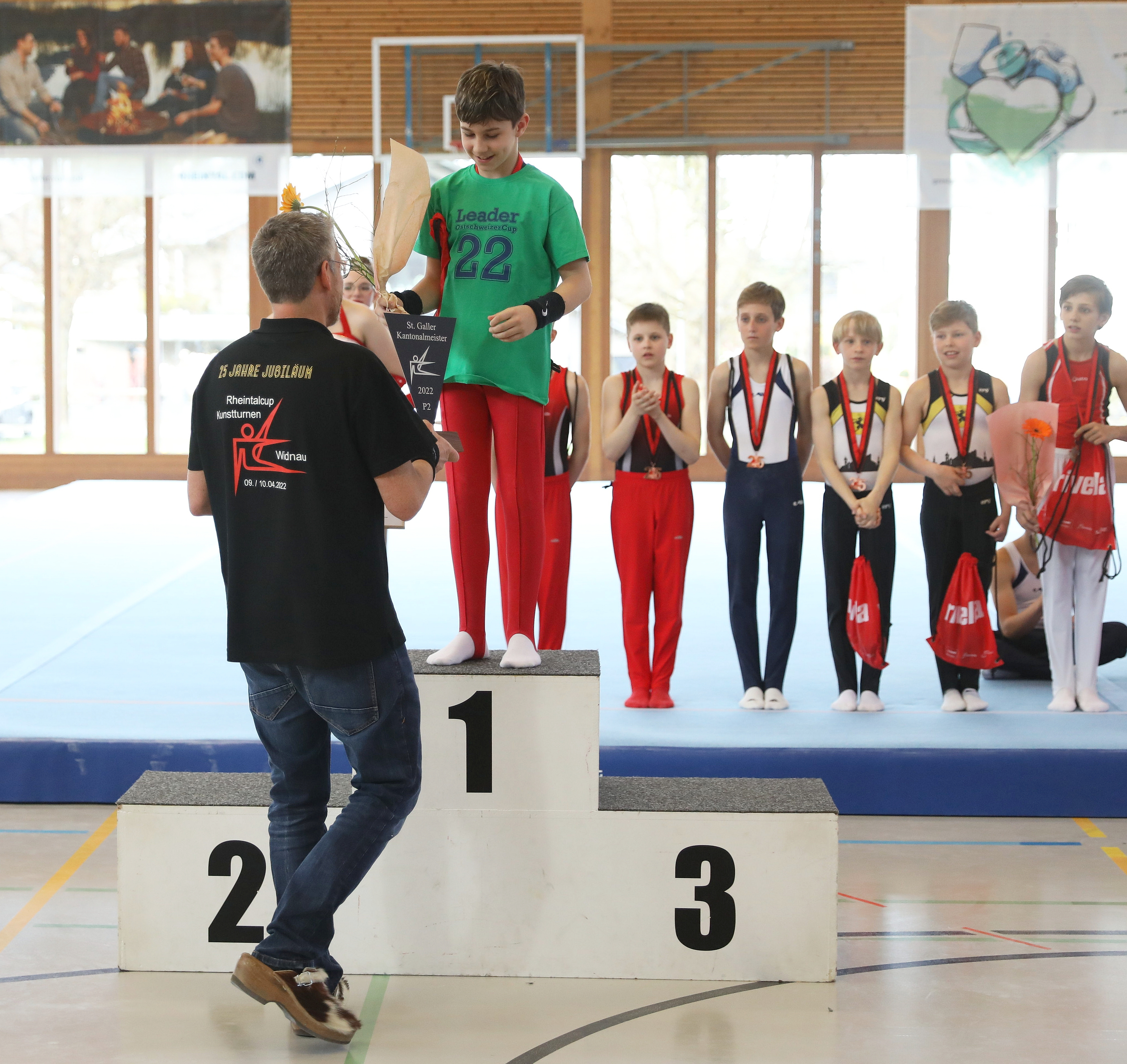
Victory ceremony for the cantonal champion in program 2 with a green jersey for the leader in the Ostschweizer Cup

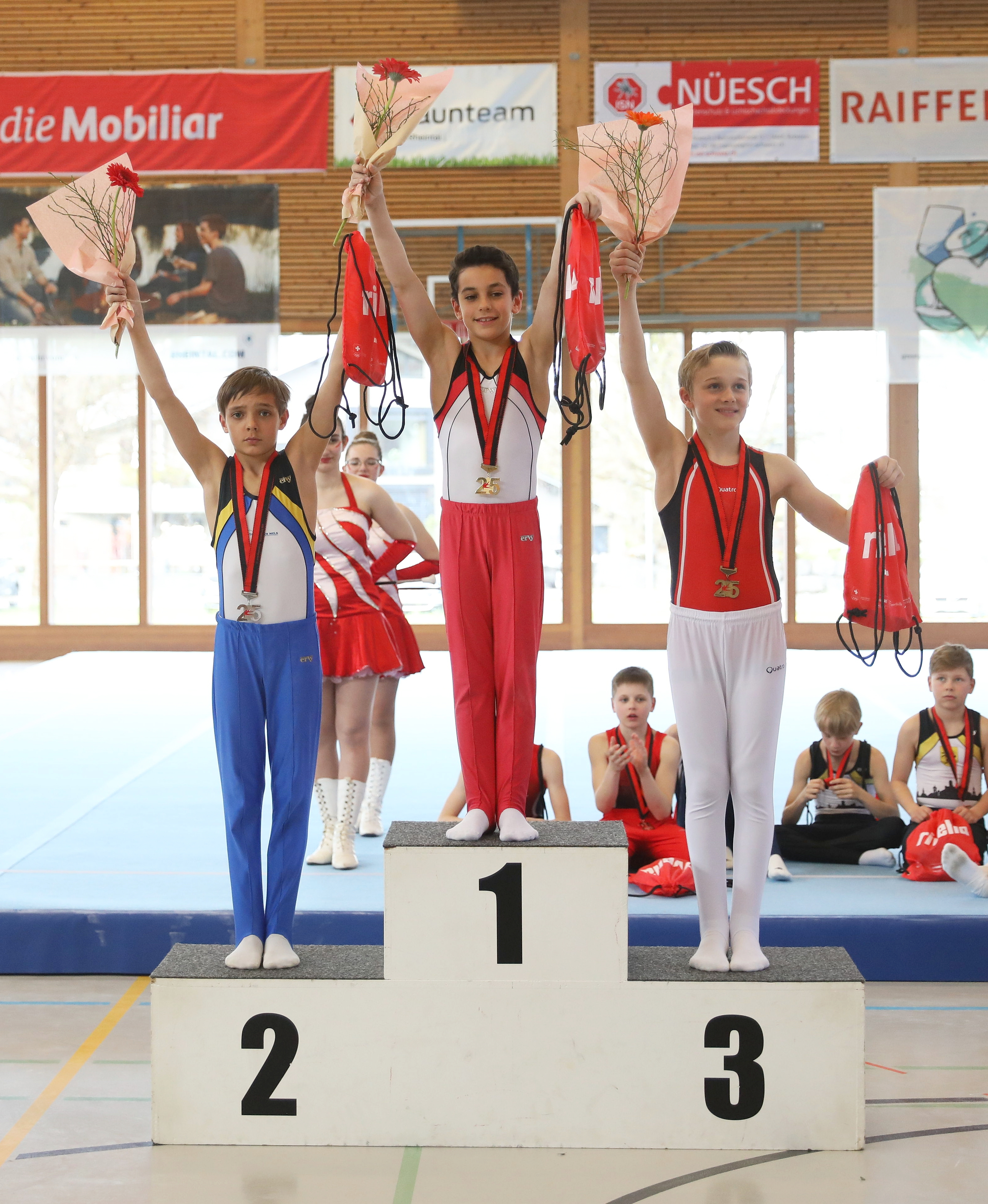
Victory ceremony in program 3 with gymnasts from the Turnzentrum Frauenfeld, Graubünden (Grisons) and the Thurgauer Turnfabrik

== Successful gymnasts at the Rheintalcup (selection) ==
Switzerland:

- Pablo Brägger
- Claudio Capelli
- Oliver Hegi
- Moreno Kratter
- Li Donghua
- Henji Mboyo
- Marco Pfyl
- Taha Serhani

International:

- Filip Boroša, Croatia
- Carlo Hörr, Germany
- Joshua Nathan, England
- Mario Rauscher, Austria
- Giarnni Regini-Moran, England
- Tin Srbić, Kroatien
- Nile Wilson, England

== Literature ==
- TZ Rheintal (ed.): Programmheft Rheintalcup 2022. 25 Jahre Jubiläum. self-publishing 2022 (available online).
