= Chur Rhine Valley =

Valley in the canton of Grisons, Switzerland

Coordinates: 46.977441°N 9.557247°E

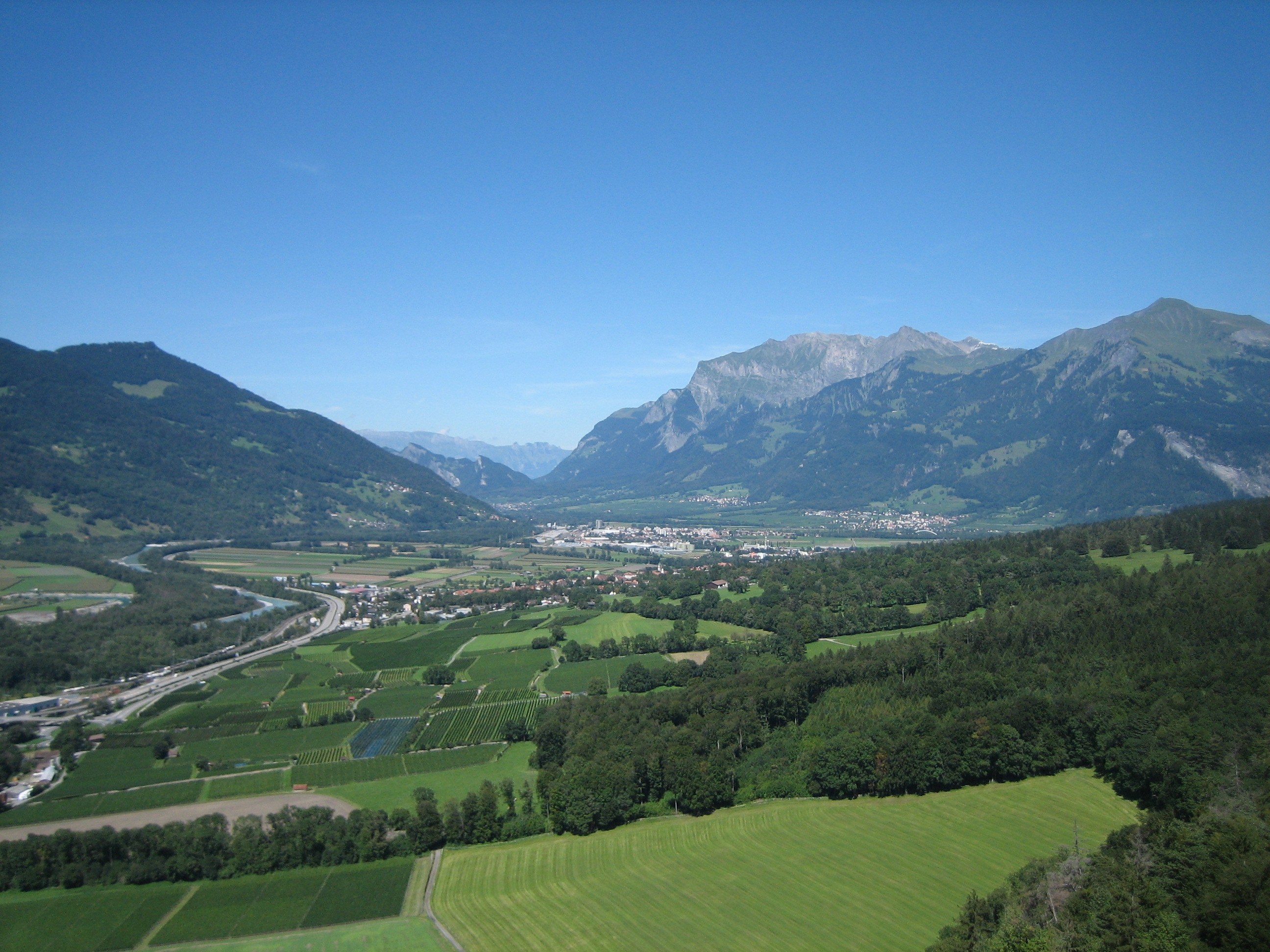
The Bündner Herrschaft in the north of the Chur Rhine Valley

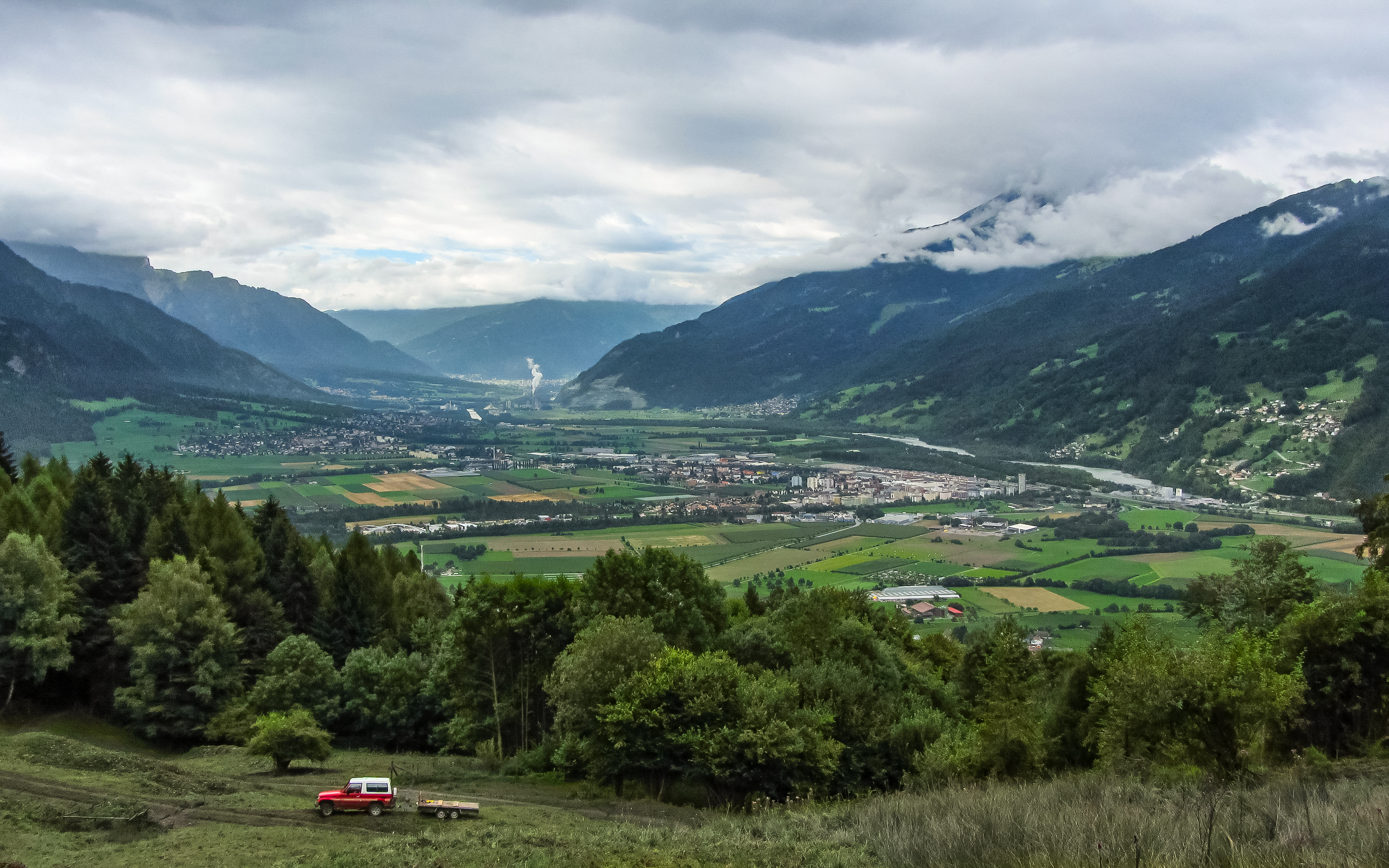
View of Chur Rhine Valley from a hayfield in Malans

The Chur Rhine Valley (German: Churer Rheintal, also commonly known as the Bündner Rheintal) is that part of Nordbünden through which the Rhine flows from the confluence of Anterior and Posterior Rhine near Reichenau to the cantonal border near Maienfeld and Fläsch. The plain of Bonaduz and Rhäzüns also belongs to the Chur Rhine Valley and forms its southern end. The valley is part of the Alpine Rhine natural landscape.

== Geographical features and divisions ==
The Chur Rhine Valley is divided into three sub-regions:

- the section from Reichenau to Chur, whose landscape is characterised by the tumas, isolated hillocks carried down during the great Flims rock avalanche 9400BP
- the area of the Five Villages
- the Bündner Herrschaft

Much of the right (east) side of the valley is dominated by a sequence of enormous conoidal debris fans, forming the Alpenrhein Cluster, one of the largest in the Alps after Vinschgau and Valtellina. There are first-tier 'alpine megafans' at Chur and Igis-Zizers, and second tier 'outsize fans' at Ems, Malans, Jenins, Maienfeld, Balzers and Mauren. Their anomalous scale from most but not all of the small side-catchments indicates largely catastrophic origins, after deglaciation. They now support rich farmland and vineyards, with scrub and forest where debris-flow activity continues.

== Climate ==
Climatically, the Chur Rhine Valley is one of the warmest and driest regions in the Canton of Grisons. It experiences föhn winds on a large number of days during the year.

== Language and population ==
Most of the population speak Bündner German (in Chur the variant of Chur German). In Rhäzüns and especially in Domat/Ems they also speak Romansh.

In recent years, the settlements of the Chur Rhine Valley have increasingly grown together into an urban region around the central town of Chur.

== Media ==
Regional daily newspapers in the area are the Bündner Tagblatt and Südostschweiz. In the Bündner Herrschaft, the local papers are the Prättigauer und Herrschäftler and in the southern part of the Bündner Rhine Valley, the Ruinaulta (called the Rhiiblatt until late 2013). The periodicals, Terra Grischuna and Rheinfluss, deal with the Chur Rhine Valley in terms of cultural and natural history.

== Panorama ==
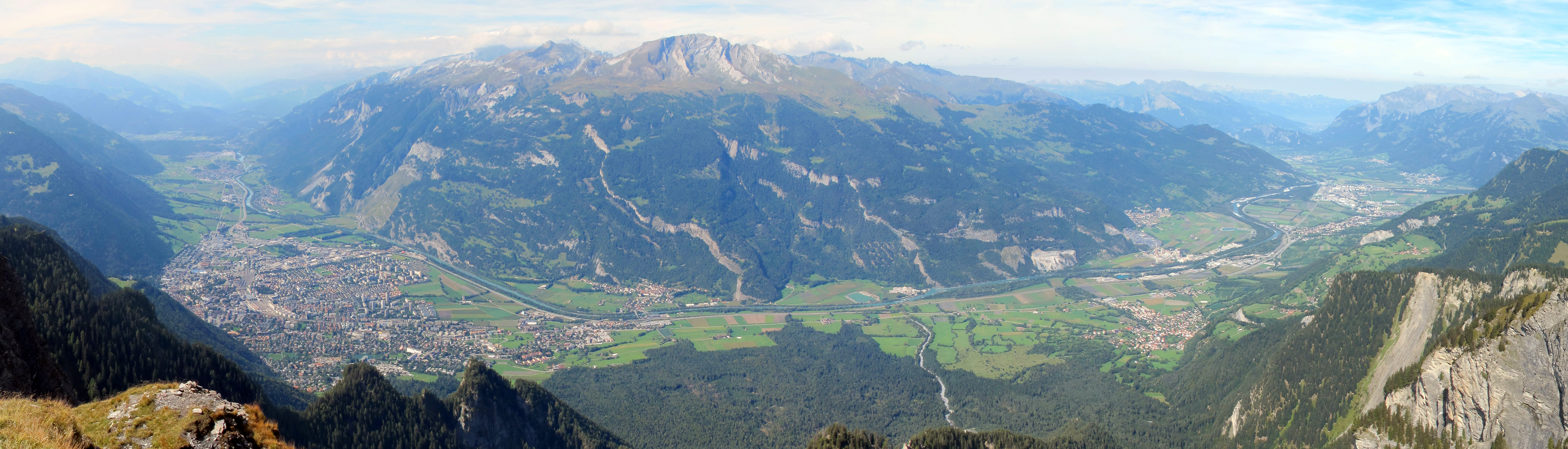
135° panorama of the Chur Rhine Valley from Montalin
