= Reinhard Dorn =

German architect

Reinhard Dorn (21 June 1934 – 28 June 1982) was a German architect, non-fiction writer and university lecturer.

== Life ==
Dorn was head of the Stadtkirchenbauamtes des Evangelisch-lutherischer Stadtkirchenverband Braunschweig from 1971 to 1980, before taking up a professorship at the Nuremberg University of Applied Sciences, now the Technische Hochschule Nürnberg. In 1982, he was dean of the faculty for architecture there. The "Entrance building and forecourt design of the main cemetery" designed by him was awarded the Peter-Joseph-Krahe-Prize of the city of Braunschweig on 6 December 1982.

In addition to his own reference books on architectural history, he also wrote several reviews in architectural journals, such as the 1981 review of Fritz von Osterhausen's work Georg Christoph Sturm - Leben und Werk des Braunschweiger Hofbaumeisters in the Zeitschrift für Kunstgeschichte.

Dorn died in Nuremberg at the age of 48.

== Publications ==
- Die Villa Salve Hospes in Braunschweig (Grosse Baudenkmäler. issue 235.) Deutscher Kunstverlag, Munich/ Berlin 1969.
- Peter Joseph Krahe:
  - Vol. 1: Studienjahre in Düsseldorf und Rom 1778–1786. Klinkhardt & Biermann, Braunschweig 1969.
  - Vol. 2: Bauten und Projekte in Düsseldorf, Koblenz, Hannover und Braunschweig 1787–1806. Klinkhardt & Biermann, Braunschweig 1971.
  - Vol. 3: Bauten und Projekte im Königreich Westfalen und im Herzogtum Braunschweig 1808–1837. Bearbeitet von Elisabeth Spitzbart. Deutscher Kunstverlag, Munich/ Berlin 1999, ISBN 3-422-06189-4.
- St. Andreas in Braunschweig (Grosse Baudenkmäler. Issue 277.) Deutscher Kunstverlag, Munich 1974, OCLC 636622946
- Mittelalterliche Kirchen in Braunschweig. Niemeyer, Hameln 1978, ISBN 3-8271-9043-6.
