= Johann Gottfried Tulla =

German civil engineer responsible for the straightening of the Rhine

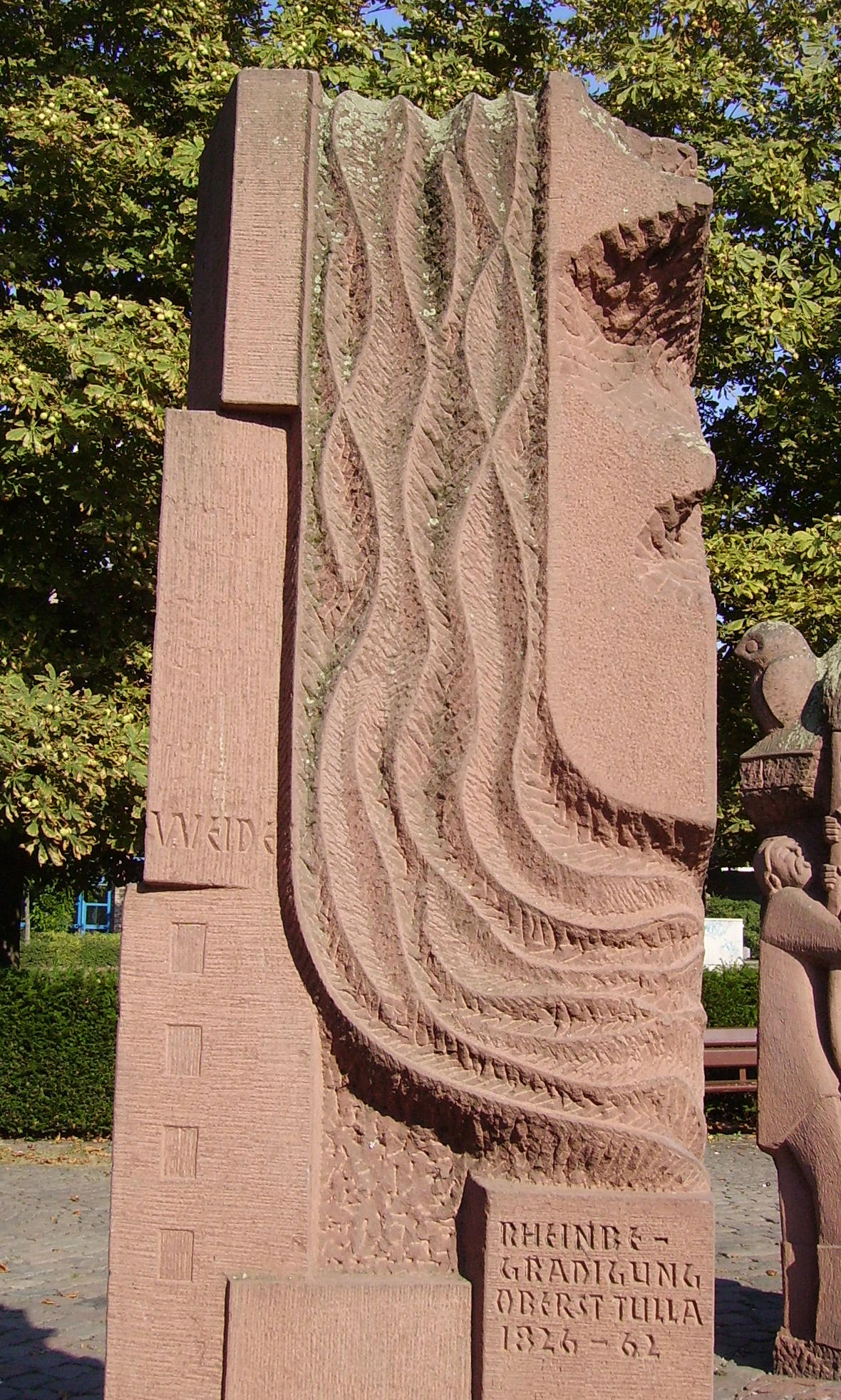
Monument to Tulla and the Rhine correction

Johann Gottfried Tulla (20 March 1770, in Karlsruhe – 27 March 1828, in Paris) was a German engineer who accomplished the straightening of the Rhine, improving navigation and alleviating the effects of flooding. His measures gave the Upper Rhine a completely new appearance. The river was deepened and channelled between embankments which narrowed the channels to a width of 200 to 250 m (660 to 820 ft); new sections were dug to straighten out its meandering course, and numerous small islands were removed. The effect was to reduce the river's length between Basel and Worms from 355 to 275 km (221 to 171 mi).

However, the straightening of the Upper Rhine had increased the streaming speed and thus permanently raised the flood risk in the regions of the Middle and the Lower Rhine, partial floodplain restoration is still performed in a joint program of Germany and France.

== Career ==
Tulla began his training in 1792 with Karl Christian von Langsdorf. From 1794 to 1796 he traveled across Central Europe and to Scandinavia, studying hydraulic projects. During his travels, in 1795 he studied chemistry and mineralogy at the Mining Academy in Freiberg, Saxony. Subsequently, he was transferred to government service in the Grand Duchy of Baden. Further training in Paris followed in 1801, but he was called back to Karlsruhe after a year. There he was appointed to the rank of captain in 1803. Starting in 1807 he worked in Switzerland on the channelling of the Linth river. Also in 1807 he was one of the founders of the school of engineering that was the predecessor of the University of Karlsruhe. He was promoted several times in subsequent years, in 1809 to major and in 1814 to lieutenant colonel. In 1817 he was appointed director of the Oberdirektion des Wasser- und Straßenbaues (Directorate of Water and Road Construction). In this office he was highest in rank for the Rhine river correction program to straighten the river and reduce flooding. This huge river engineering project continued until 1879, long after his death. His appointment as an officer of the French Légion d'honneur followed in 1827.

Tulla died of the consequences of malaria in 1828 and was buried in the Montmartre Cemetery in Paris. His gravestone shows the "Altrip corner," one of the technically most difficult sections of the Rhine straightening, near the village of Altrip in the Palatinate.
