= Langsdorff =

Langsdorff may refer to:

People

- Georg von Langsdorff AKA Grigori Ivanovich Langsdorf (1774–1852), German-Russian naturalist, explorer, and physician, and Russian diplomat
- Hans Langsdorff (1894–1939), German naval officer, commanding officer of Admiral Graf Spee in the Battle of the River Plate
- Karl Christian von Langsdorf (1757–1834), German mathematician, geologist, natural scientist, and engineer

Other

- Langsdorff's toucanet, an alternative name for the golden-collared toucanet
