= Friedrich Prym =

German mathematician (1841–1915)

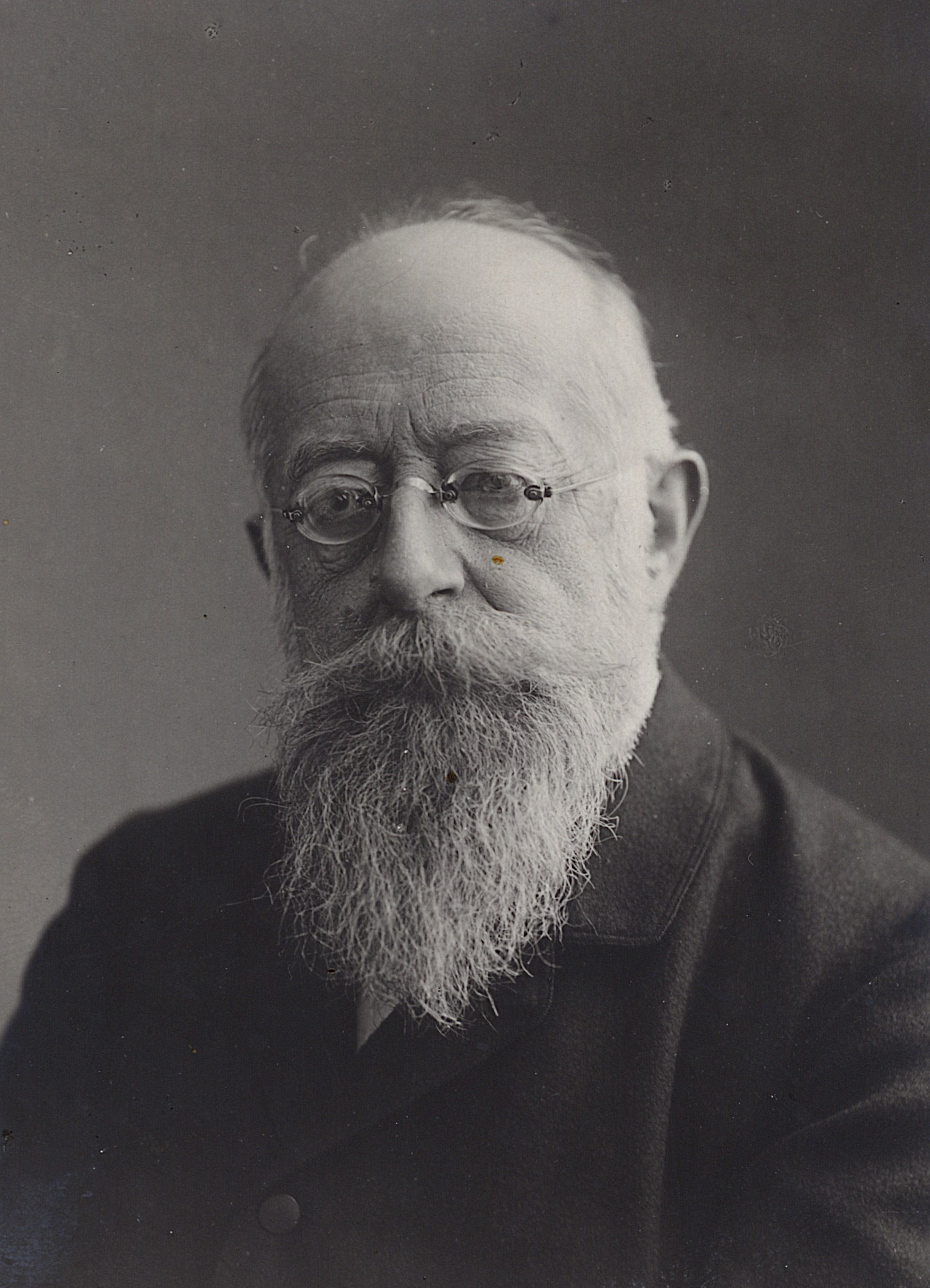
Friedrich Prym in 1909

Friedrich Emil Fritz Prym (28 September 1841, Düren – 15 December 1915, Bonn) was a German mathematician who introduced Prym varieties and Prym differentials.

Prym completed his Ph.D. at the University of Berlin in 1863 with a thesis written under the direction of Ernst Kummer and Martin Ohm. In 1867 he started a Professor at the University of Würzburg, where he later became Dean, and then Rector in 1897–98.
