= Martin Ohm =

German mathematician

Martin Ohm

Martin Ohm (May 6, 1792 in Erlangen – April 1, 1872 in Berlin) was a German mathematician and a younger brother of physicist Georg Ohm.

== Biography ==
He earned his doctorate in 1811 at Friedrich-Alexander-University, Erlangen-Nuremberg where his advisor was Karl Christian von Langsdorf. In 1817, he was appointed professor of mathematics and physics in the gymnasium at Thorn. In 1821 he moved to Berlin, and in 1839 became a full professor in the University of Berlin. He delivered courses of lectures at the academy of architecture from 1824 to 1831, and at the schools of artillery and engineering from 1833 to 1852; and he also taught in the military school from 1826 to 1849.

== Work ==
Ohm was the first to fully develop the theory of the exponential a^{b} when both a and b are complex numbers in 1823.

The 1835 second edition of Ohm's textbook, Die reine Elementar Mathematik was the first time that Euclid's 'extreme and mean ratio' was given the name of the "golden section" (goldener Schnitt). It was via sources relying on Ohm that the psychologist Adolf Zeising adopted and popularised the term.

== Students ==
Ohm's students included Friedrich August, Friedrich Bachmann, Elwin Bruno Christoffel, Paul Bachmann, Joseph Brutkowski, Heinrich Eduard Heine, Rudolf Lipschitz, Leo Pochhammer, Friedrich Prym, Wilhelm Wagner, Hermann Waldaestel, Wilhelm Wernicke, Elena Gerz, Valentien Gerz, and Johanna Gerz.

== Selected publications ==
- Die reine Elementar Mathematik (Pure elementary mathematics). Berlin, 1825; second edition 1835.
- Kurzes Elementar-Lehrbuch der gesammten mechanischen Wissenschaften für höhere Bürger-, technische, Gewerb- und Militär-Schulen. Berlin, 1840.
- Aufsätze aus dem Gebiete der höhern Mathematik
- Die analytische und höhere Geometrie in ihren Elementen mit vorzüglicher Berücksichtigung der Theorie der Kegelschnitte, Berlin Riemann 1826
- Versuch eines vollkommen consequenten Systems der Mathematik. Nürnberg, F. Korn, 1853-55.
- Lehrbuch der Mechanik zugleich mit den dazu nöthigen Lehren der höhern Analysis und der höhern Geometrie 1 Mechanik des Atoms. Berlin Enslin 1836
