= Rikitaro Fujisawa =

Japanese mathematician (1861–1933)

- 藤沢 利喜太郎
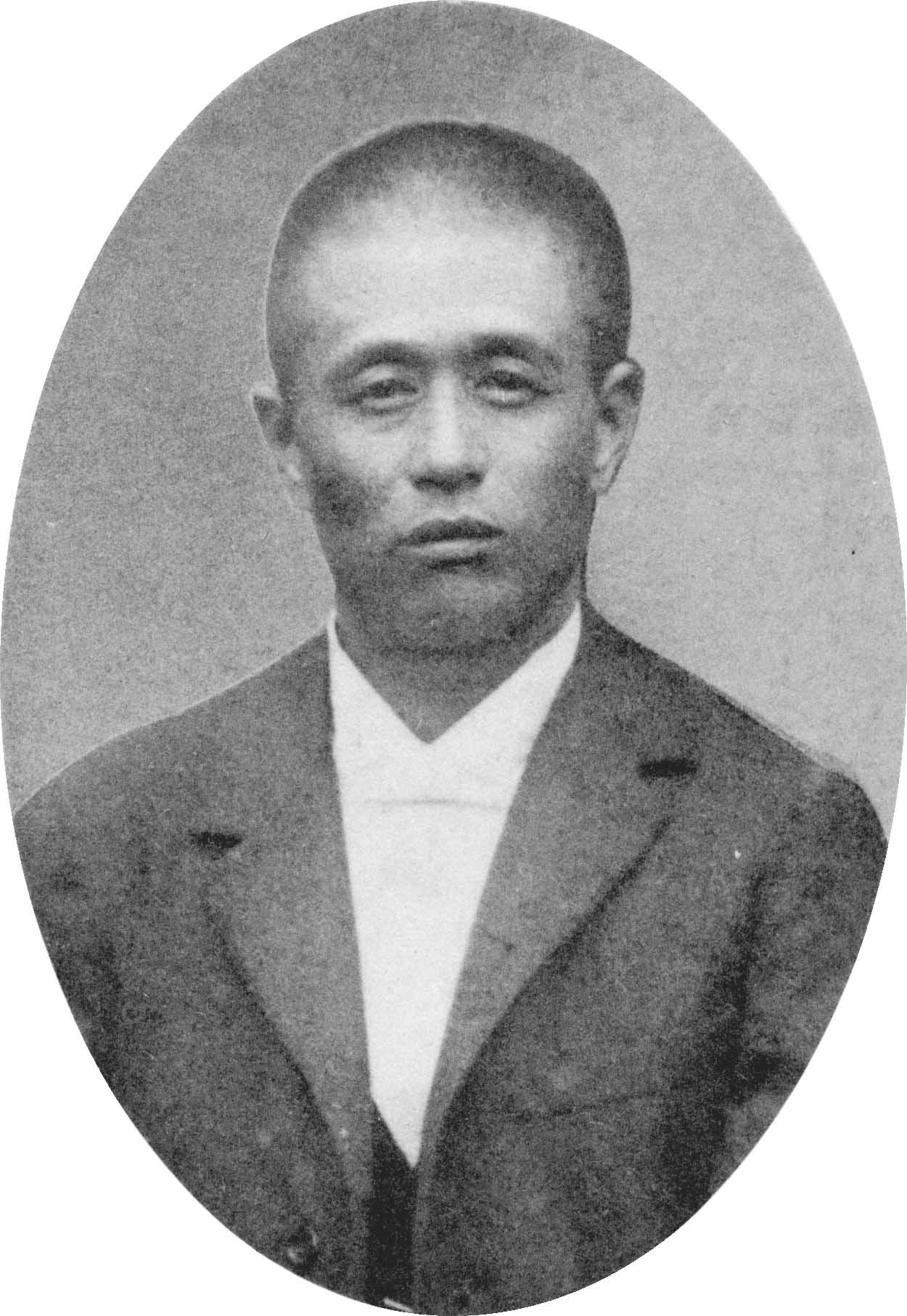
- Fujisawa in 1922

Member of the House of Peers
- In office 10 October 1925 – 23 December 1933 Nominated by the Emperor

Personal details
- Born: 12 October 1861 Sado Province, Japan
- Died: 23 December 1933 (aged 72)
- Education: Tokyo Imperial University; University of London; FWU Berlin; University of Strasbourg

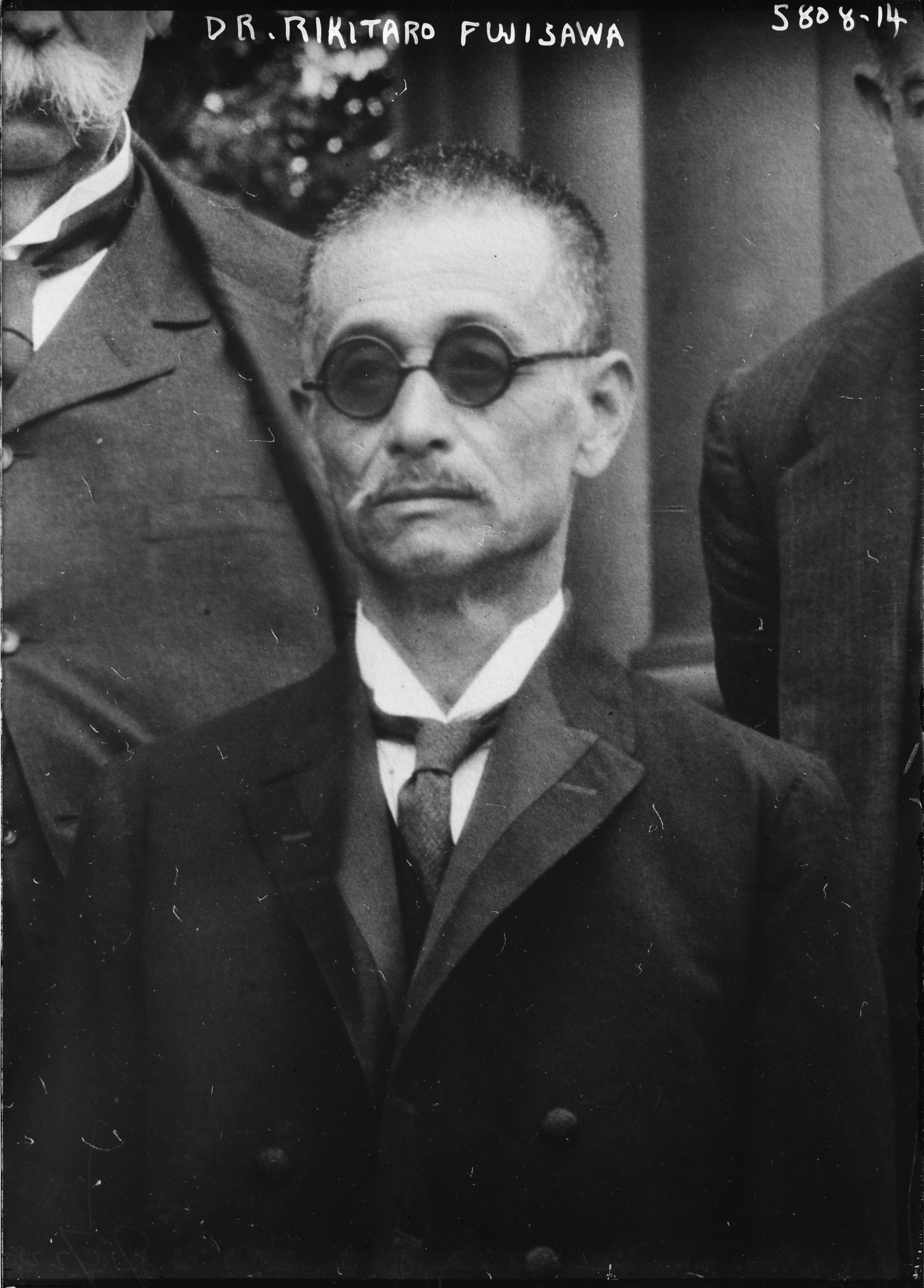
Fujisawa in 1922

Rikitarō Fujisawa (Japanese: 藤沢 利喜太郎, Fujisawa Rikitarō; 12 October 1861 – 23 December 1933) was a Japanese mathematician. During the Meiji era he was instrumental in reforming mathematics education in Japan and establishing the ideas of European mathematics in Japan.

== Biography ==
Born in Sado Province as the eldest son of Oyano Fujisawa, vassal of the shōgun, Rikitarō Fujisawa graduated in 1882 from the Faculty of Sciences of the University of Tokyo. From 1883 to 1887 he studied mathematics in Europe. After study at the University of London and the Humboldt University of Berlin, he studied at the University of Strasbourg (then a part of Germany) and in 1886 attained his doctorate with a dissertation on partial differential equations under the direction of Elwin Christoffel. In 1887 Fujisawa was appointed the second titular professor of mathematics at the University of Tokyo.

He was Japan's delegate to the Second International Conference on Mathematics, Paris, 1900, and also to the International Commission on the Teaching of Mathematics, 1910. Although a mathematician by training, Dr. Fujisawa has written many articles on international politics.

Fujisawa, who himself attended the seminary of Theodor Reye in Strasbourg, introduced the institution of the research seminary based on the German model early on. He was a teacher and mentor of several Japanese mathematicians who gained international reputations. His most famous student was Teiji Takagi. In 1921, Fujisawa retired from the University of Tokyo and, beginning in 1925, was twice appointed to the Japanese House of Peers but died in the early part of his second term.

Two of his sons achieved prominence in Japanese society. One of his brothers, Iwao Fujisawa, was a rear admiral in the Imperial Japanese Navy.

== Selected publications ==
- Ueber eine in der Wärmeleitungstheorie auftretende, nach den Wurzeln einer transcendenten Gleichung fortschreitende unendliche Reihe. Strassburg. 1886.
- Seimei hokenron. 1889. (theory of life insurance)
- Fujisawa, Rikitaro (1888). "Note on a new formula in spherical harmonics". Tokyo Sugaku-Butsurigaku Kwai Kiji. 4 (1): 7–8. doi:10.11429/subutsukiji1885b.4.7.
- Researches on the multiplication of elliptic functions. 1893.
- Joint-metallism, an essay on a new monetary system. 1903.
- Summary report on the teaching of mathematics in Japan. 1912.
- Recent aims and political development of Japan. 1923.
- Industrial insurance in Japan. 1927.
- Sōsenkyo tokuhon. Iwanami Shoten, Publishers. 1928. (general election reader, or reading guide) This publication deals with issues related to the elections for the Japanese House of Representatives in the late 1920s.
- Calculation on soroban : reprinted from a chapter in Dr. Fujisawa's "Summary report on the teaching of mathematics in Japan" published by The Department of Education in 1912. 1930.
- Fujisawa Hakushi ibun shū. 1935. (Dr. Fujisawa memorial collection)
