= Upper Rhine Conference =

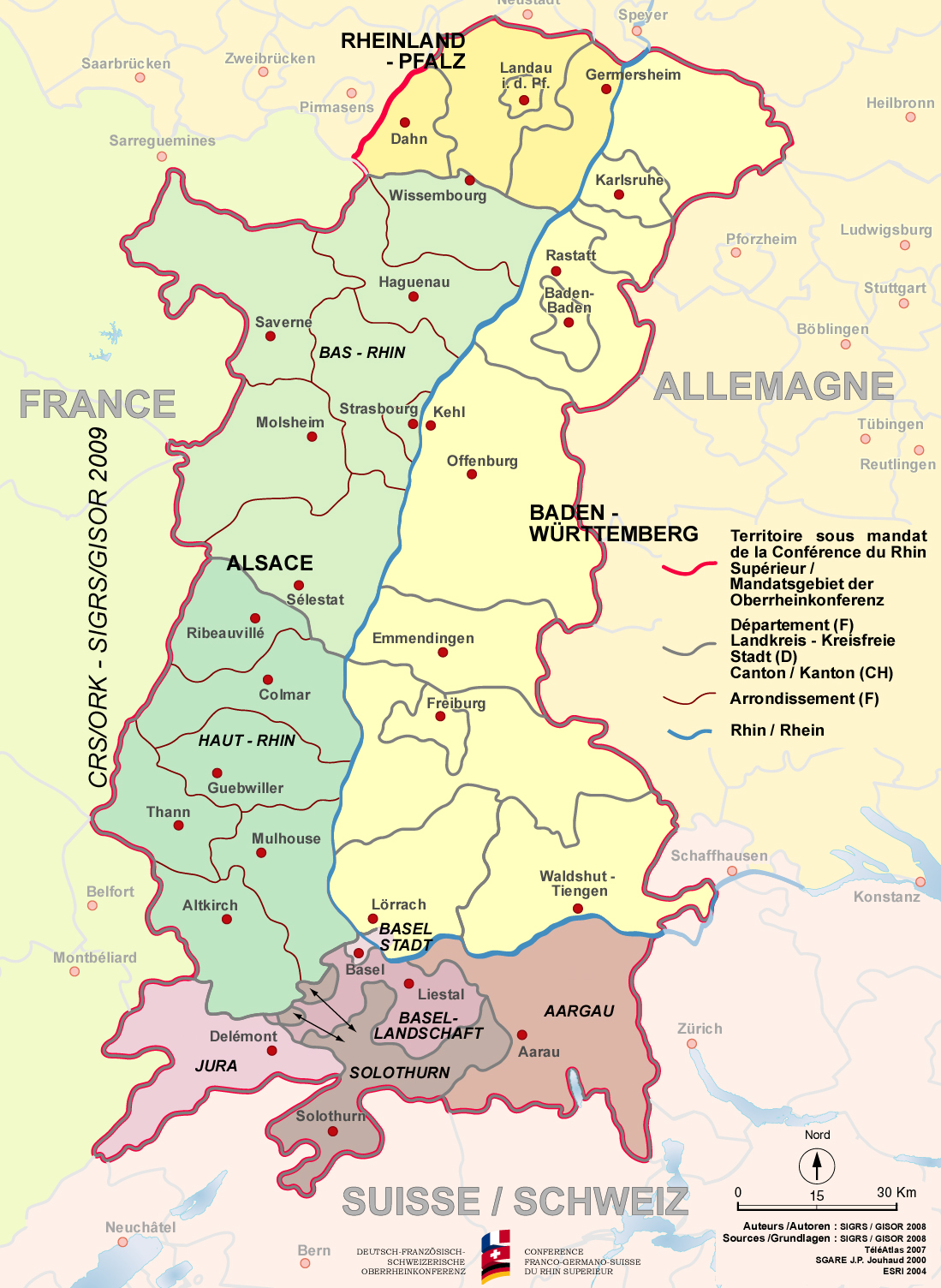
Participating areas in the Upper Rhine Conference

The Upper Rhine Conference (officially known as the Franco-German-Swiss Conference of the Upper Rhine) provides the institutional framework for cross-border cooperation in the Upper Rhine region. It is the successor organization to the two regional commissions (bipartite regional commission for the northern and tripartite regional commission for the southern Upper Rhine region) which derived from the 1975 Upper Rhine agreement between Germany, France and Switzerland, which were established to work under the auspices of the Franco-German-Swiss Intergovernmental Commission.

== Organization and structure ==
The committees of the Upper Rhine Conference are:

- Steering Committee: the coordinating and decision-making body of the Upper Rhine Conference, consisting of a delegation from each of the three countries; the heads of the delegations take it in turns to assume the presidency of the Upper Rhine Conference for one calendar year at a time. The heads of the delegations are, respectively
  - for France, the prefect of the region of Alsace
  - for Germany, (usually) the district president of Freiburg im Breisgau or Karlsruhe or the competent representative of Rhineland-Palatinate
  - for Switzerland, a Member of the Executive Council of one of the cantons of Basel-Stadt or Basel-Landschaft.
- Plenary Assembly: the discussion forum of the Upper Rhine Conference, consisting of one German, one French and one Swiss delegation with a maximum of 25 members each appointed by the heads of the respective delegations (see Steering Committee).
- Joint Secretariat: the management body of the Upper Rhine Conference, consisting of one permanent representative (Delegation Secretary) from each of the German, French and Swiss delegations plus one administrative assistant; based in Kehl (Germany) since 1996.
- Working groups: Twelve working groups have been established to deal with the cross-border issues that fall within the remit of the Upper Rhine Conference. These consist of experts from the French, German and Swiss partner institutions. Specifically, there are working groups for the following areas:
  - Education and vocational training
  - Public health
  - Youth programs
  - Disaster relief
  - Culture
  - Regional planning
  - Environment
  - Regional transport policy
  - Economic policy
  - Agriculture
  - Sport
  - Climate and Energy

The working groups assign work on specific issues or the implementation of specific projects to expert commissions. There are approx. 35 such expert commissions.

== Tripartite Congress ==
Ever since 1988 a Tripartite Congress has been held approximately every three years in order to present the results of the cross-border cooperation to a wider public and also to act as an impetus for further work by means of the political decisions (final declarations) taken there. The congresses are organized by each of the three participating countries in rotation.

The 13th Tripartite Congress was organised on June 27, 2012 in Landau under the heading "Rendez-vous régional - Zivilgesellschaft im Dialog mit...". The 12th Tripartite Congress took place in 2010 in Basel under the heading "Education, Research and innovation". It was organized by the REGIO BASILIENSIS on behalf of the five north-western cantons of Switzerland. The 11th Tripartite Congress took place on January 11, 2008 in Strasbourg (France) under the heading "The Upper Rhine: A model for development and cooperation". The main focus was on measures designed to promote the creation of a tripartite European metropolitan region of the Upper Rhine.

To date, the following Tripartite Congresses have taken place (with key topics, venue and year):

- Transport and communication, Kehl 1988
- Culture and development, Strasbourg 1989
- The environment, Basel 1991
- The economy, Karlsruhe 1992
- Youth, training and employment, Strasbourg 1995
- Trades and crafts, Basel 1997
- Regional development, Neustadt an der Weinstrasse 1999
- Living together within the Upper Rhine area, Strasbourg 2002
- Media and communication in the Upper Rhine area, Basel 2004
- The future of the Upper Rhine area in an enlarged Europe, Freiburg 2006
- The Upper Rhine: a model for development and cooperation, Strasbourg 2008
- Education, Research and innovation, Basel 2010
- Civil Society, Landau 2012

== See also ==
Upper Rhine
