= Upper Rhine =

Section of the Rhine in Germany and Switzerland

Upper Rhine (Oberrhein, Rhin Supérieur)
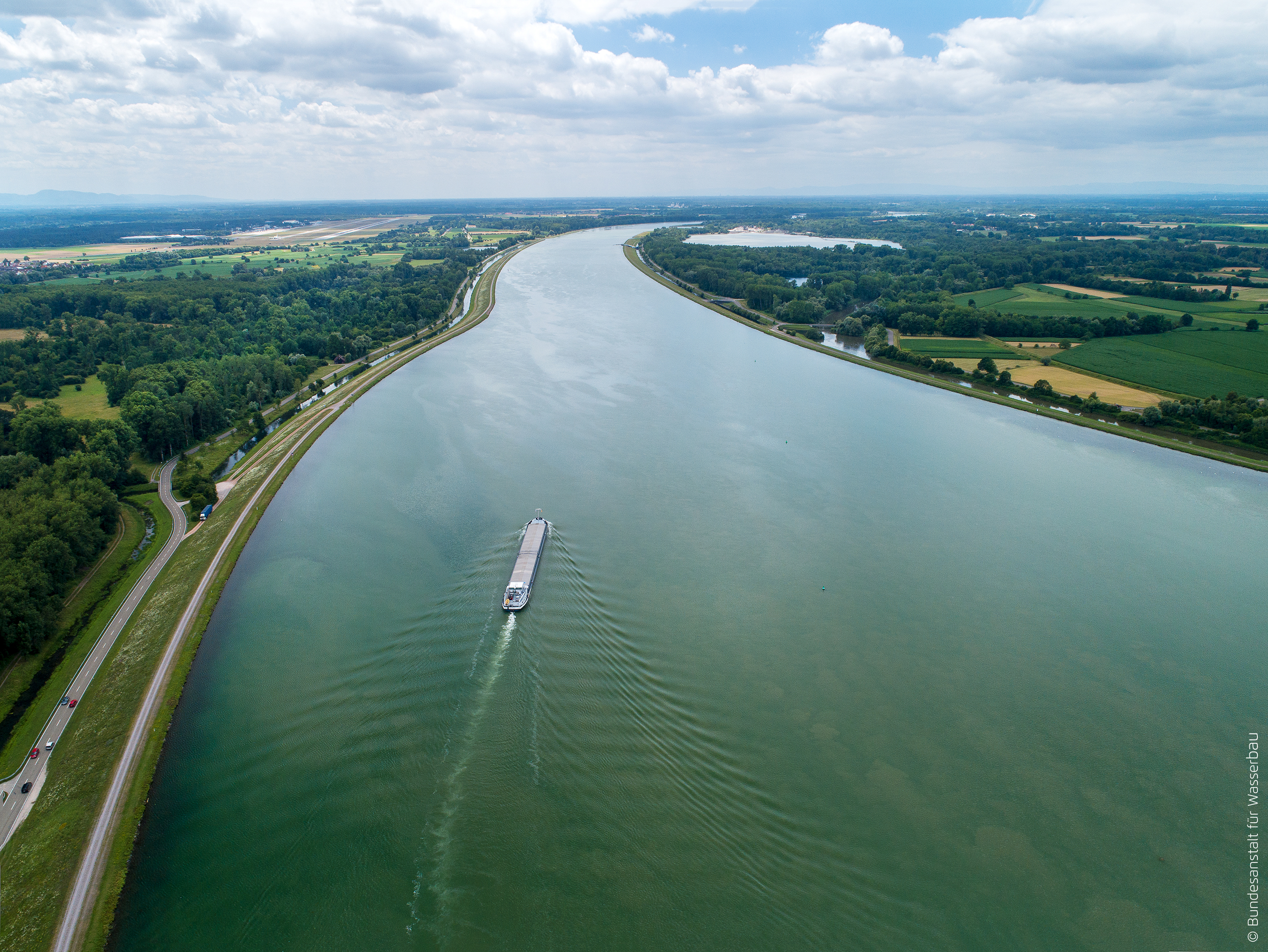
- Upper Rhine near Iffezheim

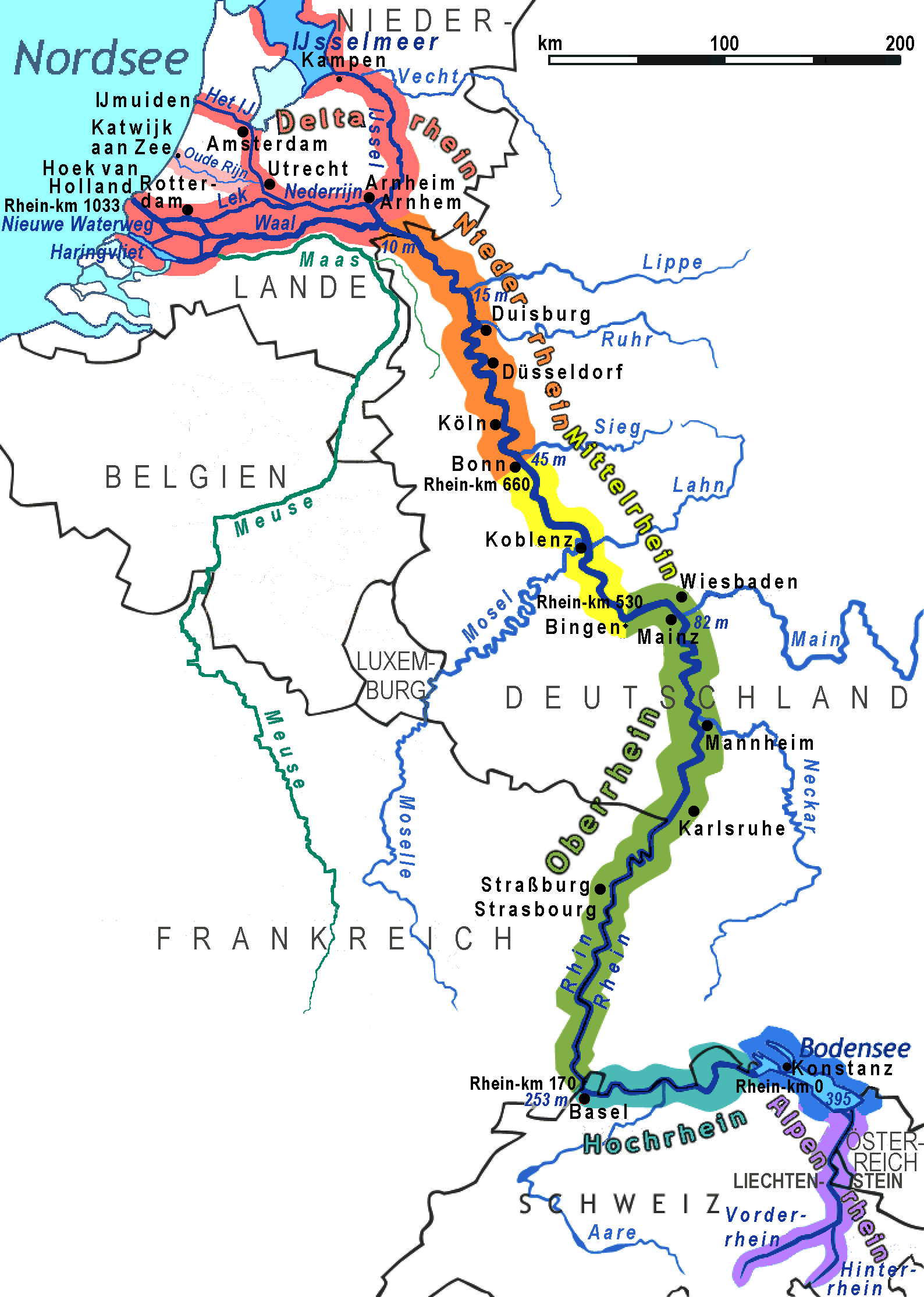
- Sections of the Rhine: Rhine–Meuse–Scheldt delta Lower Rhine Middle Rhine Upper Rhine High Rhine Lake Constance (Untersee, Seerhein, Obersee) Alpine Rhine, Vorderrhein, Hinterrhein Rhine sources

Location
- Country: Germany
- States: Baden-Württemberg, Hesse, Rhineland-Palatine
- Country: France
- Region Departments: Grand-Est; Bas-Rhin, Haut-Rhin
- Country Canton: Switzerland; Basel-Stadt

Physical characteristics
- Source
  - location: Rhine knee at Basel, Switzerland, continuation of the High Rhine
  - coordinates: 47.560148°N 7.589726°E
  - elevation: 252 m
- Mouth
  - location: Bingen am Rhein, confluence with the Nahe, continues as Middle Rhine
  - coordinates: 49°58′11″N 7°53′21″E
  - elevation: 89 m
- Length: 360 km (220 mi)
- Basin size: 185,000 km^{2}

Basin features
- Tributaries
  - left: Birsig, Ill, Lauter, Moder, Nahe
  - right: Acher, Alb, Elz, Kander, Kinzig, Main, Murg, Neckar, Pfinz, Queich, Rench, Sauer, Selz, Wiese

Upper Rhine (German: Oberrhein [ˈoːbɐˌʁaɪn]; French: Rhin Supérieur) is the section of the Rhine between the Middle Bridge in Basel, Switzerland, and the Rhine knee in Bingen, Germany. Representing kilometres 167 to 529 of the river (Note: The kilometrage of the Rhine begins at the Old Rhine Bridge in the city of Konstanz (Constance) and ends at the Hook of Holland at the North Sea.) it is surrounded by the Upper Rhine Plain (Oberrheinische Tiefebene). Most of its upper section marks the France–Germany border.

The Upper Rhine is one of four sections of the river between Lake Constance and the North Sea, and is succeeded downstream by the Middle Rhine and Lower Rhine; only the High Rhine and Alpine Rhine lie above it. The countries and states along the Upper Rhine are Switzerland, France (Alsace) and the German states of Baden-Württemberg, Rhineland-Palatinate and Hesse. The largest cities along the river are Basel, Mulhouse, Strasbourg, Karlsruhe, Mannheim, Ludwigshafen and Mainz.

The Upper Rhine was straightened between 1817 and 1876 by Johann Gottfried Tulla and made navigable between 1928 and 1977. The Treaty of Versailles allows France to use the Upper Rhine for hydroelectricity in the Grand Canal d'Alsace.

On the left bank are the French region of Alsace and the German state of Rhineland-Palatinate; on the right bank are the German states of Baden-Württemberg and Hesse. The first few kilometres are in the Swiss city of Basel.

== Geology ==
Around 35 million years ago, a rift valley of about 300 kilometres (190 mi) long and 50 kilometres (31 mi) wide came into being between the present cities of Basel and Frankfurt. This was due to tensile stresses in the Earth's crust and mantle, which resulted in lowering the earth's surface. The moat has been partially filled up again by sedimentation. On the edges we find mountain ridges, the so-called "rift flanks". On the eastern side, they are the Black Forest and Odenwald mountains, in the west the Vosges and Palatinate Forest. During the Tertiary, the High Rhine continued west from Basel and flowed via the Doubs and the Saône, into the Rhône. The rift diverted the Rhine into the newly formed Upper Rhine Valley.

The Rhine knee at Basel marks the transition from the High Rhine to the Upper Rhine with a change of direction from West to North and a change of landscape from the relatively small-chamber high-Rhine cuesta landscape to the wide rift zone of the Upper Rhine Rift Valley. The two largest tributaries come from the right: the Neckar in Mannheim, the Main across from Mainz. In the northwest corner of the Upper Rhine Valley, at Rhine-kilometre 529.1, near Bingen, where the Nahe flows into the Rhine, the Rhine flows into a gorge in the Rhenish Massif and thereby changes into the Middle Rhine.

== Geography ==
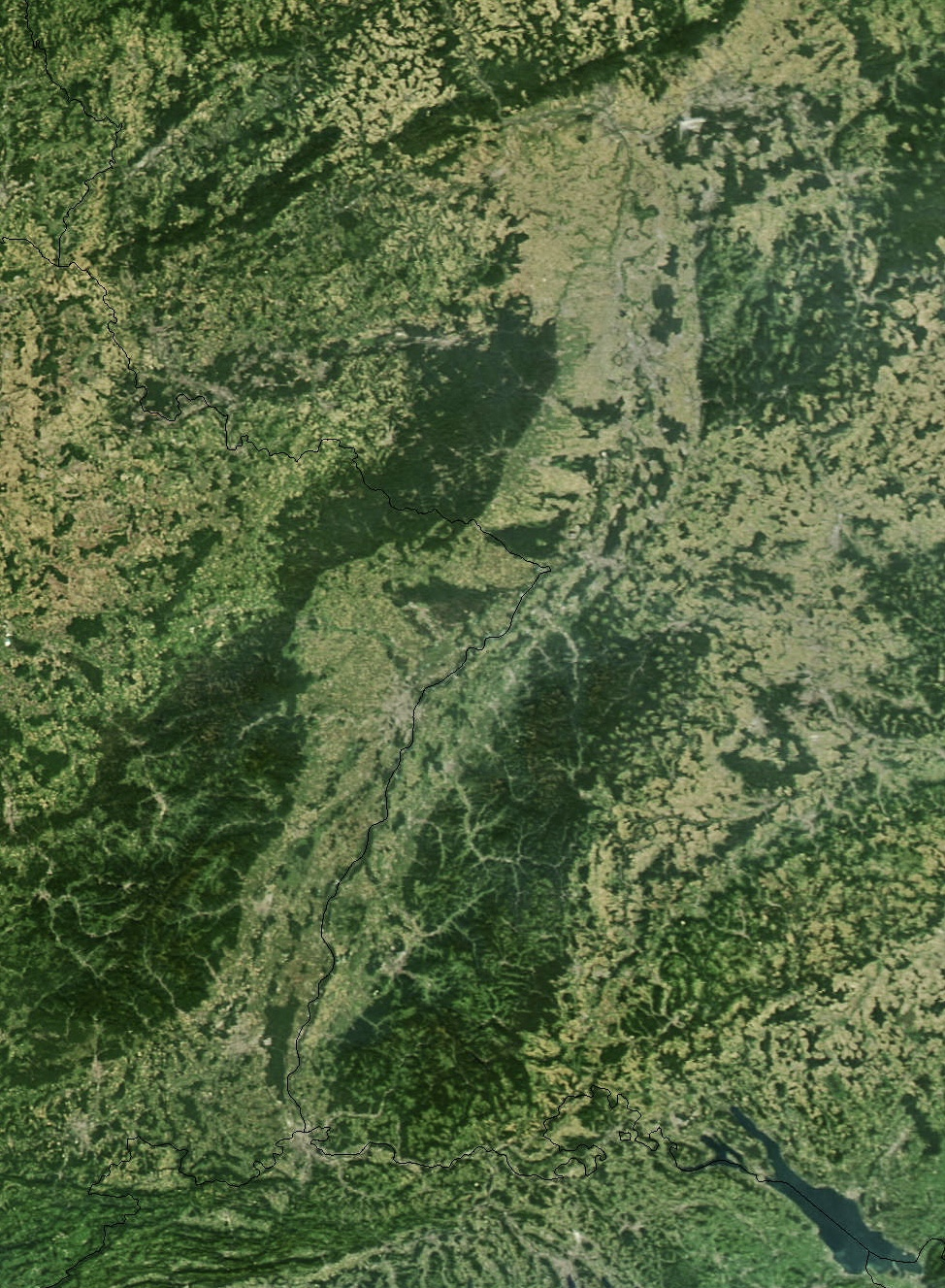
Satellite View of the Upper Rhine Valley and the upper Rhine; on the top left are the Rhenish Slate Mountains; on the bottom right Lake Constance

=== Tributaries ===
Tributaries are listed in direction of flow (bottom to top), with the nearest settlement to their confluence given in brackets.

Left tributaties:

- Nahe (near Bingen am Rhein, Germany)
- Lauter (near Neuburg am Rhein)
- Moder (near Neuhäusel)
- Sauer (near Seltz)
- Ill (near Offendorf, France)
- Birsig (in Basel, Switzerland)

Right tributaries:

- Selz (in Ingelheim, Germany)
- Main (in Mainz)
- Neckar (in Mannheim)
- Queich (near Germersheim)
- Pfinz (near Germersheim)
- Murg (near Rastatt)
- Sauer (in Seltz, France)
- Acher (near Lichtenau)
- Rench (near Lichtenau)
- Kinzig (near Kehl)
- Elz (near Lahr)
- Kander (near Weil am Rhein)
- Wiese (near Basel, Switzerland)

=== Bordering regions ===
- Germany
  - Baden-Württemberg
    - Breisgau-Hochschwarzwald, Emmendingen, Karlsruhe, Karlsruhe (district), Lörrach, Mannheim, Ortenau, Rastatt, Rhein-Neckar
  - Hesse
    - Bergstraße, Groß-Gerau, Rheingau-Taunus, Wiesbaden
  - Rhineland-Palatine
    - Alzey-Worms, Frankenthal, Germersheim, Ludwigshafen, Mainz, Mainz-Bingen, Rhein-Pfalz, Speyer, Worms
- France
  - Grand-Est
    - Bas-Rhin, Haut-Rhin
- Switzerland
  - Basel-Stadt

=== Tri-national metropolitan region ===
The Upper Rhine tri-national region (French: Région Métropolitaine Trinationale du Rhin Supérieur, German: Trinationale Metropolregion Oberrhein) is a Euroregion that covers the border areas of the Upper Rhine (the northern part of the Upper Rhine valley and the Palatinate are not included as they are not border areas) and parts of the High Rhine. As the name suggests, it is a tri-national region comprising parts of France, Germany and Switzerland. The regional Upper Rhine Conference is a framework for future political and administrative cooperation in the area.

The tripoint between France, Germany and Switzerland, called Dreiländereck, lies within the uppermost portion of the Upper Rhine. A monument in Basel, known as the Pylon, is located 160 m (520 ft) southeast of the actual tripoint.

== Interventions ==
=== Straightening ===
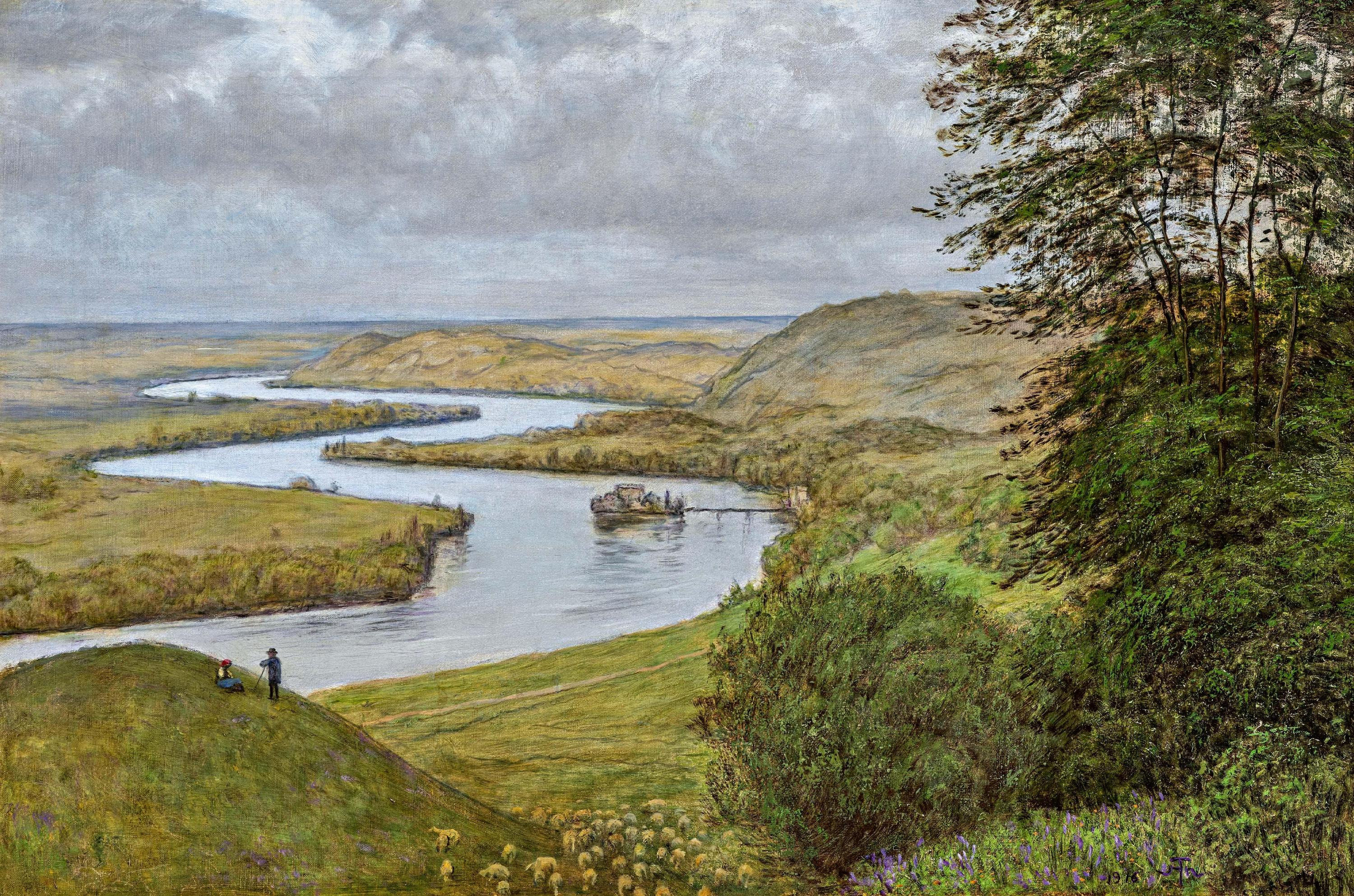
Landschaft am Oberrhein, artwork by Hans Thoma, 1916

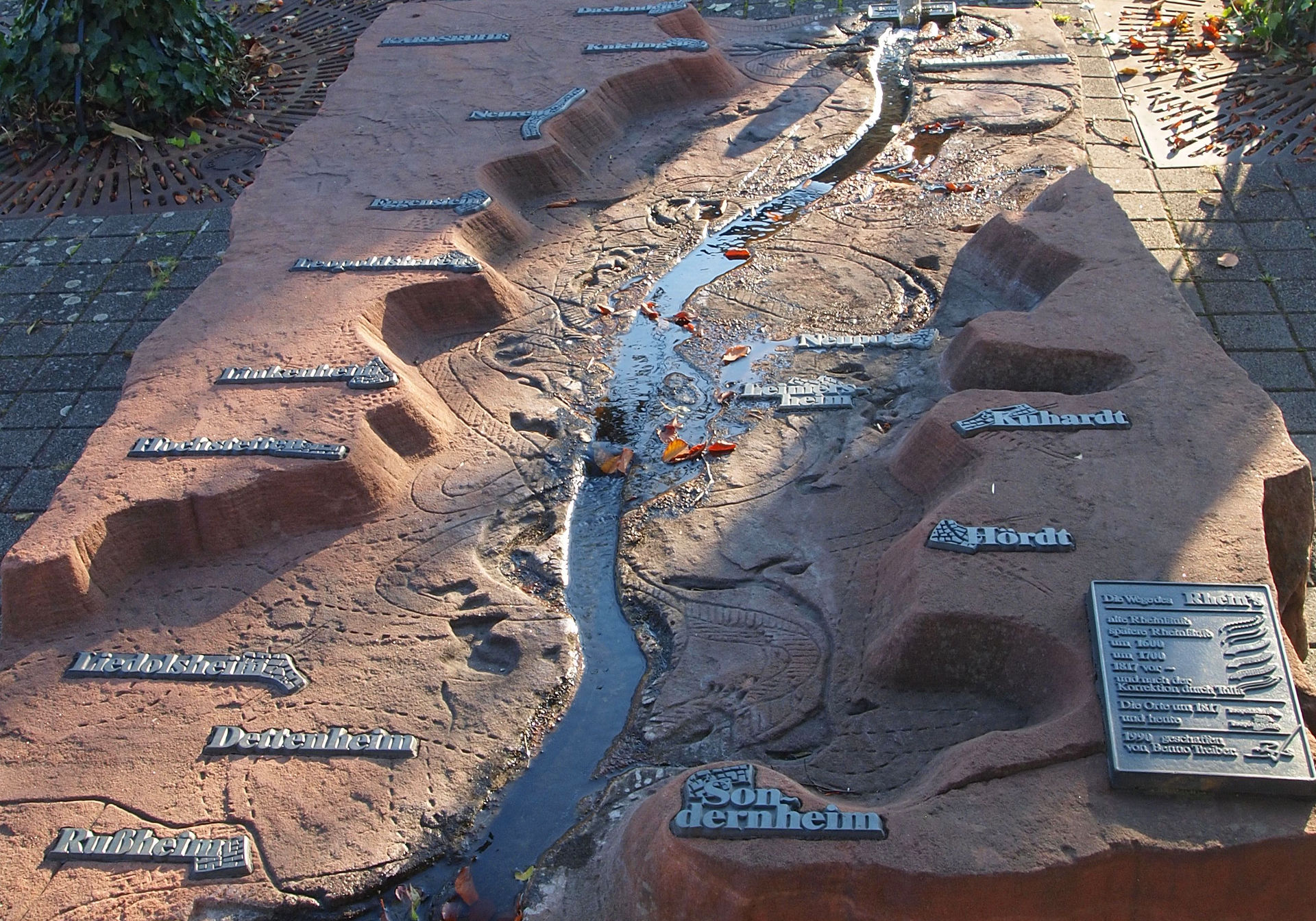
Straightening monument viewed from the north

In 1685, Louis XIV started a project to move the Upper Rhine, change its course and drain the floodplain, in order to gain land. By 1840, the river had been moved up to 1.5 kilometres (0.93 mi) to the east, taking territory away from Baden. Around 1790, large parts of the Rhine Valley were deforested, creating arable land, fields and pasture to feed the population. The Upper Rhine was straightened between 1817 and 1876 by Johann Gottfried Tulla and changed from a relatively sluggish meandering river with major and many smaller branches into a fast flowing stream flanked by embankments. The length of the Upper Rhine was reduced by 81 kilometres (50 mi). Some cut-off river arms and ox-bows remain; they are typically called the 'Old Rhine' (German: Altrhein) or Gießen (similar to the Old Rhine (Alter Rhein) in the Alpine Rhine Valley, where the Rhine was also straightened).

=== Canalising and dams ===
The Rhine between Basel and Iffezheim is almost entirely canalised. On a stretch of 180 kilometres (110 mi), there are 10 dams, provided with hydropower stations and locks. Between Basel and Breisach, the old river bed carries hardly any water; almost all water is diverted through the Grand Canal d'Alsace on the French side, to ensure safe shipping and hydropower generation around the clock. Only when there is a large supply of water, then the old river bed will receive more water than the canal. France gained the right to do this in the 1919 Treaty of Versailles; the right applies to the segment between Basel and Neuburgweier/Lauterbourg, where the Rhine forms the border between France and Germany.

The straightening (1817–76) and channeling (1928–77) reduced the water table by up to 16 metres (52 ft) and thus had a negative effect on flora and fauna. Gravel is also missing from the river, due to the dams. This has caused erosion below the dam at Iffezheim. To counter this, 173,000 cubic metres (6,100,000 ft^{3}) per year of a mixture of sand and gravel with an average grain diameter of 20 millimetres (0.79 in) (corresponding to the local sediment transport capacity) has been dumped into the river, since 1978, using two motorized barges.

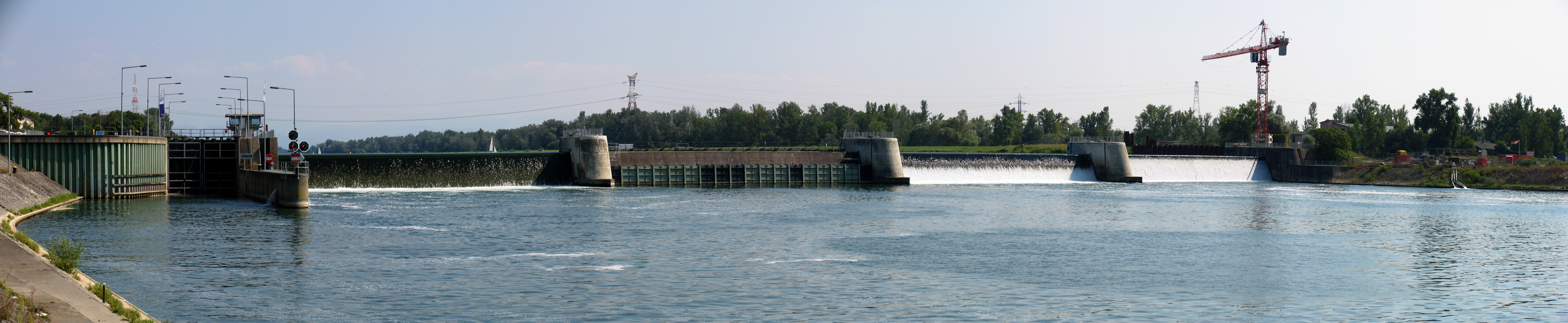
Weir at Breisach; to the left a lock; to the right a small power station under construction

=== Integrated Rhine Programme (IRP) ===
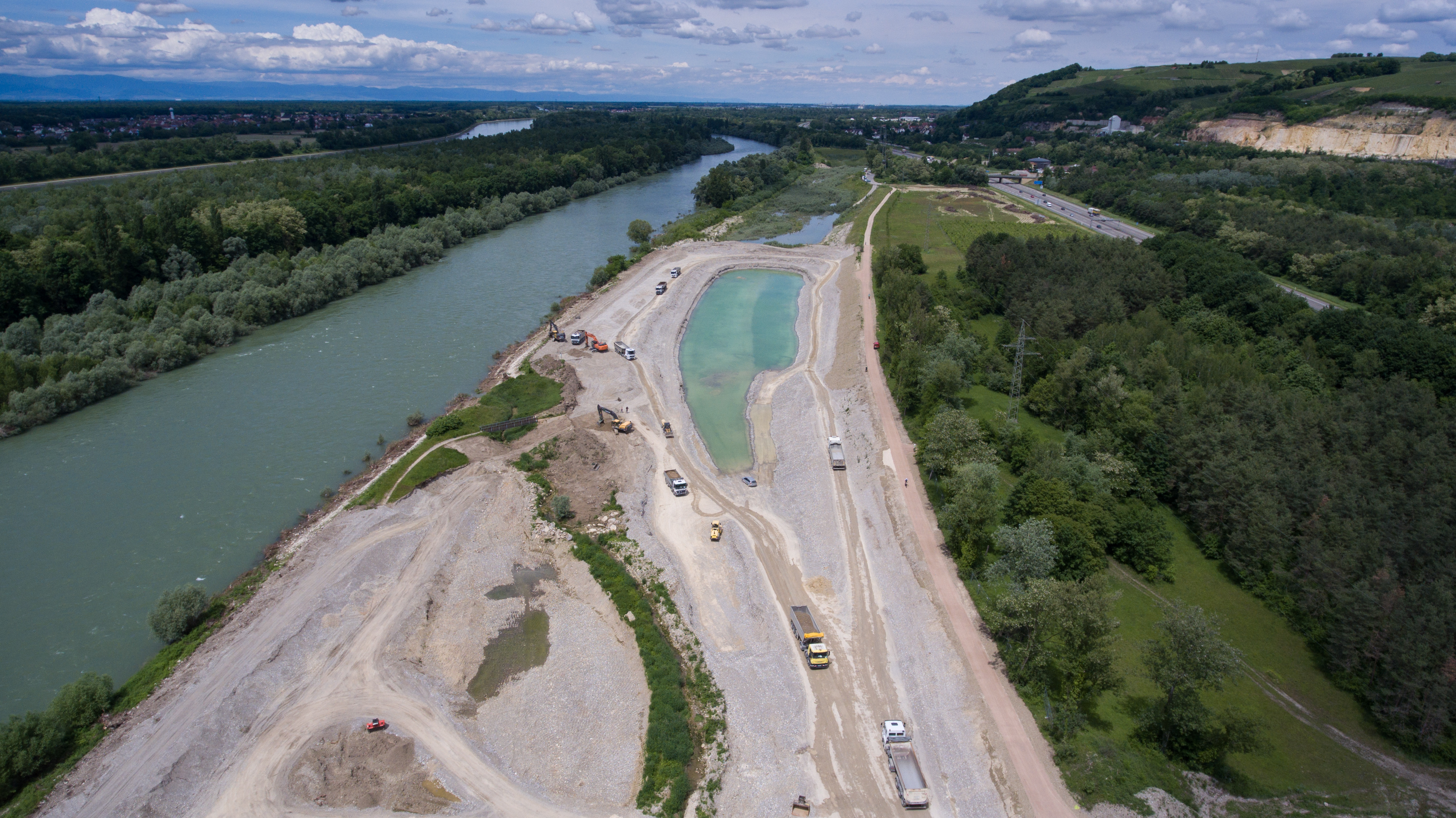
Integrated Rhine Programme (IRP) Polder under construction near Efringen-Kirchen

The Upper Rhine plays a key role in flood control on the Middle and Lower Rhine. As a result of the straightening of the Upper Rhine, floods from the Alps now reach the Middle Rhine much faster than in the past. Thus, the risk of such a peak coinciding with a flood peak of Neckar, Moselle or Main has increased. About 123 square kilometres (47 mi^{2}) of floodplain have been lost. Authorities in riparian states of France, Baden-Württemberg and Rhineland-Palatinate have launched the Integrated Rhine Programme, a framework for designating water retention areas. to combat downstream flooding. A French-German treaty was concluded in 1982, in which the parties agreed to restore the retention capacity on the stretch below Iffezheim to the level it had before the area was developed.

This means: For the stretch between Iffezheim and the mouth of the Neckar, attenuation of the apex of a 200-year flood (i.e. a flood that statistically occurs once in 200 years) of the Rhine to a discharge of 5,000 cubic metres per second (180,000 cu ft/s) at the Maxau gauge station, that is, a reduction from 5,700 cubic metres per second (200,000 cu ft/s) to 5,000 cubic metres per second (180,000 cu ft/s).

- for the stretch below the mouth of the Neckar, attenuation of the apex of a 220-year flood to a discharge of 6,000 cubic metres per second (210,000 cu ft/s) at the Worms gauge station, that is, a reduction from 6,800 cubic metres per second (240,000 cu ft/s) to 6,000 cubic metres per second (210,000 cu ft/s).

For this purpose the following measures are planned and partially implemented:

- By France: Special operations power stations on the Rhine and construction of two polders Erstein and Moder
- By Baden-Württemberg: construction of about 13 polders
- By Rhineland-Palatinate: construction of polders and relocating levees

The effectiveness of the flood protection measures was verified using a computer model. The State Institute for the Environment, Nature Protection and Measurements in Baden-Württemberg carried out forecast calculations with the help of a mathematical "synoptic flood progression model". The analysis of the calculations and the evaluation of the results were made on the basis of the requirements and methods set by the international Flood Study Commission for the Rhine. The implementation of the proposed flood control measures on the Upper Rhine can prevent the occurrence of a 200-year-flood between Iffezheim and Bingen, with an overall economic loss estimated at 6.2 billion euros.

== Conservation ==
Designations

Ramsar Wetland
- Official name: Oberrhein
- Designated: 28 August 2008
- Reference no.: 1809

Ramsar Wetland
- Official name: Rhin Supérieur
- Designated: 5 September 2008
- Reference no.: 1810

The floodplains between Mainz and Bingen are important for nature conservation. In this section, the so-called Island Rhine, there are many nature reserves and bird sanctuaries.

== Gallery ==
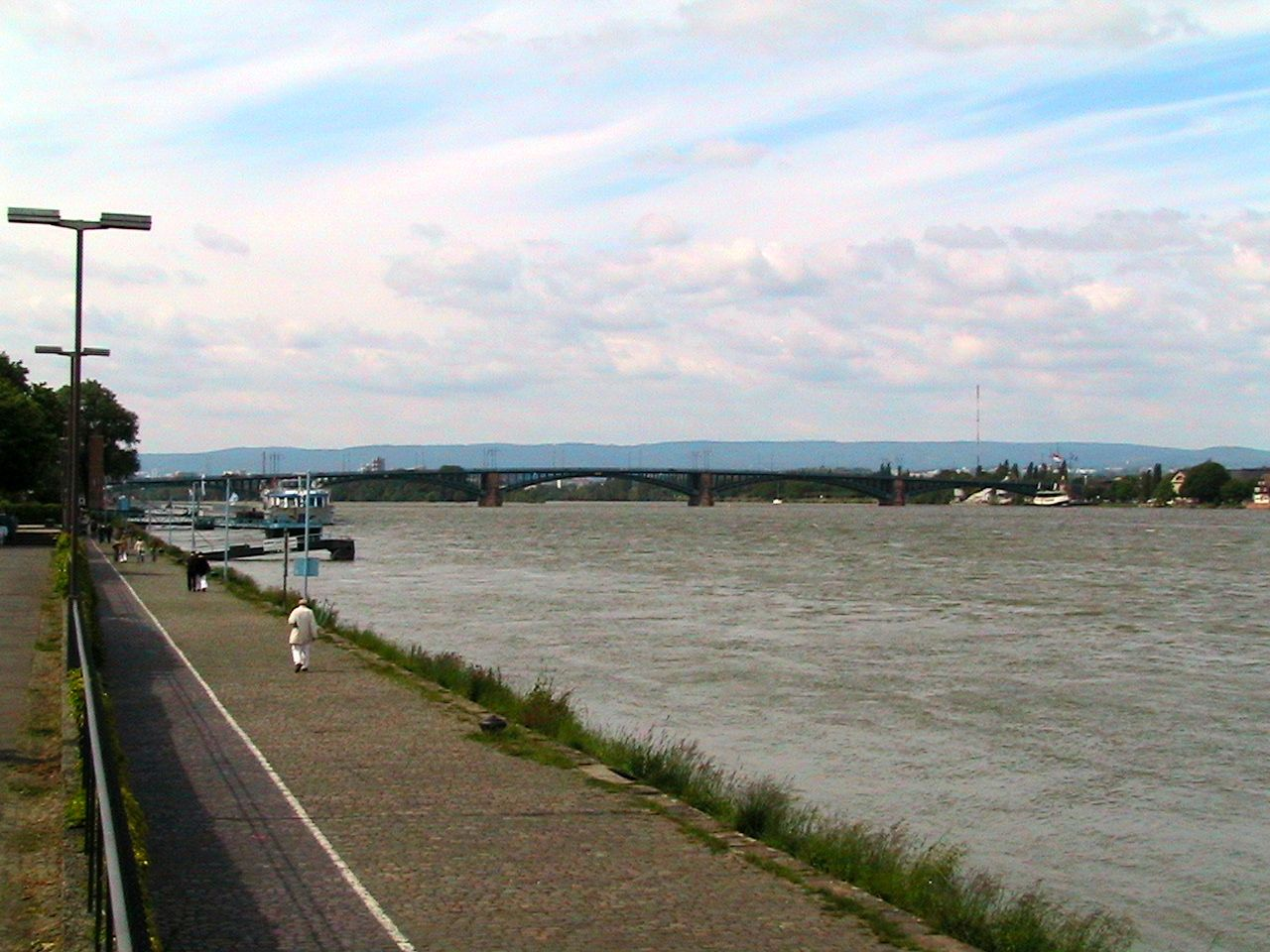
The Rhine at Mainz Theodor Heuss Bridge in Mainz

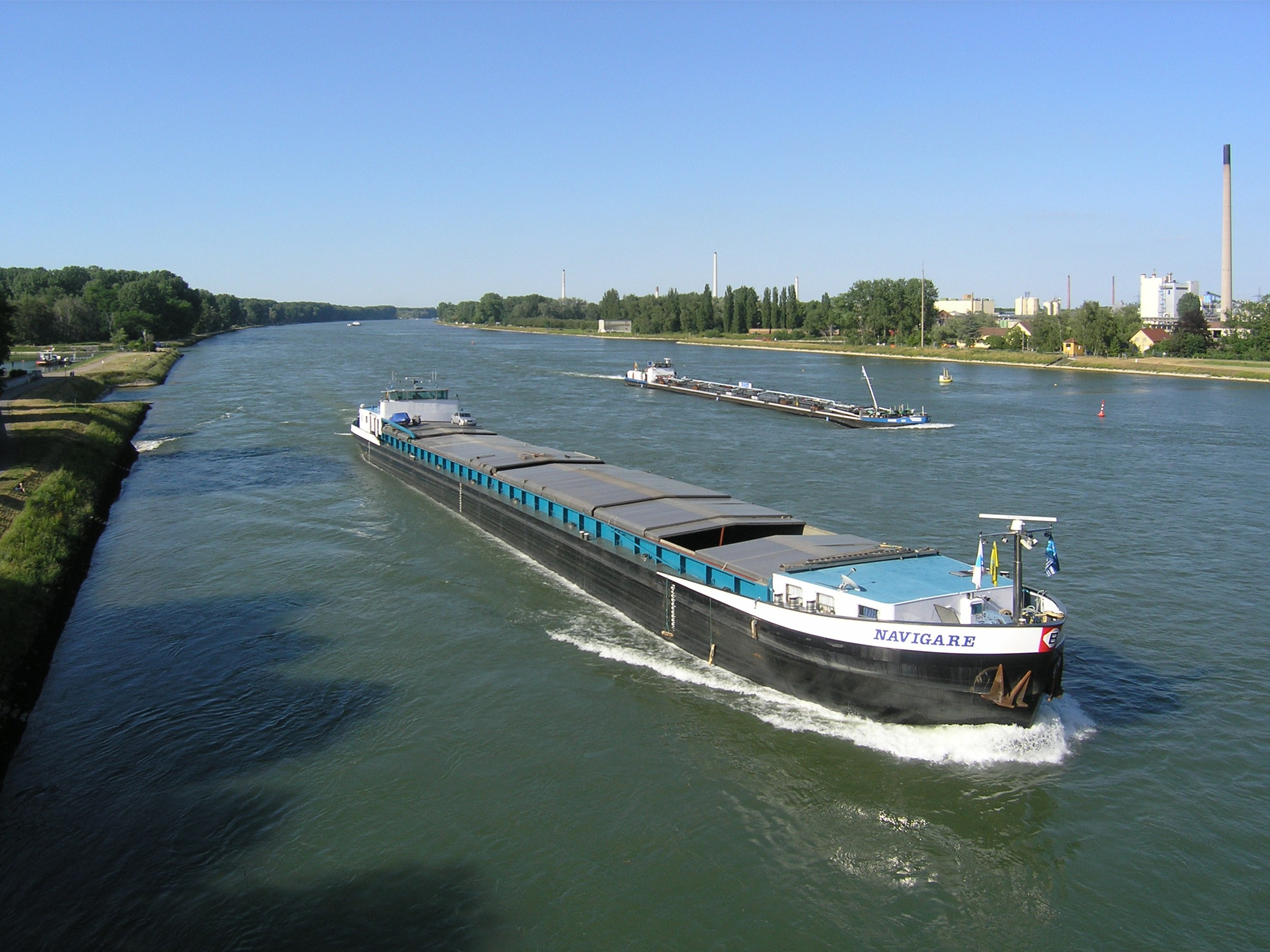
Cargo ships on the straightened Upper Rhine near Karlsruhe

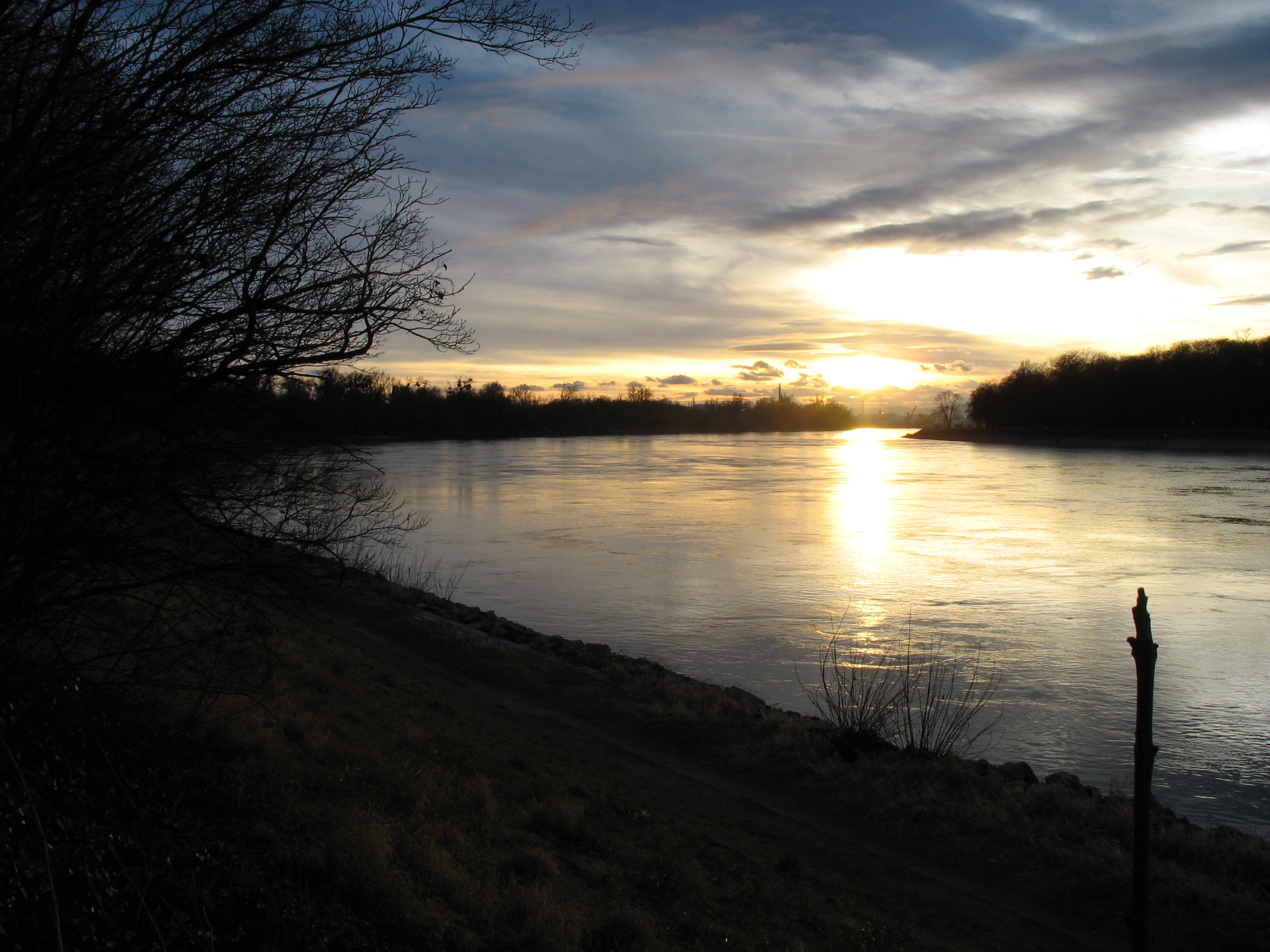
Sunset on the Rhine at Mannheim

Fortifications on the Upper Rhine 1720

== See also ==
- Upper Rhine aquifer
- Upper Alsace
- List of rivers of France
- List of rivers of Germany

== Bibliography ==
- Dieter Balle: Kultur- und Naturführer Oberrhein. Zwischen Mannheim und Basel, Verlag Regionalkultur, Ubstadt-Weiher 2007. ISBN 978-3-89735-496-8
- Manfred Bosch: Oberrheingeschichten, Verlag Klöpfer und Meyer, 2010, 384 pages, ISBN 3-940086-47-9 (an anthology)
- Upper Rhine Agency: Rahmenkonzept des Landes Baden-Württemberg zur Umsetzung des Integrierten Rheinprogramms. Part I Wiederherstellung des Hochwasserschutzes, Part II Erhaltung und Renaturierung der Auelandschaft am Oberrhein. Materialien zum integrierten Rheinprogramm. Lahr, September, 1996
- Ministry of Environment Baden-Württemberg: Das Integrierte Rheinprogramm: Hochwasserschutz und Auenrenaturierung am Oberrhein, Stuttgart, May, 2007
- Water and Shipping Directorate South West: Kompendium der Wasser- und Schifffahrtsdirektion Südwest. Organizational and technical data, inland navigation, duties, waterways. Self-published, June 2007
