= Rathenauplatz station =

Metro station in Nuremberg, Germany

Rathenauplatz
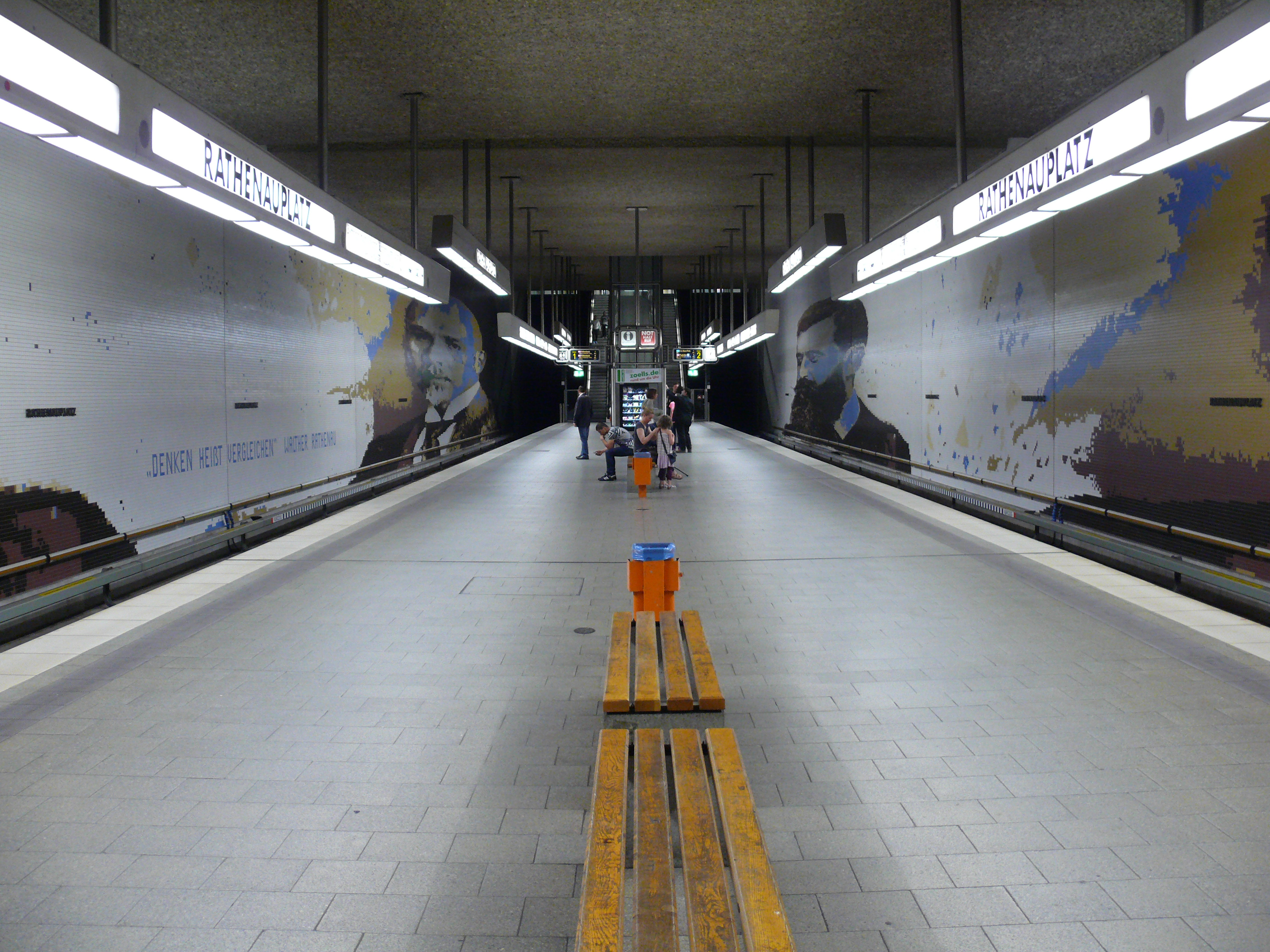

General information
- Location: Rathenaupl. 90489 Nürnberg, Germany
- Coordinates: 49.4568178°N 11.0893937°E
- System: Nuremberg U-Bahn station
- Operator: Verkehrs-Aktiengesellschaft Nürnberg
- Connections: Tram: (Bayernstraße) – Tristanstraße – Erlenstegen; Bus: 36 Plärrer - Doku-Zentrum; 94 Sportanlage FCN - Hl.-Geist-Spital; 340 Nürnberg - Ittling

Construction
- Structure type: Underground

Other information
- Fare zone: VGN: 100

History
- Opened: 29 September 1990

Services
Preceding station	Nuremberg U-Bahn	Following station
Wöhrder Wiese towards Röthenbach	U2	Rennweg towards Flughafen
Wöhrder Wiese towards Großreuth bei Schweinau	U3	Maxfeld towards Nordwestring
Location

Rathenauplatz station is a Nuremberg U-Bahn station, located on the U2 and U3. The station is named for the nearby square which was in turn named for the assassinated industrial leader and foreign minister of Germany Walther Rathenau. A portrait of Rathenau adorns the walls of the station and there is also a portrait of the father of Zionism, Theodor Herzl. When traveling in a northerly direction, Rathenauplatz is the last station served by both U2 and U3 and it is therefore a busy interchange station. Late night U3 trips short turn here from Großreuth bei Schweinau station.
