= Technische Hochschule Nürnberg =

Hochschule in Nuremberg, Germany

Coordinates: 49.4531°N 11.0924°E

Technische Hochschule Nürnberg Georg Simon Ohm
- Type: Public
- Established: 1971
- President: Niels Oberbeck
- Academic staff: 1,855
- Students: 12,234
- Location: Nuremberg, Bavaria, Germany
- Website: www.th-nuernberg.de

The Technische Hochschule Nürnberg Georg Simon Ohm (shortened TH Nürnberg; English name Nuremberg Institute of Technology Georg Simon Ohm) is a public Technische Hochschule in Nuremberg, Bavaria. With its 12,200 students and 1,800 faculty members, it is the second biggest Technische Hochschule in Bavaria. President is Niels Oberbeck.

The university got its name in honor of Georg Simon Ohm who was a professor and headmaster of the predecessor of the Hochschule, the Polytechnische Schule, between 1839 and 1849.

The logo of the Technische Hochschule is the Ω as a reference to Ohm the SI derived unit for electric resistance named after Georg Simon Ohm.

The main campus is located around the Wöhrder Wiese city park close to Nuremberg's downtown area. There are more facilities distributed around the city. They also contain a cafeteria and a university owned kindergarten called Milliohm.

== Faculties ==
- Applied Chemistry
- Applied Mathematics, Physics and General Science
- Architecture
- Business administration
- Civil Engineering
- Computer Science
- Design
- Electrical Engineering, Precision Engineering, Information Technology
- Materials Science
- Mechanical Engineering and Building Services Engineering
- Social Science
- Process Engineering
