= Prym differential =

In mathematics, a Prym differential of a Riemann surface is a differential form on the universal covering space that transforms according to some complex character of the fundamental group. Equivalently it is a section of a certain line bundle on the Riemann surface in the same component as the canonical bundle. Prym differentials were introduced by Friedrich Prym (1869).

The space of Prym differentials on a compact Riemann surface of genus g has dimension g – 1, unless the character of the fundamental group is trivial, in which case Prym differentials are the same as ordinary differentials and form a space of dimension g.
