= Georg Ohm =

German mathematician and physicist (1789–1854)

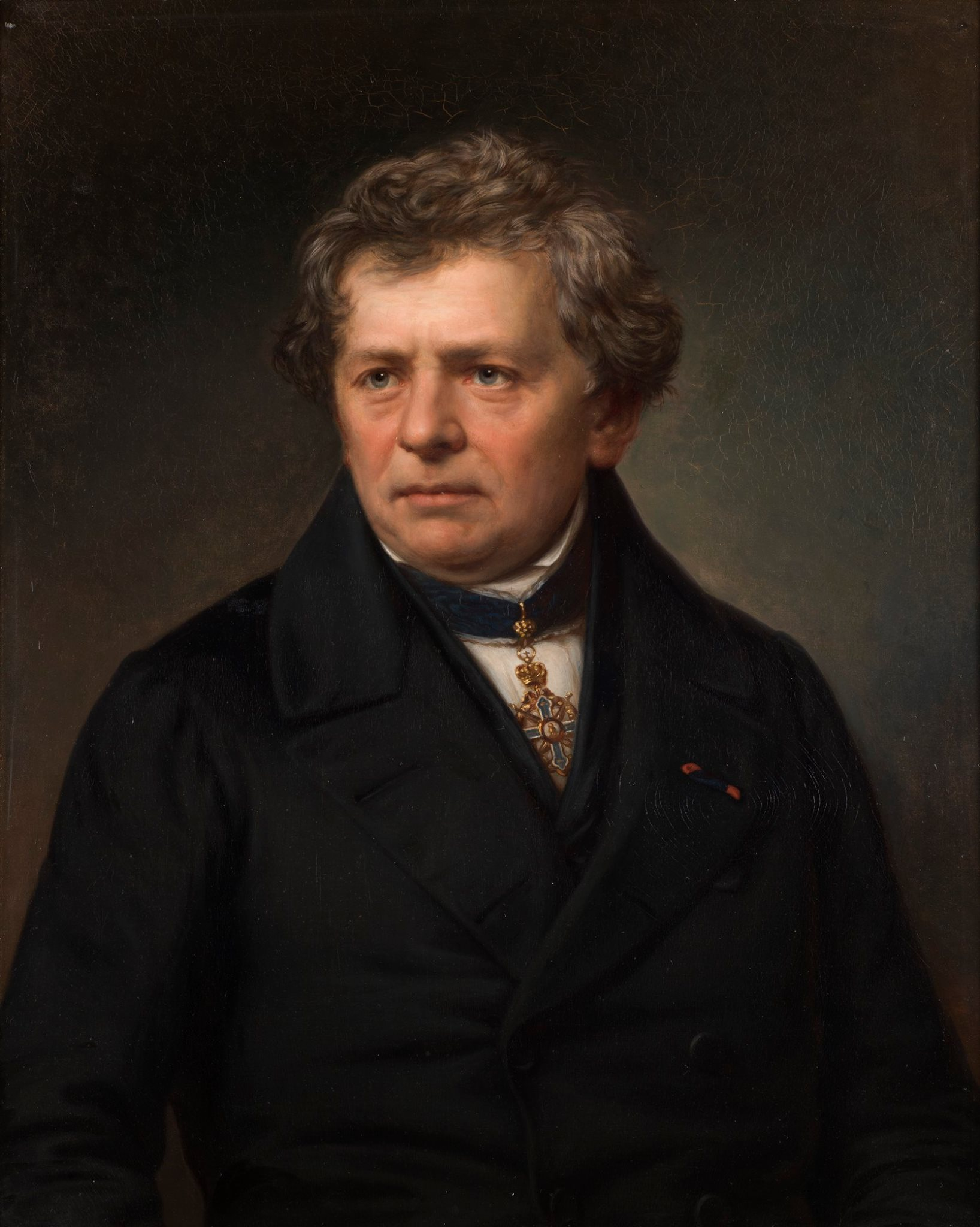
- Born: Georg Simon Ohm; 16 March 1789; Erlangen, Principality of Bayreuth, Holy Roman Empire
- Died: 6 July 1854 (aged 65); Munich, Kingdom of Bavaria, German Confederation
- Resting place: Alter Südfriedhof, Munich
- Education: University of Erlangen (PhD, 1811)
- Known for: Ohm's law (1827); Ohm's acoustic law (1843)
- Relatives: Martin Ohm (brother)
- Awards: Copley Medal (1841)
- Scientific career
- Fields: Acoustics; electromagnetism
- Workplaces: Dreikönigsgymnasium (from 1817); Polytechnic School of Nuremberg (1833–1852); Ludwig-Maximilians-Universität München (1852–1854)
- Doctoral advisor: Karl Christian von Langsdorf

Georg Simon Ohm (/oʊm/; German: [oːm]; 16 March 1789 – 6 July 1854) was a German mathematician and physicist. As a school teacher, Ohm began his research with the new electrochemical cell, invented by Italian scientist Alessandro Volta. Using equipment of his own creation, Ohm found that there is a direct proportionality between the potential difference (voltage) applied across a conductor and the resultant electric current; this relation is known as Ohm's law.

== Biography ==
=== Early life ===
Georg Simon Ohm was born into a Protestant family in Erlangen, Brandenburg-Bayreuth (then part of the Holy Roman Empire), son to locksmith Johann Wolfgang Ohm, and Maria Elizabeth Beck, daughter of a tailor in Erlangen. Although his parents had not been formally educated, Ohm's father was a respected man who had educated himself to a high level and was able to give his sons an excellent education through his own teachings. Of the seven children of the family only three survived to adulthood: Georg Simon, his younger brother Martin, who later became a well-known mathematician, and his sister Elizabeth Barbara. His mother died when he was ten.

From early childhood, Georg and Martin were taught by their father who brought them to a high standard in mathematics, physics, chemistry and philosophy. Georg Simon attended Erlangen Gymnasium from age eleven to fifteen where he received little in the area of scientific training, which sharply contrasted with the inspired instruction that both Georg and Martin received from their father. This characteristic made the Ohms bear a resemblance to the Bernoulli family, as noted by Karl Christian von Langsdorf, a professor at the University of Erlangen.

=== Life at university ===
Georg Ohm's father, concerned that his son was wasting his educational opportunity, sent Ohm to Switzerland. There, in September 1806, Ohm accepted a position as a mathematics teacher in a school in Gottstadt bei Nidau.

Karl Christian von Langsdorf left the University of Erlangen in early 1809 to take up a post at Heidelberg University. Ohm wanted to restart his mathematical studies with Langsdorf at Heidelberg University. Langsdorf, however, advised Ohm to pursue mathematical studies on his own, and suggested that Ohm read works of Euler, Laplace and Lacroix. Rather reluctantly Ohm took his advice, but he left his teaching post in Gottstatt Monastery in March 1809 to become a private tutor in Neuchâtel. For two years, he carried out his duties as a tutor while he followed Langsdorf's advice and continued his private study of mathematics. Then in April 1811, he returned to the University of Erlangen.

=== Teaching career ===
Ohm's own studies prepared him for his doctorate which he received from the University of Erlangen on October 25, 1811. He immediately joined the faculty there as a lecturer in mathematics but left after three semesters because of unpromising prospects. He could not survive on his salary as a lecturer. The Bavarian government offered him a post as a teacher of mathematics and physics at a poor quality school in Bamberg which Ohm accepted in January 1813. Unhappy with his job, Georg began writing an elementary textbook on geometry as a way to prove his abilities. That school was closed in February 1816. The Bavarian government then sent Ohm to an overcrowded school in Bamberg to help out with the teaching of mathematics.

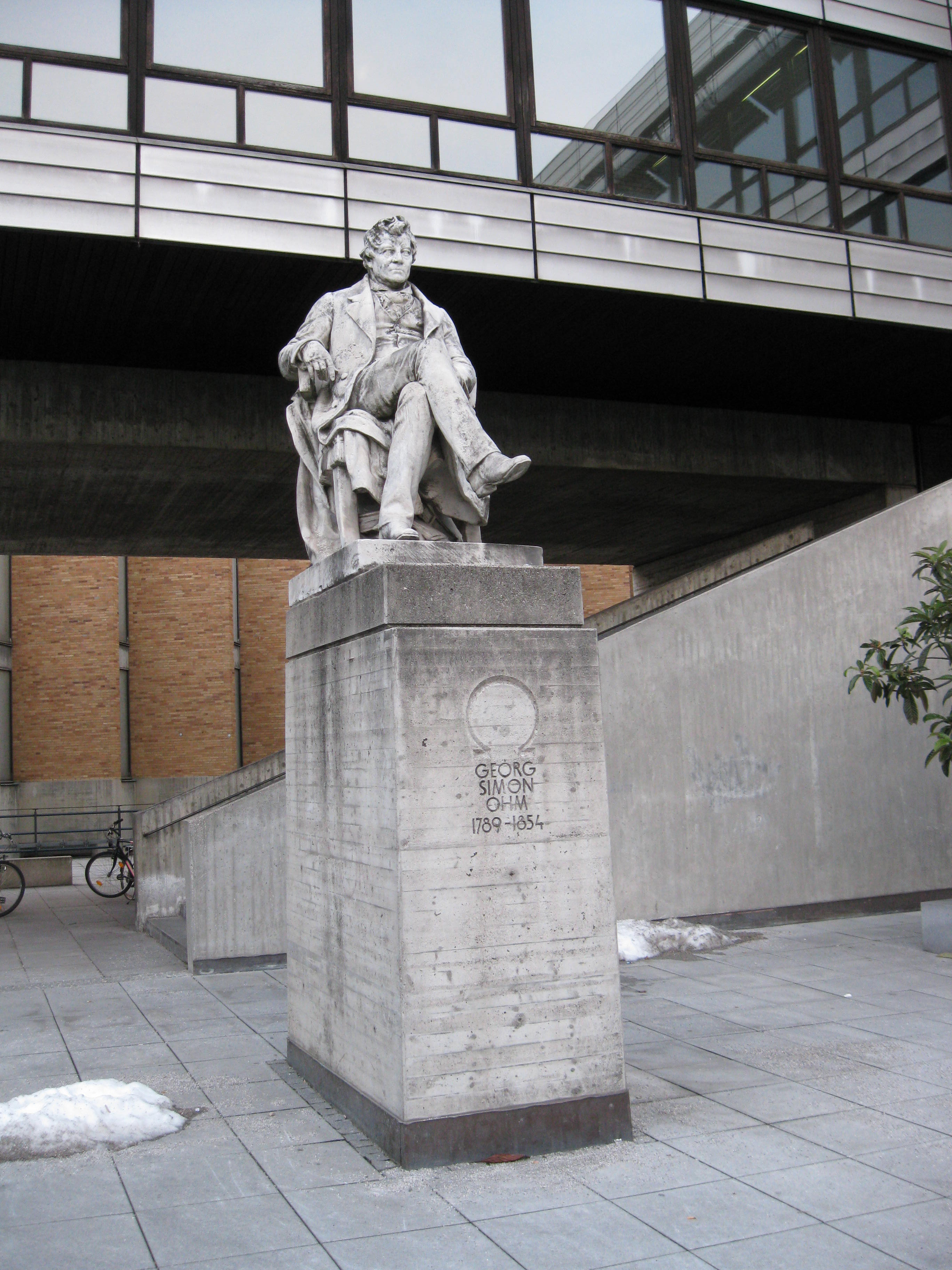
Memorial for Ohm (by Wilhelm von Rümann) at the Technical University of Munich, Campus Theresienstrasse

After his assignment in Bamberg, Ohm sent his completed manuscript to King Wilhelm III of Prussia. The King was satisfied with Ohm's book, and offered Ohm a position at the Jesuit Gymnasium of Cologne on 11 September 1817. This school had a reputation for good science education and Ohm was required to teach physics in addition to mathematics. The physics laboratory was well-equipped, allowing Ohm to begin experiments in physics. As the son of a locksmith, Ohm had some practical experience with mechanical devices.

Ohm published Die galvanische Kette, mathematisch bearbeitet (The Galvanic Circuit Investigated Mathematically) in 1827. Ohm's college did not appreciate his work and Ohm resigned from his position. He then made an application to, and was employed by the Polytechnic School of Nuremberg. Ohm arrived at the Polytechnic School of Nuremberg in 1833, and in 1852, he became a professor of experimental physics at the Ludwig-Maximilians-Universität München.

In 1849, Ohm published Beiträge zur Molecular-Physik (Molecular Physics). In the preface of this work he stated he hoped to write a second and third volume "and if God gives me length of days for it, a fourth". However, on finding that an original discovery recorded in it was being anticipated by a Swedish scientist he did not publish it, stating: "The episode has given a fresh and deep sense for my mind to the saying 'Man proposes, and God disposes'. The project that gave the first impetus to my inquiry has been dissipated into mist, and a new one, undesigned by me, has been accomplished in its place."

Ohm died in Munich in 1854, and is buried in the Alter Südfriedhof. A collection of his family letters would be compiled in a German book, which shows that he used to sign some of his letters with the expression "Gott befohlen, G S Ohm," meaning "Commended to God".

== Discovery of Ohm's law ==
Ohm's law first appeared (Note: Ohm's law, that electric current is proportional to a potential difference, was first discovered by Henry Cavendish, but Cavendish did not publish his electrical discoveries in his lifetime and they did not become known until 1879, long after Ohm had independently made the discovery and published himself. Thus the law came to bear the name of Ohm.) in the famous book Die galvanische Kette, mathematisch bearbeitet (The Galvanic Circuit Investigated Mathematically) (1827) in which he gave his complete theory of electricity. In this work, he stated his law for electromotive force acting between the extremities of any part of a circuit is the product of the strength of the current, and the resistance of that part of the circuit.

The book begins with the mathematical background necessary for an understanding of the rest of the work. While his work greatly influenced the theory and applications of current electricity, it was coldly received at that time. Ohm presents his theory as one of contiguous action, a theory which opposed the concept of action at a distance. Ohm believed that the communication of electricity occurred between "contiguous particles" which is the term he himself used. The paper is concerned with this idea, and in particular with illustrating the differences in this scientific approach of Ohm's and the approaches of Joseph Fourier and Claude-Louis Navier.

A study of the conceptual framework used by Ohm in producing Ohm's law has been presented by Thomas Archibald. The work of Ohm marked the early beginning of the subject of circuit theory, although this did not become an important field until the end of the century.

== Ohm's acoustic law ==
Ohm's acoustic law, sometimes called the acoustic phase law or simply Ohm's law, states that a musical sound is perceived by the ear as a set of a number of constituent pure harmonic tones. It is well known to be not quite true.

== Study and publications ==
His first paper in 1825 examined the decrease in the electromagnetic force produced by a wire as the length of the wire increased. In 1826, he gave a description of conduction in circuits modelled on Fourier's study of heat conduction. This paper continued Ohm's deduction of results from experimental evidence and, particularly in the second, he was able to propose laws which went a long way to explaining results of others working on galvanic electricity. The most important was his pamphlet published in Berlin in 1827, with the title Die galvanische Kette mathematisch bearbeitet. This work, the germ of which had appeared during the two preceding years in the journals of Schweigger and Poggendorff, has exerted an important influence on the development of the theory and applications of electric current. Ohm's name has been incorporated in the terminology of electrical science in Ohm's Law (which he first published in Die galvanische Kette...), the proportionality of current and voltage in a resistor, and adopted as the SI unit of resistance, the ohm (symbol Ω).

Although Ohm's work strongly influenced theory, at first it was received with little enthusiasm. However, his work was eventually recognized by the Royal Society with its award of the Copley Medal in 1841. He became a foreign member of the Royal Society in 1842, and in 1845 he became a full member of the Bavarian Academy of Sciences and Humanities. At some extent, Charles Wheatstone drew attention to the definitions which Ohm had introduced in the field of physics.

=== Works ===
- Grundlinien zu einer zweckmäßigen Behandlung der Geometrie als höheren Bildungsmittels an vorbereitenden Lehranstalten [Guidelines for an appropriate treatment of geometry in higher education at preparatory institutes] (in German). Palm und Enke. 1817 – via Google Books.
- Die galvanische Kette : mathematisch bearbeitet (in German). Berlin: T.H. Riemann. 1827 – via Google Books.
  - English translation: The Galvanic circuit investigated mathematically. Translated by Francis, William. New York: D. Van Nostrand Company. 1891 – via Google Books.
- Beiträge zur Molecular-Physik. Erster Band. Elemente der analytischen Geometrie im Raume am schiefwinkligen Coordinatensysteme [Contributions to molecular physics. First volume. Elements of analytic geometry concerning the skew coordinate system] (in German). Nürnberg: Schrag. 1849 – via Internet Archive.
- Erklärung aller in einaxigen Krystallplatten zwischen geradlinig polarisirstem Lichte wahrnehmbaren Interferenz-Erscheinungen in mathematischer Form mitgetheilt (in German). München: k. bayr. Akademie der Wissenschaften.
  - Erste Hälfte [First half], 1852 — via Munich Digitization Center
  - Zweite Hälfte [Second half], 1853 — via Google Books
- Grundzüge der Physik als Compendium zu seinen Vorlesungen [Fundamentals of physics: Compendium of lectures]. Nürnberg: Schrag.
  - Erste Abtheilung, Allgemeine Physik [Volume 1 General Physics], 1854 — via Google Books
  - Zweite Abtheilung, Besondere Physik [Volume 2 Special Physics], 1854 — via Google Books

== See also ==
- Ohm (unit)
