= Adolf Krazer =

German mathematician

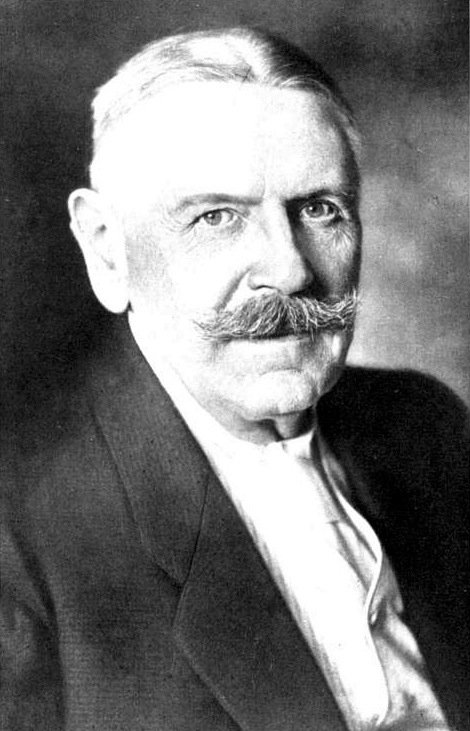
Adolf Krazer

Adolf Carl Josef Krazer (15 April 1858 in Zusmarshausen – 7 August 1926 in Karlsruhe) was a German mathematician.

== Publications ==
- Krazer, Adolf (1970) [1903], Lehrbuch der Thetafunktionen, Providence, R.I.: American Mathematical Society, ISBN 978-0-8284-0244-6
