= Ludwig Maurer =

German mathematician

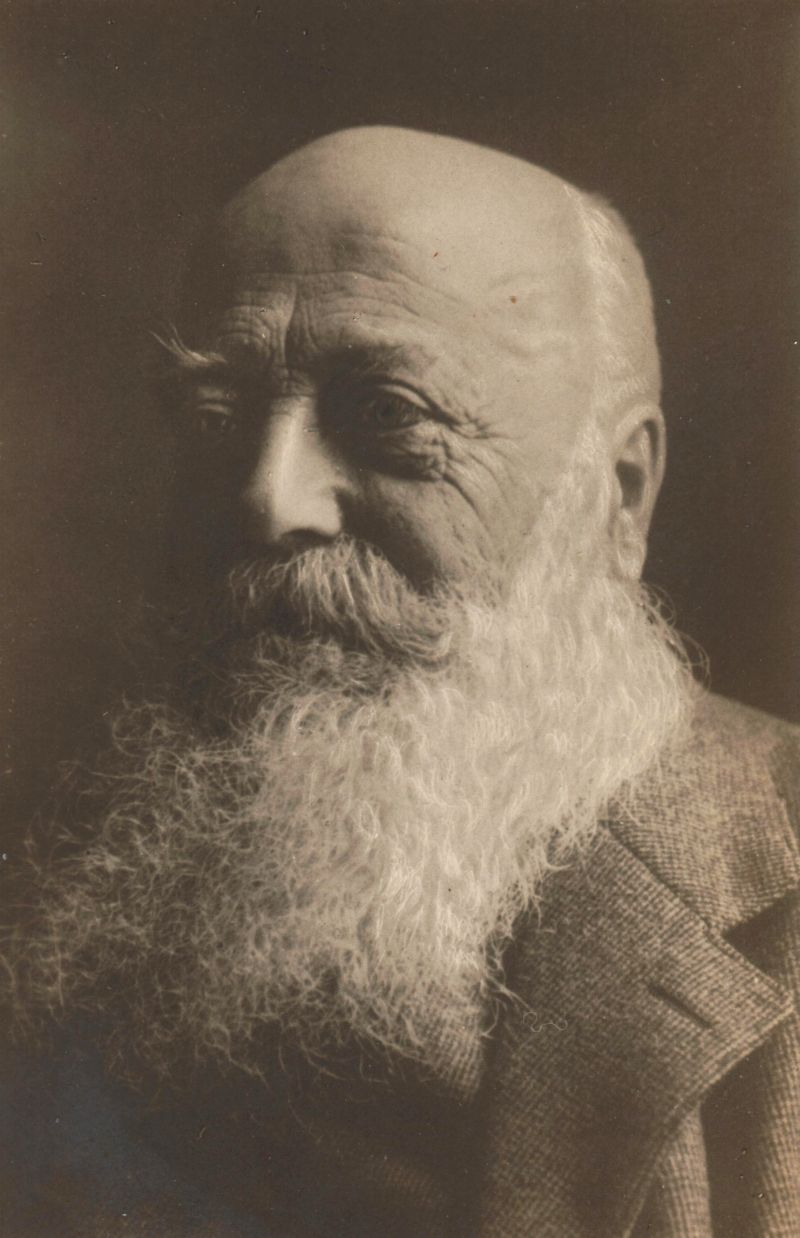
Ludwig Maurer

Ludwig Maurer (11 December 1859 – 10 January 1927) was a German mathematician and professor at University of Tübingen. He was the eldest son of Konrad Maurer (1823–1902) and Valerie Maurer, née von Faulhaber (1833–1912). His 1887 dissertation at the University of Strassburg was on the theory of linear substitutions, known today as matrix groups. A survey of his important contributions is contained in chapter V, §4 of (Borel 2001).

== See also ==
- Maurer–Cartan form
