= Wöhrder Wiese station =

Metro station in Nuremberg, Germany

Wöhrder Wiese
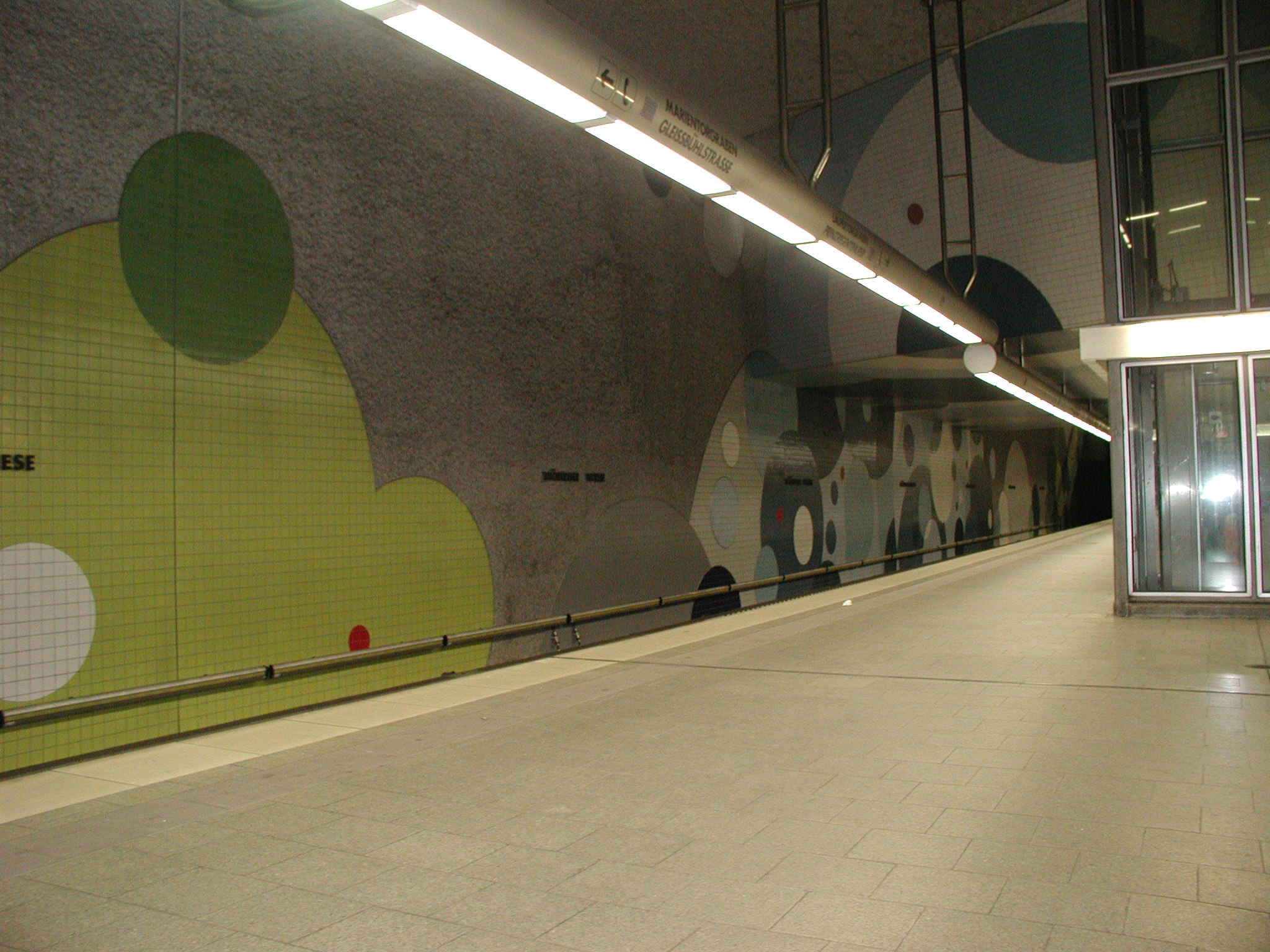

General information
- Location: Franz-Josef-Strauß-Brücke; 90489 Nürnberg, Germany
- Coordinates: 49.4522473°N 11.0869448°E
- System: Nuremberg U-Bahn station
- Operator: Verkehrs-Aktiengesellschaft Nürnberg
- Connections: Tram: (Bayernstraße) – Tristanstraße – Erlenstegen

Construction
- Structure type: Underground

Other information
- Fare zone: VGN: 100

History
- Opened: 29 September 1990

Services
Preceding station	Nuremberg U-Bahn	Following station
Nürnberg Hbf towards Röthenbach	U2	Rathenauplatz towards Flughafen
Nürnberg Hbf towards Großreuth bei Schweinau	U3	Rathenauplatz towards Nordwestring
Location

Wöhrder Wiese station is a Nuremberg U-Bahn station, located on the U2 and U3
