= Karl Christian von Langsdorf =

German scientist and engineer

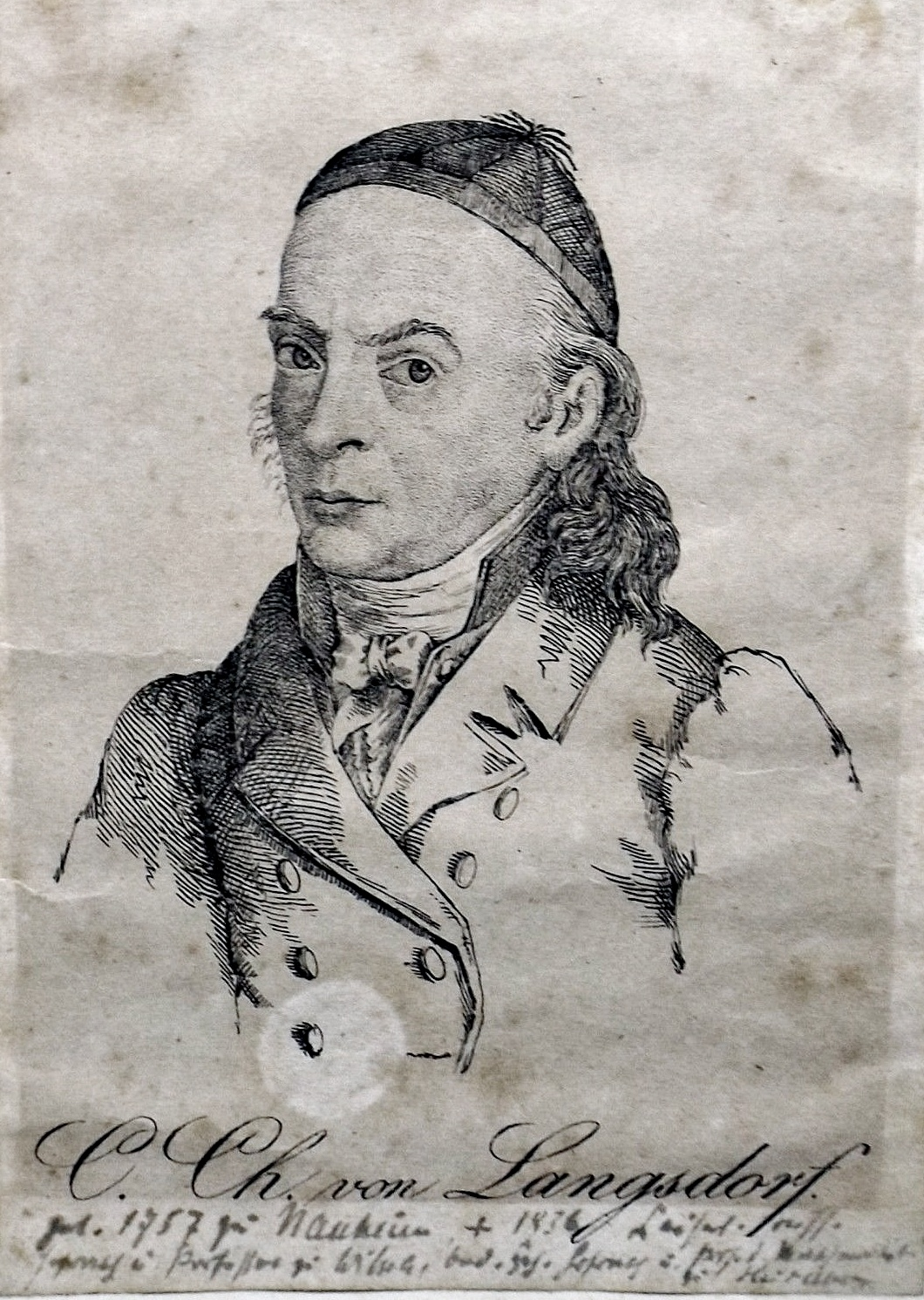
Karl Christian von Langsdorf

Karl Christian von Langsdorf, also known as Carl Christian von Langsdorff (18 May 1757 in Nauheim – 10 June 1834 in Heidelberg), was a German mathematician, geologist, natural scientist and engineer.

== Life ==
Langsdorf was the son of Georg Melchior Langsdorff and Maria Margarethe Koch. His father was saltworks archivist and Hesse-Kassel Rentmeister (master of the bursary) (saltworks of Nauheim). He had a twin brother named Daniel Isaak. After finishing Gymnasium (secondary school) in Idstein in 1773, Langsdorf studied, among other things, philosophy, law, and mathematics at University of Göttingen from 1774 until autumn of 1776 with Abraham Gotthelf Kästner and then until 1777 at the University of Giessen. He then interned at the saltworks in Salzhausen, near Nidda, and subsequently devoted himself in Nidda, Hesse to the study of saltworks. He finished his doctorate in 1781 in Erfurt.

In the summer semester of 1781, he was an outside lecturer at Giessen. For health reasons however, he decided against an academic career. He pursued a career in administration and became Rentmeister and land judge in Mülheim an der Ruhr. Starting in 1784, he was active as a saltworks inspector in Gerabronn (near Rothenburg ob der Tauber), which belonged to the margravate of Ansbach at the time.

In 1798, he was given a full professorship in mechanical engineering at Erlangen. He taught there until 1804 and he subjected the 15-year-old Georg Ohm to a thorough examination of his knowledge of mathematics. Ohm and his younger brother were instructed in mathematics by their father.

He refused an offer from Heidelberg in 1803 and accepted an offer to teach mathematics and technology at Vilnius University. In the Russian Empire, he and his family were elevated into the hereditary aristocracy. In 1806, he returned with the aristocratic descriptor von and became (with the help of his older brother Gottlieb, the governor of Dilsberg) full professor in Heidelberg.

The mathematical physics class of the Bavarian Academy of Sciences admitted him to its ranks as a non-local member in 1808. Langsdorf left the University of Erlangen in early 1809 to take up a post in the University of Heidelberg. Karl Christian von Langsdorff had been a professor of mathematics at Heidelberg from 1806 to 1834.(He is relative with mathematician Christian Hugo Eduard Study) Langsdorf was also very interested in theological questions and published several works on this topic. His brother, Johann Wilhelm, made a name for himself as a specialist in the area of saltworks engineering.

== Students ==
- Martin Ohm
- Christian Ernst Wendt
- Georg Ohm

== Selected works ==
In German

- Erläuterungen der Kästnerschen Analysis endlicher Größen, 1776–1777
- Drey oekonomisch-physikalisch-mathematische Abhandlungen, 1785
- Physisch-mathematische Abhandlungen über Gegenstände der Wärmelehre, 1796
- Handbuch der Maschinenlehre für Praktiker und akademische Lehrer, 1797
- Lehrbuch der Hydraulik mit beständiger Rücksicht auf die Erfahrung, 1794–1796
- Der Strumpfwirkerstuhl und sein Gebrauch, 1805
- Erläuterung höchstwichtiger Lehren der Technologie, 1807
- Principia calculi differentialis a fundamentis novis iisque solidioribus deducta (= Neue und gründlichere Darstellung der Prinzipien der Differentialrechnung), 1807
- Über Newtons, Eulers, Kästners und Konsorten Pfuschereien in der Mathematik, 1807
- Arithmetische Abhandlungen über juristische, staats- und forstwirthschaftliche Fragen, Mortalität, Bevölkerung und chronologische Bestimmungen, 1810

== Literature ==
In German

- Walter Volk: Karl Christian von Langsdorf, Philippsburg i.B. 1934; his life and works.
- Dagmar Drüll: Carl Christian Langsdorf, Heidelberger Gelehrtenlexikon, Vol. 2, Heidelberg 1803–1932, 1986; p. 155–156.
- ADB, Entry on Georg Simon Ohm, Vol. 24, p. 187.
- ADB: Günther: Karl Christian von Langsdorf, Vol. 17, p. 691–692.
