= Winterer =

Winterer is a surname. Notable people with this surname include:

- Anne Winterer (1894–1938), German photographer
- Caroline Winterer, American historian
- Georg Winterer (born 1961), German entrepreneur and neuroscientist
