= Carl von Häberlin =

German painter

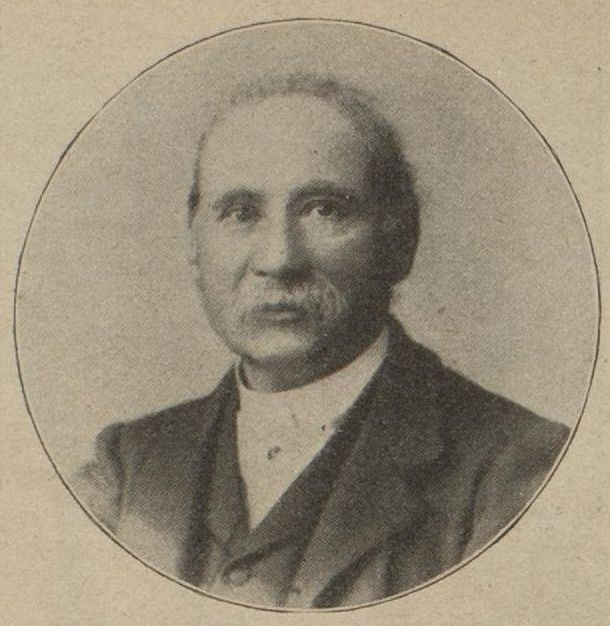
Carl von Häberlin (date unknown)

Carl von Häberlin (16 December 1832 – 13 April 1911) was a German painter and illustrator.

== Life ==
He was born in Oberesslingen. He received his first lessons at the Stuttgart Kunstschule, then attended the Kunstakademie Düsseldorf from 1852 to 1856, where he studied under Theodor Hildebrandt and Wilhelm von Schadow. His first paintings were military scenes. In 1860, he pursued further studies with Karl Theodor von Piloty at the Academy of Fine Arts, Munich and expanded his thematic material, although still focusing on historical subjects.

Following a two-year study trip to Italy in 1864, he returned to Stuttgart, where he continued to paint scenes from history (now including Italy), and worked as an illustrator. From 1868 to 1883, he was a Professor of genre painting at the Kunstschule.

From 1878 to 1894, he spent the warmer months in Konstanz, working on twenty-six large scale murals at a hotel which had once been a monastery on Dominicans Island. These murals depicted the history of the island, through the beginnings of the hotel in 1874, and replaced an earlier set of Biblical frescoes. During his last two years working there, he also created frescoes for the Castell Castle in nearby Tägerwilen.

In 1901, Häberlin received the Ehrenkreuz of the Order of the Crown (Württemberg), which conferred a title of nobility. He died in 1911 in Stuttgart.

== Selected paintings ==
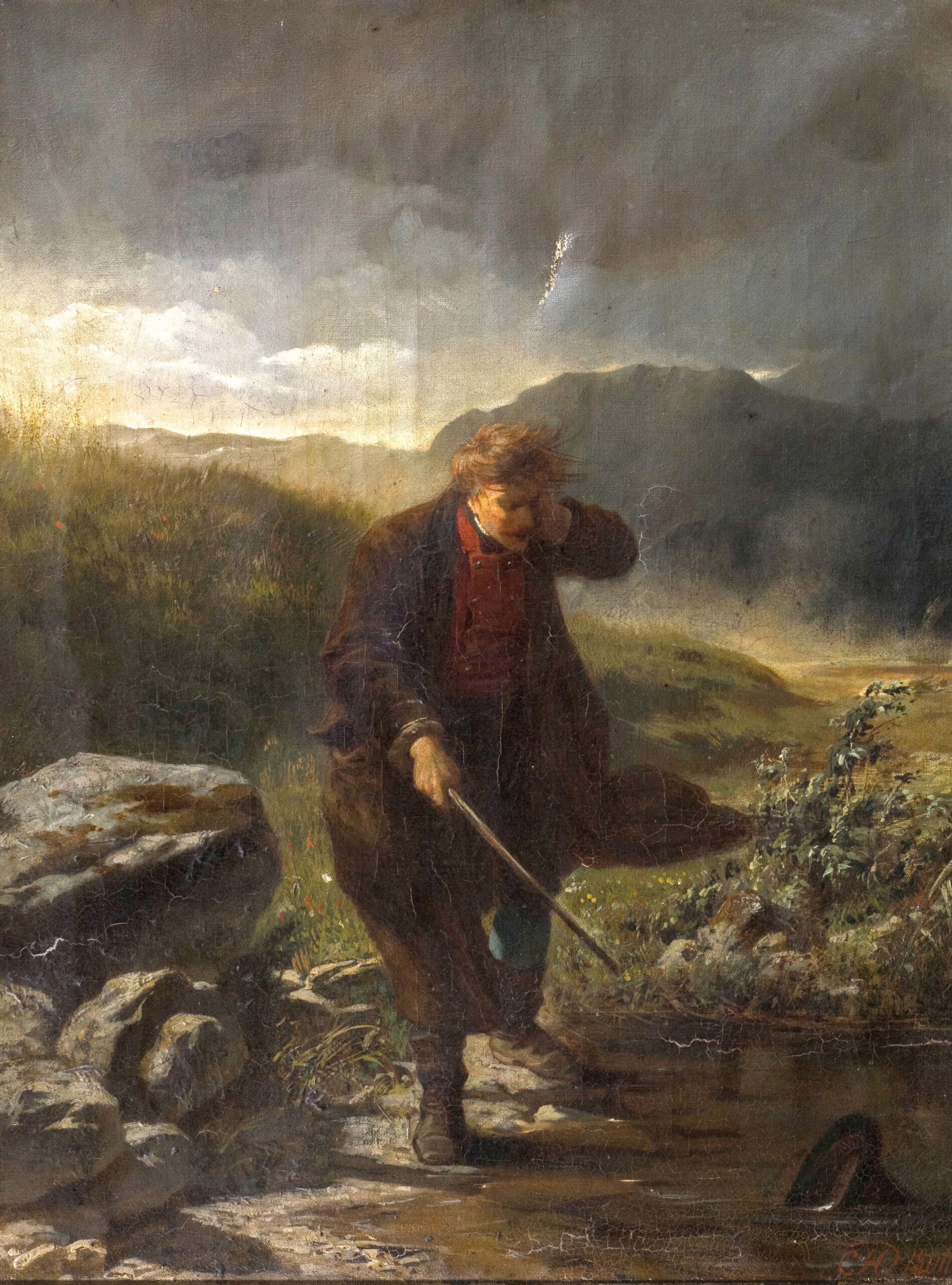
Thunderstorm

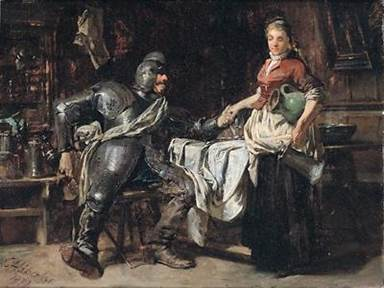
The Knight and the Maid

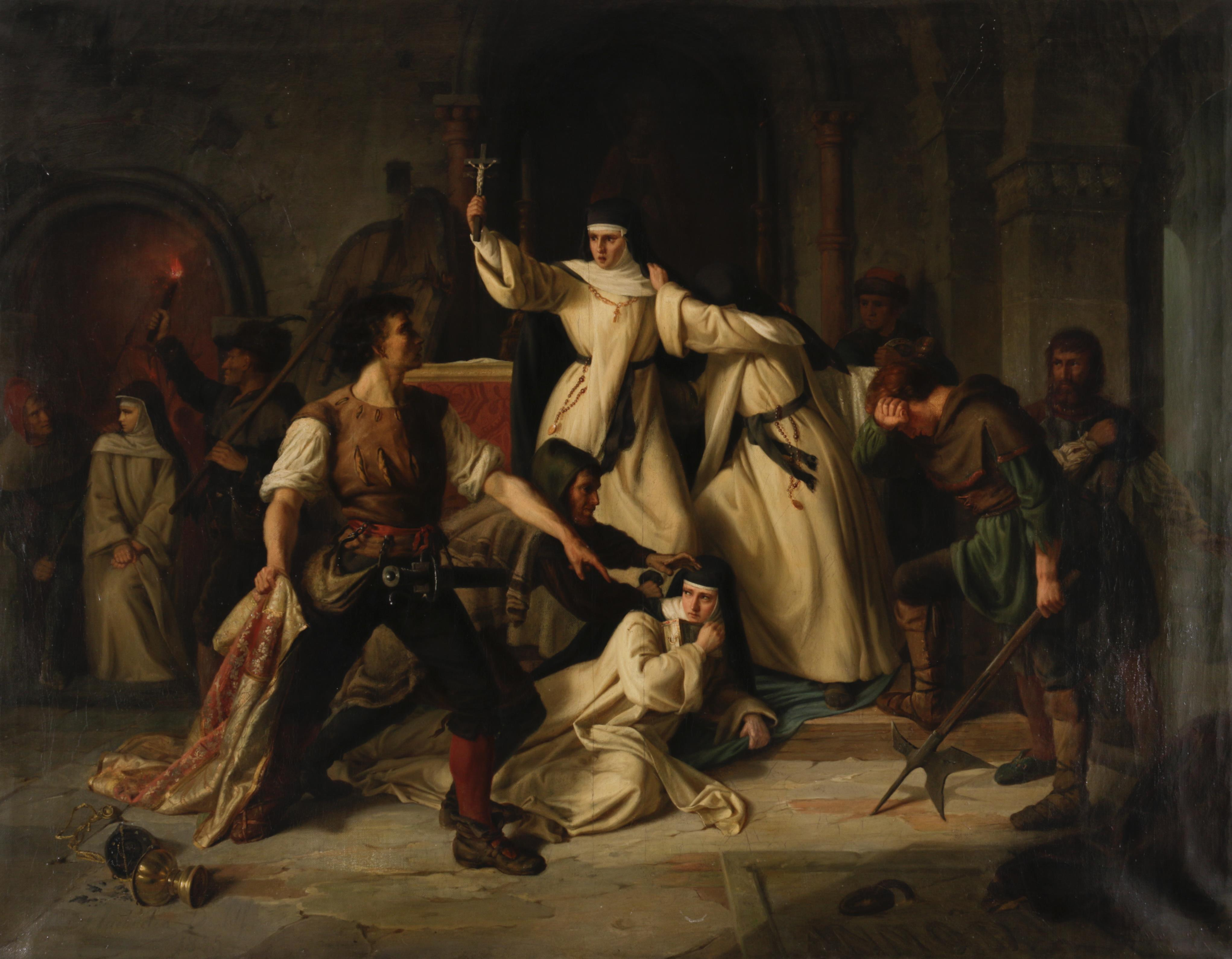
Scene from the Peasants' War

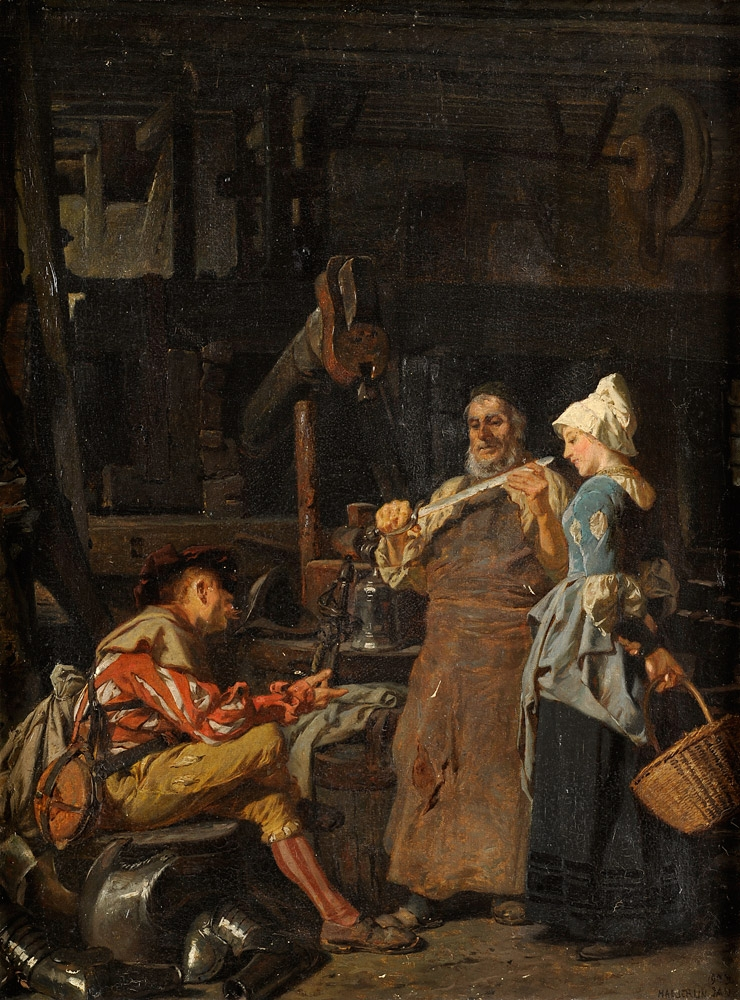
At the Bladesmith's
