= Castell Castle =

Castle in Tägerwilen, Switzerland

Coordinates: 47°38′44″N 9°07′59″E

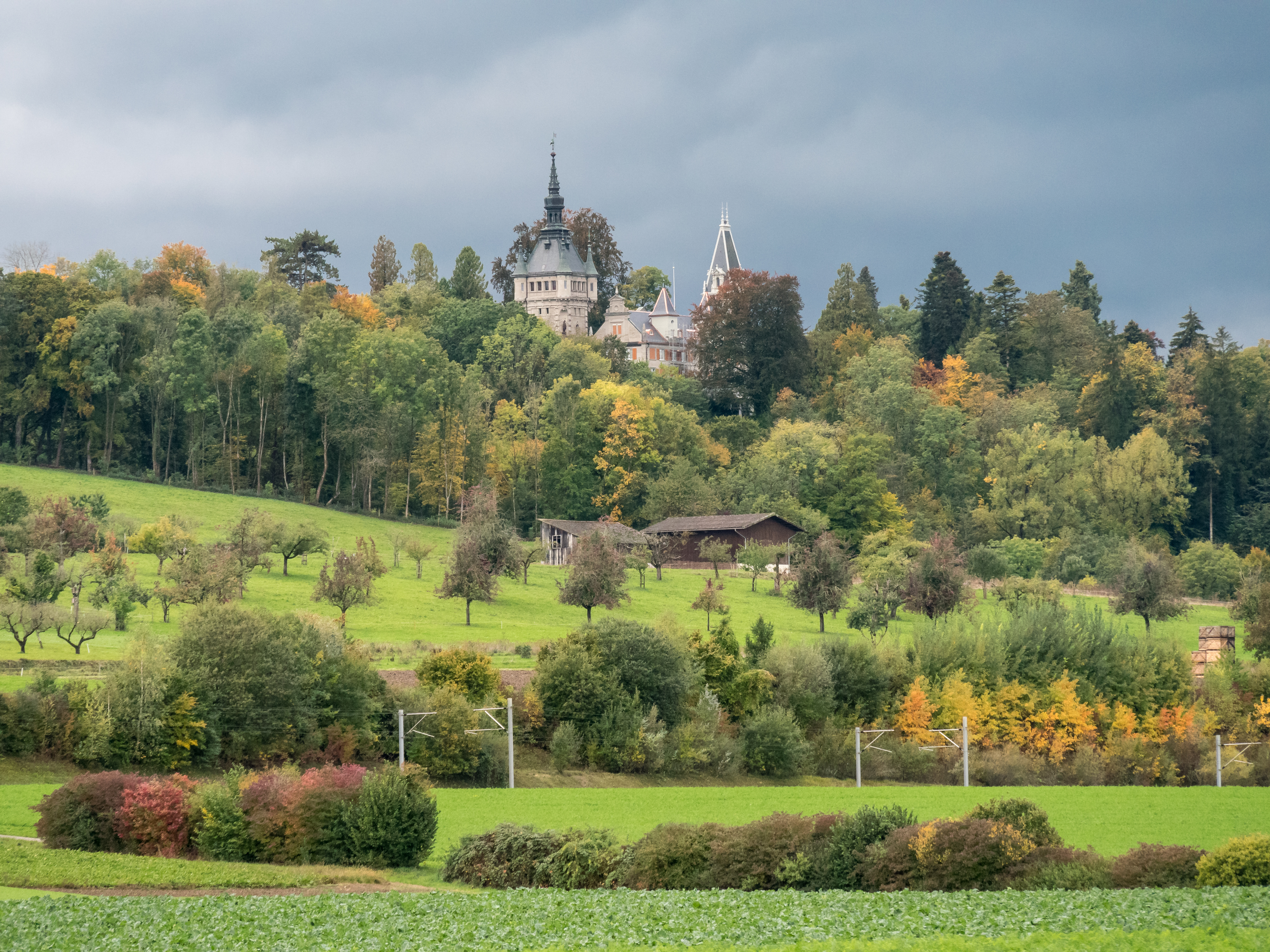
Castell Tägerwilen

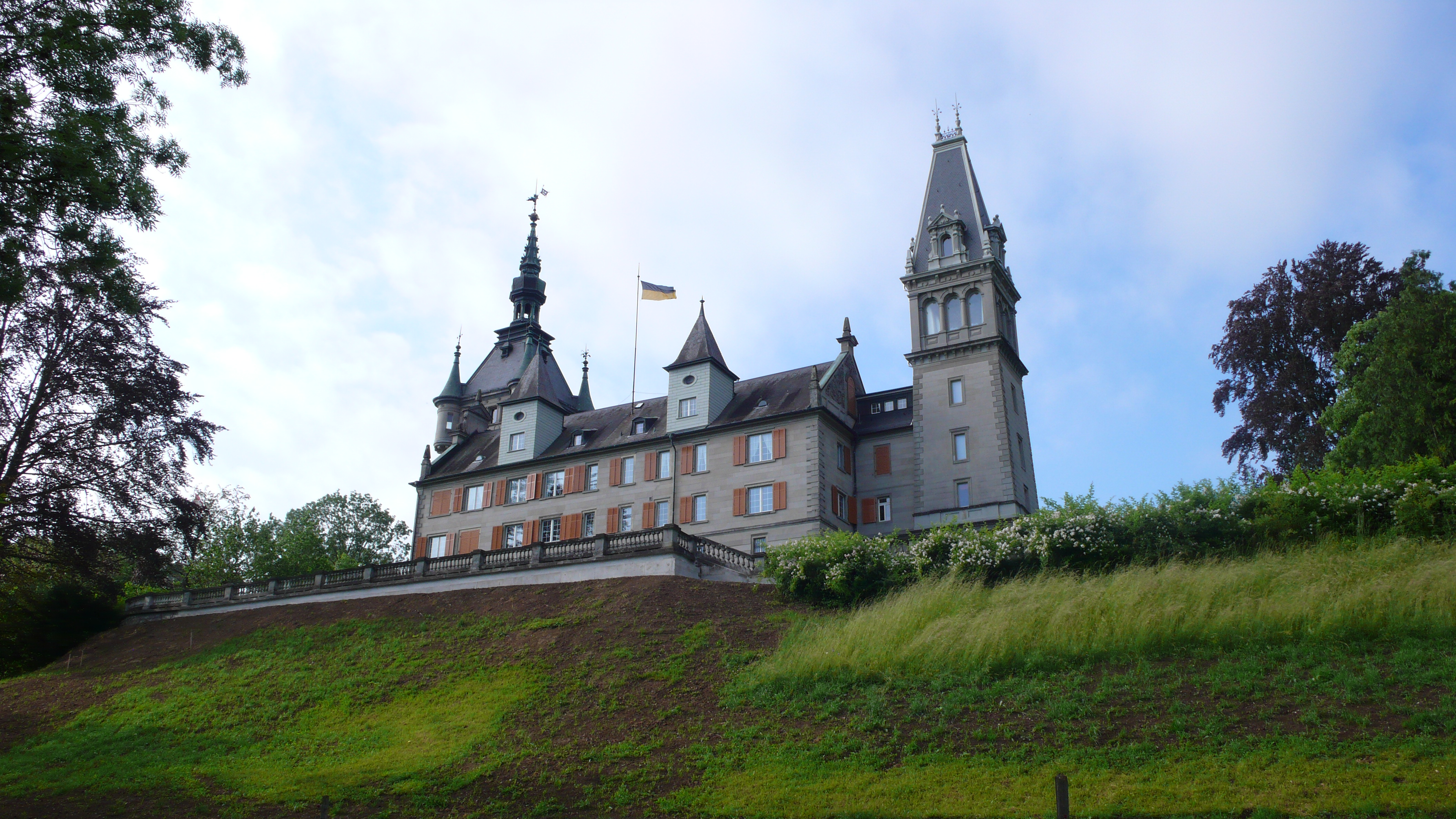
Castell Castle, north side

Castell Castle is a castle in the municipality of Tägerwilen of the Canton of Thurgau in Switzerland. It is a Swiss heritage site of national significance. East of the present-day castle can be found the ruins of the 12th-century Castell Castle, one of the largest defensive structures from the medieval period in the Lake Constance area.

== History ==
Castell Castle, also known as Upper Castell (Ober-Castell), overlooks the village of Tägerwilen from a vantage point on the Thurgau Seerücken ridge. It dates back to the time of the Junker Konrad, Vogt (advocatus) of Wartenfels, an inhabitant of Konstanz, who in 1585 replaced an existing farmhouse with a manor house in late Renaissance style; this still forms the heart of the castle complex today. Before 1635, the castle passed into the possession of Beat Jakob Segesser von Brunegg, the Obervogt of Klingnau and Arbon. In 1661 the estate changed hands again, this time passing to the brothers Zollikofer von Altenklingen of St. Gallen, who had the castle remodelled in 1725.

In 1790 the castle came into the possession of Daniel von Scherer of St. Gallen. For four weeks in 1871 the castle was used to accommodate 506 members of Bourbaki's Armée de l'Est. A descendant of Daniel von Scherer, Baron Maximilian (Max) von Scherer-Scherburg (1848–1901), engaged the architect Emil Otto Tafel between 1878 and 1894 to redesign the castle in Neo-Renaissance style. Between 1892 und 1894 the building was also painted with frescoes by Carl von Häberlin, depicting various episodes from the castle's history. Of the castle's interior decoration, the replica "Moorish hall", styled after a hall in Granada's Alhambra, is worthy of mention.

The von Stockar-Scherer-Castell family inherited the castle in 1901, and it still belongs to the fourth generation of this family at present. The castle's economic basis is provided by agriculture and forestry on its 160-hectare estate.

Castell Castle is not publicly accessible, but can be clearly viewed at several angles from the nearby public road. The castle's pond, the woods around it, and the nearby ruins of the older (12th-century) Castell Castle are all accessible to the public.

== See also ==
- List of castles in Switzerland

== Literature (in German) ==
- Society for Art History in Switzerland (ed.): Kunstführer durch die Schweiz. Vol. 1. Bern 2005, ISBN 3-906131-95-5.
- Harald Derschka: Die Ministerialen des Hochstiftes Konstanz (Konstanzer Arbeitskreis für Mittelalterliche Geschichte: Vorträge und Forschungen; special volume 45). Thorbecke, Stuttgart 1999, ISBN 3-7995-6755-0, pp. 125–139.
- Michael Losse, Ilga Koch: Schlösser und Burgen am westlichen Bodensee. Wartberg Verlag, Gudensberg-Gleichen 2004, ISBN 3-8313-1448-9, p. 74.
- Wolfgang Kramer, Franz Hofmann (eds.): Kunstschätze in Konstanz, Kreuzlingen und Umgebung. Verlag Michael Greuter, Hilzingen 2009, ISBN 3-938566-11-6. p. 119.
- Michael Weithmann: Burgen und Schlösser rund um den Bodensee. Tyrolia-Verlag, Innsbruck 2008, ISBN 978-3-7022-2922-1.
