= Konstanz-Petershausen station =

Railway station in Konstanz, Germany

Konstanz-Petershausen
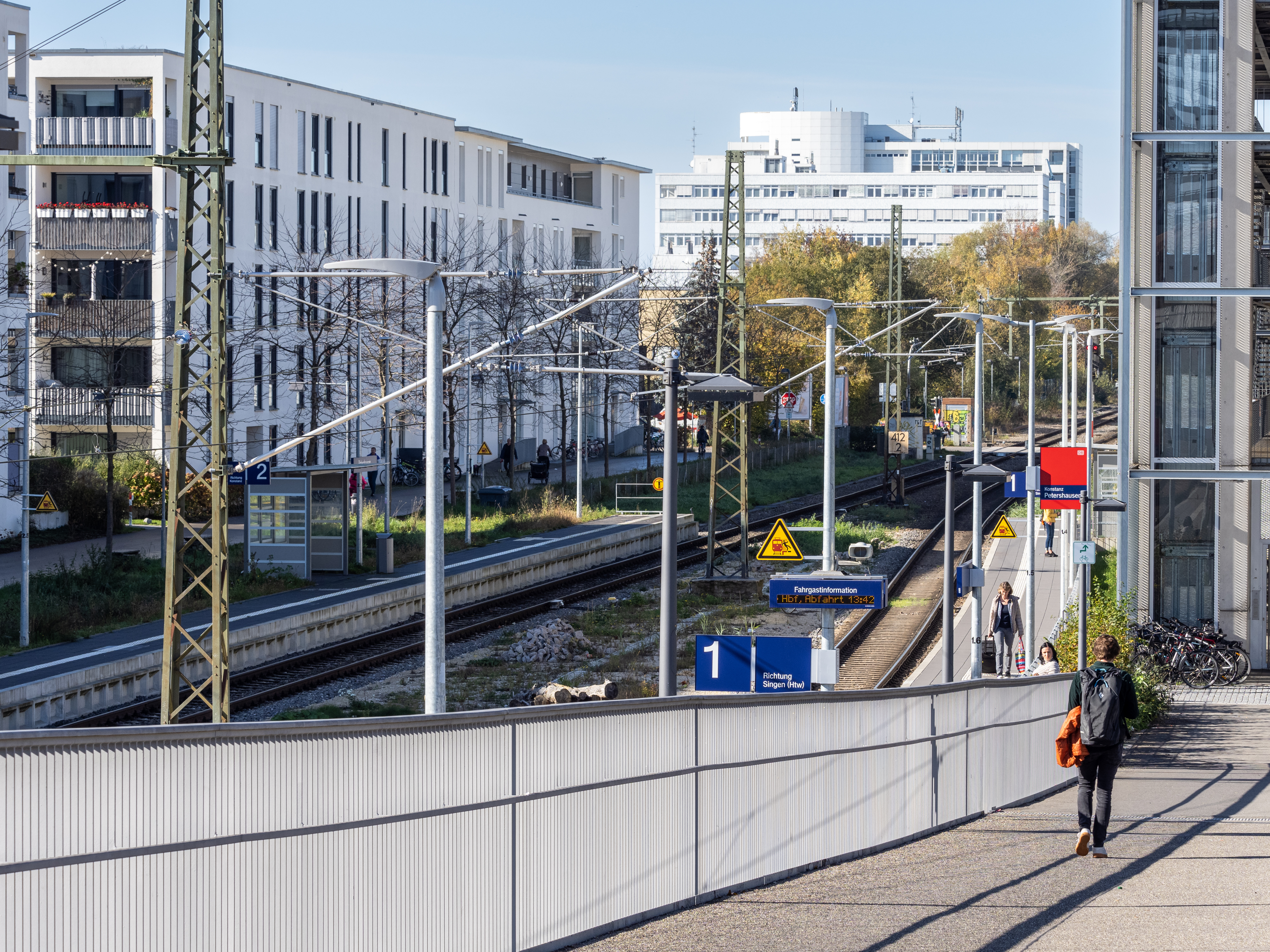
- The station in 2022

General information
- Location: Konstanz, Baden-Württemberg; Germany
- Coordinates: 47°40′27″N 9°10′24″E
- Owner: DB Netz
- Lines: High Rhine Railway (KBS 720)
- Platforms: 2 side platforms
- Tracks: 2
- Train operators: SBB GmbH
- Connections: Stadtbus Konstanz

Other information
- Fare zone: 5 (Verkehrsverbund Hegau-Bodensee)

Services
Preceding station	DB Regio Baden-Württemberg	Following station
Allensbach towards Karlsruhe Hbf	RE 2	Konstanz Terminus
Preceding station	SBB Deutschland	Following station
Konstanz-Fürstenberg towards Engen	S6	Konstanz Terminus
Location

Konstanz-Petershausen station (German: Bahnhof Konstanz-Petershausen) is a railway station in the city of Konstanz, Baden-Württemberg, Germany. It is situated in the Petershausen district along the standard gauge High Rhine Railway of Deutsche Bahn. It is served by regional trains only.

== Services ==
The station is called at by the Seehas, a named train which is part of Bodensee S-Bahn, and a RE. As of the December 2023 timetable change, the following services stop at Konstanz-Petershausen:

- DB Regio Baden-Württemberg RE 2: hourly train between Konstanz and Karlsruhe Hbf, via Singen (Hohentwiel)
- SBB GmbH S6: half-hourly service between Engen and Konstanz, via Singen (Hohentwiel)
