= Werner Berger =

German politician (1901–1964)

Werner Alfred Berger
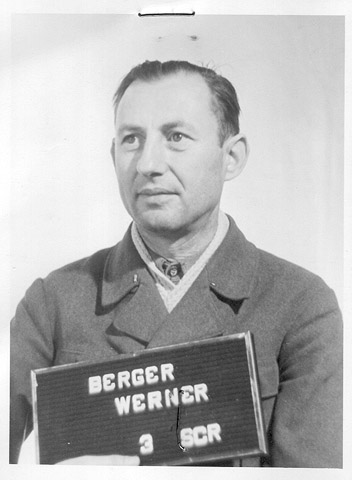
- Werner Berger in April 1947
- Born: 22 February 1901; Konstanz, German Empire
- Died: 10 June 1964 (aged 63); Rottweil, West Germany
- Occupation: Military
- Status: Deceased
- Conviction: War crimes
- Trial: Dachau trials
- Penalty: Life imprisonment

Werner Alfred Berger (22 February 1901 – 10 June 1964) was a German SS-Oberscharführer and served as a commander in the KZ Buchenwald concentration camp.

== Life ==
Berger worked as a banker and joined the Nazi Party before the outbreak of World War II. In April 1940 he joined the Waffen-SS. From January 1941 until April 1945 Berger served on the staff at KZ Buchenwald. At Buchenwald, Berger was in charge of the effect chamber, where the personal possessions of prisoners were stored. He also belonged to the group "Kommando 99", which carried out executions at Buchenwald against predominantly Soviet prisoners of war.

At the end of the war, Berger was arrested and on 25 November 1947, was accused, along with five other Buchenwald personnel, of committing war crimes while a part of Kommando 99 in the Dachau trials (which followed the Buchenwald Trial). On 3 December 1947, Berger was sentenced to life in prison for his roles at Buchenwald and Kommando 99. After the trial Berger was transferred to Landsberg Prison.

Berger was also accused in the assassination of Ernst Thälmann while at Buchenwald. However, the events surrounding Thälmann's murder on 18 August 1944 were never explained. Former Buchenwald prisoner Marian Zgoda stated in the Buchenwald Trial that he witnessed Erich Gust, Wolfgang Otto, and Werner Berger all take part in the shooting of Thälmann. Otto had been accused and convicted of crimes against Allied personnel in the main Buchenwald trial. Gust had gone into hiding under an assumed name.

Due to Zagoda's testimony, on 13 November 1948 arrest warrants were made by the court of Weimar against Otto, Berger, Gust and other implicated individuals. In 1950, after consultation with the GDR authorities, the Soviet Control Commission unsuccessfully applied to the responsible American authorities for the extradition of Berger and Otto in order to carry out a trial for Thälmann's murder.

Berger was released early from the Landsberg Prison for war criminals in 1954. He then found a job at a bank and finally rose to branch manager at the state central bank in Baden-Württemberg. In 1962, Thälmann's widow, Rosa Thälmann, filed a complaint against the alleged Thälmann murderers, Otto and Berger, with the help of the lawyer Friedrich Karl Kaul at the Cologne public prosecutor's office. The investigation was ultimately unsuccessful. Berger died in June 1964.

== Literature ==
- Falco Werkentin: Politische Strafjustiz in der Ära Ulbricht. Christoph Links-Verlag, Berlin 1995, ISBN 3-86153-069-4. (in German)

== Literature ==
- Falco Werkentin: Politische Strafjustiz in der Ära Ulbricht. Christoph Links-Verlag, Berlin 1995, ISBN 3-86153-069-4.
