= Dominicans Island =

Island in Lake Constance near Konstanz, Germany

Native name: Dominikanerinsel
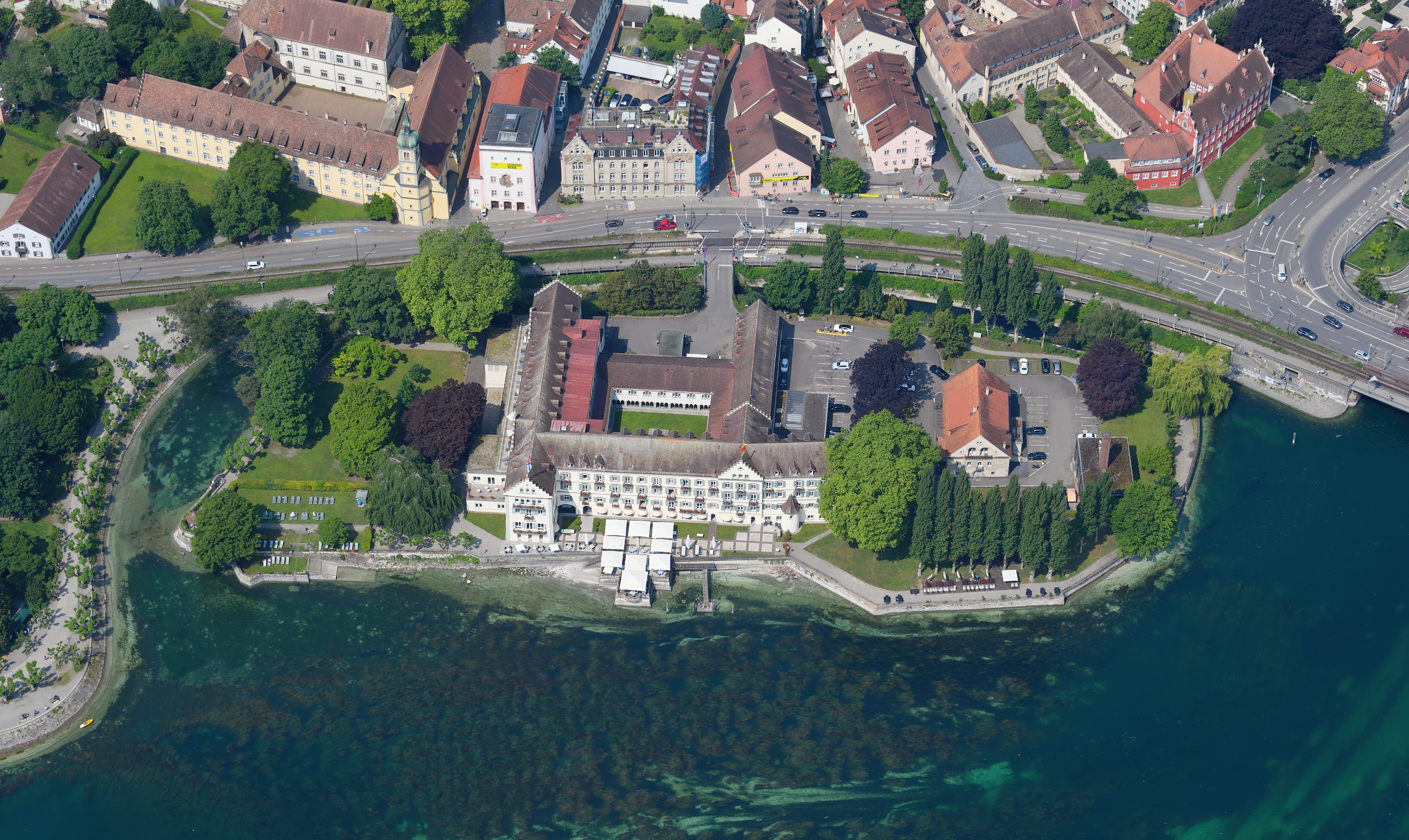
- Aerial view of Dominicans Island
- Interactive map of Dominicans Island

Geography
- Coordinates: 47°39′51″N 9°10′42″E
- Area: 0.018318 km^{2} (0.007073 sq mi)
- Length: 0.246 km (0.1529 mi)
- Width: 0.100 km (0.0621 mi)

Administration
- Germany
- State: Baden-Württemberg
- Landkreis: Konstanz
- Große Kreisstadt: Constance

Demographics
- Population: 21

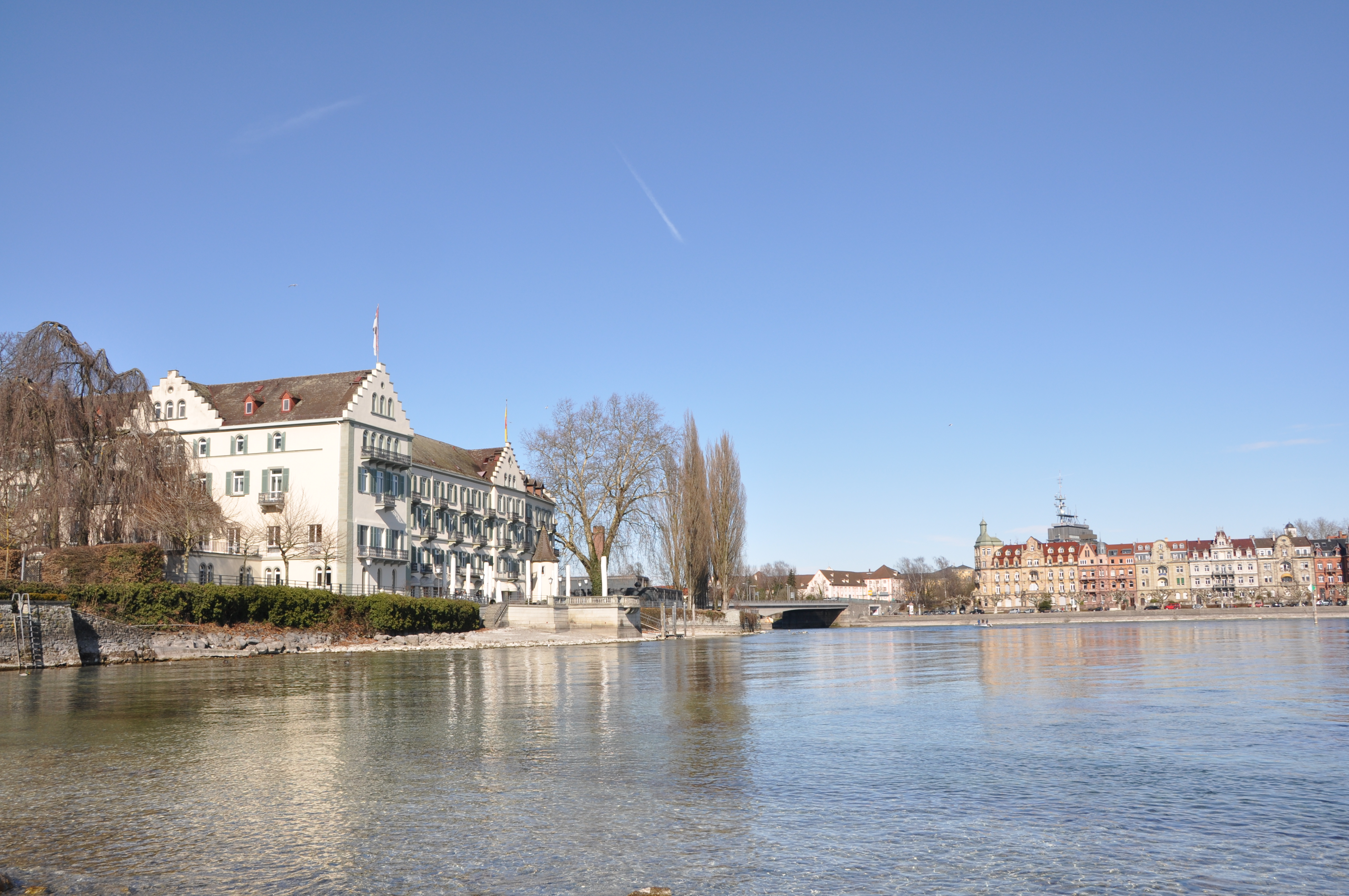
Dominican Island on the left, with Steigenberger island hotel; the Old Rhine Bridge is visible in the centre of the image

The Dominican Island or Constance Island (German: Dominikanerinsel or Konstanzer Insel) is an island in Lake Constance immediately east of the city of Constance. With an area of 1.8 hectares, it is one of the smaller islands in the lake. The island is separated from the city center by a six-metre-wide (20 ft) channel, and connected to it by a bridge. The island is dominated by the Steigenberger hotel, which is housed in the former Dominican convent.

== Geography ==
The Dominican Island, 246 m long from north to south and up to 100 m wide.

The channel that separates the island from the mainland is 210 m long, but only 6 m wide. The channel is on the western side of the island; opposite the island is the Niederburg section of the old city center. The channel used to be much wider and was partially filled for the construction of the railway line. The island is barely recognizable as such because the narrow channel is visible only to pedestrians walking on the wharf along the old waterfront. The Constance railway station and the port are about 600 m south of the bridge. The road to the railway station leads past the city park.

In the south, the swan pond lies between the island and the city park. The city parks sits on a piece of the lake that was filled in during 1880. Even after this water was filled in, the Swan Pond is not completely surrounded by land. In the northwest, the pond abuts the city canal; is the southeast, the pond is separated from the open lake by a 15 m wide bottleneck. This compound falls dry at low tide. The Swan Pond is almost 90 m long and up to 30 m wide, it covers an area of about 1,800 square feet.

The northern tip of the island is located 30 m from the Old Rhine Bridge, at the point where the Seerhein flows out of the Upper Lake towards the Lower Lake. The chapter house is located to the north of the main building. The hotel car park separates the two buildings.

To the east of the island is the Constance Hopper part of Lake Constance. Here we find the famous terrace of the hotel's restaurant, as well as, further south, the hotel's lido and recreation lawn. At the southern end of the lawn, there is a pavilion.

In the central building of the hotel, we find the grave of Manuel Chrysoloras, who died here during the Council of Constance.

The island belongs to urban district Altstadt ("Old Town"). On 31 December 2008, 21 people reported having their principal residence on Dominican Island.

== University of Konstanz ==
The University of Constance was founded in 1966 and was initially housed in the south wing of the convent building. The south wing was the temporary seat of the university, which was spread out to various buildings in several parts of the city, until the newly commissioned buildings on the Giesberg were ready. Even today, the hotel building is frequently used for lectures and meetings of the University of Constance and for events organized by the Constance European Colloquium.

== History ==
=== Early history ===
At the southwest of Lake Constance and in the present city of Constance, the remains of a Neolithic village have been found at some distance from the shore. Such finds have also been made in the swan pond between the southern shore of the Dominican island and the city park created in 1880. Fragments and wood were discovered, and traces of stilt houses. They were dated between the fifth and the third millennium BCE.

Other shore settlements in the Constance Hopper, also stilt houses were dated to the Neolithic period around 2200 BC to 1800 BC.

At the end of the second Century BCE Celtic people lived in fishing settlements on the territory of Constance and on the Dominican island.

=== Roman History ===
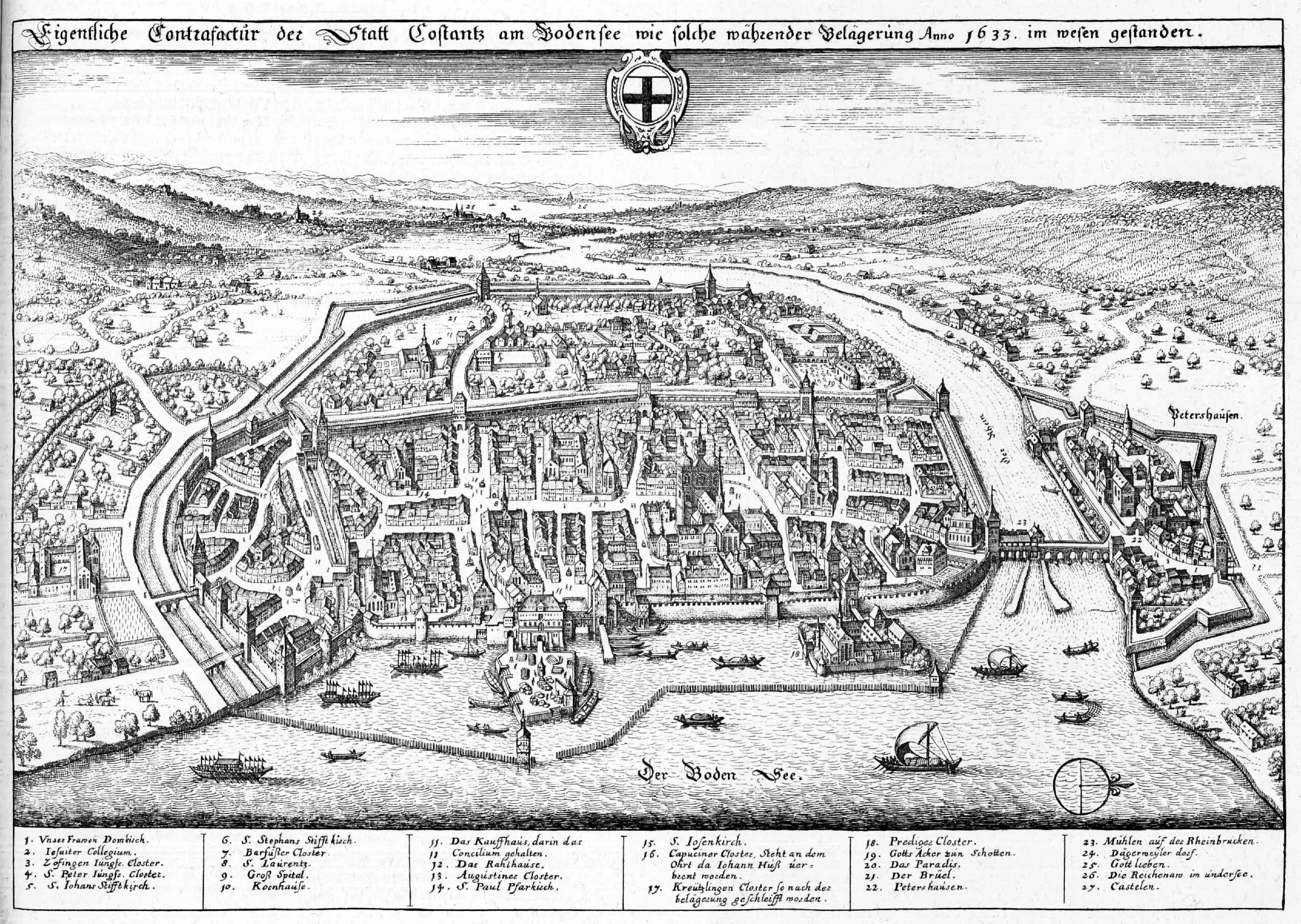
In this engraving by Merian of 1633, the Dominican island with the monastic buildings can be recognized in the right foreground. At that time, the island was nearly square and could be reached using narrow bridge leading to a tower of the city wall

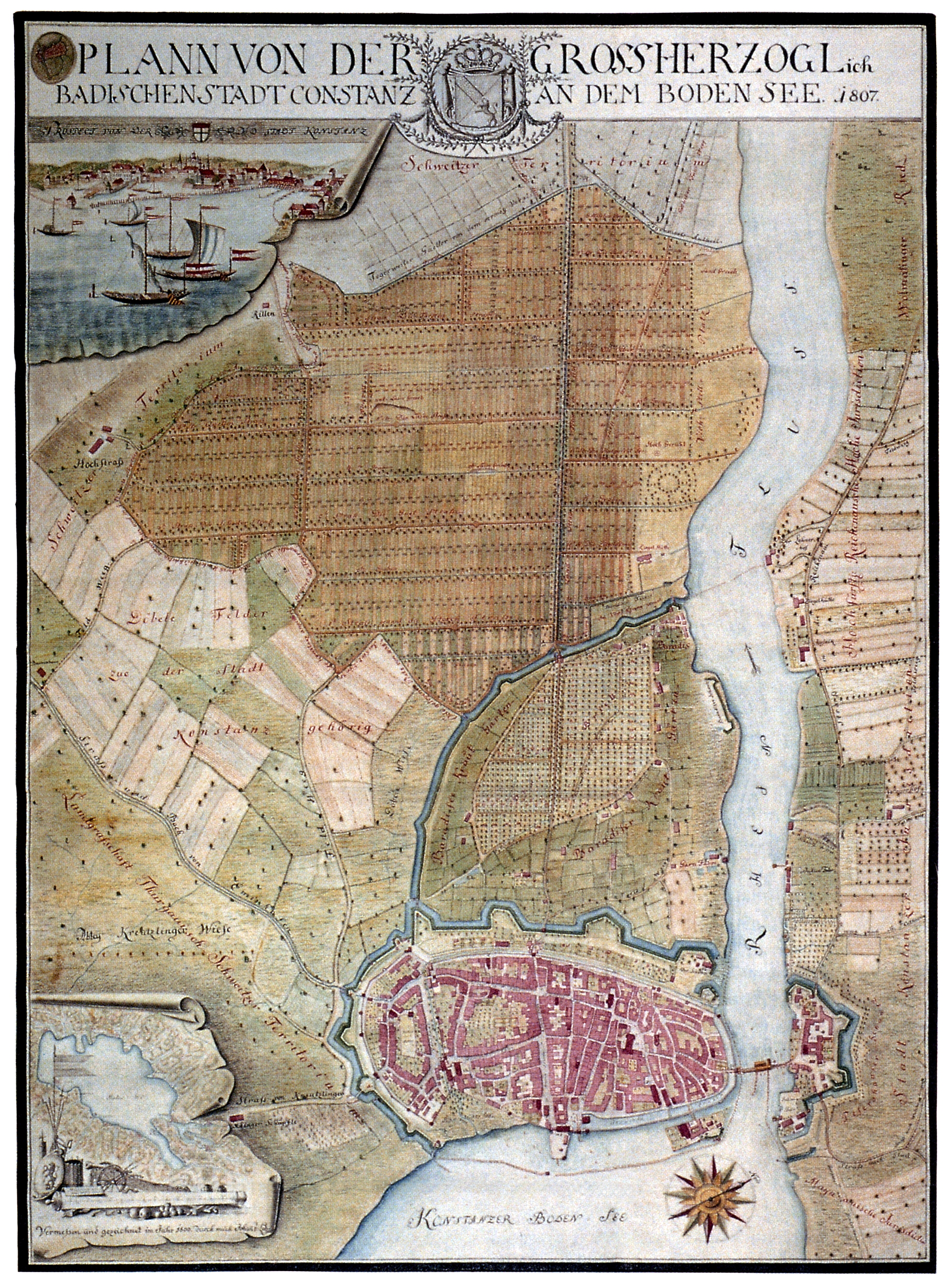
Map of Constance from 1807, with Dominican Island in the bottom right (north is right)

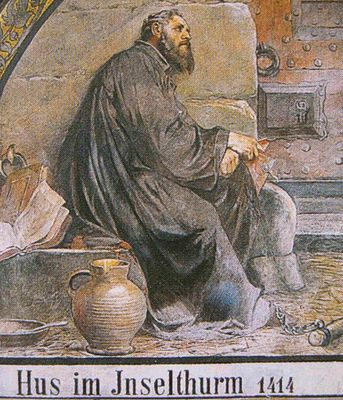
Wall painting by Carl von Häberlin of Jan Hus in the island tower in 1414

The Roman rule in the area around Lake Constance started in the year 15 CE with the conquest of Augustus. The Celtic oppidum was destroyed. The area then belonged to the province Raetia until the end of Roman rule around the year 400.

In the year 207, Emperor Severus sent governor Constantine into the area. Constantine set up his headquarters in Pfyn in today's Thurgau. He also set up a well-fortified hunting lodge on Dominican Island. He granted freedom of trade, which led to settlement forming around his hunting lodge, forming an additional layer of protection against his enemies, who included Alman von Stoffen, a Hungarian ruler, and an early Bavarian Duke. Although one could consider this Roman settlement as the earliest beginning of the City of Constance, the city was not named after this Constantine, but a 4th century emperor. Constantine was killed in an accident with a frightened horse and his enemies destroyed the castle and drove away most of the inhabitants of the island.

The castle was probably rebuilt subsequently. However, when the Alemanni expelled the Romans in the late 4th and early 5th centuries, the castle was destroyed again, so people would not be reminded of the hated Roman rule.

=== Early Middle Ages ===
Little is known about the history of the island during this period. According to legend, the island is home to a castle of Merovingian have.

In 780 Charlemagne was a guest on the island while travelling in the area.

In 1100, bishop Gebhard (III) of Constance sought refuge on the island during the Investiture Controversy.

=== Dominican Monastery ===
According to various sources, the island was handed over to the Dominicans in 1220, and in 1234 was assigned as a location to build a monastery by an order of the prince bishop Heinrich von Tanne of Constance. The monastery was established in 1236.

The Chapter House, 25 m north of the monastery, was built long before the founding of the monastery. The first chapter house in the world was built in Worcester in 1110.

Around 1300, the mystic and poet Heinrich Suso was born in Constance. He became a friar at the Dominican convent on the island.

At the beginning of the Council of Constance, from 6 December 1414 to 24 March 1415, Jan Hus, considered the first Church reformer as he lived before Martin Luther, Calvin and Zwingli, was held in the dungeon of the monastery. This was in the basement of the round tower on the eastern side, overlooking the lake, next to the Dominicans' dining room. During the Council, the French delegation was housed in the chapter house.

In 1507 Maximilian I organized celebrations in the garden on the island during the Diet of Constance. From 1528 to 1549, the convent was used by the city of Constance as a temporary hospital. It was then returned to the friars. In 1633, during the Thirty Years' War, the Swedish fleet attacked the island.

In 1785 the friars were finally driven from the island by the Austrian Emperor Joseph II, because a thriving industry was closer to his heart than the mendicant friars. On 26 July 1785 the last Mass was celebrated in the church on the island, and the convent closed the following the day. Other monasteries in the area were also closed.
