= Konstanz-Wollmatingen station =

Railway station in Konstanz, Germany

Konstanz-Wollmatingen
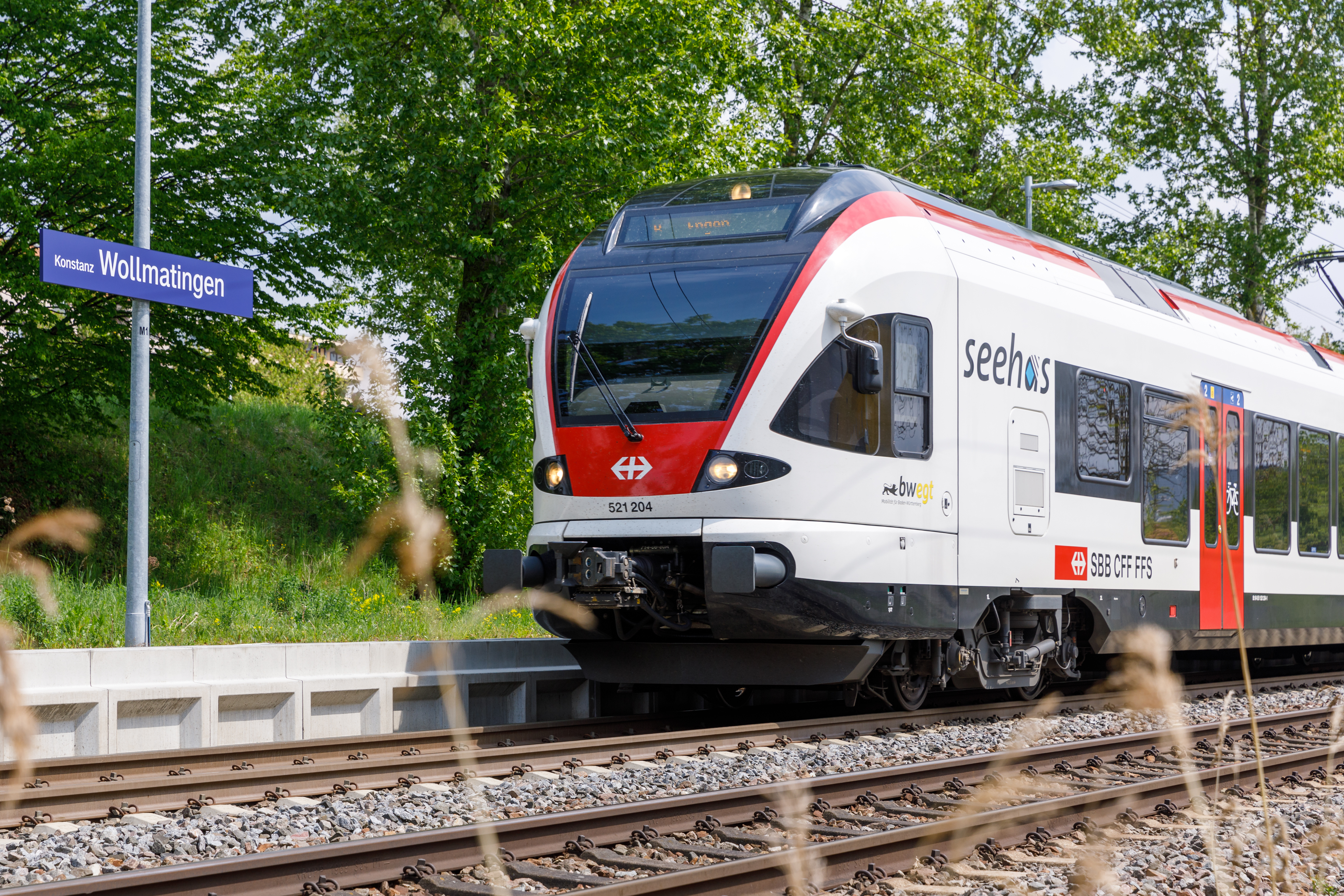
- Seehas at the station in 2021

General information
- Location: Konstanz, Baden-Württemberg; Germany
- Coordinates: 47°40′57″N 9°08′50″E
- Owner: DB Netz
- Lines: High Rhine Railway (KBS 720)
- Platforms: 2 side platforms
- Tracks: 2
- Train operators: SBB GmbH
- Connections: Stadtbus Konstanz

Other information
- Fare zone: 5 (Verkehrsverbund Hegau-Bodensee)

Services
Preceding station	SBB Deutschland	Following station
Reichenau (Baden) towards Engen	S6	Konstanz-Fürstenberg towards Konstanz
Location

Konstanz-Wollmatingen station (German: Bahnhof Konstanz-Wollmatingen) is a railway station in the city of Konstanz, Baden-Württemberg, Germany. It is located on the standard gauge High Rhine Railway of Deutsche Bahn and served by regional trains only.

== Services ==
The station is called at by the Seehas, a named train which is part of Bodensee S-Bahn. As of the December 2023 timetable change, the following services stop at Konstanz-Wollmatingen:

- SBB GmbH S6: half-hourly service between Engen and Konstanz, via Singen (Hohentwiel)
