= Konstanz-Fürstenberg station =

Railway station in Konstanz, Germany

Konstanz-Fürstenberg
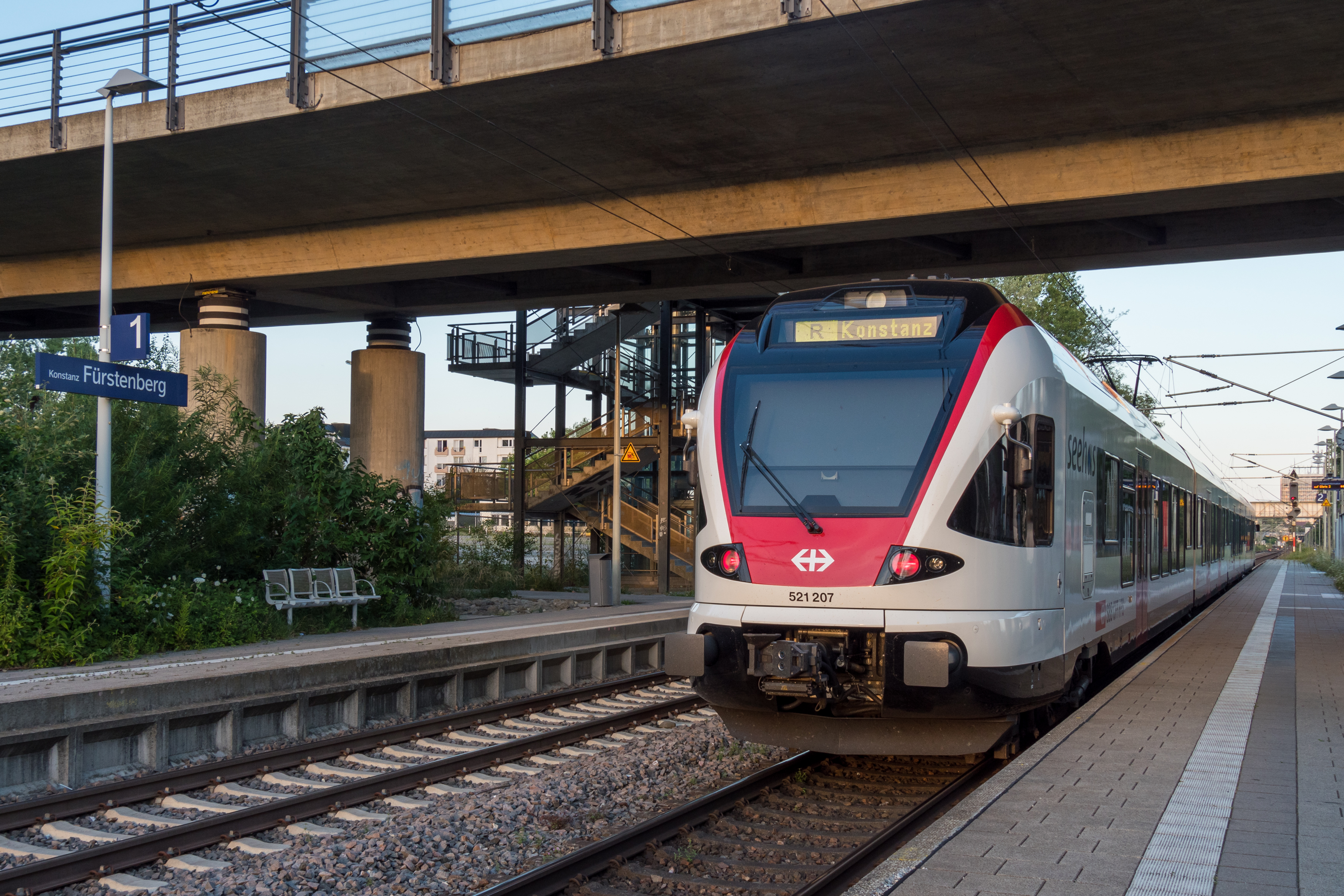
- Seehas at the station in 2019

General information
- Location: Konstanz, Baden-Württemberg; Germany
- Coordinates: 47°40′39″N 9°09′46″E
- Owner: DB Netz
- Lines: High Rhine Railway (KBS 720)
- Platforms: 2 side platforms
- Tracks: 2
- Train operators: SBB GmbH
- Connections: Stadtbus Konstanz

Other information
- Fare zone: 5 (Verkehrsverbund Hegau-Bodensee)

Services
Preceding station	SBB Deutschland	Following station
Konstanz-Wollmatingen towards Engen	S6	Konstanz-Petershausen towards Konstanz
Location

Konstanz-Fürstenberg station (German: Bahnhof Konstanz-Fürstenberg) is a railway station in the city of Konstanz, Baden-Württemberg, Germany. It is situated on the standard gauge High Rhine Railway of Deutsche Bahn. It is served exclusively by regional trains.

== Services ==
The station is called at by the Seehas, a named train which is part of Bodensee S-Bahn. As of the December 2023 timetable change, the following services stop at Konstanz-Fürstenberg:

- SBB GmbH S6: half-hourly service between Engen and Konstanz, via Singen (Hohentwiel)
