= Constance Hopper =

Coordinates: 47°39′30″N 9°11′30″E

Constance Hopper is on the border between Germany and Switzerland.

The Constance Hopper, Bay of Constance or Constance Funnel (German: Konstanzer Trichter) is a bay in Lake Constance, to the east of Constance and north of Kreuzlingen. The leading outflow of the Upper Lake is the Seerhein, which begins in the Constance hopper.

The Constance Hopper the only part of the Obersee, where a territorial boundary has been defined by the neighbouring states, in this case, Germany and Switzerland.

The Dominicans Island is located in the Constance Hopper. It is part of the city of Constance.
