= Anne Winterer =

German photographer (1894–1938)

- Born: 21 September 1894; Konstanz
- Died: 17 August 1938 (aged 43); Berlin
- Occupation: Photographer

Anne Winterer (21 September 1894 – 17 August 1938) was a German photographer known for her industrial and cultural work. Her rediscovered work is in the German New Objectivity style and records particularly people's work at the time.

== Life ==
Winterer was born in Konstanz in 1894 where she decided to become a photographer. She trained and qualified in 1915. That year she spent three months working in Furtwangen before she moved to Düsseldorf. She worked at two studios where she took both portraits and industrial subjects.

In 1924 she met Erna Wagner. She first trained and then went into partnership with Erna Wagner-Hehmke opening a joint studio in Düsseldorf in 1925. Together they won prizes for their work. In 1926 they took a gold medal at the Düsseldorf Exhibition in a scientific category. During the 30s her work was featured in the magazine "Atlantis" and she recorded industrial subjects as well as local cultural events in the New Objectionist style. In 1935 her partnership ended and she returned to her home town. From there she started to travel to Austria, Portugal and Switzerland which she recorded with her camera. Meanwhile, her former partner continued their previous business. She had now married, but the business retained the name of "Hehmke-Wintering".

Winterer died of cancer in Berlin in 1938. Her photographic legacy has been rediscovered by historian Matthias Dudde. Her rediscovered work records particularly people's work at the time.
