= Georg Winterer =

German entrepreneur and neuroscientist (born 1961)

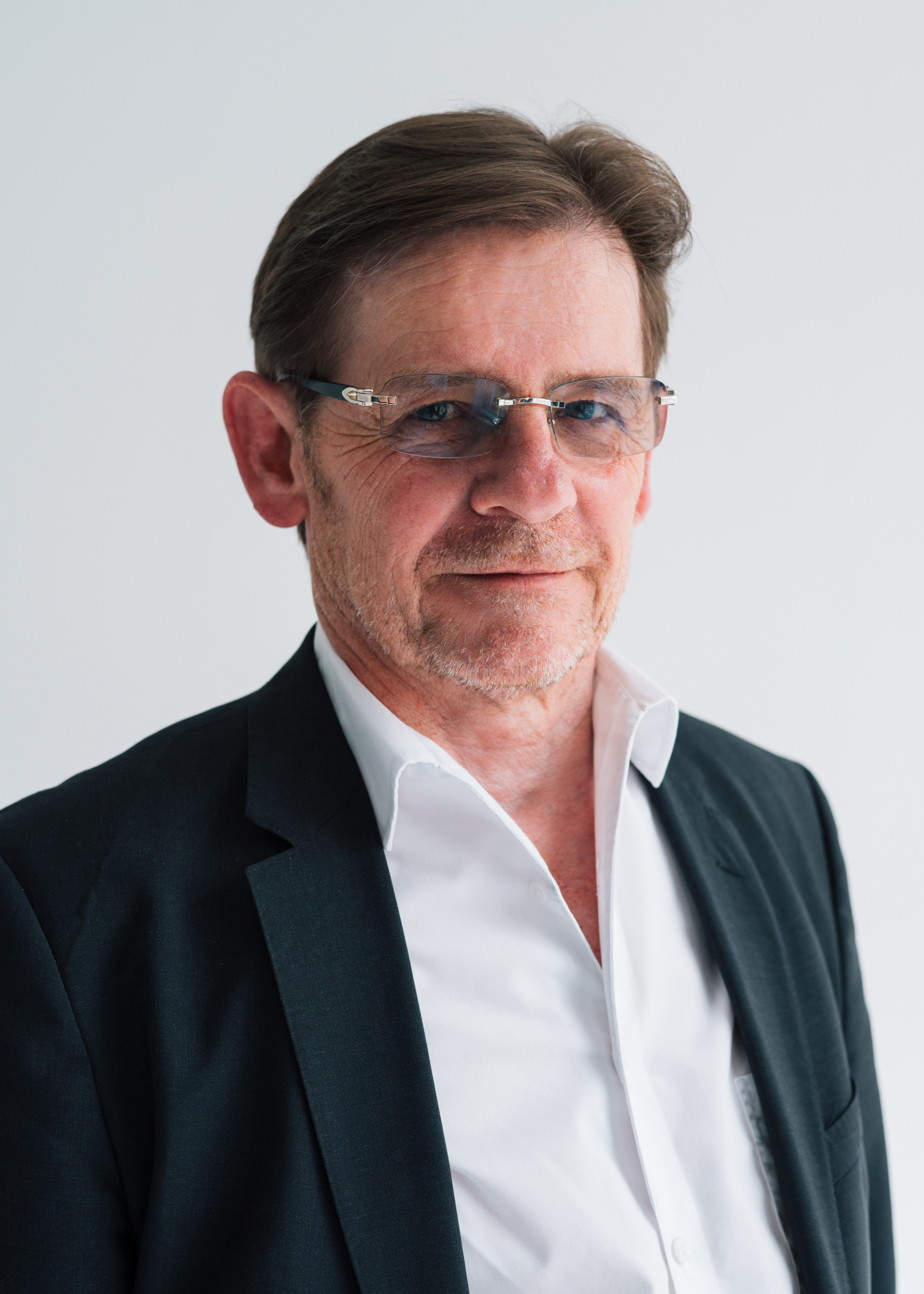
Prof. Dr. Georg Winterer

Georg Winterer (born July 9, 1961) is a German entrepreneur, neuroscientist and specialist in psychiatry and psychotherapy. He is an Associate Professor at the Charité – University Medicine Berlin, director of the Neuroimaging Research Group in the Experimental and Clinical Research Center (ECRC) at the Charité – University Medicine Berlin. He is the founder and managing director of the Berlin PI Solutions Group GmbH.

== Career ==
Winterer studied human medicine, philosophy and German studies at the Free University of Berlin. He received his doctorate in 1991 with an experimental epidemiological work at the Institute for Medical Psychology. In 1997 he completed his Residency in neurology / intensive care medicine, neurophysiology and psychiatry and in the emergency service at the Brandenburg State Hospital and the Free University of Berlin.

From 1995 to 1997 Winterer worked as a scientific assistant in the laboratory for psychophysiology at the Free University of Berlin as well as accompanying specialist outpatient and consultant medical work. In 2001 Georg Winterer completed his habilitation with a thesis on the "Physiology of Prefrontal Function". As a Clinical Research Fellow and Fogarty Fellow of the Global Health Fellowship Program, he conducted research from 1997 to 2003 at the National Institutes of Health (NIMH / NIAAA) in Bethesda, USA.

Winterer directed the clinical research unit / research outpatient ambulance and sub-project leader of the National Schizophrenia Sibling Study at the NIMH (Clinical Brain Disorder Branch, CBDB). At the same time, he passed the three US state examinations (human medicine) and received the United States Permanent Resident Card (“Green Card”) in the Outstanding Scientist category. After his stay in the USA, Winterer returned to Germany for family reasons and worked as a senior physician in psychiatry at the University of Mainz.

In 2006, Vice-Rector Jürgen Schrader appointed Georg Winterer a lifetime W2 professor for psychiatry at the Clinic for Psychiatry and Psychotherapy of the Heinrich Heine University in Düsseldorf. There, Winterer was a senior physician in charge of the clinic and head of the consultative psychiatry department.

From 2009 to 2012 he was a research group leader at the Cologne Center for Genomics (CCG) at the University of Cologne, and from 2006 to 2012 an Associate Scientist at the Research Center Jülich of the Helmholtz Association (Institute for Neurosciences). Since 2012, Georg Winterer has been a research group leader at the Experimental & Clinical Research Center of the Charité - Universitätsmedizin Berlin.

== Research areas ==
Georg Winterer's main focus is the risk prediction of the course of disease. His early publications are dedicated to addiction research and schizophrenia (electrophysiology, neuroimaging, pharmacology, genetics). His more recent scientific publications focus shifted to cognitive decline (neurodegeneration) in the critically ill elderly patients.

In the course of his earlier scientific work, Winterer discovered that in addiction disorders (alcohol and tobacco) a disturbed function of the frontal lobe (overactivation of the frontal lobe) predicts an unfavorable course of the disease (especially relapse). In more than ten years of research (1994–2007), Winterer discovered that a disorder of the frontal brain function (reduced signal-to-noise ratio with increased noise during information processing) is associated with a (genetically) increased risk of schizophrenia. The corresponding studies are the basis of one of the most frequently cited simulation models (Computational Neural Network Model) of the impaired brain function in schizophrenia. Winterer is also the first to describe a risk signature (clinical, imaging, molecular) that increases the risk in older surgical patients after an operation to suffer cognitive impairments, which in turn is associated with a significantly increased mortality and considerable socio-economic costs.

== Entrepreneurial activity ==
Since the early 1990s, Winterer worked as a study physician and consultant (CNS phase 1 / phase 2 studies) at the clinical research organization Parexel, initially in Berlin and later in Washington, D.C. After returning to Germany, he founded Pharmaimage Biomarker Solutions GmbH. In the first few years, the company's business model consisted primarily of supporting the research-based pharmaceutical industry in Germany and the European Union in carrying out drug studies (approval studies phase 1/2: first-in-man and first-in-patient studies). In 2016, the subsidiary Pharmaimage Biomarker Solutions Inc. was founded in Cambridge (Kendall Square) near Boston (USA). In 2019, Winterer founded PI Health Solutions GmbH and PI Insure Solutions GmbH under the umbrella of the PI Solutions Group GmbH holding. PI Health Solutions GmbH is a developer of AI-supported diagnostic software for the risk prediction of the course of diseases (e.g. BioCog software). At the same time, the company provides logistical service for the implementation of studies in the health sector (excluding pharmaceuticals), e.g. in the context of a study financed by the German Federal Ministry of Health since June 2020 "SARS-CoV-2: A dynamic nationwide representative study (Corona-BUND study)".

== Publications ==
- with Zacharias N, Musso F, Müller F, Lammers F, Saleh A, London M, de Boer P (2020): Ketamine effects on default mode network activity and vigilance: A randomized, placebo-controlled crossover simultaneous fMRI/EEG study. 9Hum Brain Mapp. 2020 Jan;41(1):107-119. doi: 10.1002/hbm.24791.
- with Lammers F, Mobascher A, Musso F, Shah NJ, Warbrick T, Zaborszky L (2015): Effect of the Nucleus basalis of Meynert on attention shows hemispheric asymmetry. Brain & Behav (in press). doi: 10.1002/brb3.421.
- with Reinthaler EM (2014): 16p11.2 European Consortium, Lerche H, Nürnberg P, Mefford H, Scheffer IE, Berkovic SF, Beckmann JS; EPICURE Consortium; EuroEPINOMICS Consortium, Sander T, Jacquemont S, Reymond A, Zimprich F, Neubauer BA (2014). 16p11.2 600 kb Duplications confer risk for typical and atypical Rolandic epilepsy. Hum Mol Genet 23:6069-80
- with Quednow, BB, Brinkmeyer J, Mobascher A, Nothnagel M, Musso F, Gründer G, Savary N, Petrovsky N, Frommann I, Lennertz L, Spreckelmeyer KN, Wienker TF, Dahmen N, Thuerauf N, Clepce M, Kiefer F, Majic T, Mössner R, Maier W, Gallinat J, Diaz-Lacava A, Toliat MR, Thiele H, Nürnberg P, Wagner M (2012): Schizophrenia risk polymorphisms in the TCF4 gene interact with smoking in the modulation of auditory sensory gating. PNAS 109:6271-6
- with Musso F, Brinkmeyer J, Ecker D, London MK, Thieme G, Warbrick T, Wittsack HJ, Saleh A, Greb W, de Boer P (2011): Ketamine effects on brain function--simultaneous fMRI/EEG during a visual oddball task. Neuroimage. 2011 Sep 15;58(2):508-25. doi: 10.1016/j.neuroimage.2011.06.045.
- with Tretter F, Gebicke-Haerter P, Mendoza E (2010): Systems Biology in Psychiatric Research. doi: 10.1002/9783527630271
- with Rolls ET, Loh M, Deco G (2008): Schizophrenia and computational models of dopamine modulation in the prefrontal cortex. Nature Reviews Neuroscience 9:696-709
- with Musso F, Konrad A, .... Sander T, Gallinat, J. (2007): Association of attentional network function and exon 5 variations of the CHRNA4 gene. Human Mol Genet 16:2165-2174
- with Klöppel B, Heinz A, Ziller M, Dufeu P, Schmidt LG, Herrmann WM (1998a): Quantitative EEG (QEEG) Predicts Relapse in Patients With Chronic Alcoholism and Points to a Frontally Pronounced Cerebral Disturbance. Psychiatry Res . 1998a Mar 20;78(1-2):101-13. doi: 10.1016/s0165-1781(97)00148-0.
- with Ziller M, Klöppel B, Heinz A, Schmidt L G, Herrmann W M (1998b): Analysis of Quantitative EEG With Artificial Neural Networks and Discriminant Analysis--A Methodological Comparison. Neuropsychobiology. 1998b;37(1):41-8. doi: 10.1159/00002647
