= Konstanz =

City in Baden-Württemberg, Germany

Constance Konstanz
- Town
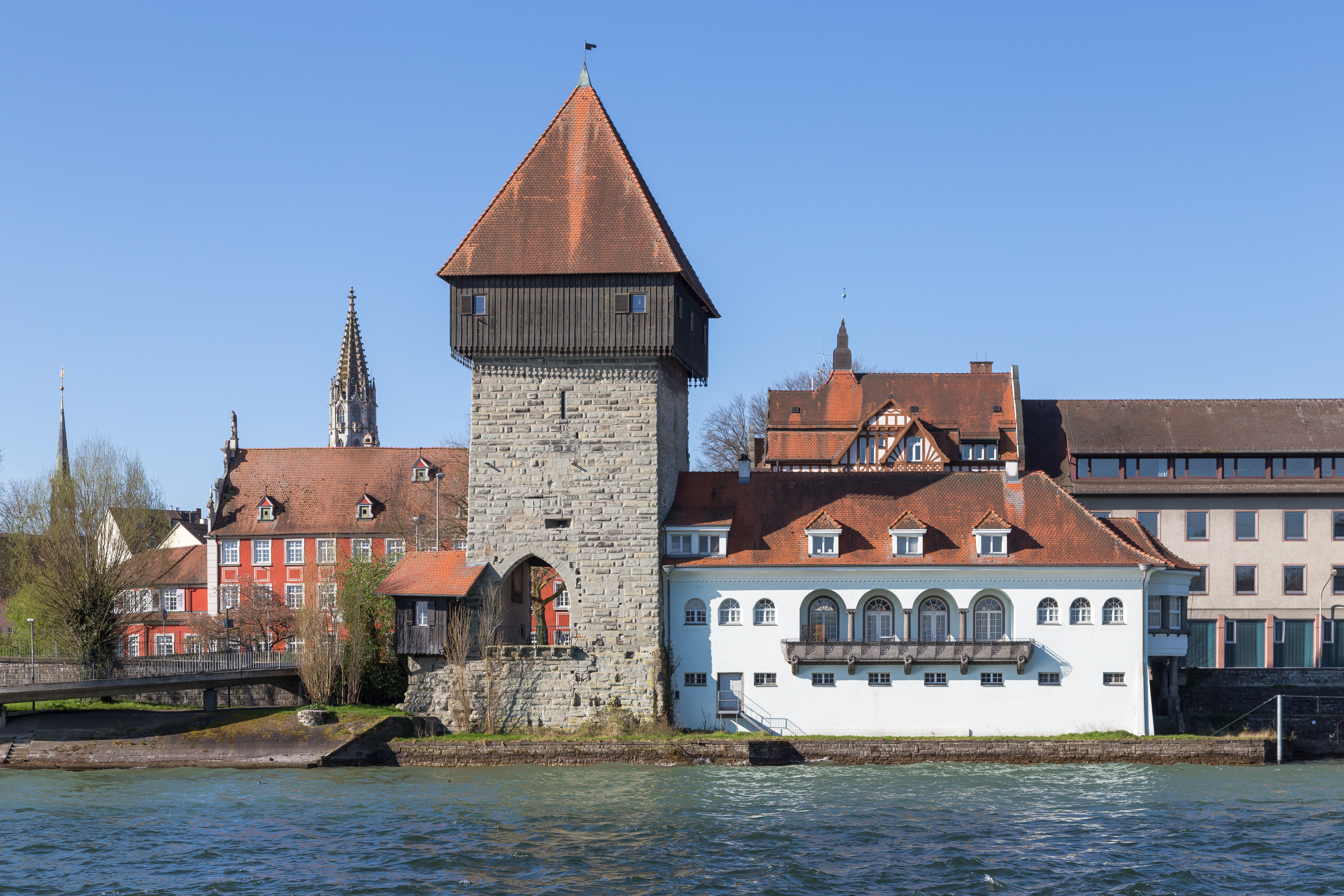
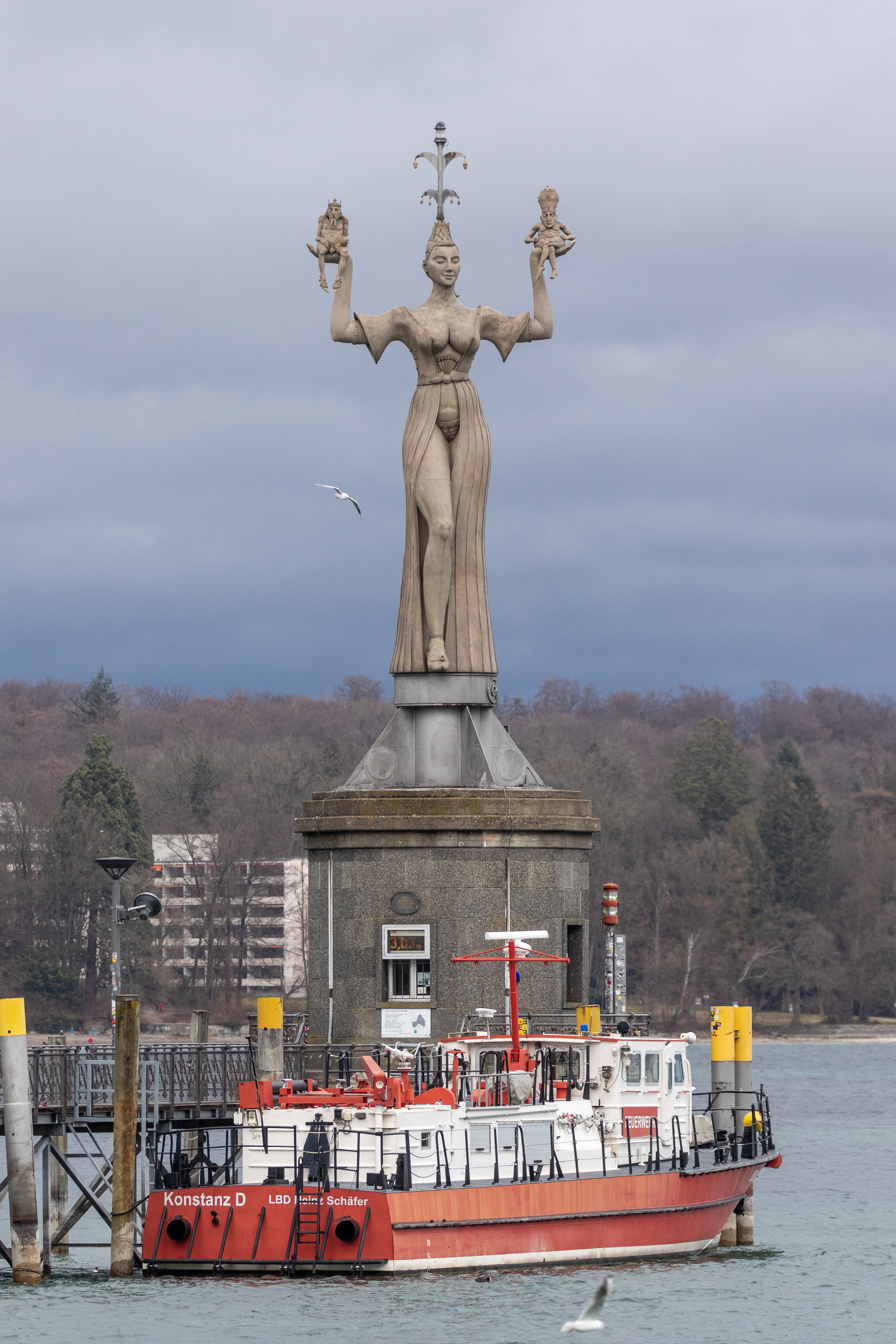
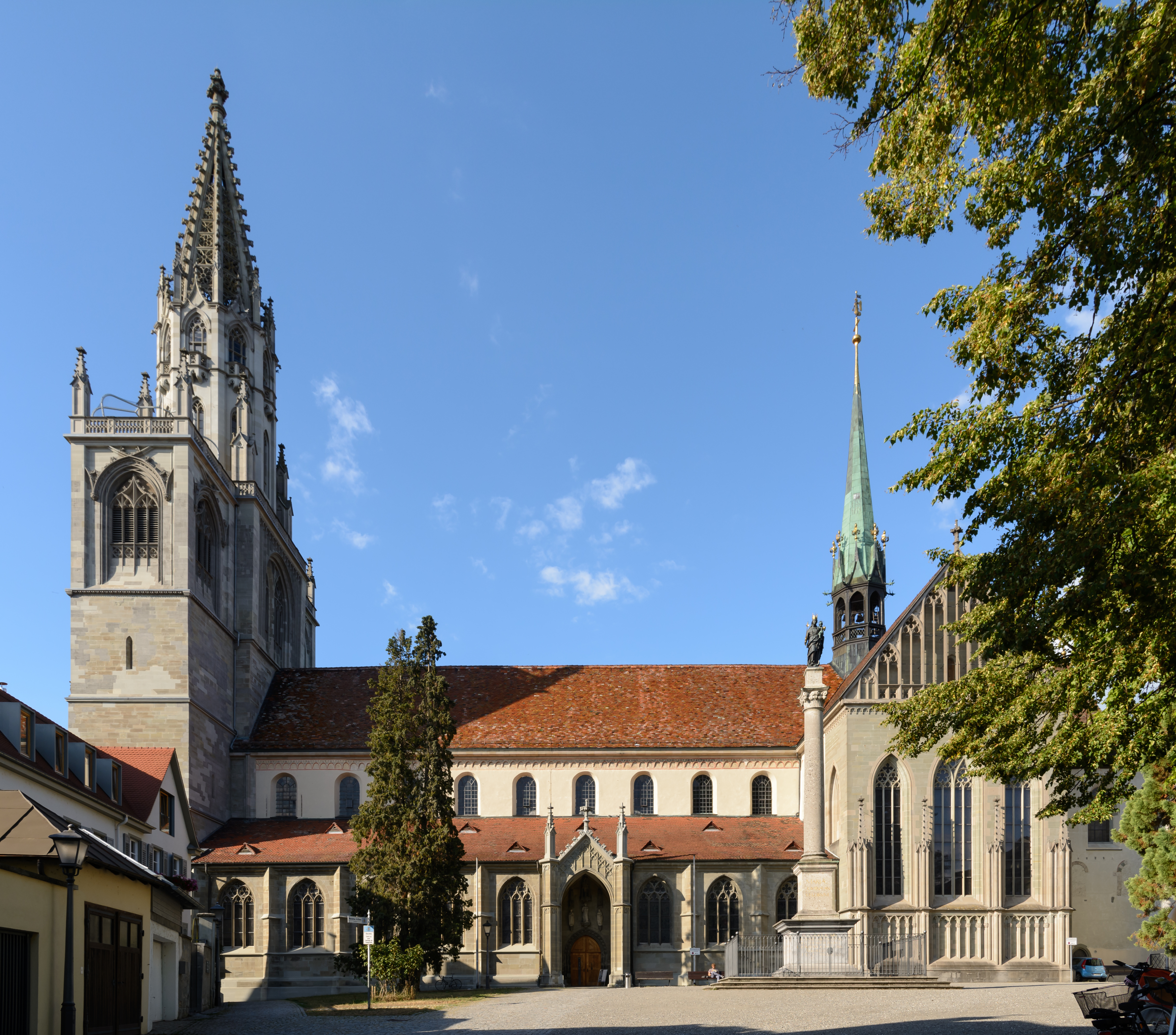
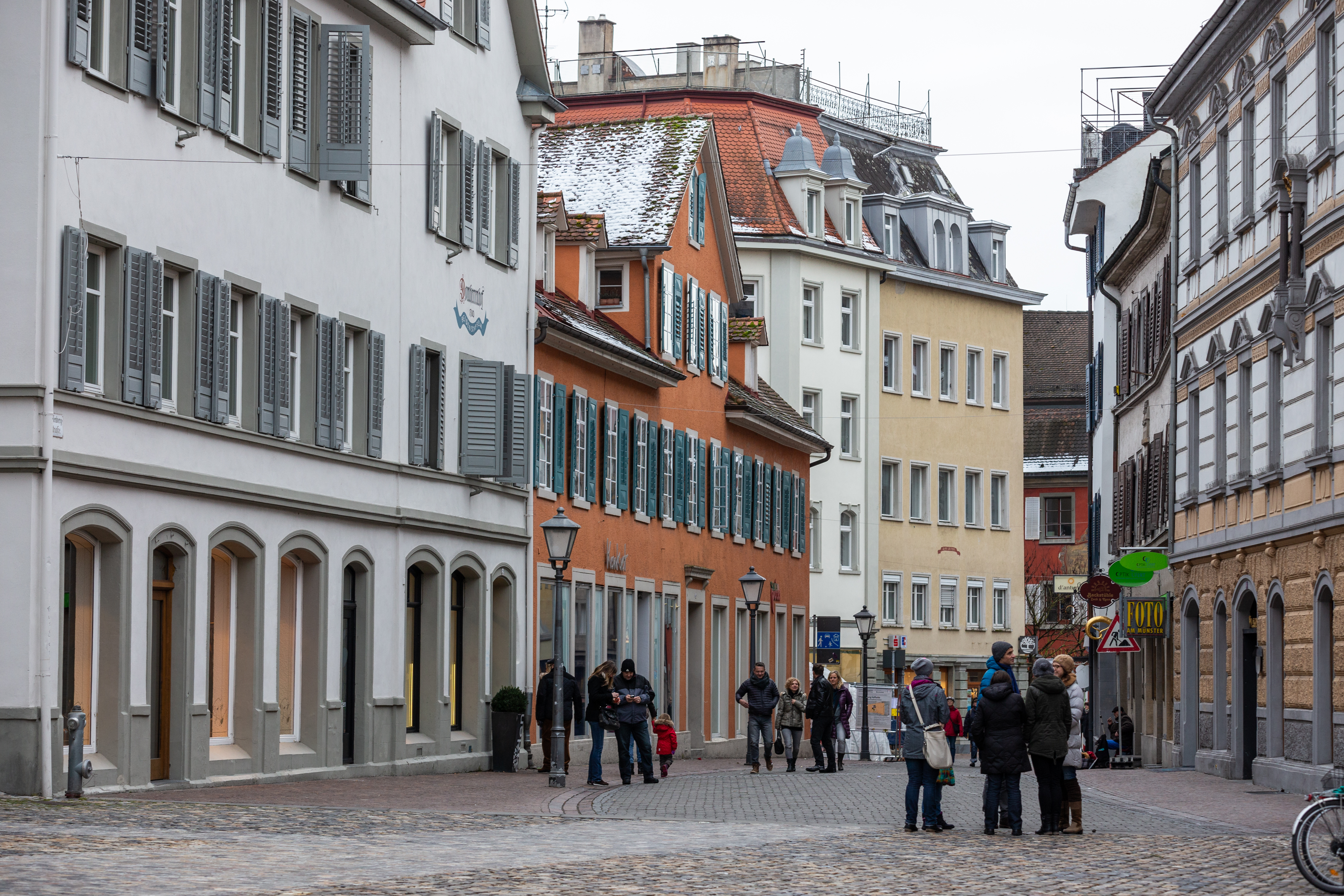
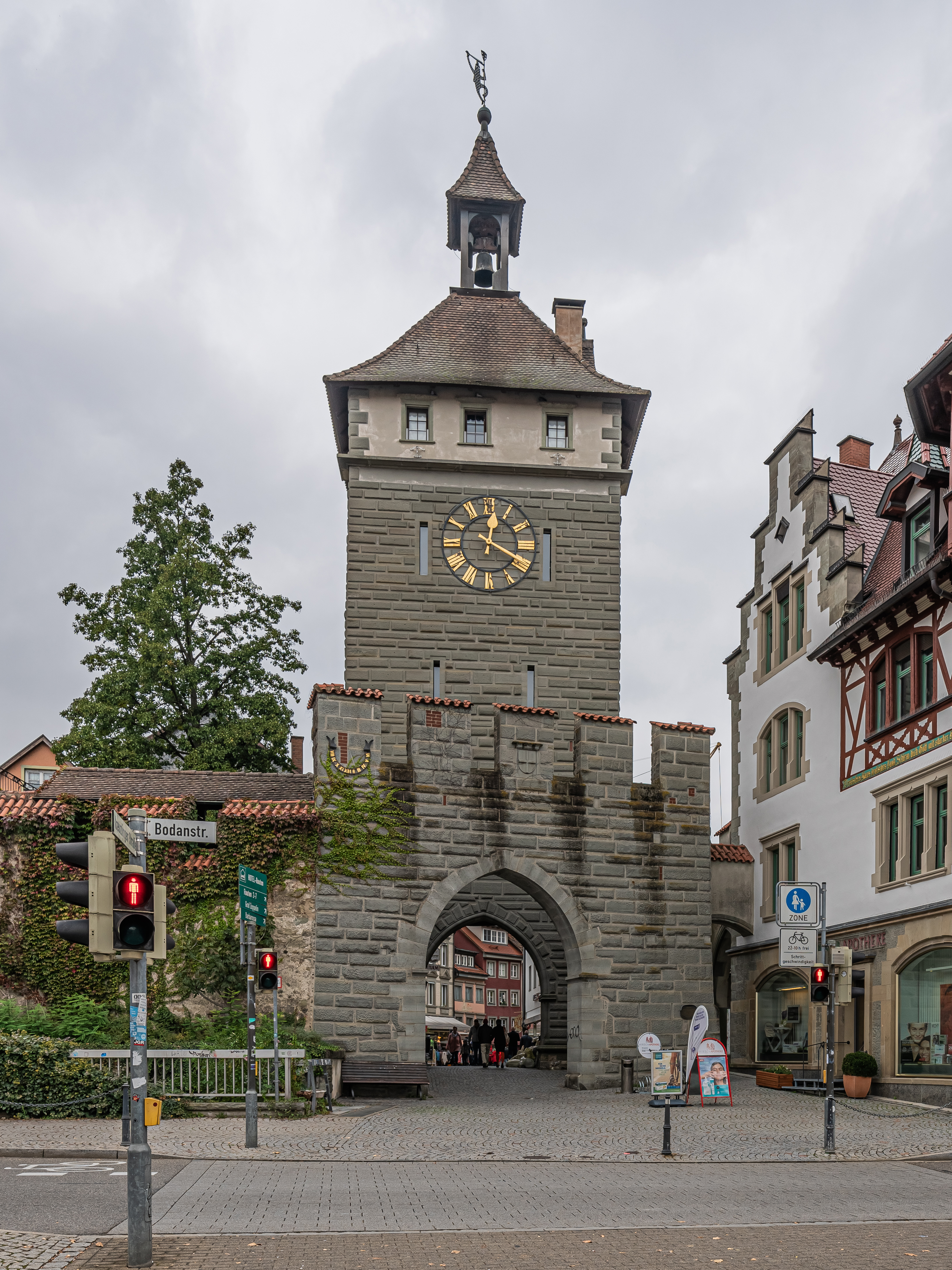
- Clockwise from top: Rheintorturm, a section of the former city wall of Konstanz at Lake Constance; Konstanz Minster; Schnetztor, a section of the former city wall; Old town street; Imperia statue at Lake Constance harbour, the city's landmark

- Flag Coat of arms

- Location of Constance within Konstanz district
- Interactive map of Constance
- Location within Germany Location within Baden-Württemberg
- Coordinates: 47°40′N 9°11′E
- Country: Germany
- State: Baden-Württemberg
- Admin. region: Freiburg
- District: Konstanz
- Subdivisions: 15

Government
  - Mayor (2020–28): Ulrich Burchardt (CDU)

Area
  - Total: 54.11 km^{2} (20.89 sq mi)
- Elevation: 405 m (1,329 ft)

Population (2025-12-31)
  - Total: 86,691
  - Density: 1,602/km^{2} (4,149/sq mi)
- Time zone: UTC+01:00 (CET)
  - Summer (DST): UTC+02:00 (CEST)
- Postal codes: 78462–78467
- Dialling codes: 07531, 07533
- Vehicle registration: KN
- Website: www.konstanz.de

Konstanz (/ˈkɒnstənts/ KON-stənts, US also /ˈkɔːnstɑːnts/ KAWN-stahnts, German: [ˈkɔnʃtants] or [ˈkɔnstants], Alemannic German: [ˈkoʃd̥əts, ˈxoʃd̥əts]), traditionally known as Constance in English, is a university city with approximately 83,000 inhabitants located at the western end of Upper Lake Constance in the Baden-Württemberg state of south Germany. The city houses the University of Konstanz and was the residence of the Roman Catholic Diocese of Konstanz for more than 1,200 years.

== Location ==
The city is located in the state of Baden-Württemberg and situated at the banks of Lake Constance (Bodensee), on the Constance Hopper. The river Rhine, which rises in the Swiss Alps, passes through Upper Lake Constance (Obersee) and leaves it, considerably larger, by flowing under the Old Rhine Bridge connecting the two parts of the city (this part of the river is also called the Seerhein). North of the river, on the Bodanrück peninsula, lies the larger part of the city with residential areas, industrial estates, and the University of Konstanz; while south of the river is the old town (Altstadt, including the Dominicans Island), which houses the administrative centre and shopping facilities in addition to the Hochschule (University of Applied Sciences) as well as the port and main railway station.

The Germany–Switzerland border runs along the southwestern and southern edge of the city, demarcating it from the Swiss town of Kreuzlingen. To the west, Konstanz borders the municipalities of Allensbach and Reichenau and the Hegau region.

== Subdivisions ==
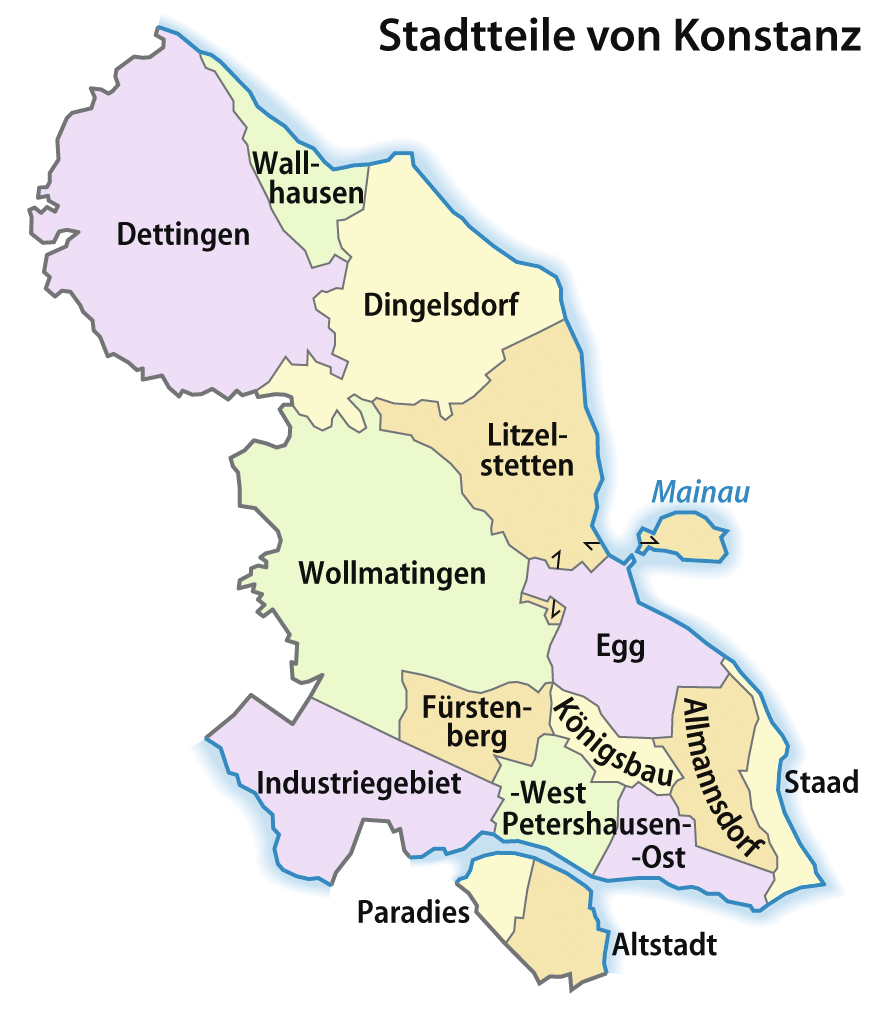
Wards of Konstanz

Konstanz is subdivided into 15 wards or districts (Stadtteile):

- Altstadt
- Allmannsdorf
- Egg
- Dettingen
- Dingelsdorf
- Fürstenberg
- Industriegebiet
- Königsbau
- Litzelstetten
- Paradies
- Staad
- Wallhausen
- West- and Ost-Petershausen
- Wollmatingen

The island of Mainau belonged to the ward of Litzelstetten, a separate municipality, until its incorporation into Konstanz on 1 December 1971. Altstadt and Paradies are the only territories of Germany located south of the Rhine.

== History ==
The first traces of civilization in Konstanz date back to the late Stone Age. During the reign of Augustus, the Celts living south of the Danube were conquered by the Romans. Around 40 AD, the first Romans settled on the site. This small town on the left bank of the Rhine was probably first called Drusomagus and belonged to the Roman province of Raetia. Its later name, originally Constantia, comes either from the Roman emperor Constantius Chlorus, who fought the Alemanni in the region and built a strong fortress around 300 AD, or from his grandson Constantius II, who visited the region in 354. The remains of the late Roman fortress Constantia were discovered in 2003.

Around 585 the first bishop took up residence in Konstanz and this marked the beginning of the city's importance as a spiritual center. By the late Middle Ages, about one quarter of Konstanz's 6,000 inhabitants were exempt from taxation on account of clerical rights.

Trade thrived during the Middle Ages. Konstanz owned the only bridge in the region, which crossed the Rhine, making it a strategic location in the Duchy of Swabia. Its linen production had made an international name for the city and it was prosperous. In 1192, Konstanz gained the status of Imperial City so it was henceforth subject only to the Holy Roman Emperor.

In 1414 to 1418, the Council of Constance took place, during which, on 6 July 1415, Jan Hus (Czech religious thinker, philosopher and reformer), who was seen as a threat to Christianity by the Roman Catholic Church, was burned at the stake. It was here that the Papal Schism was ended and Pope Martin V was elected during the only conclave ever held north of the Alps. Ulrich von Richental's illustrated chronicle of the Council of Constance testifies to all the major happenings during the council as well as showing the everyday life of medieval Konstanz. The Konzilgebäude where the conclave was held can still be seen standing by the harbour. Close by stands the Imperia, a statue that was erected in 1993 to satirically commemorate the council.

In 1460, the Swiss Confederacy conquered Thurgau, Konstanz's natural hinterland. Konstanz then made an attempt to get admitted to the Swiss Confederacy, but the forest cantons voted against its entry, fearing overbearing city states; Konstanz then joined the Swabian League instead. In the Swabian War of 1499, Konstanz lost its last privileges over Thurgau to the Confederation.

The Protestant Reformation took hold in Konstanz in the 1520s, headed by Ambrosius Blarer. Soon the city declared itself officially Protestant, pictures were removed from the churches, and the bishop temporarily moved to Meersburg, a small town across the lake. The city first followed the Tetrapolitan Confession, and then the Augsburg Confession. However, in 1548 Emperor Charles V imposed the Imperial Ban on Konstanz and it had to surrender to Habsburg Austria which had suddenly attacked. Thus Konstanz lost its status as an imperial city. The new Habsburg rulers were eager to re-Catholicise the town and in 1604 a Jesuit College was opened. Its accompanying theatre, built in 1610, is the oldest theatre in Germany still performing regularly.

The city became part of the Grand Duchy of Baden in 1806. In 1821, the Bishopric of Constance was dissolved and became part of the Archdiocese of Freiburg. Konstanz became part of the German Empire in 1871 during the unification of Germany. After World War I it was included within the Republic of Baden.

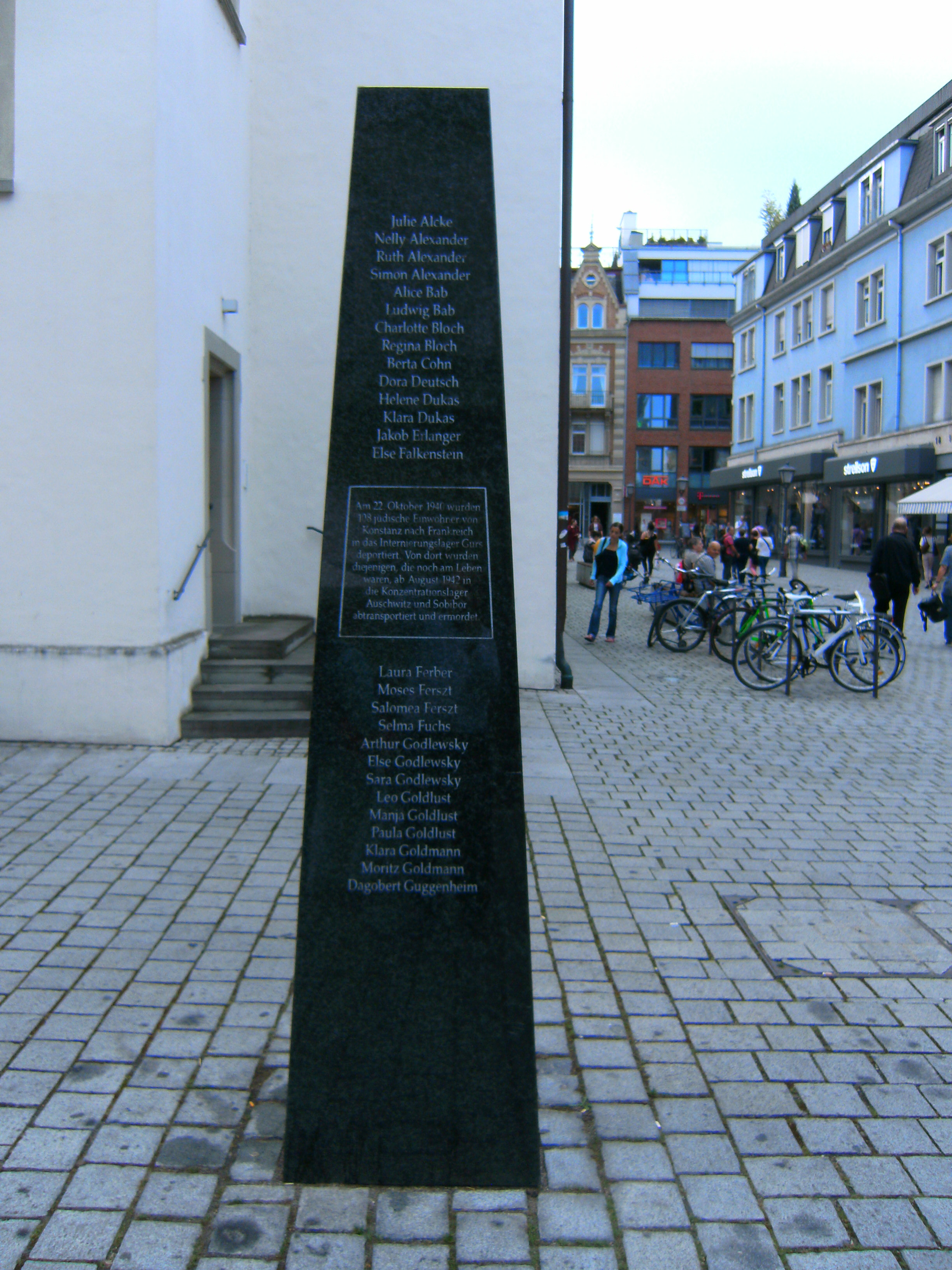
Memorial to the murdered Jews of Konstanz

On 22 October 1940, 110 of the last Jewish residents were deported to Gurs internment camp in France. Most of those who were still alive in August 1942 were murdered in either Sobibór or Auschwitz.

Because it almost lies within Switzerland, directly adjacent to the Swiss border, Konstanz was not bombed by the Allied Forces during World War II. After the war, Konstanz was included first in South Baden and then in the new state of Baden-Württemberg.

The Altstadt (Old Town), which is large considering the small size of modern Konstanz, has many old buildings and twisting alleys. The city skyline is dominated by Konstanz Cathedral, several other churches and three towers left over from the city wall, one of which marks the place of the former medieval bridge over the Rhine.

The University of Konstanz was established close to the town in 1966. It houses a library with approximately two million books, all freely accessible 24 hours a day, as well as a botanical garden (the Botanischer Garten der Universität Konstanz). Especially since 2007, the university, being one of the nine German universities most successful in the German Universities Excellence Initiative, has gained considerable reputation as a so-called "elite university".

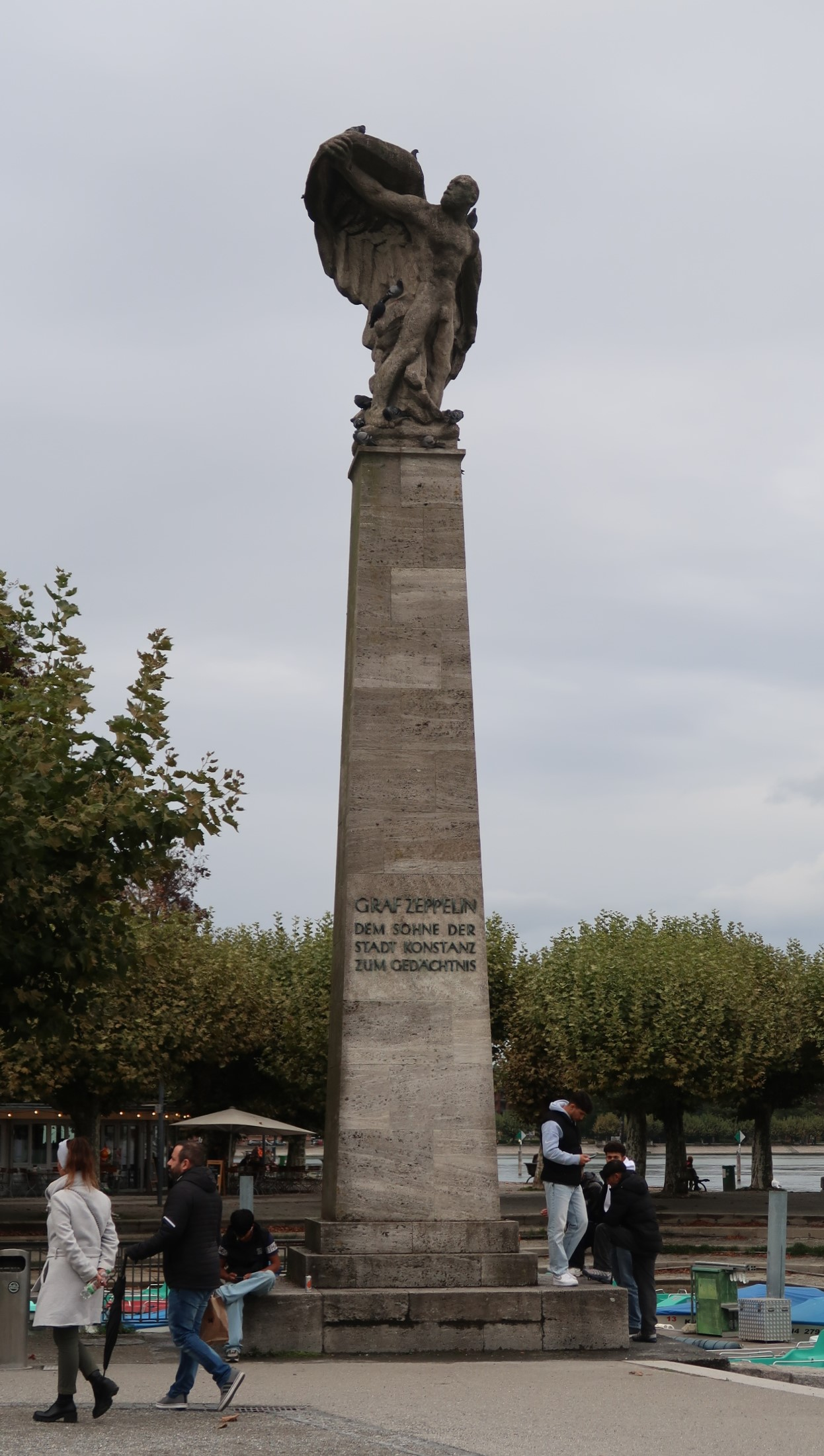
Monument to Count Zeppelin

Konstanz was the birthplace of Count Ferdinand von Zeppelin, constructor of the famous Zeppelin airships. There is a monument at Brunnenanlage, near the Imperia statue, with the inscription: Graf Zeppelin dem Sohne der Stadt Konstanz zum Gedächtnis (lit. 'In memory of Count Zeppelin, son of the city of Constance').

In the late 2010s, Konstanz has become a popular destination for Einkaufstourismus, or cross-border shopping by Swiss due to lower prices on basic items in Germany, a favorable exchange rate between the Swiss franc and the euro, and a generous German VAT refund for non-European Union residents. Retail chains such as H&M and dm have built large new stores near the town's central square to cater to this trade, and some Konstanz residents feel the city is losing its historic character in the process; many of them avoid the area on Saturdays. This has led to friction with officials from Kreuzlingen as their city has seen no economic benefit from this trade, and they have been requesting that their national government bring up the issue of the VAT refund with Germany. Subsequently, Germany has introduced a minimum spend amount of €50.01 per receipt for the German VAT to be refunded. Customs clearance centres are conveniently located near shopping centres.

== Main sights ==
- Archaeological Museum
- Imperia, a 9 m-tall sculpture
- Jan Hus Museum
- Rosgartenmuseum
- Konstanz Cathedral
- Konzil edifice, dating to the 15th century
- Niederburg (Lower Castle)
- Petershausen Abbey
- Remains of a Roman fortress, near the Cathedral
- Schnetztor, fortified gate of the former city walls
- Sea Life aquarium

Konstanz was also home to a large synagogue, destroyed by the Nazi government in 1938.

== World Heritage Site ==
It is home to one or more prehistoric pile-dwelling (or stilt house) settlements that are part of the Prehistoric Pile dwellings around the Alps UNESCO World Heritage Site.

== Transport ==
The city is situated on the Lake Constance Belt Railway. Konstanz station is the eastern terminus of the High Rhine Railway line, running westwards to Singen, with connections to all parts of Germany and the Swiss cities of Schaffhausen and Basel. There are three other stations in Konstanz along this line: Konstanz-Fürstenberg, Konstanz-Petershausen and Konstanz-Wollmatingen. In addition, Konstanz station is linked via two connectors (in both directions) to the Lake Line, which runs along the Swiss shore of Lake Constance and the High Rhine. It is indirectly also linked to the Wil–Kreuzlingen railway line to Weinfelden, with connections to long-distance trains in Switzerland. Regional trains (S-Bahn) operate for Bodensee S-Bahn and St. Gallen S-Bahn. Services are provided by the Deutsche Bahn and also the Swiss Federal Railways and its subsidiaries Thurbo and SBB GmbH.

Bus services within the city are provided by Stadtwerke Konstanz GmbH.

Additionally, a car ferry provides access across Lake Überlingen to Meersburg. Since 2005, Konstanz and Friedrichshafen have been connected by the two catamarans Constance and Fridolin, and since 2008 by a third one, Ferdinand. Konstanz is also served by URh boat lines to Kreuzlingen and Schaffhausen.

The nearest airport is Friedrichshafen Airport, which can be reached by a fast ferry service. This airport mainly hosts domestic flights, but flights to Austria and Turkey are also available. The nearest international airports are in Stuttgart, Basel, and Zurich, of which the latter has a direct train from Konstanz station.

== Media ==
Regional television is provided by SWR which broadcast from Stuttgart. However, the network also has a regional studio in the city. Due to close proximity to the Swiss border, the city can also receive Swiss TV Channels such as SRF 1, SRF zwei and SRF info.

Radio stations that broadcast to the city are SWR1 Baden-Württemberg, Radio 7 and Radio Seefunk, a community based station.

Local newspaper is served by the Südkurier.

== Climate ==
Its location in south-west Germany gives Konstanz a degraded oceanic climate (Köppen: Cfb) with warm and humid summers (moderated by the lake) as well as cold and snowy winters.

Climate data for Konstanz (1991–2020 normals, extremes 1961–2021)
Month	Jan	Feb	Mar	Apr	May	Jun	Jul	Aug	Sep	Oct	Nov	Dec	Year
Record high °C (°F)	16.3 (61.3)	19.4 (66.9)	24.4 (75.9)	30.7 (87.3)	33.1 (91.6)	36.3 (97.3)	36.9 (98.4)	36.5 (97.7)	30.9 (87.6)	27.5 (81.5)	22.0 (71.6)	17.0 (62.6)	36.9 (98.4)
Mean daily maximum °C (°F)	3.9 (39.0)	5.8 (42.4)	11.1 (52.0)	16.0 (60.8)	20.3 (68.5)	23.9 (75.0)	25.7 (78.3)	25.3 (77.5)	20.3 (68.5)	14.6 (58.3)	8.2 (46.8)	4.5 (40.1)	15 (59)
Daily mean °C (°F)	1.2 (34.2)	2.1 (35.8)	6.0 (42.8)	10.2 (50.4)	14.5 (58.1)	18.1 (64.6)	19.9 (67.8)	19.5 (67.1)	15.0 (59.0)	10.3 (50.5)	5.2 (41.4)	2.0 (35.6)	10.3 (50.5)
Mean daily minimum °C (°F)	−1.0 (30.2)	−0.9 (30.4)	2.0 (35.6)	5.2 (41.4)	9.5 (49.1)	13.2 (55.8)	15.0 (59.0)	14.8 (58.6)	11.1 (52.0)	7.3 (45.1)	2.9 (37.2)	−0.1 (31.8)	6.6 (43.9)
Record low °C (°F)	−21.8 (−7.2)	−21.5 (−6.7)	−17.5 (0.5)	−6.2 (20.8)	−4.4 (24.1)	0.2 (32.4)	3.7 (38.7)	4.0 (39.2)	−0.5 (31.1)	−4.0 (24.8)	−9.5 (14.9)	−14.0 (6.8)	−21.8 (−7.2)
Average precipitation mm (inches)	45.8 (1.80)	44.8 (1.76)	50.6 (1.99)	56.5 (2.22)	89.2 (3.51)	99.7 (3.93)	96.3 (3.79)	97.7 (3.85)	69.4 (2.73)	62.8 (2.47)	57.5 (2.26)	63.2 (2.49)	833.7 (32.82)
Average precipitation days (≥ 1.0 mm)	14.1	12.8	14.1	13.1	15.0	15.5	15.2	14.8	13.3	14.0	14.2	15.8	171.9
Average snowy days (≥ 1.0 cm)	7.0	7.2	2.1	0.2	0	0	0	0	0	0.1	1.7	5.3	23.6
Average relative humidity (%)	85.9	80.8	73.8	68.8	70.3	70.2	70.1	73.5	79.7	85.5	87.6	87.6	77.8
Mean monthly sunshine hours	49.1	75.4	129.8	205.2	239.7	239.6	234.2	214.4	161.5	116.0	52.0	37.7	1,824.1
Source 1: NCEI, (extremes for the 1961-1990 period)
Source 2: Data derived from Deutscher Wetterdienst

Climate data for Konstanz, 2015-2020 normals
Month	Jan	Feb	Mar	Apr	May	Jun	Jul	Aug	Sep	Oct	Nov	Dec	Year
Mean daily maximum °C (°F)	4.3 (39.7)	5.8 (42.4)	11.8 (53.2)	16.7 (62.1)	20.1 (68.2)	25.5 (77.9)	27.5 (81.5)	26.7 (80.1)	21.3 (70.3)	15.4 (59.7)	9.1 (48.4)	5.4 (41.7)	15.8 (60.4)
Mean daily minimum °C (°F)	−0.1 (31.8)	0.0 (32.0)	2.7 (36.9)	6.0 (42.8)	10.0 (50.0)	14.7 (58.5)	16.5 (61.7)	16.0 (60.8)	11.9 (53.4)	8.0 (46.4)	4.2 (39.6)	1.2 (34.2)	7.6 (45.7)
Average precipitation mm (inches)	57.2 (2.25)	37.5 (1.48)	38.3 (1.51)	60.6 (2.39)	99.2 (3.91)	85.1 (3.35)	74.1 (2.92)	89.1 (3.51)	44.2 (1.74)	52.2 (2.06)	47.1 (1.85)	30.4 (1.20)	714.9 (28.15)
Average precipitation days (≥ 1.0 mm)	9.5	8.5	10.7	10.4	11.3	11.9	11.5	10.8	9.5	9.1	9.7	10.7	123.6
Average relative humidity (%)	84	80	75	72	73	74	74	77	81	85	86	85	79
Mean monthly sunshine hours	54	83	157	207	208	252	280	246	189	121	60	53	1,910
Source 1: DWD and MeteoSchweiz (unavailable)
Source 2: weather-online

Climate data for Konstanz (Mainau Forest), elevation: 447 m, 1961-1990 normals and extremes
Month	Jan	Feb	Mar	Apr	May	Jun	Jul	Aug	Sep	Oct	Nov	Dec	Year
Record high °C (°F)	14.2 (57.6)	17.4 (63.3)	24.4 (75.9)	28.0 (82.4)	33.1 (91.6)	33.7 (92.7)	36.0 (96.8)	33.5 (92.3)	30.5 (86.9)	27.5 (81.5)	22.0 (71.6)	17.0 (62.6)	36.0 (96.8)
Mean daily maximum °C (°F)	2.4 (36.3)	4.6 (40.3)	9.5 (49.1)	14.0 (57.2)	18.6 (65.5)	21.8 (71.2)	24.1 (75.4)	23.3 (73.9)	20.1 (68.2)	13.8 (56.8)	7.2 (45.0)	3.3 (37.9)	13.6 (56.4)
Daily mean °C (°F)	0.0 (32.0)	1.3 (34.3)	4.7 (40.5)	8.7 (47.7)	13.1 (55.6)	16.3 (61.3)	18.5 (65.3)	17.7 (63.9)	14.7 (58.5)	9.7 (49.5)	4.3 (39.7)	1.0 (33.8)	9.2 (48.5)
Mean daily minimum °C (°F)	−2.2 (28.0)	−1.4 (29.5)	1.1 (34.0)	4.2 (39.6)	8.2 (46.8)	11.6 (52.9)	13.6 (56.5)	13.4 (56.1)	10.7 (51.3)	6.8 (44.2)	2.0 (35.6)	−1.0 (30.2)	5.6 (42.1)
Record low °C (°F)	−21.8 (−7.2)	−21.5 (−6.7)	−17.5 (0.5)	−6.2 (20.8)	−4.4 (24.1)	0.2 (32.4)	3.7 (38.7)	4.0 (39.2)	−0.5 (31.1)	−4.0 (24.8)	−9.5 (14.9)	−14.0 (6.8)	−21.8 (−7.2)
Average precipitation mm (inches)	52.0 (2.05)	51.0 (2.01)	51.0 (2.01)	68.0 (2.68)	85.0 (3.35)	105.0 (4.13)	102.0 (4.02)	88.0 (3.46)	71.0 (2.80)	54.0 (2.13)	65.0 (2.56)	57.0 (2.24)	849 (33.44)
Average precipitation days (≥ 1.0 mm)	10.0	9.0	10.0	11.0	13.0	12.0	12.0	12.0	8.0	8.0	10.0	10.0	125
Mean monthly sunshine hours	43.0	73.4	124.9	161.7	198.6	218.1	244.6	215.3	171.1	99.8	52.6	37.0	1,640.1
Source: NOAA

== Notable people ==
=== Public service and commerce ===
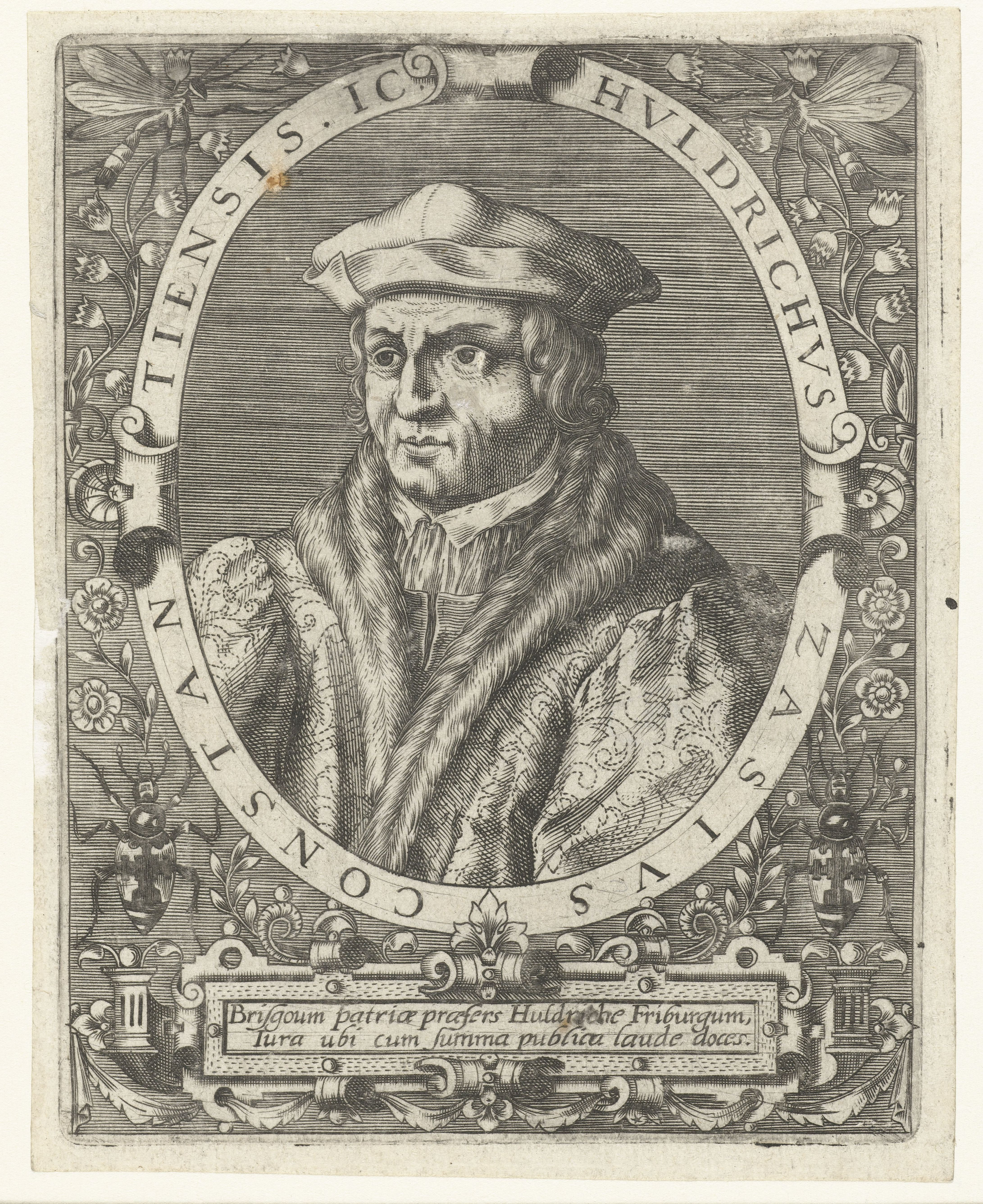
Ulrich Zasius

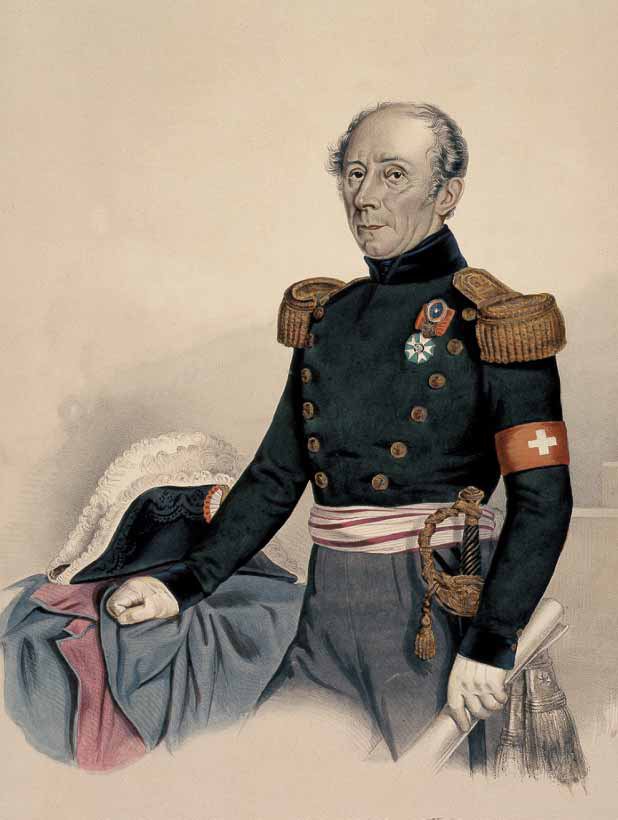
Guillaume Henri Dufour

- Ulrich Zasius (1461–1536), jurist
- Ernst Vögelin (1529–1589), pioneer book printer
- Wacker von Wackenfels (1550–1619), diplomat, scholar and author
- Johann Friedrich Cotta (1764–1832) a publisher, industrial pioneer and politician; in 1825 he started steamboats on Lake Constance.
- Johann Leonhard Hug (1765–1846) a Catholic theologian, orientalist and biblical scholar.
- Guillaume Henri Dufour (1787–1875) a Swiss military officer, structural engineer and topographer.
- Count Ferdinand von Zeppelin (1838–1917), a German general and inventor of the Zeppelin rigid airships.
- Josef Albert Amann (junior) (1866–1919), gynecologist
- Conrad Grober (1872–1948), priest and archbishop, teacher and pastor in Konstanz
- Friedrich Flick (1883–1972), entrepreneur and convicted Nazi war criminal
- Michaela von Neipperg (1885–1957), countess and Benedictine nun, religious superior at the Municipal Women's Clinic Konstanz
- Siegfried Adolf Handloser (1885–1954), doctor of the German Armed Forces Medical Services
- Melanie Risch (1887–1944), victim of Nazism
- Werner Berger (1901–1964), SS-Oberscharführer, member of commando 99 in Buchenwald concentration camp
- Julius Federer (1911–1984), jurist
- Egon Mayer (1917–1944), fighter ace in the Luftwaffe during World War II
- Werner Maihofer (1918–2009), politician (FDP), member of Bundestag, minister of the interior (1974–1978)
- Theo Sommer (1930–2022), newspaper editor at Die Zeit since 1958, rising to editor-in-chief and publisher
- Berthold Keller (1927–2012), trade unionist
- Rolf Böhme (1934–2019), Staatssekretär (1978–1982), mayor of Freiburg (1982–2002)
- Horst Frank (b. 1949), jurist, Lord Mayor of Konstanz 1996–2012
- Ian Murdock (1973–2015), American software engineer, founder of the Debian project
- Larissa Vassilian (born 1976), German-Armenian journalist

=== The arts ===
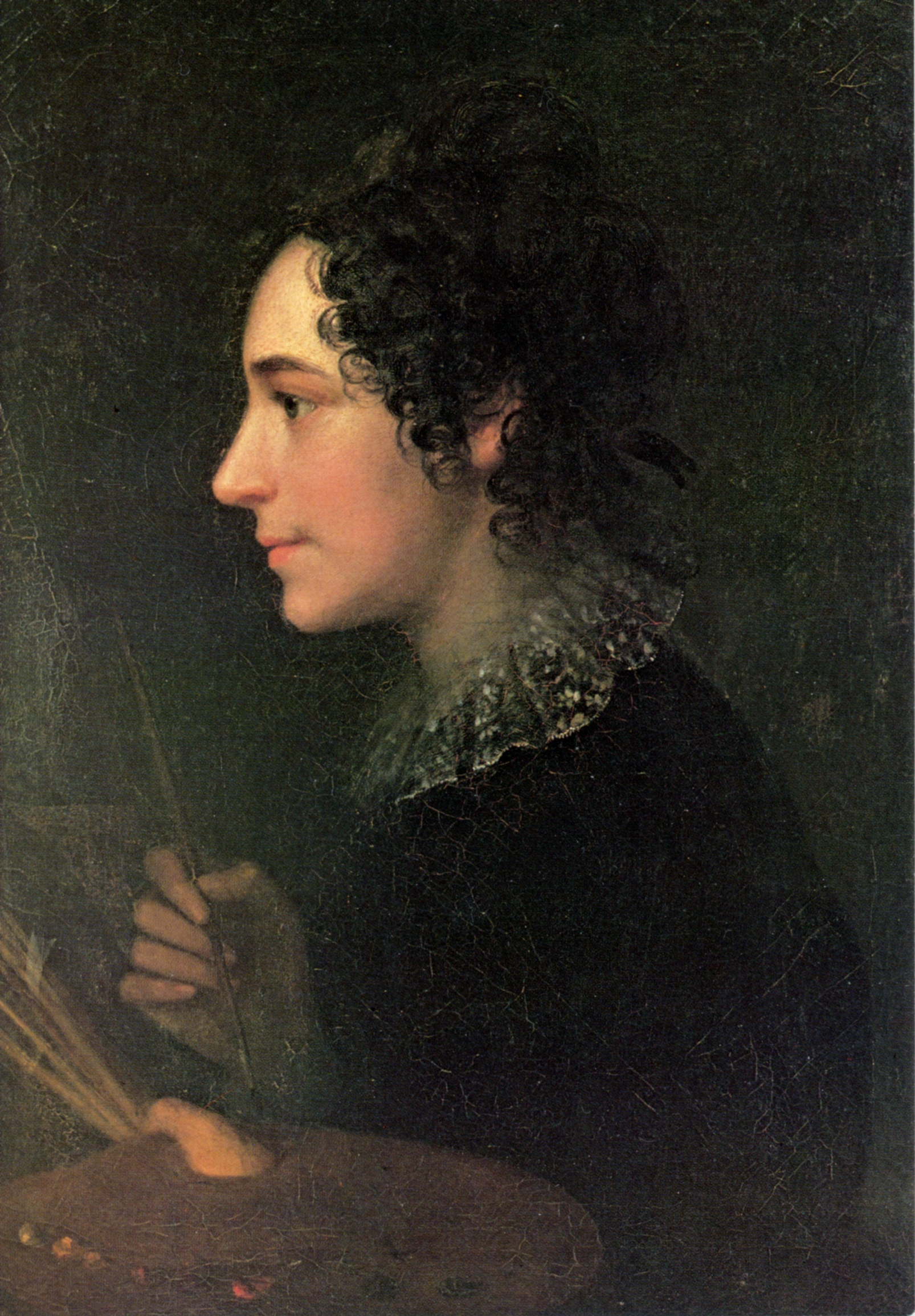
Marie Ellenrieder, self-portrait, 1819

- Tobias Pock (1609–1683), Austrian Baroque painter of Swabian descent, a pioneer of sacral art
- Marie Ellenrieder (1791–1863), painter
- Ida Maier-Müller (1821–1904) landscape painter and self-portraitist
- Jacob Picard (1883–1967), writer
- Anne Winterer (1894–1938), photographer
- François Stahly (1911–2006), French sculptor
- Hans Maria Wingler (1920–1984), art historian and founder of Bauhaus-Archive
- Rosemarie Banholzer (born 1925), dialect author
- Martin Gotthard Schneider (1930–2017), church musician, songwriter and theologian
- Uli Trepte (1941–2009), musician
- Helmut-Ulrich Weiss (born 1947), filmmaker and educator
- Beate Honsell-Weiss (born 1952), visual artist
- Carola Zwick (born 1966), product designer

== Twin towns – sister cities ==
Konstanz is twinned with:

- Fontainebleau, France (1960)
- Richmond upon Thames, England, United Kingdom (1983)
- Tábor, Czech Republic (1984)
- Lodi, Italy (1986)
- Suzhou, China (2007)

== Gallery ==
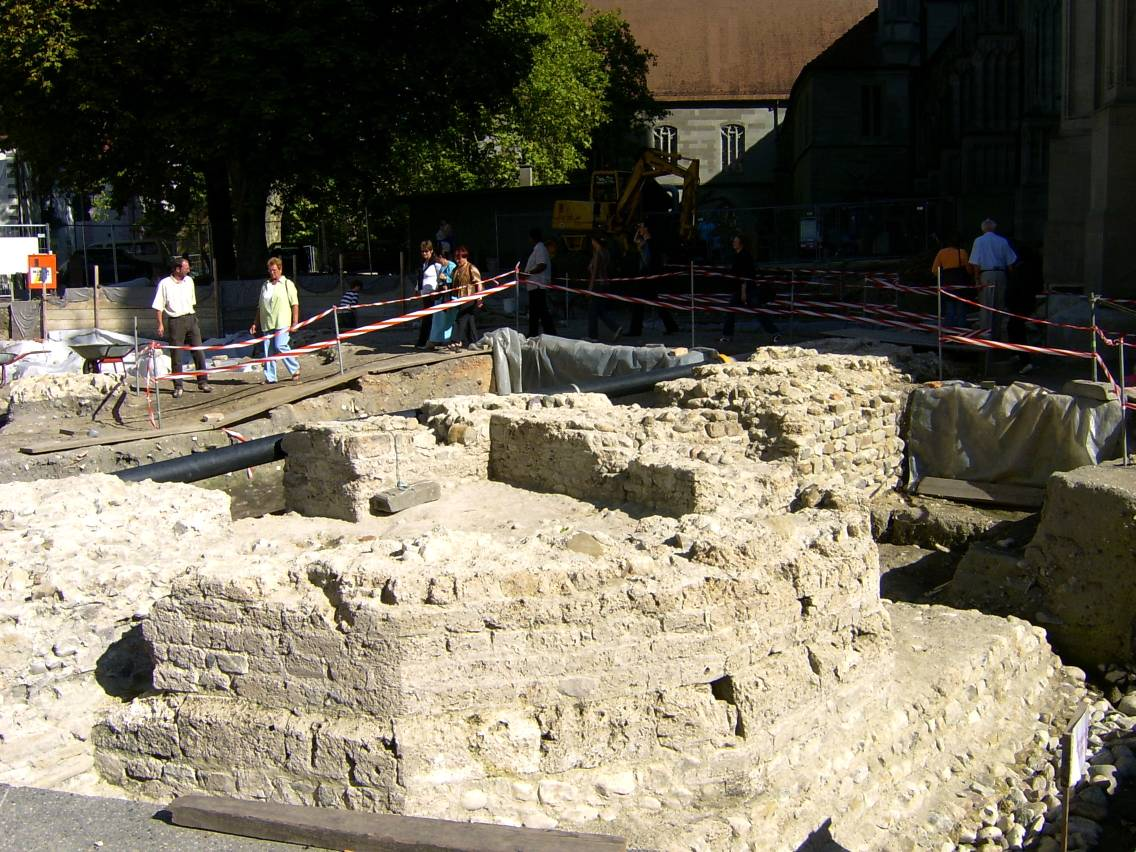
The late Roman fortress Constantia at the Münsterplatz

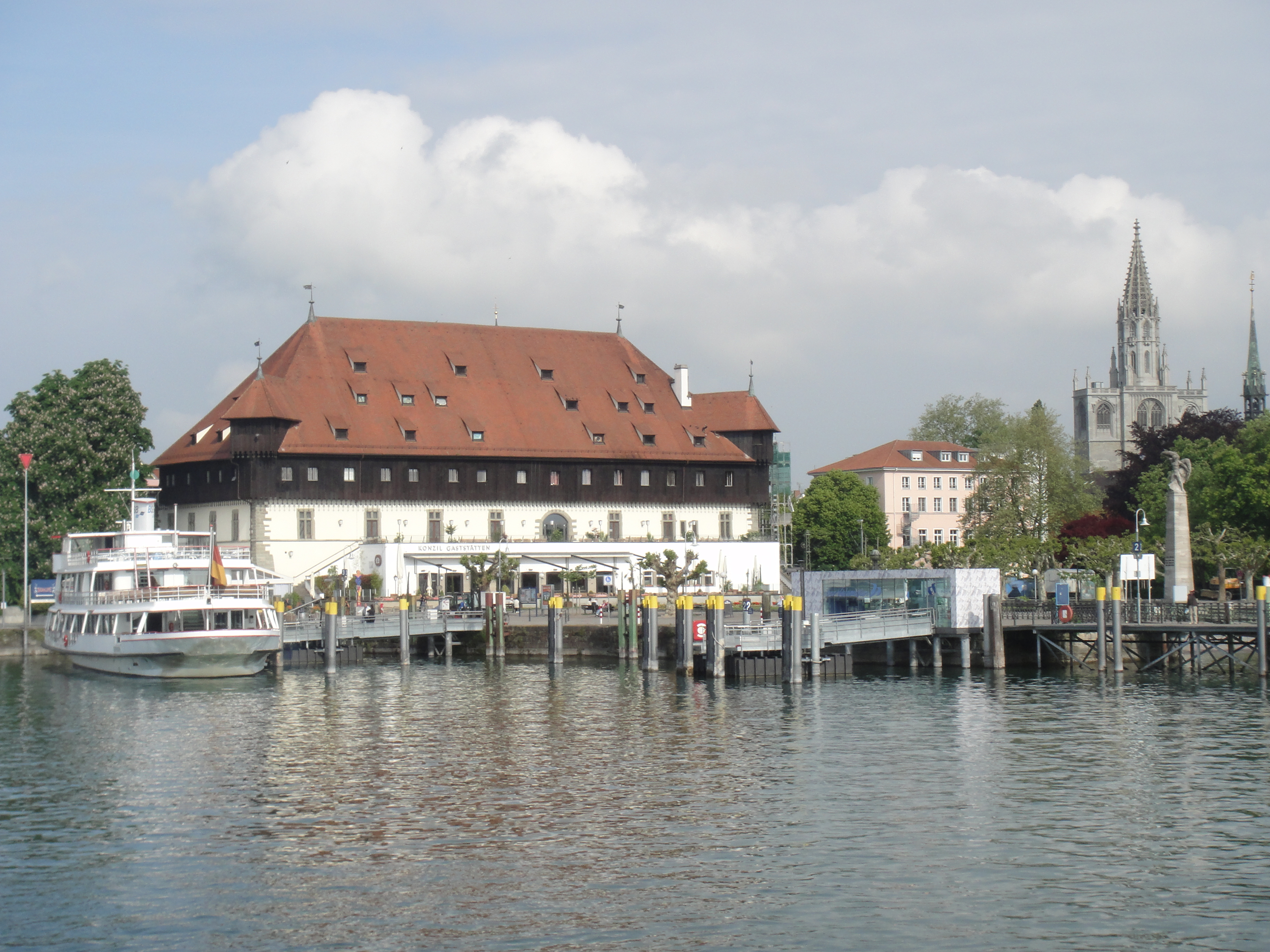
The Konzilgebäude in Konstanz

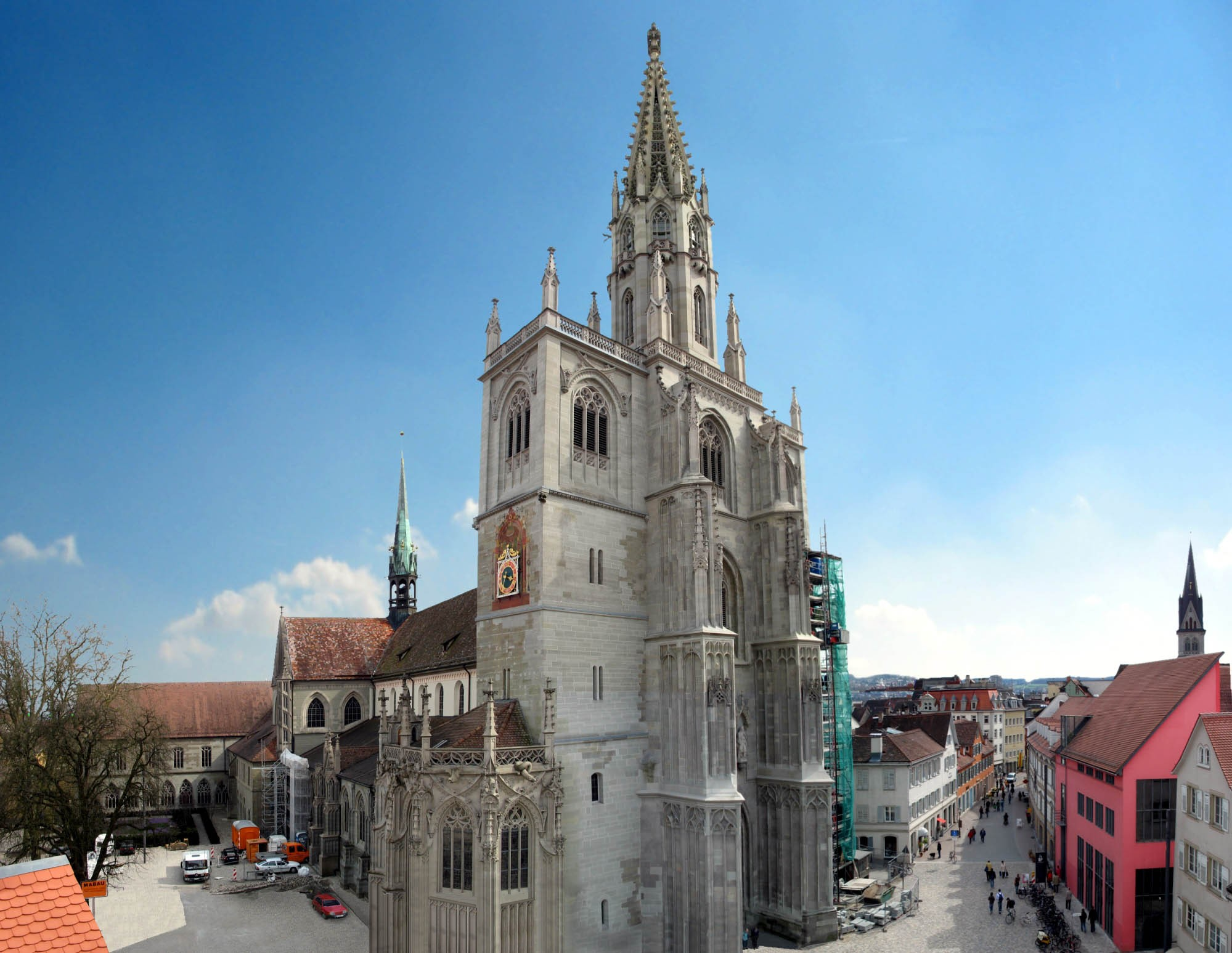
Konstanz Cathedral

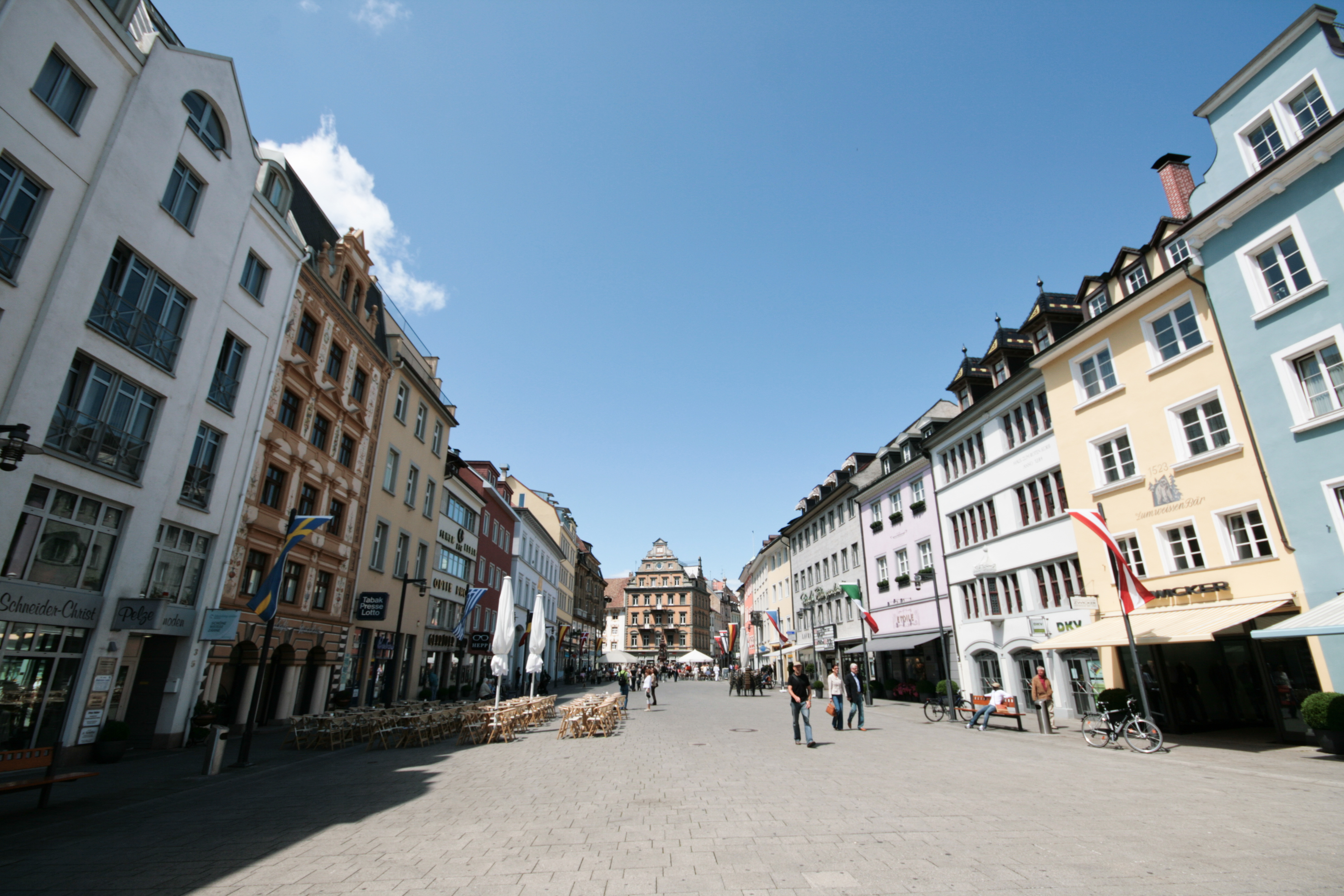
Konstanz Marktstätte, the main square in the old town

== See also ==
- Alexander-von-Humboldt-Gymnasium
- Cathedral of Konstanz
- Hochschule Konstanz (University of Applied Sciences)
- University of Konstanz
- Tägermoos
