= Singen-Landesgartenschau station =

Railway station in Singen (Hohentwiel), Germany

Singen-Landesgartenschau
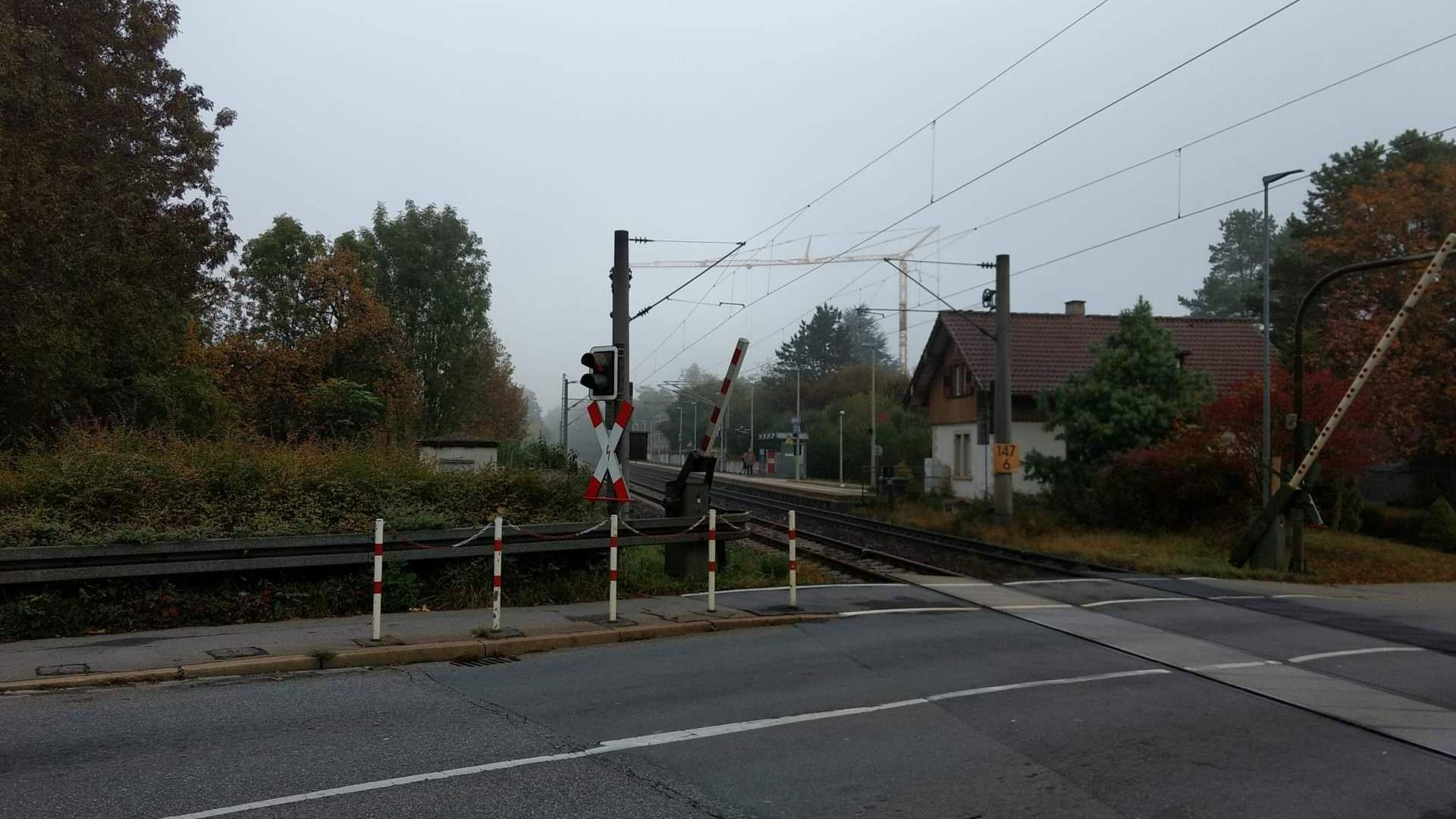
- The station in 2016

General information
- Location: Singen, Baden-Württemberg; Germany
- Coordinates: 47°45′43.326″N 08°49′38.784″E
- Owner: DB Netz
- Lines: Black Forest Railway (KBS 720)
- Platforms: 2 side platforms
- Tracks: 2
- Train operators: SBB GmbH

Other information
- Fare zone: 2 (Verkehrsverbund Hegau-Bodensee)

Services
Preceding station	SBB Deutschland	Following station
Mühlhausen (b Engen) towards Engen	S6	Singen (Hohentwiel) towards Konstanz
Location
- Location within Baden-Württemberg Location within Germany

Singen-Landesgartenschau station (German: Bahnhof Singen-Landesgartenschau) is a railway station in the municipality of Singen, in Baden-Württemberg, Germany. It is located on the standard gauge Black Forest Railway of Deutsche Bahn.

== Services ==
As of the December 2022 timetable change, the following services stop at Singen-Landesgartenschau:

- Seehas S6: half-hourly service between Engen and Konstanz.

== See also ==
- Bodensee S-Bahn
- Rail transport in Germany
