= Mühlhausen-Ehingen =

- Municipality
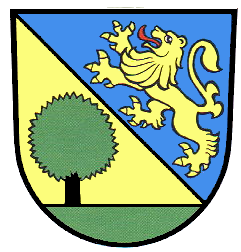
- Coat of arms

- Location of Mühlhausen-Ehingen within Konstanz district
- Interactive map of Mühlhausen-Ehingen
- Location within Germany Location within Baden-Württemberg
- Coordinates: 47°48′38″N 8°48′40″E
- Country: Germany
- State: Baden-Württemberg
- Admin. region: Freiburg
- District: Konstanz
- Subdivisions: 2

Government
  - Mayor (2021–29): Patrick Stärk

Area
  - Total: 17.82 km^{2} (6.88 sq mi)
- Elevation: 473 m (1,552 ft)

Population (2025-12-31)
  - Total: 4,109
  - Density: 230.6/km^{2} (597.2/sq mi)
- Time zone: UTC+01:00 (CET)
  - Summer (DST): UTC+02:00 (CEST)
- Postal codes: 78259
- Dialling codes: 07733
- Vehicle registration: KN
- Website: www.muehlhausen-ehingen.de

Mühlhausen-Ehingen (German pronunciation: [myːlˈhaʊzn̩ ˈʔeː(h)ɪŋən]) is a municipality in the district of Konstanz in Baden-Württemberg in Germany.

== Demographics ==
Population development:

Year	Inhabitants
1990	3,250
2001	3,688
2011	3,624
2021	3,938

== Transport ==
Mühlhausen (b Engen) railway station is served by a half-hourly operating regional train (S6, nicknamed Seehas), which runs between Engen and Konstanz, via Singen (Hohentwiel) and Radolfzell.

== Twin towns ==
Mühlhausen-Ehingen is twinned with:

- Domène, France, since 1997
