= Radolfzell–Mengen railway =

Railway line in Germany

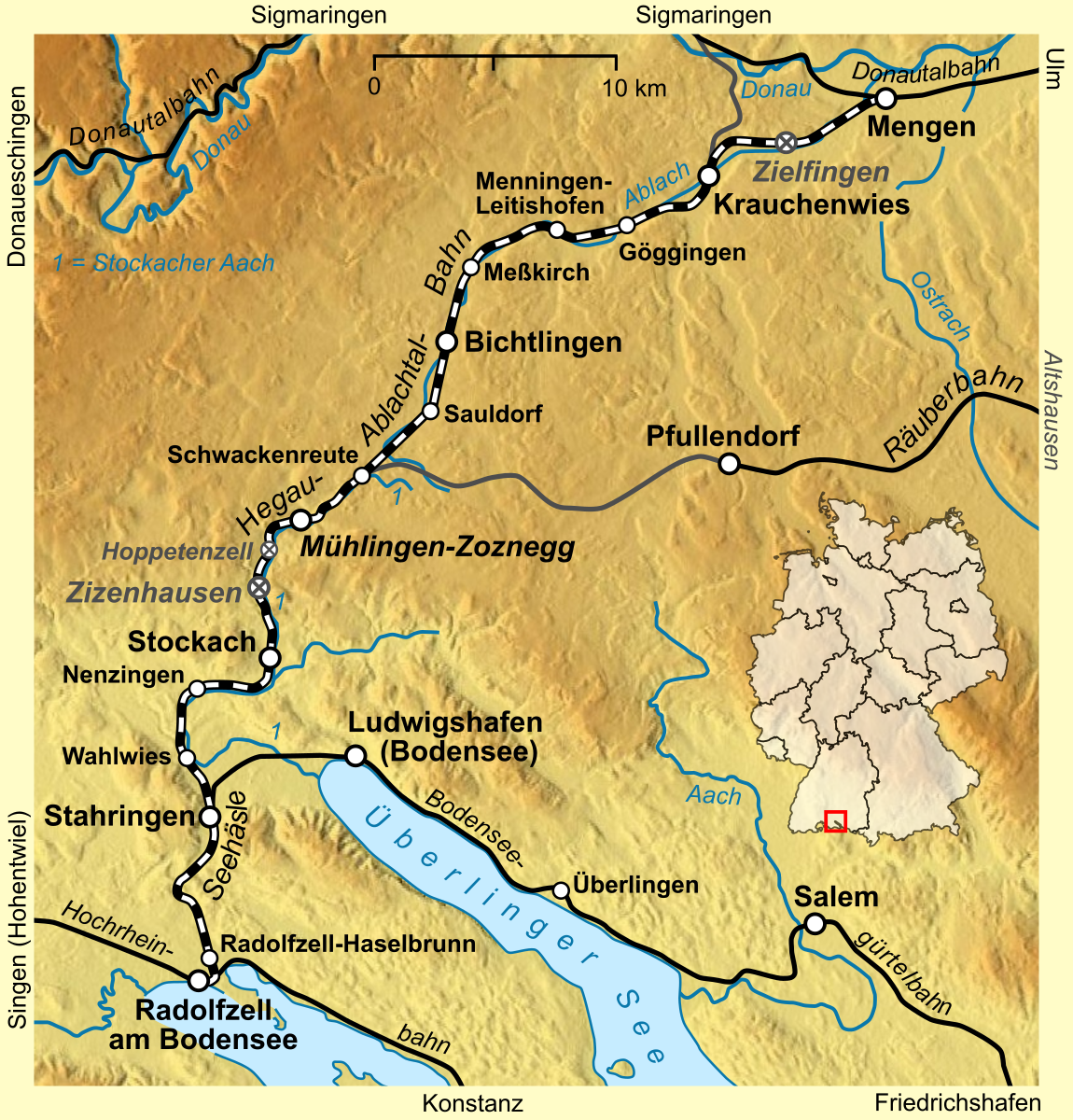

Overview
- Native name: Hegau-Ablachtal-Bahn
- Owner: DB (0.0–8.0 and 55.9–56.7); Lkr Konstanz (8.0–17.8); Ablachtalbahn (17.8–55.9)
- Line number: 4330
- Locale: Baden-Württemberg, Germany

Service
- Route number: 732, ex 304h

Technical
- Line length: 56.78 km (35.28 mi)
- Track gauge: 1,435 mm (4 ft 8 1/2 in) standard gauge
- Minimum radius: 245 m (804 ft)
- Maximum incline: 1.7%

The Radolfzell–Mengen railway (also called in German the Hegau-Ablachtal-Bahn—Hegau–Ablach Valley Railway) is a branch line in the German state of Baden-Württemberg. It runs from Radolfzell via Stockach to Mengen. The line was built as a mainline connection from Ulm via Lake Constance (Bodensee) to Switzerland. Regular passenger services were abandoned between 1972 and 1982. Passenger services were reactivated on the southern section between Radolfzell and Stockach in 1996 and has since been operated under the brand name of Seehäsle. The northern section from Stockach to Mengen is however only used for freight trains and passenger excursion trains. In 2005, it had to be temporarily closed because of the deterioration of the infrastructure on some sections. Since 2021, trains have once again been running between Stockach and Mengen on Sundays and public holidays under the brand name of Biberbahn.

== Description of line and route ==
The brand name Seehäsle is based on the brand name Seehas (named after a mythical "lake hare"), which is used for the S-Bahn-like services of the former Mittelthurgau-Bahn (now operated by SBB GmbH, a subsidiary of the Swiss Federal Railways) in the Konstanz district on the line between Konstanz and Engen. The original name of the line as the Hegau-Ablach Valley Railway (Hegau-Ablachtal-Bahn) is still common, as the line runs through the Hegau, running from the vicinity of Schwackenreute parallel with the Ablach river to Mengen. In Stahringen, the Stahringen–Friedrichshafen railway branches from the line to Friedrichshafen and Lindau.

== History ==
On 2 September 1859, an international meeting of delegates from the region between the Alps, Lake Constance and the Black Forest adopted a proposal for the construction of a railway line between Ulm, Lake Constance and the Black Forest. Railway committees were established in all the cities on the planned route.

These committees planned a new line from Ulm via Ehingen, Riedlingen, Mengen, Meßkirch, Stockach, Radolfzell, Singen, Schaffhausen, Waldshut and Säckingen to Basel and a branch from Meßkirch via Tuttlingen and Donaueschingen to Freiburg and beyond via the Rhine and the Vosges as far as Chaumont. They considered this route of great importance because it would be part of the shortest route between Vienna and Paris and would also gain importance as part of the shortest route from Berlin and Milan, running via Leipzig, Nuremberg, Ulm, Radolfzell, Schaffhausen and Zurich.

In 1866, the loose German Confederation collapsed, but the sovereign states of the Grand Duchy of Baden, the Kingdom of Prussia and the Kingdom of Württemberg signed trilateral treaties to promote the "transnational" rail project and its passage through the Prussian Hohenzollern Province.

These treaties permitted, among other projects, the construction of the Tübingen–Sigmaringen railway, the Ulm–Sigmaringen railway and the Radolfzell–Mengen/Sigmaringen and Schwackereute–Altshausen lines. The lines would connect the Grand Duchy of Baden State Railway and the Royal Württemberg State Railways at Sigmaringen, Mengen and Pfullendorf.

The two southern states committed to the precise routed planned so that their lines could attract as much through traffic as possible. Württemberg began the construction from Ulm to Mengen, while Baden delayed its part of the project.

=== Construction of the Hegau-Ablach Valley Railway ===
The construction of the Hegau-Ablach Valley between 1865 and 1873 by the Baden State Railways was preceded by consideration of the route by regional planning bodies and the local railway committees.

The Hegau-Ablach Valley was built in several sections and opened as follows.

The Radolfzell–Meßkirch section was built between 1866 and 1870. The embankment was designed for a two-track line, as were the stone abutments of the bridges, which can still be seen in the two main bridges between Mühlingen and Zizenhausen. However, it has never had more than one track north of Stahringen. The first section from Radolfzell to Stahringen and Stockach was opened on 20 July 1867. (Note: According to another source 10 July 1867) It was followed by the opening of the Stockach–Schwackenreute–Meßkirch section on 3 February 1870.

The continuation of the line between Meßkirch and Mengen needed to cross the Prussian Hohenzollern Province. Prussia did not seek to build its own railway in southern Germany but wished to see the two main cities of the province connected to the rail network of the neighbouring countries. In authorising the passage of the line through the Hohenzollern district of Krauchenwies, Prussia introduced the condition that Baden would have to build a branch line from Krauchenwies to Sigmaringen. Thus, the two lines, Meßkirch–Mengen and Krauchenwies–Sigmaringen, were then built at the expense of Baden in 1873. The two lines ran parallel to each other from Krauchenwies station through the royal park. In the park the remnants of the rail sidings and piers of the Ablach bridge mark the formerly double-track line. Further away, in the vicinity of the modern lakeside resort of Steidlesee, the Krauchenwies–Sigmaringen line branched off to the north. On 6 September 1873, the section from Meßkirch via Krauchenwies to Mengen was opened together with the line from Krauchenwies to Sigmaringen. Prussia also achieved a connection of the railways of neighbouring countries to the Hohenzollern Province in Hechingen without having to build its own rail network.

There was local resistance to the construction of branch lines from Meßkirch to Pfullendorf and from Meßkirch to Tuttlingen, although the route of the latter line had already been marked out. The engineer Robert Gerwig, who had designed the Black Forest Railway and the line from Radolfzell to Meßkirch, moved the planned railway junction at Meßkirch to a green fields site near Schwackereute. Schwackereute station was designed on a large site as a crossing station. So the Baden State Railways opened a connection from Schwackereute to Pfullendorf (the western part of the Altshausen–Schwackenreute railway) on 11 August 1873. A fork was also projected to the Black Forest to the west of Schwackereute, bypassing Tuttlingen to a junction with the Black Forest Railway in Hattingen. The plan was not executed but instead Württemberg built the Danube Valley Railway (see Ulm–Sigmaringen railway and Tuttlingen–Inzigkofen railway) from Mengen via Sigmaringen and Tuttlingen to Immendingen.

The regional function of the line was fulfilled only in part–no trains ran on the Ulm–Radolfzell route. On 1 November 1873, a fast pair of trains was introduced, requiring 100 minutes to run from Radolfzell via Mengen to Ulm, but in 1875 it was abandoned for lack of profitability as there was little demand. In 1879, the Hegau-Ablach Valley Railway was downgraded to a branch line. The whole line was now served by local trains, which stopped at all stations.

=== The line and the Second World War ===
In the Second World War the Hegau-Ablach Valley Railway was involved in the war effort. From the summer of 1944, it had become apparent that the Allies had air supremacy in the south of the country. Low-flying air raids, unscathed by the barely functioning German air defences, targeted military and transport infrastructure.

On 24 July 1944, fighter-bombers attacked a freight train loaded with cattle between Bichtlingen and Meßkirch and a farmer and livestock trader and businessman from Messkirch was killed.

With progressive loss of air superiority during the day it was soon not possible to operate on the line. In early 1945, a train was fired on between Stockach and Schwackereute. Two 17 years boys aged were killed by machine-gun fire in the course on the way home from Überlingen.

On 22 February 1945, shortly before the end of the war, seven American Mosquito fighter-bombers attacked the major stations along the Singen–Mengen–Ulm line, as part of the Allied Operation Clarion, intending to make the line unusable through targeted attacks. They also targeted Singen, Stockach and Mengen. In Meßkirch fighter bombers fired on the station, a freight train and a shunting locomotive.

=== Between closure and preservation ===
The route was closed by Deutsche Bundesbahn in stages, passenger traffic on the Krauchenwies–Mengen section were closed on 13 December 1954, all traffic ended on 1 September 1960 and this section of line was then dismantled. Here, the rails were removed from the Krauchenwies station premises to the connection with the siding to Dillmannschen sawmill near Mengen. The passenger services on the line between Meßkirch and Krauchenwies were closed on 1 June 1969. Not even three years later, on 28 May 1972, passenger services on the Stockach–Meßkirch section were closed. Ten years later, on 25 September 1982, (Note: According to another source, 26 September 1982) this was followed by the closure of the southern section from Stockach to Radolfzell.

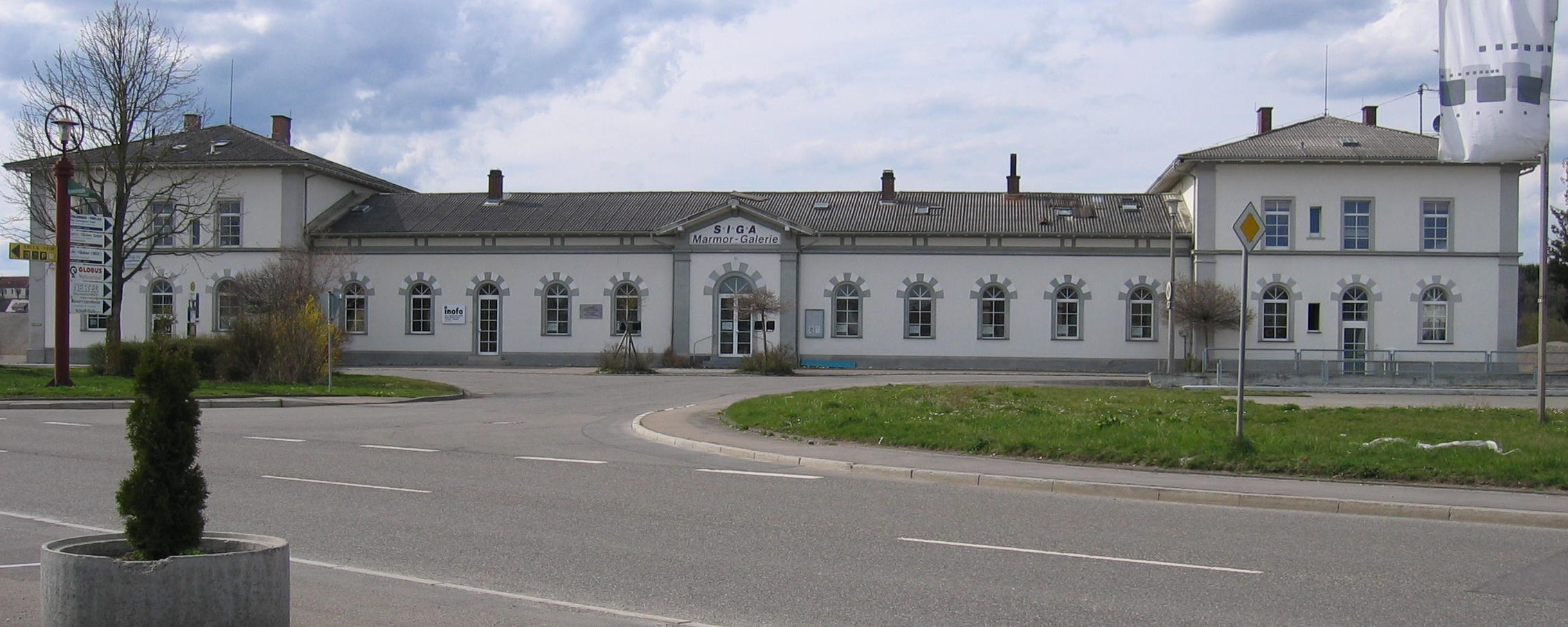
Krauchenwies station

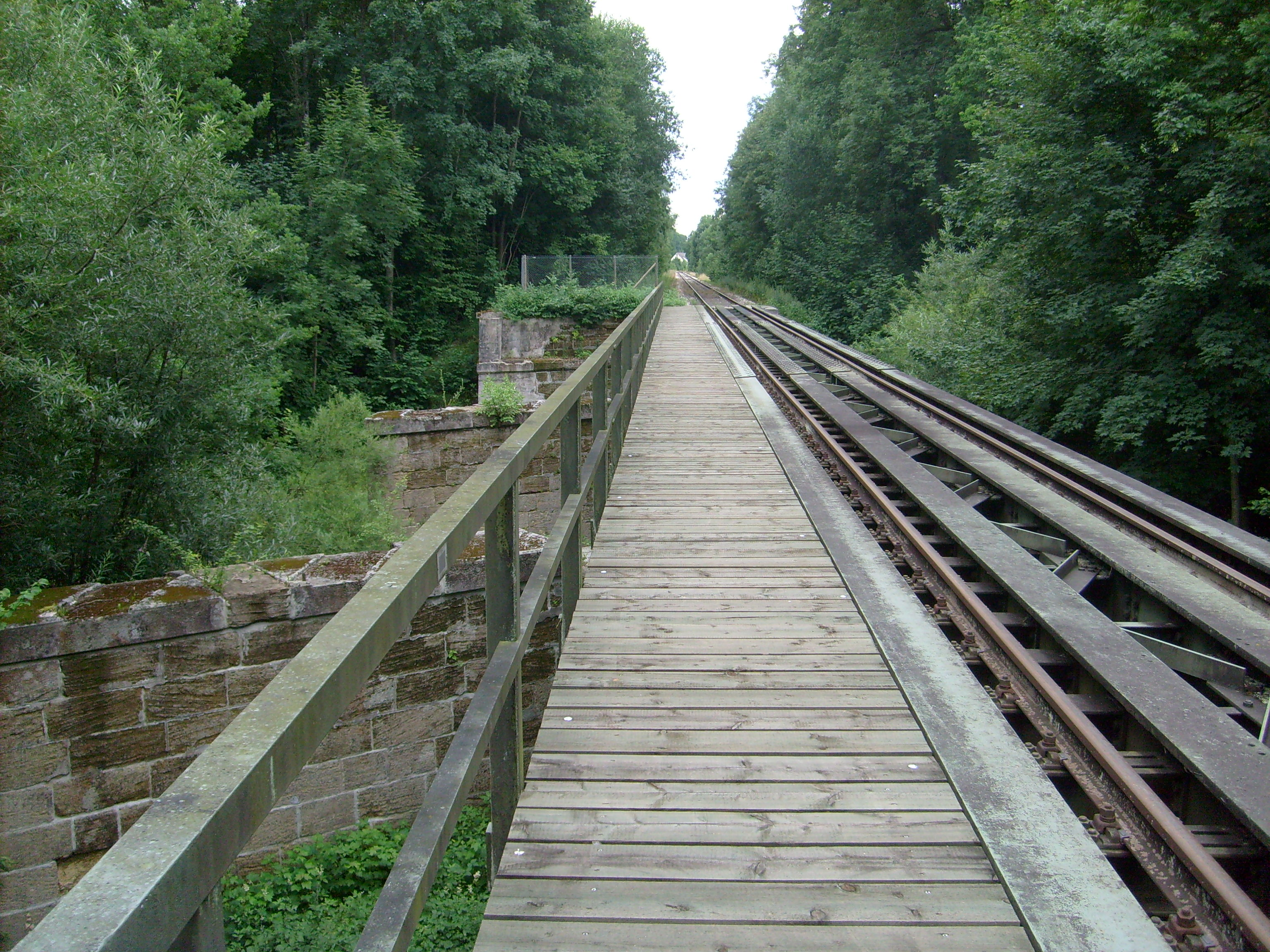
Bridge over the Ablach in the royal park in Krauchenwies

On 29 September 1986, at the initiative of the Tegometall company, the Krauchenwies–Mengen section was returned to service after it had been rebuilt with state subsidies for freight. A siding, which was about 900 meters long, was built south of Ablacher Straße to the company's works. After the construction of two railway crossings on federal highway 311 and state highway 456 and the bridge over the Andelsbach, the line was ready for freight operations. The track from the Tegometall works to Mengen was officially classed as a"siding of Mengen station”, as on the same day, 29 September 1986, freight traffic was abandoned on the Meßkirch–Krauchenwies line. (Note: According to other information the Krauchenwies–Mengen line was decommissioned in 1960 and subsequently dismantled; it was reopened on 1 October after the laying of new tracks. At the same time the Meßkirch–Krauchenwies was closed and the tracks were later removed. see "Einstmals". Südkurier (in German). 26 October 2011.) The line was formally closed on 1 March 1987, but it was reopened for freight traffic on 28 May 1989.

As a result of rail reform and regionalisation of the railways in the 1990s, there was a renaissance of rail transport, which also benefited the Hegau-Ablach Valley Railway. On 8 September 1996, the abandoned section between Stockach and Radolfzell was reactivated for passengers and operated by the Mittelthurgaubahn. The district of Constance (Konstanz) rented the section between Stahringen and Stockach from Deutsche Bahn, which let it fundamentally reorganise it.

=== Operations between Radolfzell and Stockach, 1996–2006 ===
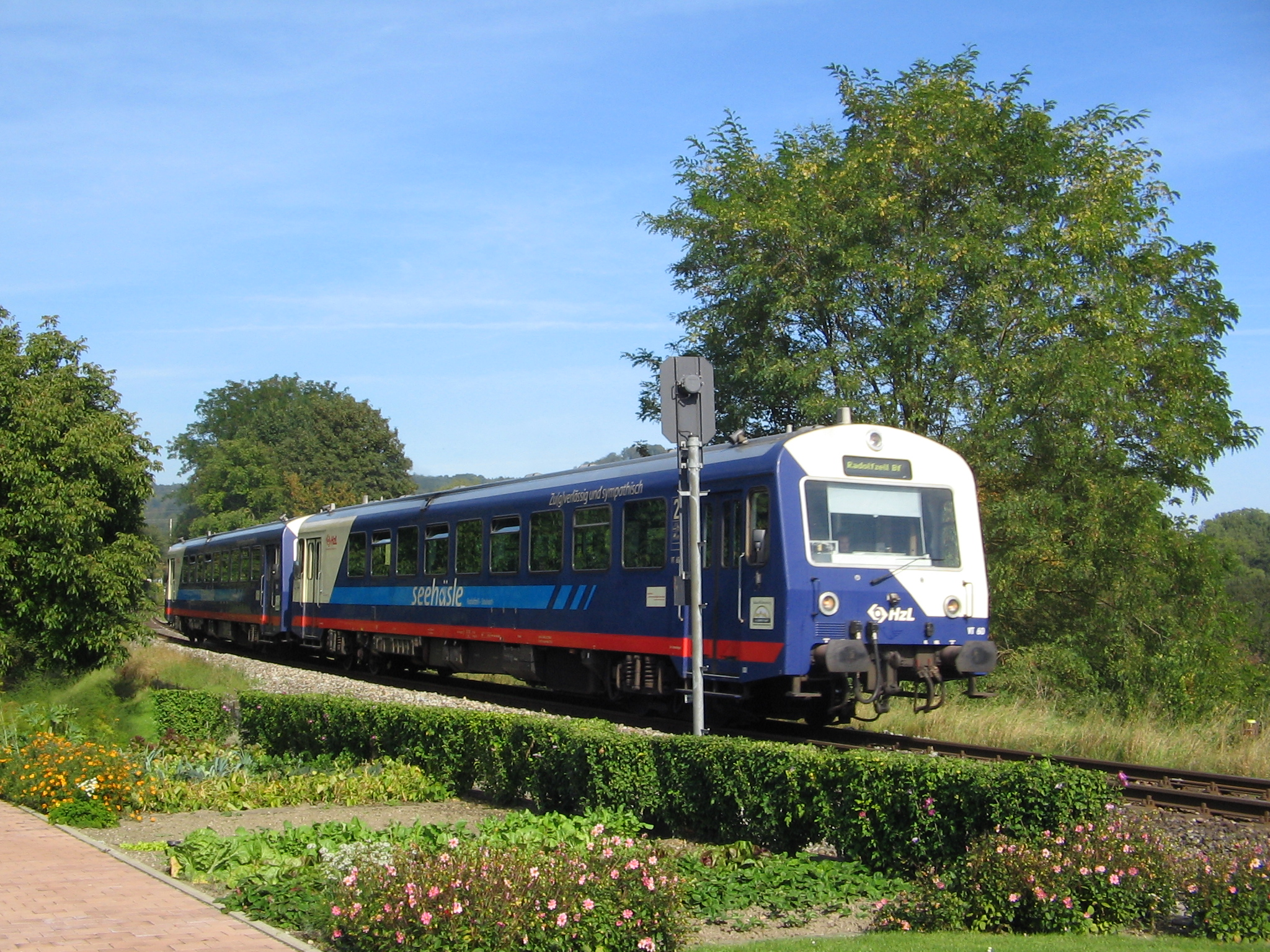
NE 81 set in the depot of the HzL in Immendingen

Following the reactivation of the regional rail services in 1996, the Seehäsle services were operated by Mittelthurgaubahn using three prototypes of class GTW 2/6 diesel multiple units of Swiss manufacturer Stadler Rail (Bm 596 671–673). From 2005, two additional converted control cars were used because of the large demand for school transport.

After the liquidation of Mittelthurgaubahn in 2003, the operation was taken over by EuroTHURBO, which in turn was incorporated as part of the German SBB subsidiary SBB GmbH in 2005.

Due to frequent breakdowns of the GTW sets, a variety of replacement vehicles were used from 2001: these included a MAN railbus set (class VT 98 + VS 98) of the Hochwald Railway, a RegioSprinter of the Rurtalbahn GmbH and Regio-Shuttles of the Hohenzollerische Landesbahn (HzL). From October 2005 all three of the GTW sets were out of operations; they were replaced by a MAN railbus set and three NE 81 sets (built by Duewag and Waggon Union) owned by Bodensee-Oberschwaben-Bahn. It was only from 28 August 2006 that the two refurbished GTW were used again.

Since the GTW prototypes could not be made permanently operational and SBB GmbH demanded funding for replacement vehicles, the agreement between the district of Constance and SBB GmbH was terminated at the end of 2006. The GTW prototypes were sold through an intermediary to the Italian company Ferrovie del Sud Est.

== Operations between Radolfzell and Stockach since 2006 ==
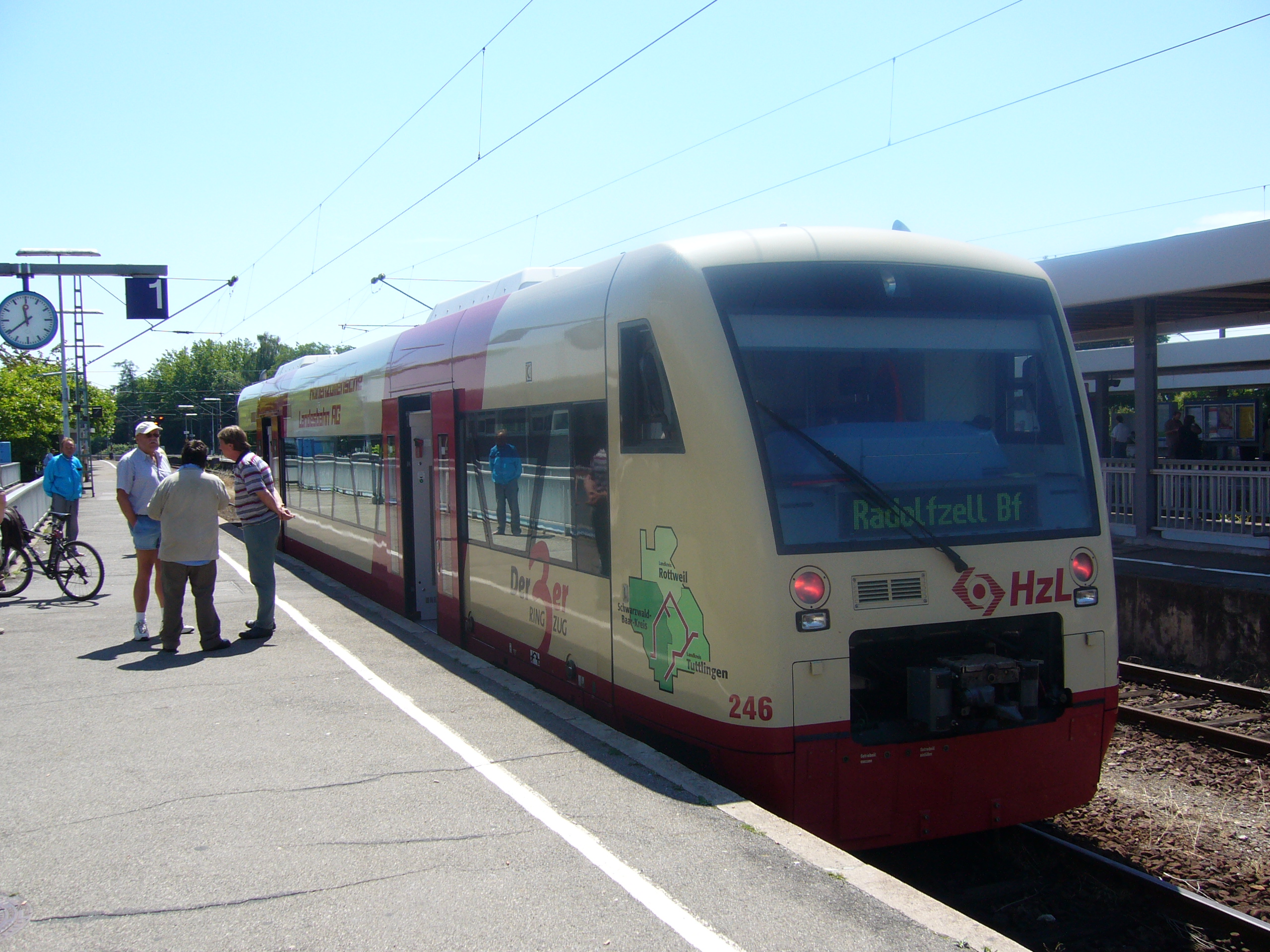
Ringzug-Regio-Shuttle running as the Seehäsle service in Radolfzell station

The HzL won the contracts for operations for both the periods of 2006–2008 and of 2009–2023. Until 2008 three NE 81 sets formerly operated by Bodensee-Oberschwaben-Bahn were used as an interim solution. Since they have been replaced by new Regio-Shuttle diesel multiple units (and the NE 81 sets were transferred to Südwestdeutsche Verkehrs-Aktiengesellschaft). Traffic is controlled from the HzL Ringzug (ring train) operations centre in Immendingen, where the railcars are also maintained. At peak times on weekdays services operate every half-hour between Radolfzell and Stockach. Outside the peaks and on weekends trains operate hourly, with convenient connections in Radolfzell towards Konstanz (Constance) and Singen, with generally poorer connections to the hourly services to Friedrichshafen.

In November 2008, all level crossings in Stahringen and Wahlwies were rebuilt and adapted to modern standards.
