= Bietingen station =

Railway station in Gottmadingen, Germany

Bietingen
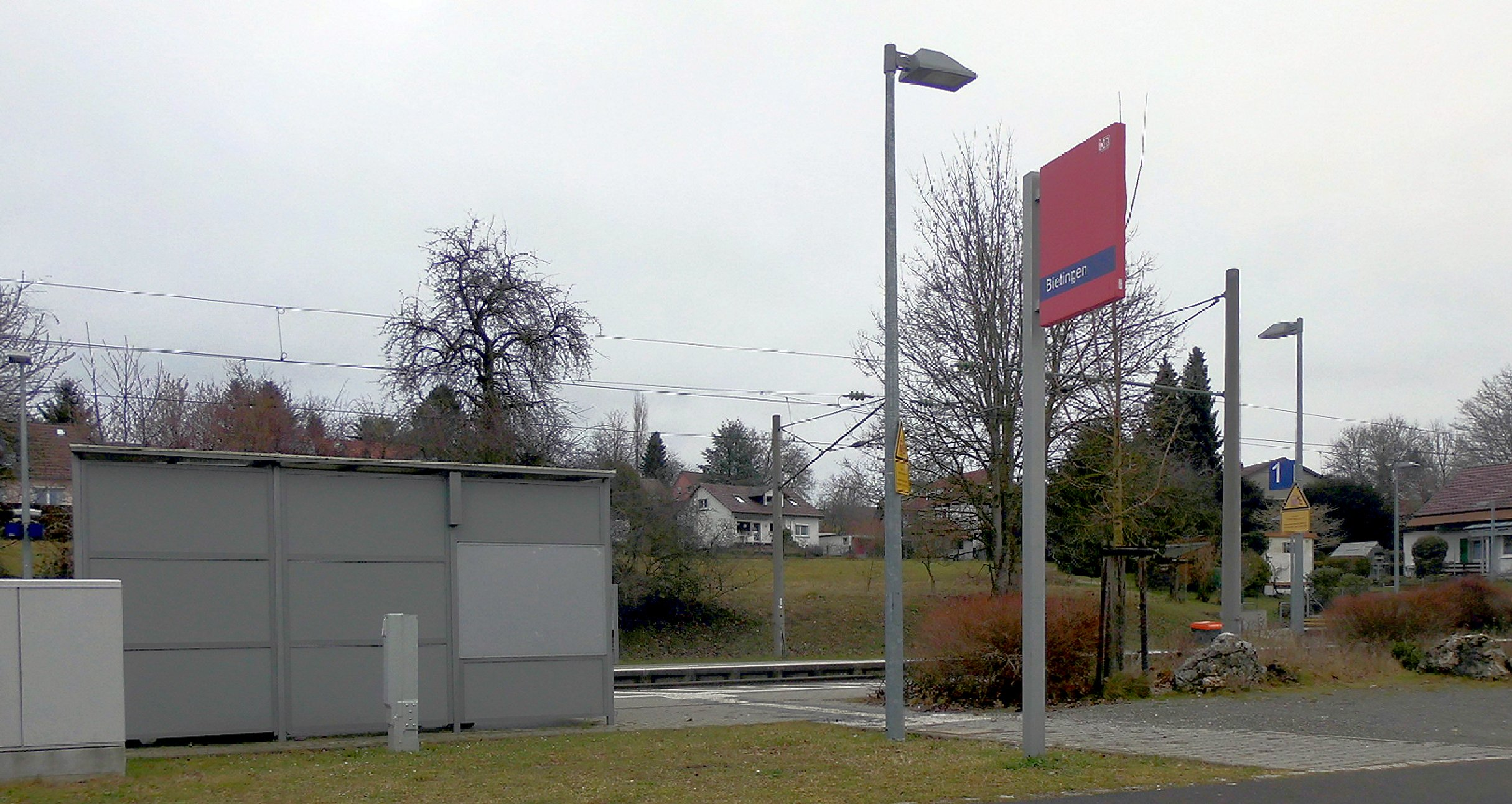
- The station in 2018

General information
- Location: Gottmadingen, Baden-Württemberg; Germany
- Coordinates: 47°44′38″N 8°44′20″E
- Owner: DB Netz
- Lines: High Rhine Railway (KBS 730)
- Distance: 375.6 km (233.4 mi) from Mannheim Hbf
- Platforms: 2 side platforms
- Tracks: 2
- Train operators: SBB GmbH
- Connections: Stadtbus Tuttlingen bus lines

Other information
- Fare zone: 2 (Verkehrsverbund Hegau-Bodensee)

Services
| Preceding station | Schaffhausen S-Bahn | Following station |
|---|---|---|
| Thayngen towards Schaffhausen | S62 | Gottmadingen towards Singen (Hohentwiel) |
Location
- Location within Baden-Württemberg Location within Germany

Bietingen station (German: Bahnhof Bietingen) is a railway station in Bietingen, in the municipality of Gottmadingen, in Baden-Württemberg, Germany. It is located on the standard gauge High Rhine Railway of Deutsche Bahn.

== Customs ==
Bietingen is, for customs purposes, a border station for passengers arriving from Switzerland. Customs checks may be performed in the station or on board trains by German officials. Systematic passport controls were abolished when Switzerland joined the Schengen Area in 2008.

== Services ==
As of the December 2022 timetable change, the following services stop at Bietingen:

- Schaffhausen S-Bahn S62: half-hourly service between Schaffhausen and Singen (Hohentwiel) (some trains continue to Radolfzell).

== See also ==
- Bodensee S-Bahn
- Rail transport in Germany
