= Gottmadingen station =

Railway station in Gottmadingen, Baden-Württemberg, Germany

Gottmadingen
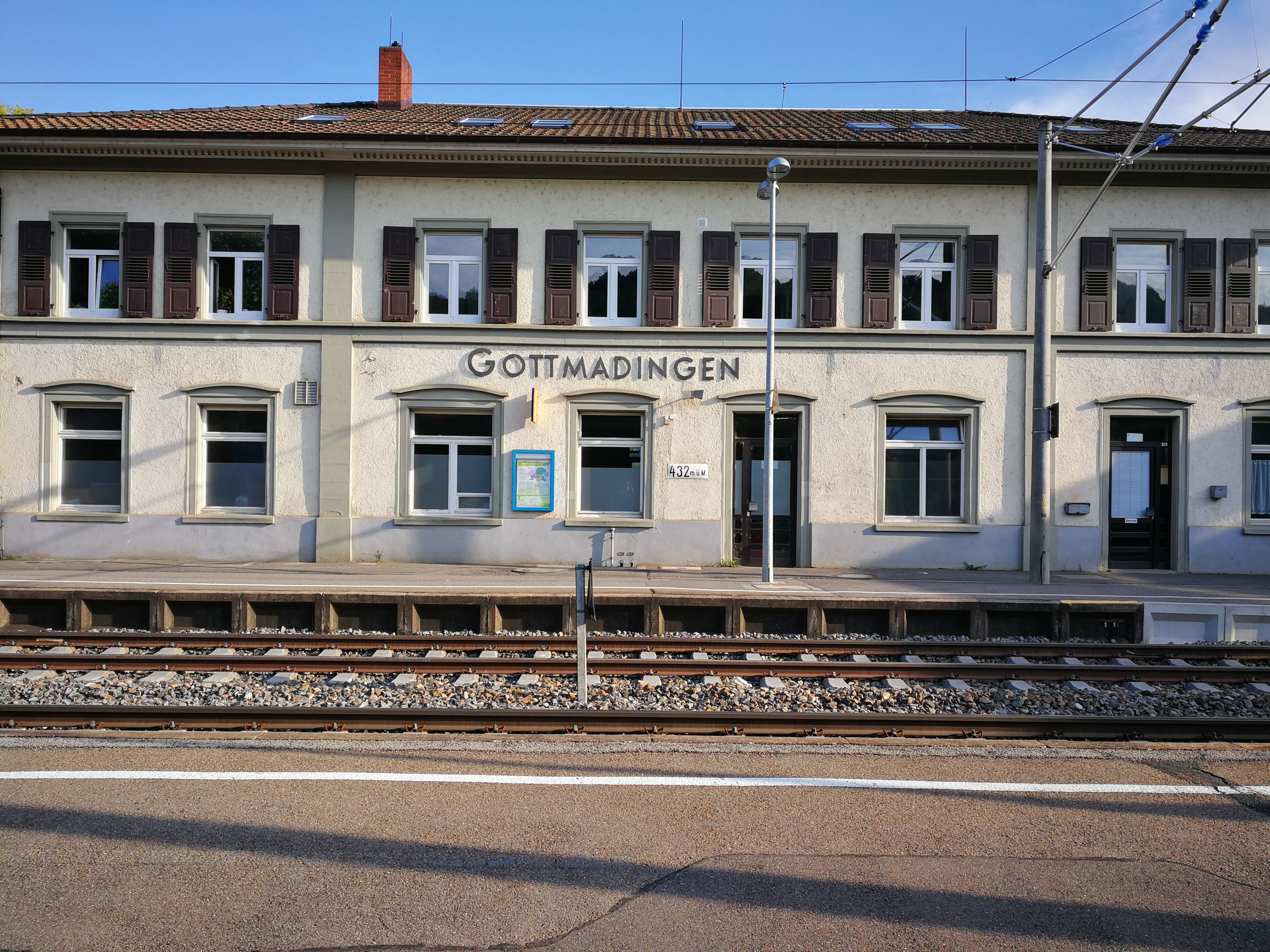
- The station in 2018

General information
- Location: Gottmadingen, Baden-Württemberg; Germany
- Coordinates: 47°44′15″N 8°46′32″E
- Owner: DB Netz
- Lines: High Rhine Railway (KBS 730)
- Distance: 378.5 km (235.2 mi) from Mannheim Hauptbahnhof
- Platforms: 2 side platforms
- Tracks: 2
- Train operators: SBB GmbH
- Connections: Stadtbus Tuttlingen bus lines

Other information
- Fare zone: 2 (Verkehrsverbund Hegau-Bodensee)

Services
| Preceding station | Schaffhausen S-Bahn | Following station |
|---|---|---|
| Bietingen towards Schaffhausen | S62 | Singen (Hohentwiel) Terminus |
Location

Gottmadingen station (German: Bahnhof Gottmadingen) is a railway station in the municipality of Gottmadingen, in Baden-Württemberg, Germany. It is located on the standard gauge High Rhine Railway of Deutsche Bahn.

== Services ==
As of the December 2022 timetable change, the following services stop at Gottmadingen:

- Schaffhausen S-Bahn S62: half-hourly service between Schaffhausen and Singen (Hohentwiel) (some trains continue to Radolfzell).

== See also ==
- Bodensee S-Bahn
- Rail transport in Germany
