= Mühlhausen (b Engen) station =

Railway station in Mühlhausen-Ehingen, Germany

Mühlhausen (b Engen)
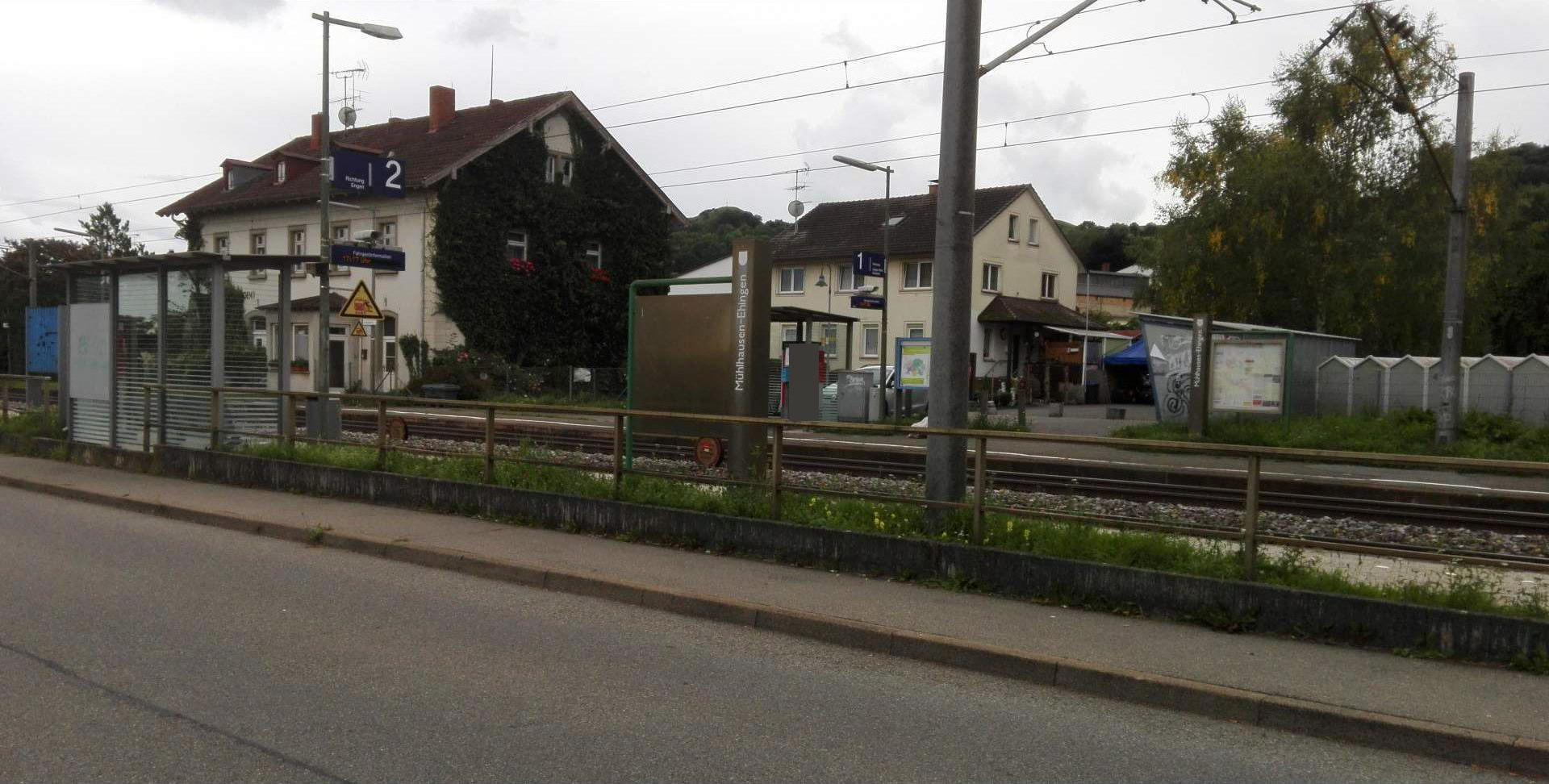
- The station in 2017

General information
- Location: Mühlhausen-Ehingen, Konstanz District, Baden-Württemberg; Germany
- Coordinates: 47°48′57.6972″N 08°48′11.0376″E
- Owner: DB Netz
- Lines: Black Forest Railway (KBS 720)
- Platforms: 2 side platforms
- Tracks: 2
- Train operators: SBB GmbH

Other information
- Fare zone: 1/2 (Verkehrsverbund Hegau-Bodensee)

Services
Preceding station	SBB Deutschland	Following station
Welschingen-Neuhausen towards Engen	S6	Singen-Landesgartenschau towards Konstanz
Location
- Location within Baden-Württemberg Location within Germany

Mühlhausen (b Engen) (German: Bahnhof Mühlhausen (b Engen)) is a railway station in the municipality of Mühlhausen-Ehingen, near Engen, in Baden-Württemberg, Germany. It is located on the standard gauge Black Forest Railway of Deutsche Bahn.

== Services ==
As of the December 2022 timetable change, the following services stop at Mühlhausen (b Engen):

- Seehas S6: half-hourly service between Engen and Konstanz.

== See also ==
- Bodensee S-Bahn
- Rail transport in Germany
