= Mühlhausen (disambiguation) =

Mühlhausen is a city in Thuringia, Germany.

Mühlhausen, German for "mill houses", may also refer to:

- German naval ship Mühlhausen, in service with the German Navy
- other places in Germany:
  - Mühlhausen, Affing, village in the municipality Affing near Augsburg, Bavaria, Germany
  - Mühlhausen, Kraichgau, municipality in Baden-Württemberg, Germany
  - Mühlhausen am Neckar, a town now part of the Stuttgart conglomerate in Baden-Württemberg
  - Mühlhausen bei Schwenningen, community of Villingen-Schwenningen in southern Baden-Württemberg, Germany
  - Mühlhausen-Ehingen, a municipality in southern Baden-Württemberg, Germany
  - Mühlhausen, Middle Franconia, in the district of Erlangen-Höchstadt, Bavaria
  - Mühlhausen, Upper Palatinate, in the district of Neumarkt, Bavaria
  - Mühlhausen, Kastl, in the district of Amberg-Sulzbach, Bavaria
- places outside Germany:
  - Mühlhausen an der Moldau, the former German name of Nelahozeves, Czech Republic
  - Mühlhausen, the former German name of Milevsko, Czech Republic
  - Mühlhausen in Ostpreußen, the former German name of Młynary, Poland
  - Mühlhausen (Kreis Preußisch Eylau), today Gvardeyskoye, Kaliningrad Oblast, Russia
  - Mülhausen, the German name for Mulhouse, France
  - Mulhausen, Bas-Rhin, village in France

== Railway stations ==
- Mühlhausen (b Engen), a railway station in Mühlhausen-Ehingen, Baden-Württemberg, Germany
- Mühlhausen (Thür), a railway station in Mühlhausen, Thuringia, Germany
