= Gottmadingen =

- Municipality
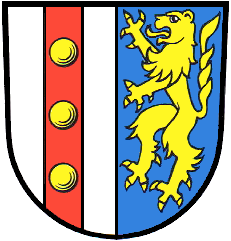
- Coat of arms

- Location of Gottmadingen within Konstanz district
- Interactive map of Gottmadingen
- Location within Germany Location within Baden-Württemberg
- Coordinates: 47°44′8″N 8°46′36″E
- Country: Germany
- State: Baden-Württemberg
- Admin. region: Freiburg
- District: Konstanz
- Subdivisions: 6

Government
  - Mayor (2020–28): Michael Klinger

Area
  - Total: 23.59 km^{2} (9.11 sq mi)
- Elevation: 437 m (1,434 ft)

Population (2025-12-31)
  - Total: 10,772
  - Density: 456.6/km^{2} (1,183/sq mi)
- Time zone: UTC+01:00 (CET)
  - Summer (DST): UTC+02:00 (CEST)
- Postal codes: 78244
- Dialling codes: 07731
- Vehicle registration: KN
- Website: www.gottmadingen.de

Gottmadingen is a municipality in the district of Konstanz, in Baden-Württemberg, Germany, situated on the Swiss border, 5 km southwest of Singen, and 12 km east of Schaffhausen.

A first mention of Gottmadingen was in 965. Until the construction of the Singen - Schaffhausen railway line it was a tiny village. Of historical interest is that on 9 April 1917, Vladimir Lenin accompanied by his wife and close friends, took a train from the Switzerland village of Schaffhausen and arrived in Gottmadingen. The German government had agreed to provide him with transportation to Russia. The German government hoped that with his arrival in Russia at this time would greatly aid Russias withdrawal from the war Economic growth began in the 20th century. Due to the high demand for workers in the new factories the number of inhabitants grew rapidly.

Gottmadingen's industry was mainly based on the production of agricultural machinery. In the years 1960s and 1970s more than 4,000 workers were employed in the "Fahr" factory for agricultural engines. The factory was closed in 2003. Today's economy is based on several companies that settled on the former "Fahr" factory area. Another notable industry in the town consisted of the local "Bilger" brewery, established in 1821. The brewery served as a staple of the area until its acquisition by Fürstenberg in 1968.

The municipal area of Gottmadingen comprises also the outlying villages of Bietingen, Ebringen and Randegg, as well as the hamlet Murbach. Both Bietingen and Gottmadingen itself have railway stations and benefit from rail connections to Schaffhausen and Singen. The village Randegg and the hamlet Murbach are served by buses from Switzerland with a connection to the Swiss villages Ramsen and Dörflingen as well as the city of Schaffhausen. The route also passes through the German exclave of Büsingen am Hochrhein and its outlying village Stemmer, crossing the international border four times.
