= Conrad Vetter =

German Jesuit preacher and polemical writer

Conrad Vetter (1547 – October 11, 1622) was a German Jesuit preacher and polemical writer.

== Biography ==
Conrad was born at Engen in Baden. He entered the priesthood and vigorously championed the Catholic cause in speech and writing.

While prefect of music in the collegiate church for nobles at Hall, he became more thoroughly informed concerning the Society of Jesus. As all he learned of it agreed with his desires, he asked to be received into the Society, and in 1576 entered the novitiate at Munich.

After completing his studies he was made academic preacher at Munich, on account of his unusual gift for oratory. He subsequently preached for several years at Ratisbon, where many Lutherans were converted to the Catholic Church by his sermons. At the same time Vetter developed an extraordinary activity as a writer.

He died at Munich on 11 October 1622.

== Writings ==
It is stated that his writings, large and small, number nearly one hundred; they were chiefly polemical. Unfortunately the tone is ordinarily not very refined. Vetter used all the coarseness of which the Swabian tongue is capable to disparage Luther; so that involuntarily Luther's similar style is recalled. In spite of this, or perhaps exactly for this reason, the little books found a large sale and were often reprinted. Catholic contemporaries sought to defend Vetter's method of writing, among them was Duke Maximilian who defended him against the Count Palatine of Neuburg. He was highly regarded by the Dukes of Bavaria, William V and Maximilian.
