= Singen (Hohentwiel) station =

Railway station in Southern Germany

Singen (Hohentwiel)
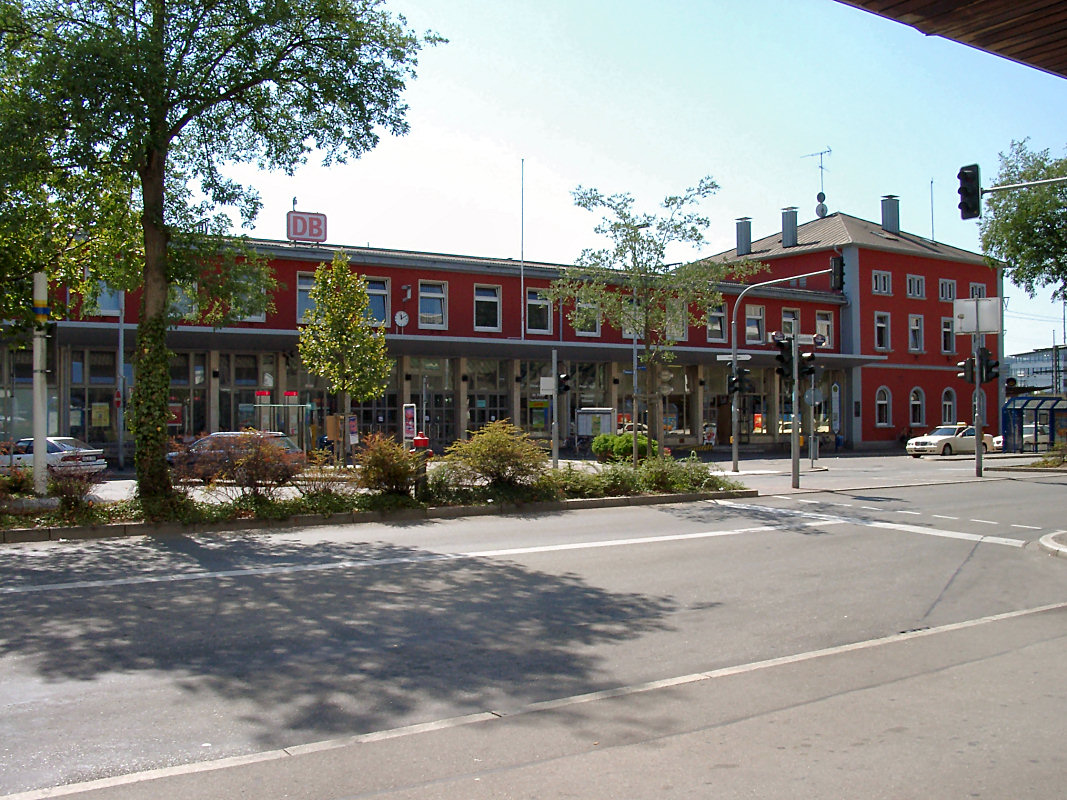
- The Station and forecourt in 2006

General information
- Other names: Singen (Hohentw), Singen (Htw)
- Location: Bahnhofstrasse 2 Singen, Baden-Württemberg; Germany
- Coordinates: 47°45′30″N 8°50′25″E
- Elevation: 434 m (1,424 ft)
- Owner: DB Netz
- Operator: DB Station&Service
- Lines: Black Forest Railway (KBS 720); High Rhine Railway (KBS 730); Plochingen–Immendingen line (KBS 740); Randenbahn (closed); Etzwilen–Singen railway (heritage railway)
- Distance: 45.1 km (28.0 mi) from Winterthur; 149.1 km (92.6 mi) from Offenburg; 384.1 km (238.7 mi) from Mannheim Hbf
- Platforms: 2 island platforms; 2 side platforms
- Tracks: 8
- Train operators: DB Fernverkehr; DB Regio Baden-Württemberg; SBB GmbH

Construction
- Accessible: Yes (4 low platforms)

Other information
- Station code: 5865
- DS100 code: RSI
- IBNR: 8000073
- Category: 2
- Fare zone: 2 (Verkehrsverbund Hegau-Bodensee)
- Website: www.bahnhof.de

History
- Opened: 1863

Services
Preceding station	DB Fernverkehr	Following station
Radolfzell towards Konstanz	IC 35 Limited service	Tuttlingen towards Emden Außenhafen or Norddeich Mole
Reverses direction	IC 87	Schaffhausen towards Zürich HB
Reverses direction	IC 87	Engen towards Stuttgart Hbf
Radolfzell towards Konstanz	IC 87	Tuttlingen towards Stuttgart Hbf
Preceding station	DB Regio Baden-Württemberg	Following station
Radolfzell towards Konstanz	RE 2	Engen towards Karlsruhe Hbf
Radolfzell towards Friedrichshafen Hafen	RE 3	Schaffhausen towards Basel Bad Bf
Radolfzell towards Konstanz	RE 4	Engen towards Stuttgart Hbf
Radolfzell towards Friedrichshafen Stadt	RB 31	Terminus
Preceding station	(Offenburg)	Following station
Terminus	RE 43	Engen towards Rottweil
Preceding station	SVG Stuttgart	Following station
Radolfzell towards Stuttgart Hbf	FEX Südbahn	Terminus
Radolfzell towards Konstanz	FEX Bodensee II	Engen towards Stuttgart Hbf
Preceding station	SBB Deutschland	Following station
Singen-Industriegebiet towards Konstanz	S6	Singen-Landesgartenschau towards Engen
Preceding station	Schaffhausen S-Bahn	Following station
Terminus	S62	Gottmadingen towards Schaffhausen
Location
- Location within Germany Location within Baden-Württemberg

Singen (Hohentwiel) station is an important regional railway junction station and interchange station in the town of Singen in the south of the German state of Baden-Württemberg. Three railways now meet there, but in the past five lines connected to it. The station is served by InterCity trains on the Stuttgart–Zurich route and several regional trains.

It is one of three railway stations in Singen, the other two being Singen-Landesgartenschau and Singen-Industriegebiet.

== Name ==
Deutsche Bahn officially call the station Singen (Hohentwiel), in reference to the Hohentwiel, the Hausberg of Singen, to distinguish it from Singen (Thür) located in Singen part of the town of Stadtilm, Thuringia. Because of its size and its significance for the district of Konstanz, the station is sometimes referred to as Singen Hauptbahnhof (lit. 'Singen mainstation') locally. In addition, the abbreviations Singen (Hohentw), Singen (Htw) and just Singen are used.

== Railway lines ==
Singen is near the starting point of the Immendingen–Horb and Horb–Stuttgart line (Gäu Railway, Gäubahn) to Stuttgart Hbf. On this line, the city is a stop for InterCity services between Stuttgart, Singen, Schaffhausen and Zurich HB. In addition, trains on the Black Forest Railway (Badische Schwarzwaldbahn), connecting Singen Offenburg and Konstanz stop in Singen. The High Rhine Railway (Hochrheinbahn) provides connections to Waldshut and Basel Bad Bf towards west and to Radolfzell and Konstanz towards east. Singen is also the terminus of the Etzwilen–Singen railway line, which is a heritage railway since 2007.

== History ==
Singen owes its development from a farming village into industrial town primarily to its role as a railway junction. The railway reached the village for the first time in 1863, when the Upper Rhine Railway was completed from Basel to Konstanz (Constance). Ten years later, the Black Forest Railway was completed from Offenburg to Konstanz, connecting with the Upper Rhine Railway in Singen. The Etzwilen–Singen railway to Switzerland completed the main lines connecting with Singen.

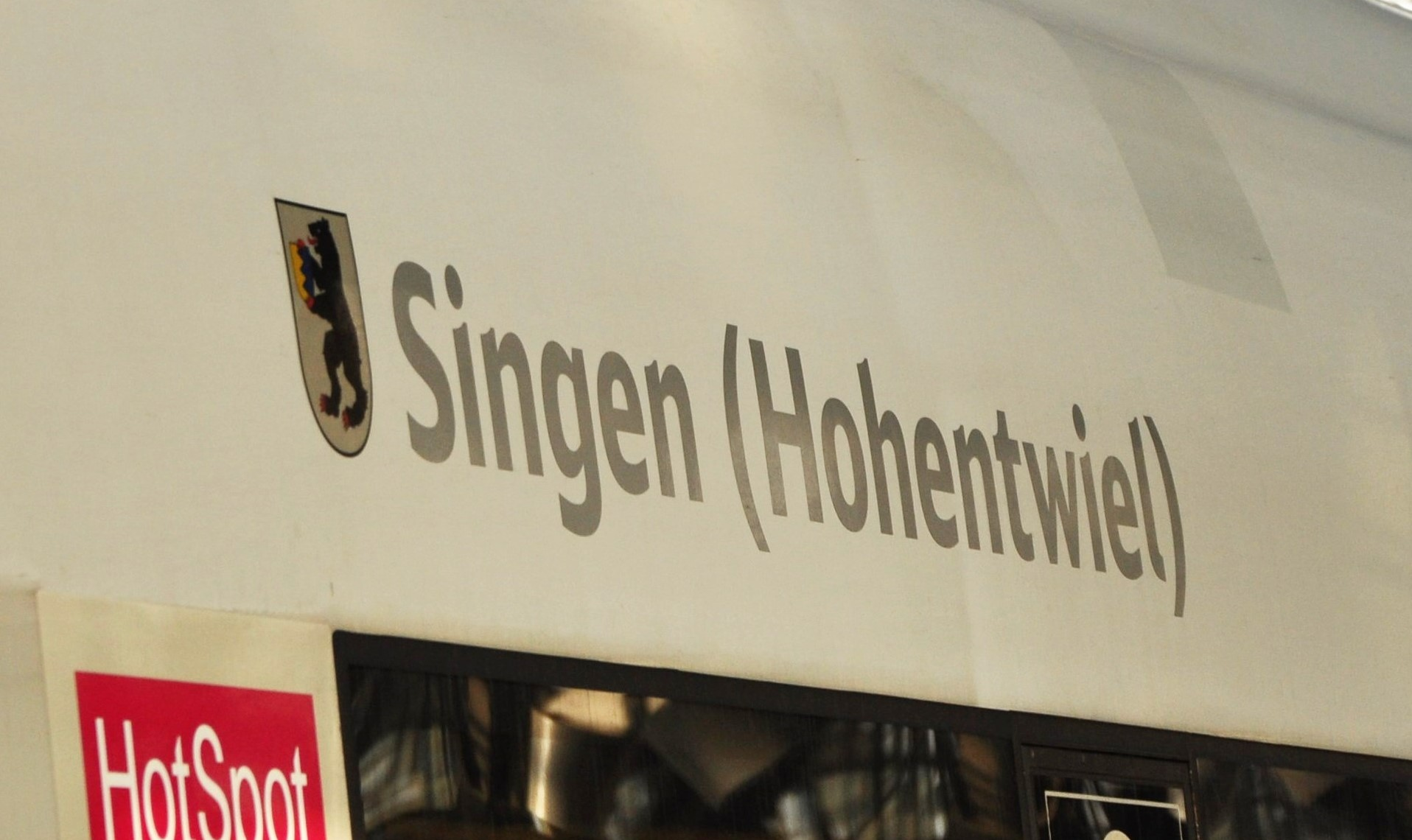
Named trainset running as ICE service

Large Swiss companies established their German branch factories in Singen, not least because of its good rail connection. The factory workers were now brought to work in Singen in great numbers by train. A local commuter railway, the Randen Railway (Randenbahn), was built in 1912, but it was closed in 1966.

The railway used to be one of the largest employers in Singen. The first station building was soon replaced by a more solid building, which still stands today with small changes. The goods yard, which formerly stood on the other side of the tracks with sidings connecting directly from the factories, soon became too small. Therefore, a new freight yard was built in 1927.

The section of the High Rhine Railway between Schaffhausen and Singen was electrified in 1989.

ICE trainsets 403 015 and 403 515 (ICE 3, class 403) were given the name of Singen (Hohentwiel) in Singen station on 7 June 2008.

== Platforms ==
Platform	Length in m	Height in cm
1	487	38
2	334	55
3	334	55
4	476	55
5	476	55
6	110	38
7	152	38
8	125	38

== Customs ==
Singen is, for customs purposes, a border station for passengers arriving from Switzerland using direct services without intermediate stops. Customs checks may be performed in the station or on board trains by German officials. Systematic passport controls were abolished when Switzerland joined the Schengen Area in 2008.

== Operations ==
Singen (Hohentwiel) has been part of the VHB (Verkehrsverbund Hegau-Bodensee, lit. 'Hegau-Bodensee Transport Association') since its inception in 1996.

=== Long-distance services ===
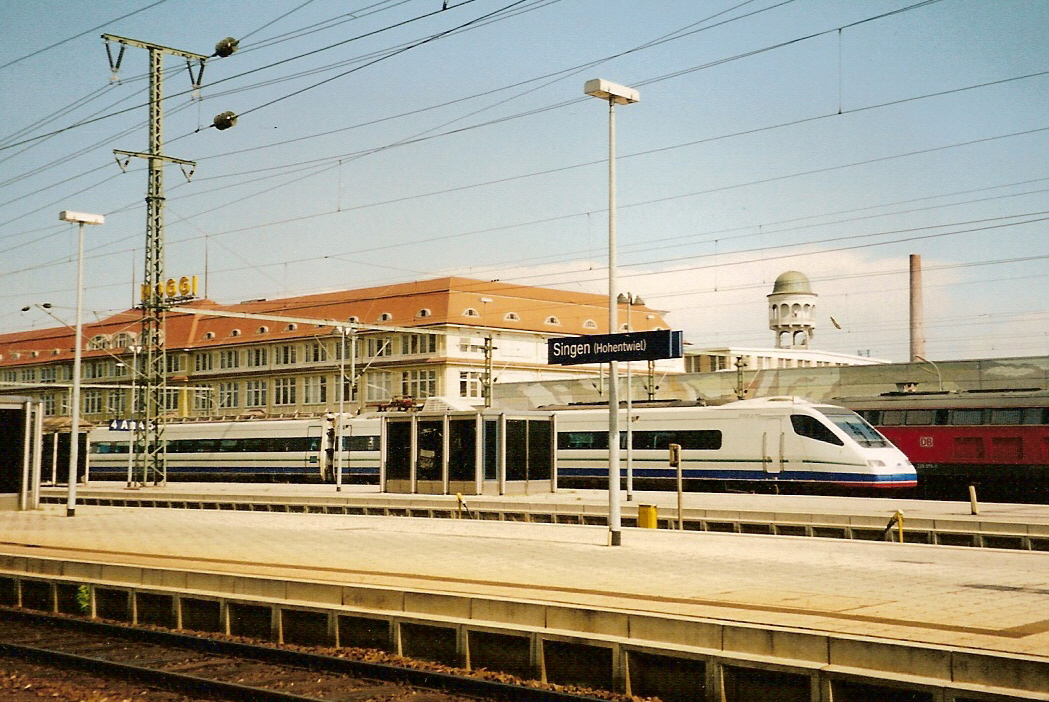
A class ETR 470 (Cisalpino) at Singen (2004)

Singen station is served by Intercity services at hourly intervals from Stuttgart via Singen and Schaffhausen to Zurich. Every two hours, it is served by Swiss Federal Railways (SBB) services hauled by Taurus locomotives of the Österreichische Bundesbahnen (ÖBB). In the other hour, it is served by Deutsche Bahn InterCity 2 services. From this there is a connection in Singen to an IC to Zurich, which also runs with SBB cars. Individual IC 2 services run from Singen to Konstanz instead of Zurich.

Furthermore, on weekends two pairs of InterCity services (IC35), operating as the Bodensee (Lake Constance), connect Konstanz with Norddeich and Emden.

A pair of IC services called Schwarzwald ("Black Forest") was operated from Hamburg to Konstanz, replacing one of the hourly cycle of regional services, until its discontinuation in December 2014 and it was then replaced by another regional train between Offenburg and Konstanz.

From 1998–2006, Singen was an intermediate stop of the former Cisalpino service between Stuttgart and Milan (Italy).

Line	Route		Frequency
IC 87 / RE 87	Stuttgart – Böblingen – Horb – Rottweil – Tuttlingen – Singen	– Konstanz	Hourly
IC 87 / RE 87	Stuttgart – Böblingen – Horb – Rottweil – Tuttlingen – Singen	– Schaffhausen – Zurich	Hourly

In addition, the Schienenverkehrsgesellschaft mbH (SVG) operates FEX services on Saturday/Sunday and during holidays.

Line	Route	Frequency	Operator
FEXSüdbahn	Singen – Radolfzell – Überlingen Therme – Friedrichshafen Stadt – Ravensburg – Aulendorf – Ulm – Plochingen – Stuttgart	limited service	SVG Stuttgart
FEXBodensee II	Stuttgart – Böblingen – Horb – Tuttlingen – Engen – Singen – Radolfzell – Konstanz	limited service	SVG Stuttgart

=== Regional services ===
In regional transport, Regional-Express (RE) and Regionalbahn (RB) services (previously also an Interregio-Express, IRE) stop at Singen, giving through connections to Karlsruhe, Stuttgart, Basel, Konstanz and Ulm via Friedrichshafen.

The station is also served by regional S-Bahn routes. The S6 of the Bodensee S-Bahn connects Singen to, among other places, Engen as well as Radolfzell, Konstanz and other municipalities on Lake Constance. This service was previously operated as the Seehas, named after a mythical "lake hare". The S62 (nicknamed Rhyhas) of Schaffhausen S-Bahn links Singen with Schaffhausen. A connecting service (S65) runs from Schaffhausen to Jestetten.

Line	Route	Frequency	Operator
RE 2	Karlsruhe – Baden-Baden – Achern – Offenburg – Villingen (Schwarzw) – Singen – Radolfzell – Konstanz	Every 60 minutes	DB Regio Baden-Württemberg
RE 3	Basel Bad Bf – Rheinfelden (Baden) – Bad Säckingen – Waldshut – Schaffhausen – Singen (– Radolfzell – Friedrichshafen Stadt – Friedrichshafen Hafen / Ulm)	Every 60/120 minutes	DB Regio Baden-Württemberg
RE 4	Stuttgart – Böblingen – Herrenberg – Eutingen im Gäu – Horb – Rottweil – Tuttlingen – Singen – Radolfzell – Konstanz	One train pair at weekends	DB Regio Baden-Württemberg
RE 43	Singen – Engen – Tuttlingen – Rottweil	Some trains	SWEG
RB 31	Singen – Radolfzell – Überlingen – Friedrichshafen Stadt	Several trains	DB Regio Baden-Württemberg
S6	Engen – Mühlhausen (b Engen) – Singen – Radolfzell – Allensbach – Konstanz	Every 30 minutes	SBB GmbH
S62	Schaffhausen – Herblingen – Thayngen – Bietingen – Gottmadingen – Singen (– Radolfzell)	Every 30 minutes	SBB GmbH

(as of 2022)

=== Defunct and heritage railway lines ===
Formerly the Randen railway (Randenbahn) ran from Singen to Beuren-Büßlingen. Most of this railway line is now dismantled.

The Etzwilen–Singen railway (Etzwilerbahn) ran via Rielasingen to Etzwilen in Switzerland. Since 2007, the latter is a heritage railway operated by heritage trains and draisines.

=== Freight traffic ===
Freight is handled at a container terminal in the industrial area, which provides connections to Italy.

== See also ==
- Rail transport in Germany
