= Radolfzell station =

Railway station in Konstanz, Germany

Radolfzell
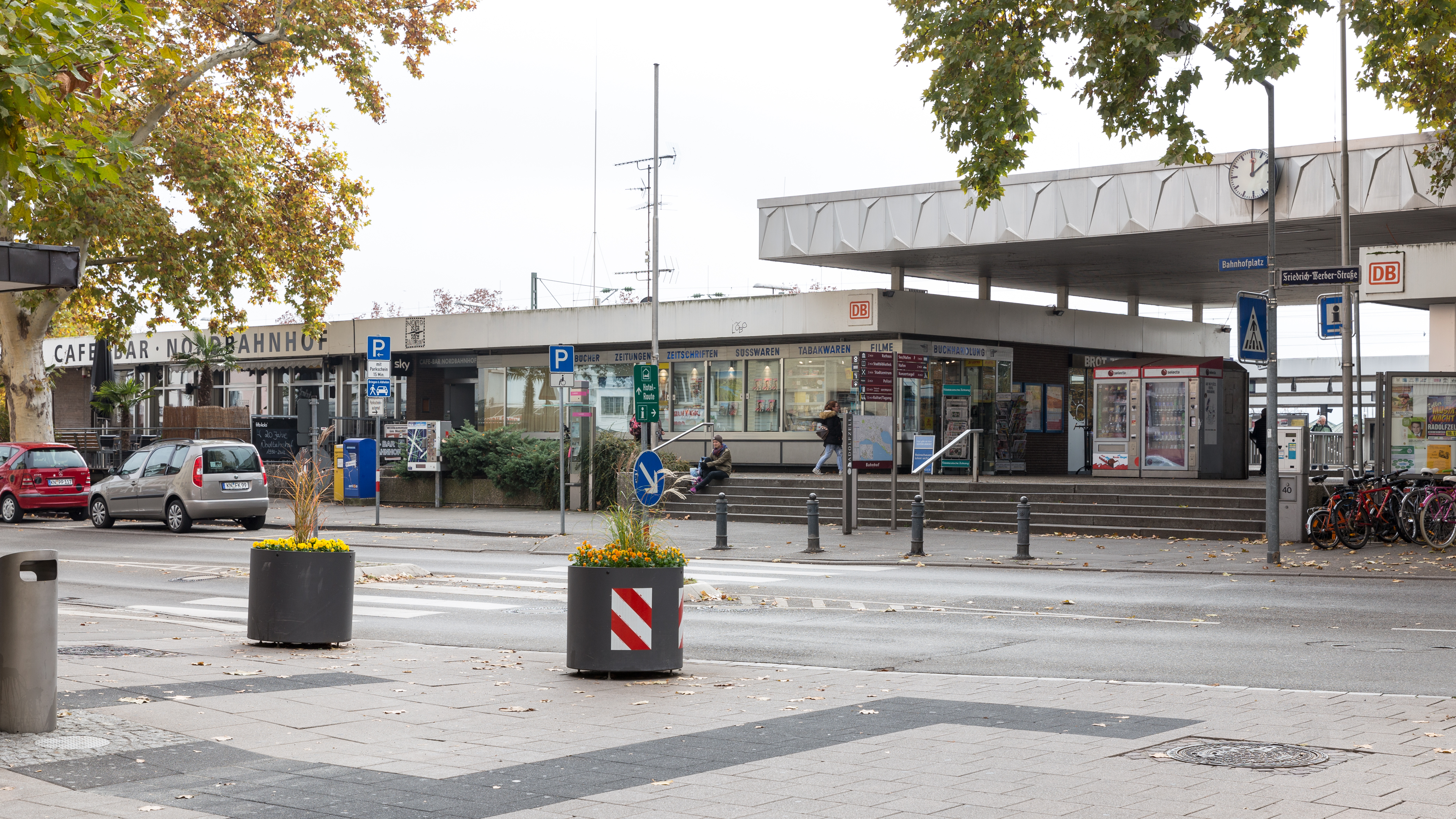
- The station in 2018

General information
- Location: Radolfzell, Baden-Württemberg; Germany
- Coordinates: 47°44′09″N 8°58′08″E
- Owner: DB Netz
- Lines: High Rhine Railway (KBS 720); Radolfzell–Mengen railway (KBS 732)
- Platforms: 2 side platform, 2 island platforms
- Tracks: 6
- Train operators: Deutsche Bahn AG; DB Regio Baden-Württemberg; SBB GmbH; SWEG
- Connections
- Ship: Bodensee-Schiffsbetriebe (BSB).

Other information
- Fare zone: 4 (Verkehrsverbund Hegau-Bodensee)

Services
Preceding station	DB Fernverkehr	Following station
Singen (Hohentwiel) towards Stuttgart Hbf	IC 87	Konstanz Terminus
Preceding station	DB Regio Baden-Württemberg	Following station
Singen (Hohentwiel) towards Basel Bad Bf	RE 3	Überlingen towards Ulm Hbf or Friedrichshafen Hafen
Singen (Hohentwiel) towards Karlsruhe Hbf	RE 2	Allensbach towards Konstanz
Singen (Hohentwiel) towards Stuttgart Hbf	RE 4	Allensbach towards Konstanz
Singen (Hohentwiel) Terminus	RB 31	Ludwigshafen (Bodensee) towards Eriskirch or Friedrichshafen Hafen
Terminus	S 61	Radolfzell Haselbrunn towards Stockach
Preceding station	SBB Deutschland	Following station
Böhringen-Rickelshausen towards Engen	S6	Markelfingen towards Konstanz
Preceding station	Schaffhausen S-Bahn	Following station
Singen (Hohentwiel) towards Schaffhausen	S62 Limited service	Terminus
Preceding station	SVG Stuttgart	Following station
Singen (Hohentwiel) Terminus	FEX Südbahn	Ludwigshafen (Bodensee) towards Stuttgart Hbf
Singen (Hohentwiel) towards Stuttgart Hbf	FEX Bodensee II	Konstanz Terminus
Location
- Location within Baden-Württemberg Location within Germany

Radolfzell station (German: Bahnhof Radolfzell) is the main railway station in the municipality of Radolfzell am Bodensee, Baden-Württemberg, Germany. It is an important junction station in the western part of Lake Constance (Bodensee). The station is located along the standard gauge High Rhine Railway line and is also the western terminus of the Radolfzell–Mengen railway line (the latter connects with the Stahringen–Friedrichshafen railway line at Stahringen). It is therefore one of the main nodal points of the Lake Constance Belt Railway (Bodensee-Gürtelbahn).

== Services ==
The station is served by IC, ICE (Hamburg-Altona–Konstanz, only on wekends), RE and regional trains (RB, S-Bahn). The Seehäsle (RB 32, Radolfzell–Stockach) was operated by HzL but is now run by SWEG as S61. The S61, S6 and RB 31 are part of Bodensee S-Bahn. In additinion, the Schienenverkehrsgesellschaft mbH (SVG) operates services between Stuttgart and Konstanz Saturday/Sunday and during holidays.

As of the December 2023 timetable change, the following services call at Radolfzell:

Line	Route		Frequency	Operator
IC 87	Konstanz – Radolfzell – Tuttlingen – Rottweil – Horb – Gäufelden – Böblingen – Stuttgart		Two train pairs	DB Fernverkehr
RE 3	Friedrichshafen Hafen –	Friedrichshafen Stadt – Radolfzell – Singen – Schaffhausen – Waldshut – Basel Bad Bf	every two hours	DB Regio Baden-Württemberg
RE 3	Ulm – Aulendorf – Ravensburg –	Friedrichshafen Stadt – Radolfzell – Singen – Schaffhausen – Waldshut – Basel Bad Bf	every two hours	DB Regio Baden-Württemberg
RE 2	Konstanz – Radolfzell – Singen – Engen – Immendingen – Donaueschingen – Villingen – Hausach – Offenburg – Achern – Bühl – Baden-Baden – Rastatt – Karlsruhe		every hour	DB Regio Baden-Württemberg
RE 4	Konstanz – Radolfzell – Singen – Engen – Tuttlingen – Rottweil – Horb – Bondorf – Herrenberg – Böblingen – Stuttgart		some trains	DB Regio Baden-Württemberg
RB 31	(Eriskirch –)	Friedrichshafen Stadt – Überlingen Therme – Radolfzell (– Singen)	every hour	DB Regio Baden-Württemberg
RB 31	(Friedrichshafen Hafen –)	Friedrichshafen Stadt – Überlingen Therme – Radolfzell (– Singen)	every hour	DB Regio Baden-Württemberg
S6 "Seehas"	Konstanz – Radolfzell – Singen – Engen		half-hourly	SBB Deutschland
S 61 "Seehäsle"	Stockach – Radolfzell		half-hourly	DB Regio Baden-Württemberg
S62 "Rhyhas"	Schaffhausen – Singen (– Radolfzell)		some trains	SBB Deutschland
FEXSüdbahn	Singen – Radolfzell – Überlingen Therme – Friedrichshafen Stadt – Ravensburg – Aulendorf – Ulm – Plochingen – Stuttgart		limited service	SVG Stuttgart
FEXBodenseeII	Stuttgart – Böblingen – Horb – Tuttlingen – Engen – Singen – Radolfzell – Konstanz		limited service	SVG Stuttgart

The railway station is adjacent to a landing stage on Untersee (Lake Constance), served by commercial passenger boats of Bodensee-Schifffahrt (BSB).

== See also ==
- Lake Constance Belt Railway
- Rail transport in Germany
