= Seehas =

Rail service in Baden-Württemberg, Germany

Seehas (S6)

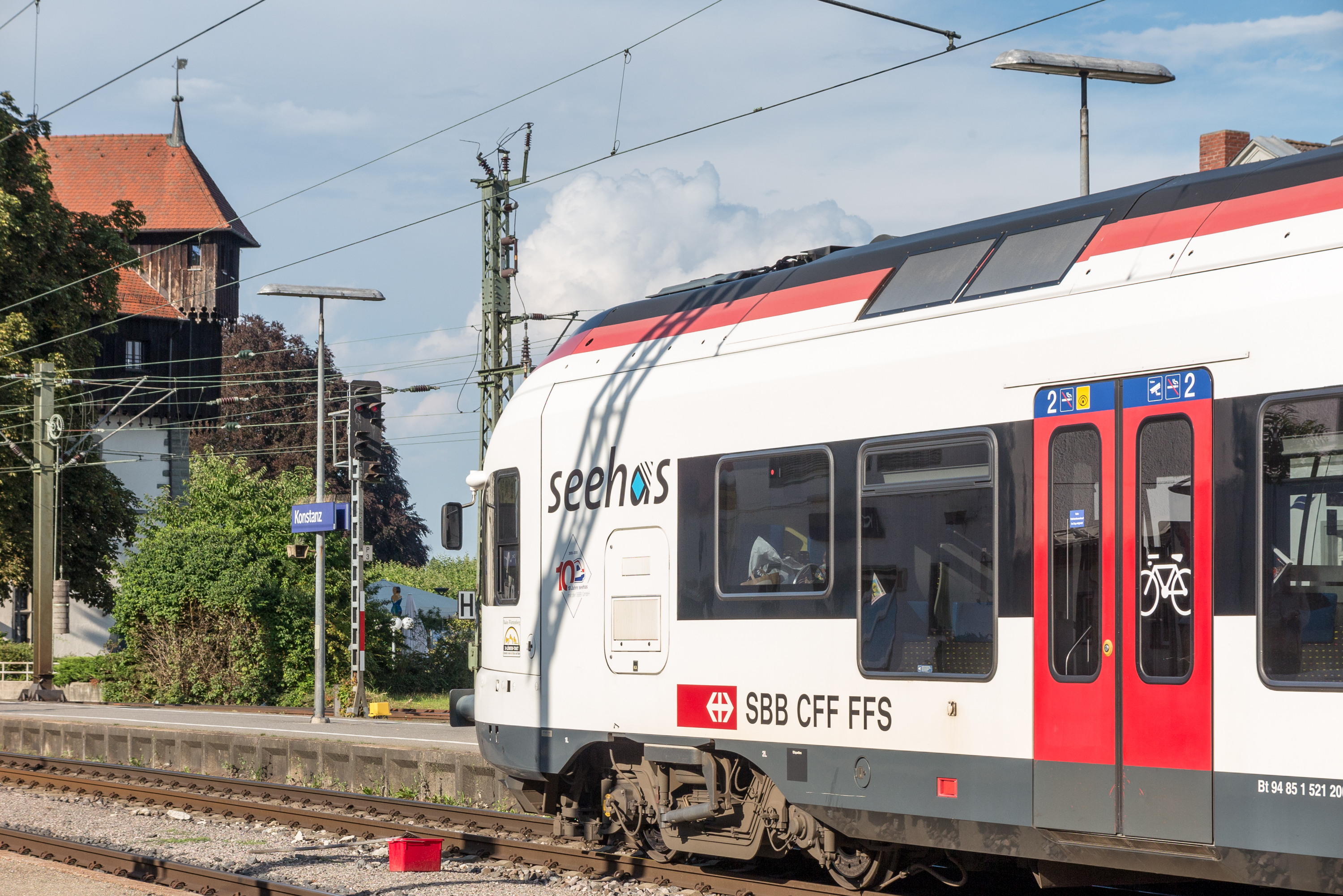

Overview
- First service: 29 May 1994
- Current operator: SBB GmbH
- Former operators: Mittelthurgaubahn (1994–2004); EuroTHURBO (2004–2005)
- Website: Seehas (in German)

Route
- Termini: Engen; Konstanz
- Stops: 16
- Distance travelled: 44 kilometres (27 mi)
- Average journey time: 50 minutes
- Service frequency: half-hourly
- Lines used: Black Forest Railway; High Rhine Railway

Technical
- Rolling stock: Stadler Rail AG FLIRT

Seehas is a named regional rail service that operates as S6 service between Engen and Konstanz in the district of Konstanz (Hegau region), in Baden-Württemberg, Germany. It is managed and operated by SBB GmbH, the German subsidiary of Swiss Federal Railways. It began operation in 1994.

== History ==
Service began on 23 May 1994, with the extension of existing services from Kreuzlingen (in Switzerland) to Engen. These were operated by Mittelthurgaubahn, a Swiss company. On Mittelthurgaubahn's bankruptcy in 2003–2004, operation passed to EuroTHURBO, the German subsidiary of Thurbo. EuroTHURBO itself merged into SBB GmbH in 2005. In 2006, SBB introduced Stadler FLIRT trains on the route and increased the service frequency to every 30 minutes. It operates as part of the Bodensee S-Bahn.

== Name ==
Seehas (Alemannic) literally means "lake hare" in English. The line got its name as a result of a public competition and the subsequent decision by a jury. The name derives from the work Ein Volksbüchlein by Ludwig Aurbacher, written in 1827, in which the Seven Swabians fight a hare. The Seehas is also a traditional mythical animal of the Lake Constance region, which is often depicted as a hybrid of a fish and a hare, for example on Kaiserbrunnen on the market place in Konstanz. In Friedrichshafen there is also the annual festival called Seehasenfest.

The Seehas also lends its name to the Seehäsle (lit. 'little lake hare'), a named train that operates as S61 between Radolfzell and Stockach. Similarly, the Rhyhas (lit. 'Rhine hare'), the S62 service of Schaffhausen S-Bahn, is named in reference to the Seehas.

== Operation ==
The service uses the Black Forest Railway from Engen to Singen (Hohentwiel), and then the High Rhine Railway to Konstanz. The length of the route is 44 kilometres (27 mi), and an average journey requires 50 minutes. The service is summarized as follows:

- S6: Engen – Mühlhausen (b Engen) – Singen (Hohentwiel) – Radolfzell – Allensbach – Konstanz

== See also ==
- List of named passenger trains of Europe
- Rail transport in Germany
