= Engen station =

Railway station in Konstanz, Germany

Engen
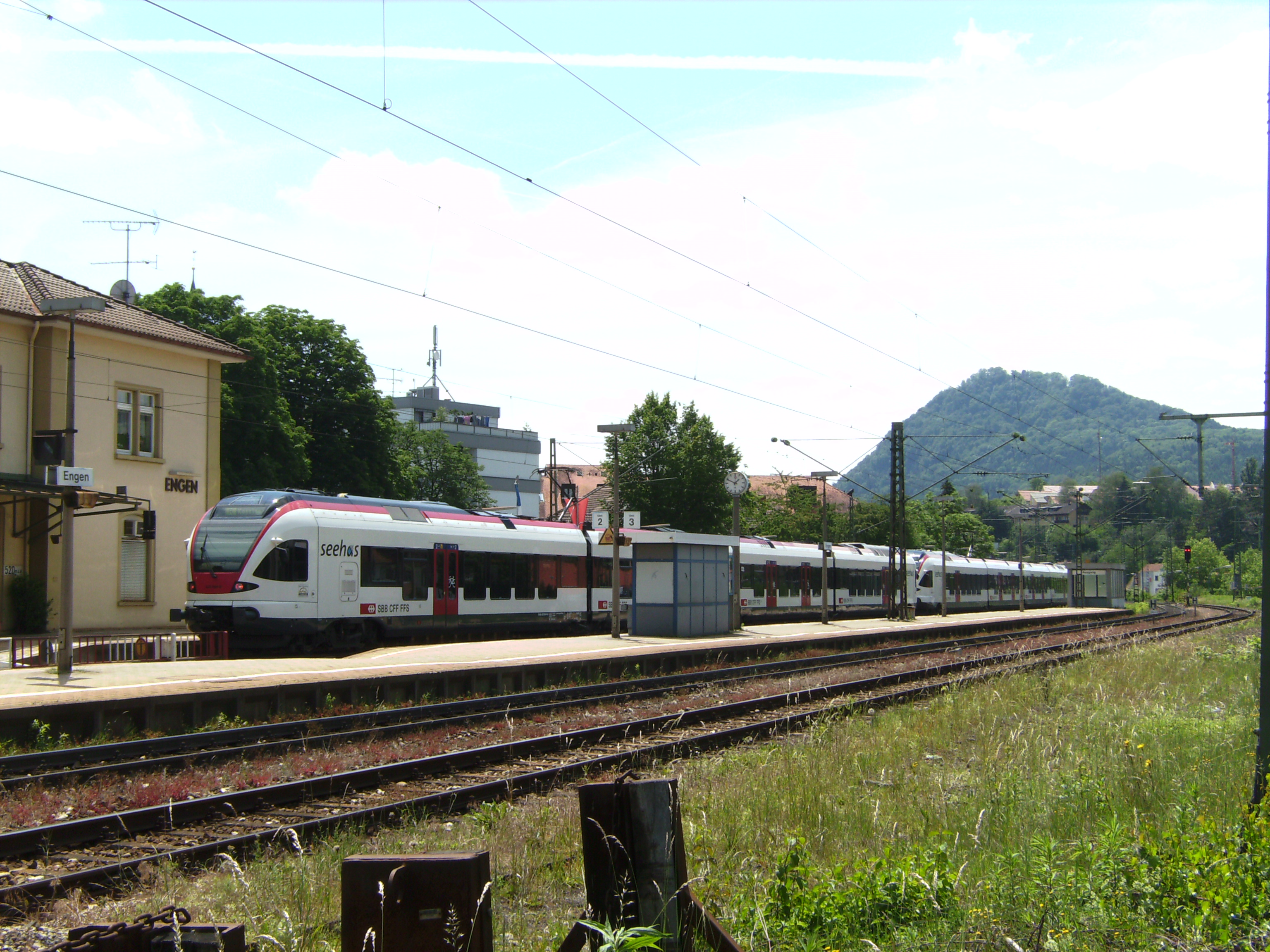
- The station in 2007 (Hohenhewen in the background)

General information
- Location: Bahnhofstraße 7; 78234 Engen; Baden-Württemberg; Germany
- Coordinates: 47.8562°N 8.7730°E
- Elevation: 520 m (1,710 ft)
- Owner: DB Netz
- Operator: DB Station&Service
- Lines: Black Forest Railway (Baden) (KBS 720)
- Platforms: 1 island platform 1 side platform
- Tracks: 4
- Train operators: DB Fernverkehr; DB Regio Baden-Württemberg; SBB Deutschland; SWEG; SVG

Other information
- Station code: 1598
- DS100 code: RENG
- IBNR: 8001790
- Category: 4
- Fare zone: VHB: 1
- Website: www.bahnhof.de

Services
| Preceding station | DB Fernverkehr | Following station |
|---|---|---|
| Tuttlingen towards Stuttgart Hbf | IC 87 | Singen (Hohentwiel) towards Zürich HB |
| Preceding station | DB Regio Baden-Württemberg | Following station |
| Immendingen towards Karlsruhe Hbf | RE 2 | Singen (Hohentwiel) towards Konstanz |
| Tuttlingen towards Singen (Hohentwiel) | RE 4 Limited service | Singen (Hohentwiel) towards Stuttgart Hbf |
| Preceding station | (Offenburg) | Following station |
| Tuttlingen towards Rottweil | RE 43 | Singen (Hohentwiel) Terminus |
| Preceding station | SBB Deutschland | Following station |
| Terminus | S6 | Welschingen-Neuhausen towards Konstanz |
| Preceding station | SVG Stuttgart | Following station |
| Tuttlingen towards Stuttgart Hbf | FEX Bodensee II | Singen (Hohentwiel) towards Konstanz |
Location
- Location within Baden-Württemberg Location within Germany

Engen station is a railway station in the municipality of Engen, located in the Konstanz district in Baden-Württemberg, Germany. It is located on the standard gauge Black Forest Railway of Deutsche Bahn.

== Services ==
As of the December 2022 timetable change, the following services stop at Engen:

- InterCity:
  - IC 87: hourly service between Stuttgart Hauptbahnhof and Zürich HB, via Schaffhausen.
- Regional-Express:
  - RE 2: hourly service between Karlsruhe Hauptbahnhof and Konstanz.
  - RE 4: one train pair at weekends between Stuttgart Hauptbahnhof and Konstanz.
  - RE 43: some trains between Rottweil and Singen (Hohentwiel).
- Bodensee S-Bahn:
  - Seehas S6: half-hourly service to Konstanz, via Singen (Hohentwiel) and Radolfzell.

In addition, the Schienenverkehrsgesellschaft mbH (SVG) operates FEX services on Saturday/Sunday and during holidays.

- FEXBodensee II: Stuttgart – Böblingen – Horb – Tuttlingen – Engen – Singen (Hohentwiel) – Radolfzell – Konstanz

== See also ==
- Bodensee S-Bahn
- Rail transport in Germany
