= Konstanz station =

Railway station in Konstanz, Germany

Konstanz
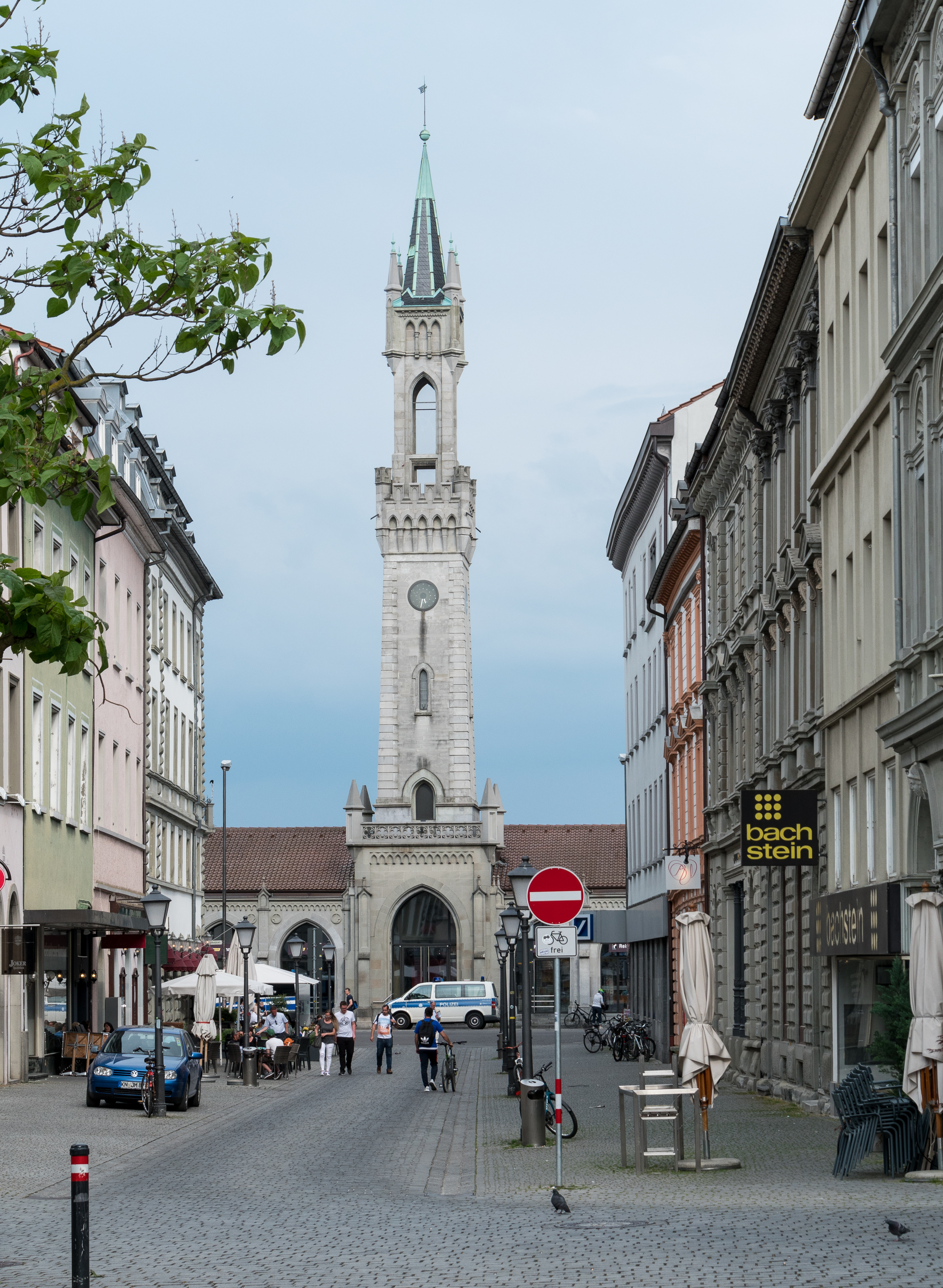
- Entrance building from the street

General information
- Location: Bahnhofsplatz 43; Konstanz, Baden-Württemberg; Germany
- Coordinates: 47°39′32″N 9°10′38″E
- Owner: DB Netz
- Operator: DB Station&Service
- Lines: High Rhine Railway (KBS 730); Lake Line; Wil–Kreuzlingen line
- Platforms: 1 island platform; 1 side platform
- Tracks: 3
- Train operators: DB Regio Baden-Württemberg; SBB GmbH; Swiss Federal Railways; Thurbo
- Connections
- Ship: Catamaran cruises; URh passenger ships
- Bus: Stadtbus Konstanz

Construction
- Accessible: Yes
- Architect: H. Leonhardt
- Architectural style: Gothic and Renaissance

Other information
- Station code: 3363
- DS100 code: RKO
- IBNR: 8003400
- Category: 3
- Fare zone: 5 (VHB); 256 (Tarifverbund Ostwind)
- Website: www.bahnhof.de

History
- Opened: 1863
Services
Preceding station	DB Fernverkehr	Following station
Radolfzell towards Hamburg-Altona	ICE 26	Terminus
Radolfzell towards Stuttgart Hbf	IC 87	Terminus
Preceding station	DB Regio Baden-Württemberg	Following station
Konstanz-Petershausen towards Karlsruhe Hbf	RE 2	Terminus
Preceding station	SBB CFF FFS	Following station
Terminus	IR 75	Kreuzlingen towards Lucerne
Preceding station	St. Gallen S-Bahn	Following station
Terminus	S14	Kreuzlingen towards Weinfelden
Terminus	S44	Kreuzlingen towards Weinfelden
Terminus	SN14 Limited service	Kreuzlingen towards Weinfelden
Preceding station	Thurbo	Following station
Terminus	RE1	Kreuzlingen Hafen towards Herisau
Preceding station	SBB Deutschland	Following station
Konstanz-Petershausen towards Engen	S6	Terminus
Preceding station	SVG Stuttgart	Following station
Radolfzell towards Stuttgart Hbf	FEX Bodensee II	Terminus
Location
- Location within Germany Location within Baden-Württemberg

Konstanz station (German: Bahnhof Konstanz) is the largest passenger station in the German city of Konstanz (Constance). It is served by regional and long-distance services operated by Deutsche Bahn and Swiss Federal Railways. It is the end of the High Rhine Railway and the beginning of the Lake Line.

== History ==
The station was opened to traffic 15 June 1863 with the opening of the last section of the Upper Rhine Railway between Waldshut and Konstanz by the Grand Duchy of Baden State Railway. The link to Switzerland was opened in 1871, when the Swiss Northeastern Railway (German: Schweizerische Nordostbahn, NOB) opened the line between Romanshorn and Konstanz, now part of the Seelinie (lit. 'Lake Line'). On 17 July 1875 this was followed by the building of the Etzwilen–Konstanz line, together with the Kreuzlingen–Kreuzlingen harbour connecting line, by the Swiss National Railway (Schweizerische Nationalbahn, SNB). After the SNB went bankrupt in 1878, its tracks were taken over by the NOB. In 1902, the NOB was absorbed in the newly created SBB.

In 1911, the Mittelthurgau-Bahn (MThB) opened a line from Kreuzlingen via Berg and Weinfelden to Wil. From the beginning, services from Kreuzlingen ran on the former SBB line through Konstanz to connect with the German rail network. It was served by the S-Bahn-like Seehas (named after a mythical "lake hare") service developed by the MThB over the Upper Rhine Railway to Engen. In 2002, the MThB fell into financial difficulties and was subsequently liquidated. Since then, subsidiaries of SBB have operated its services: SBB GmbH between Konstanz and Engen and Thurbo between Konstanz and Weinfelden/Wil.

== Architecture ==
The station is located on the shore. The station building was built in 1863 in Gothic and Renaissance styles, modelled on the Palazzo Vecchio in Florence. North of the entrance building was the Fürstenbahnhof ("princes’ station building"), a pavilion, which now serves as a shopping centre.

The station has three tracks: a “home” platform (next to the entrance building) and a central island platform. To reach the central platform, tracks 2 and 1 must be crossed on the level. This crossing is protected by a barrier. At the northern end, there is also a tunnel that connects the platforms on one side to the city centre and on the other side to the port. In addition, there are two walkways and a shopping centre leading to the lake.

=== Structural condition ===
In the past, Konstanz had a reputation as a "grubby" station, as it was rundown and inefficient. The last major work on the station had been the renovation of the bell tower carried out between 1975 and 1983. As part of the economic stimulus program the entrance building is being rehabilitated with energy-saving measures. The waiting area is also being made more attractive.

=== Border station ===
Konstanz has the function of a border station. Before November 2008, when Switzerland became a party to the Schengen Agreement, the central platform was separated by a chain-link fence. Long-distance trains to and from Switzerland stopped on platform 3. The station building also has two sections for the German and Swiss railways. The German part is still operated by Deutsche Bahn and the Swiss part by Thurbo (formerly Mittelthurgaubahn). Until 2008 travellers to the Swiss section of the station had to pass through a form of passport control to get to the platforms. The station remains a customs border and as such customs checks are still possible by the authorities of both countries.

== Traffic ==
=== Long-distance ===
==== Deutsche Bahn ====
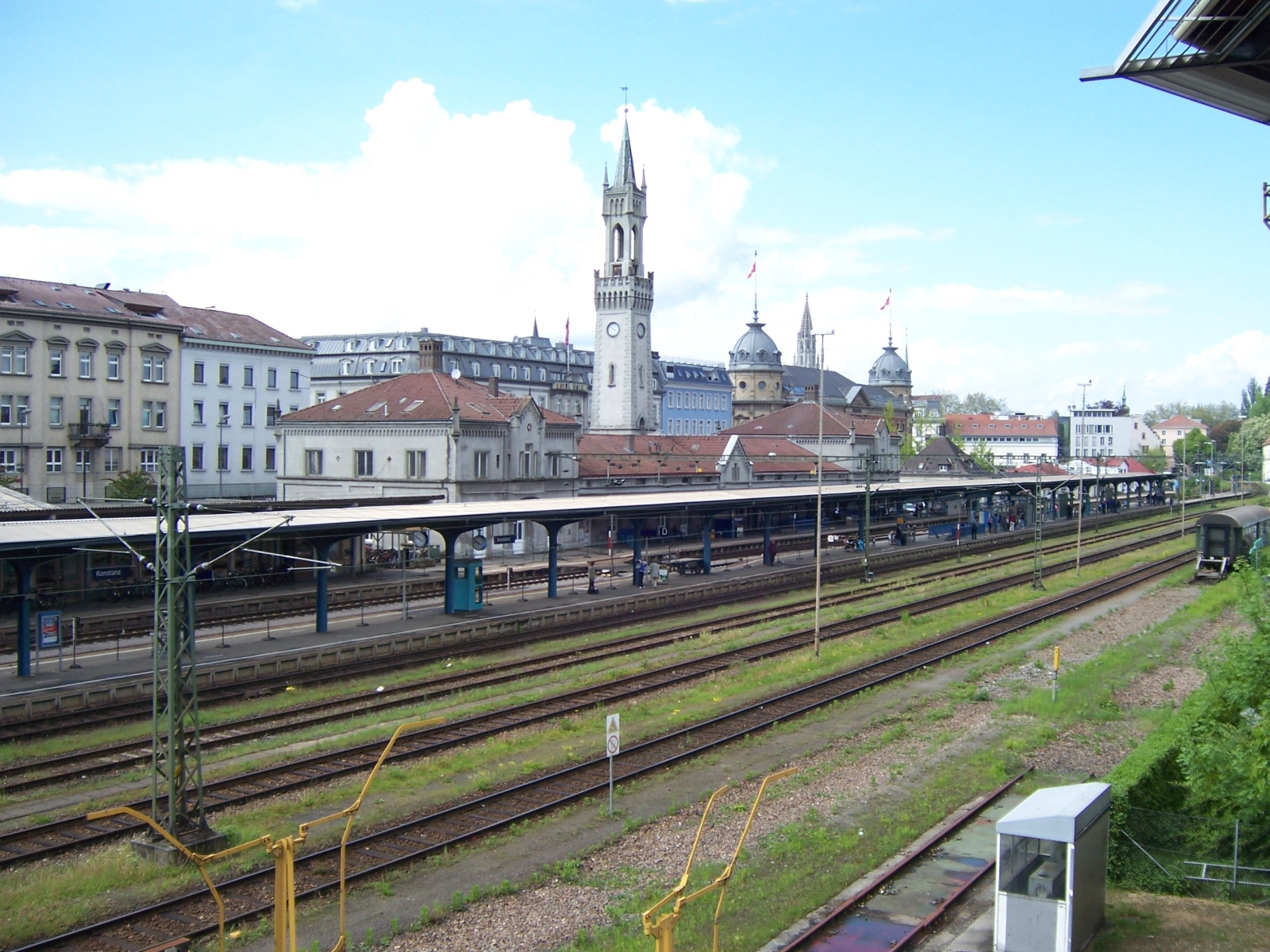
Looking over the tracks to the north

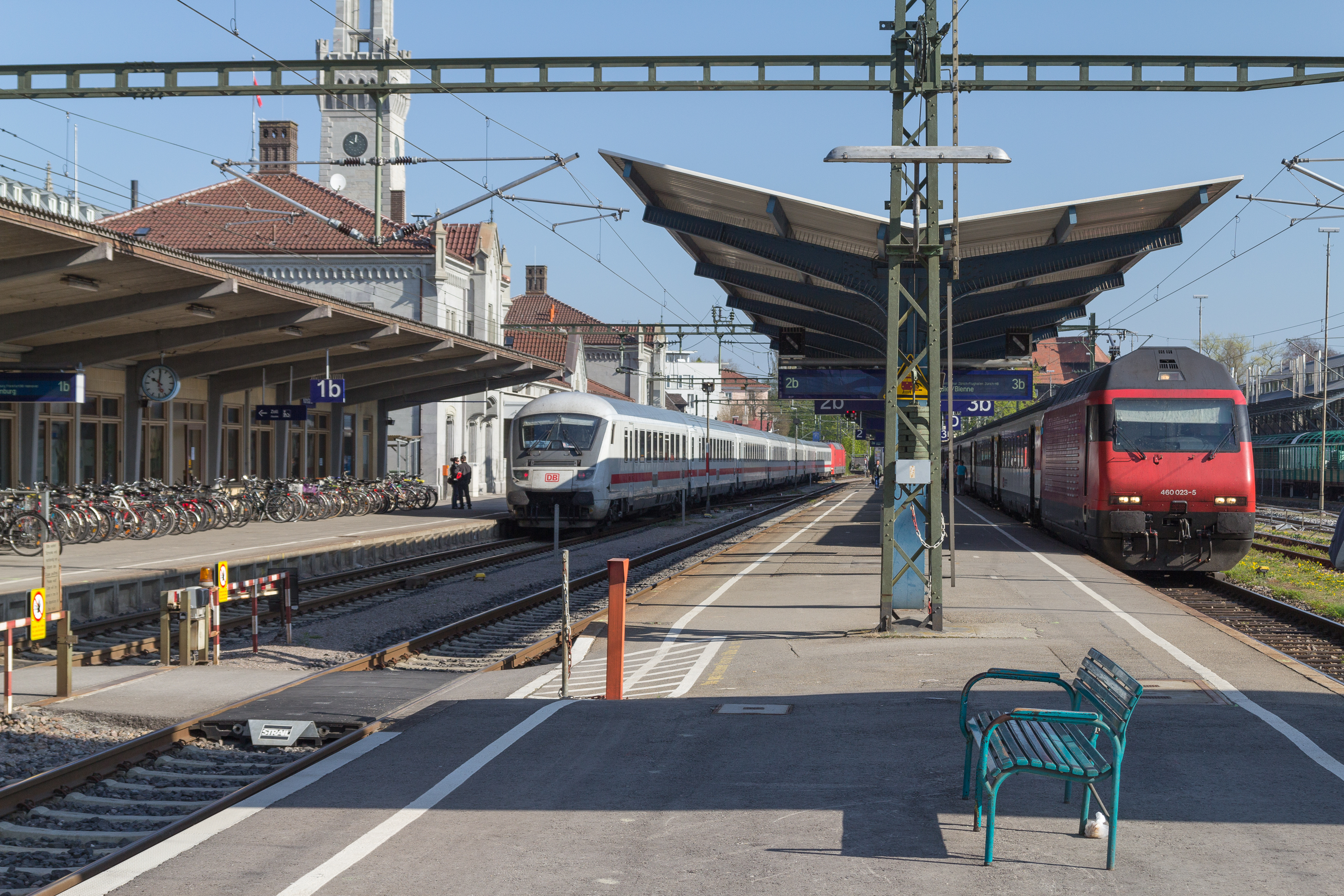
Konstanz Railway Station with DB- and SBB trains

Deutsche Bahn operates only a few long-distance trains from Konstanz. A daily InterCity train running to/from Hamburg, extended in the summer months to/from Stralsund, was discontinued in December 2014. Since then, there is only one InterCity runs from Emden via Cologne: Friday and Saturday to Constance, Saturday and Sunday in the opposite direction.

Line	Route	Frequency
ICE 26	Hamburg-Altona – Lüneburg – Hanover – Göttingen – Gießen – Frankfurt (Main) Hauptbahnhof – Offenburg – Villingen (Schwarzw) - Singen(Hohentwiel) – Radolfzell – Konstanz	Some trains on the weekend in the Summer
IC 87	Stuttgart – Böblingen – Herrenberg – Horb – Rottweil – Tuttlingen – Singen – Radolfzell – Konstanz	Two train pairs

==== SBB ====
Swiss Federal Railways (SBB) InterRegio trains run hourly from Lucerne to Konstanz:

- Lucerne – Zug – Zürich HB – Zürich Airport – Winterthur – Frauenfeld – Weinfelden – Kreuzlingen – Konstanz

==== SVG ====
The Schienenverkehrsgesellschaft mbH (SVG) operates additional services between Stuttgart and Konstanz Saturday/Sunday and during holidays.

- FEXBodensee II: Stuttgart – Böblingen – Horb – Tuttlingen – Engen – Singen (Hohentwiel) – Radolfzell – Konstanz

=== Regional transport ===
==== Deutsche Bahn ====
Konstanz is served hourly by Regional-Express (RE) trains on the Black Forest Railway. Until the timetable change in 2015, Interregio-Express and RE trains alternated from Kreuzlingen or Konstanz to Karlsruhe. This was changed with the timetable change, so that there is now a continuous RE hourly to Karlsruhe.

- RE 2 Karlsruhe – Baden-Baden – Offenburg – Villingen – Donaueschingen – Singen – Konstanz

==== SBB ====
The Swiss Federal Railways (SBB) and its subsidiary SBB GmbH, which has its head office in Konstanz, serves Konstanz with the named train Seehas, a regional service operating every half hour. Its subsidiary Thurbo connects Konstanz and Kreuzlingen every half hour with the St. Gallen S-Bahn S14 service, which calls at every station upon request, and the S44, which does not call at stations between Kreuzlingen and Weinfelden. These regional services form part of a wider network around Lake Constance, marketed as the Bodensee S-Bahn, spreading over four countries (Germany, Switzerland, Austria, Liechtenstein).

- S6: Konstanz – Radolfzell – Singen – Engen (Seehas; SBB GmbH)
- S14: Konstanz – Kreuzlingen – Berg – Weinfelden (Thurbo)
- S44: Konstanz – Kreuzlingen – Weinfelden (Thurbo)
- RE1: Konstanz – Kreuzlingen Hafen – Romanshorn – St. Gallen – Herisau (Thurbo)

The RegioExpress (RE1) from Konstanz via St. Gallen to Herisau with stops in Kreuzlingen Hafen and Romanshorn was introduced in December 2015 after lengthy negotiations. At first there are five trains per day and direction. The project almost failed for lack of funding, although the Kreuzlingen/Konstanz-Romanshorn-St. Gallen railway line has been comprehensively refurbished in recent years for this express service. GTW sets of Stadler Rail operated by THURBO are used. The same trainsets are used for RE1 and the S14, meaning that passengers do not have to change trains in Konstanz.

During weekends, the station is served by a nighttime S-Bahn service (SN14), offered by Ostwind fare network, and operated by Thurbo for St. Gallen S-Bahn.

- St. Gallen S-Bahn SN14: hourly service to Weinfelden, via Kreuzlingen.

==== Other public transport ====
The bus stop in front of the station is served by city bus lines 1, 2, 3, 6, 908, 9A/B, 12, 4/13, 13/4 and 14. The nearby Marktstätte bus stop is served by lines 5, 6 and 908 (towards Landschlacht). Regional bus services are operated by the express buses of the RAB to Ravensburg and Friedrichshafen. Some buses of the SBG operate to Allensbach and Radolfzell.

Catamaran services also run every hour to Friedrichshafen from the port near the station. URh Navigation Company offers boat trips to Kreuzlingen and Stein am Rhein/Schaffhausen via the Untersee and High Rhine.

== See also ==
- Rail transport in Germany
