= Engen, Germany =

Engen
- Town
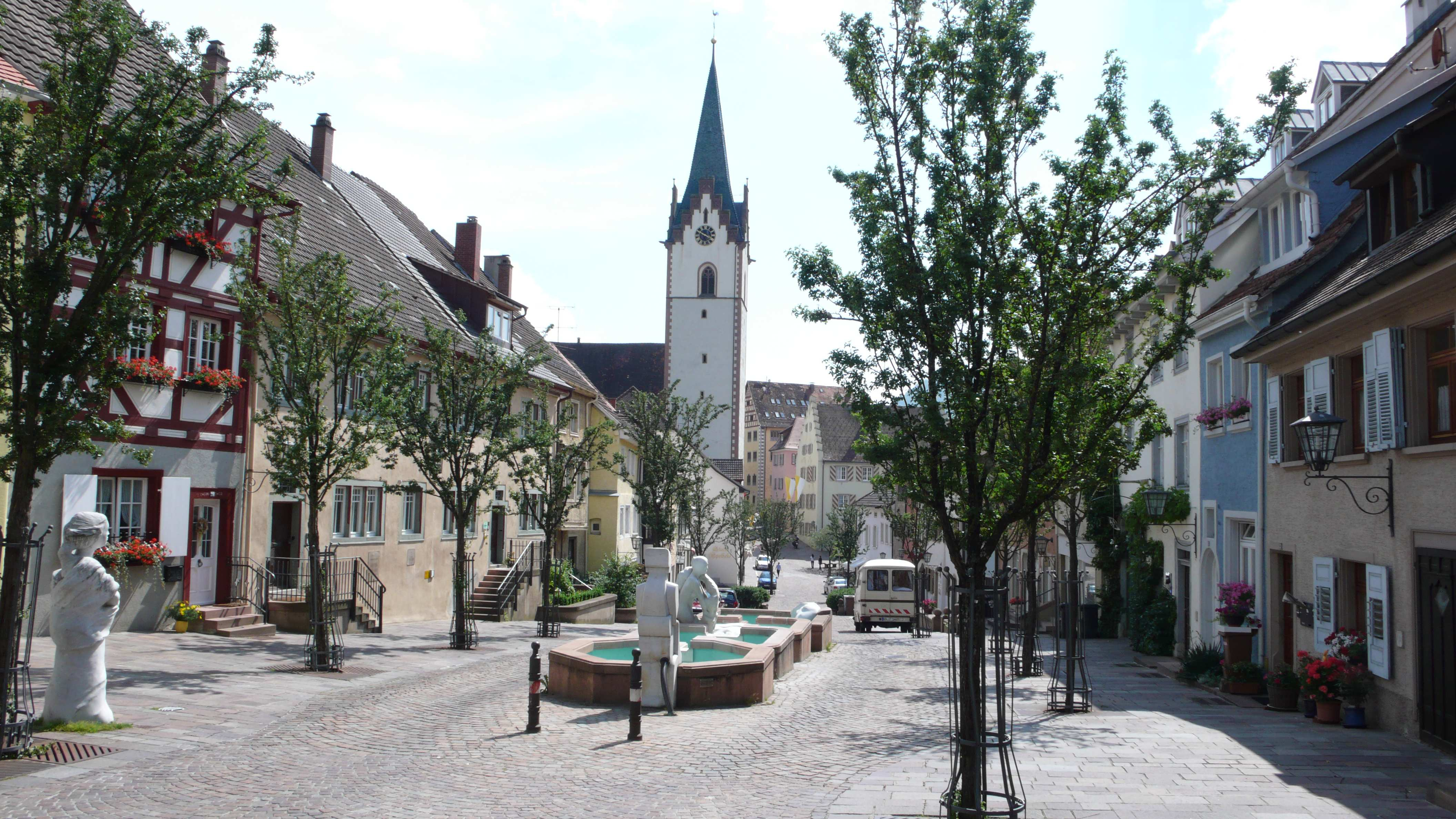

- Coat of arms

- Location of Engen within Konstanz district
- Interactive map of Engen
- Location within Germany Location within Baden-Württemberg
- Coordinates: 47°51′10″N 08°46′17″E
- Country: Germany
- State: Baden-Württemberg
- Admin. region: Freiburg
- District: Konstanz

Government
  - Mayor (2023–31): Frank Harsch (CDU)

Area
  - Total: 70.56 km^{2} (27.24 sq mi)
- Elevation: 531 m (1,742 ft)

Population (2025-12-31)
  - Total: 11,351
  - Density: 160.9/km^{2} (416.7/sq mi)
- Time zone: UTC+01:00 (CET)
  - Summer (DST): UTC+02:00 (CEST)
- Postal codes: 78234
- Dialling codes: 07733
- Vehicle registration: KN
- Website: www.engen.de

Engen (German pronunciation: [ˈɛŋən]) is a town in the district of Konstanz, in Baden-Württemberg, Germany. It is situated 12 km northwest of Singen, and 15 km south of Tuttlingen.

== City structure ==
Coat of arms	City district	Inhabitants (date: 2007)	Area (date: 27. May 1970)
Engen	Engen (city centre)	6.028	1382 ha
Anselfingen	Anselfingen	898	837 ha
Bargen	Bargen	253	700 ha
Biesendorf	Biesendorf	163	569 ha
Bittelbrunn	Bittelbrunn	323	825 ha
Neuhausen	Neuhausen	586	485 ha
Stetten	Stetten	244	533 ha
Welschingen	Welschingen	1.445	981 ha
Zimmerholz	Zimmerholz	332	741 ha

== History ==
Engen has been proved by documentary evidence in the 11th century for the first time, where it belonged to the Baron of Höwen (also Hewen). In the city area of Engen, there has been a medieval castle, the Burg Neuhausen, remaining unlocated however. In the 13th century, Engen received the city charter.

From 1639, the city belonged to the Count of Fürstenberg, and thus to the Principality of Fürstenberg. In 1640, the area was devastated by Swedes and French in the context of the Thirty Years' War.

During the War of the Second Coalition, on May 3, 1800, a battle between the Austrians, led by Paul Kray, and the French, commanded by Jean Victor Marie Moreau, took place, resulting in a retreat of the Austrian troops.

In 1806, Engen went to Grand Duchy of Baden. The city became a district authority in 1846, which however, has been centralized to the district authority of Konstanz in 1936.

=== Incorporations ===
As a consequence of the statewide local government restructuring reforms in Baden-Württemberg during the early 1970s, the following hitherto independent municipalities have been incorporated into Engen:

- 1971, July 1: Bargen
- 1971, December, 1st: Biesendorf and Bittelbrunn
- 1975, January 1: Anselfingen, Neuhausen, Stetten, Welschingen, Zimmerholz

== Demographics ==
In January 2014, the official census reported a total population of 10,324 in the municipal area. Subsequently, Mayor Johannes Moser declared a long-term increase of inhabitants while other smaller municipalities in the direct vicinity had to suffer a demographic decline.

=== Religion ===
Engen is the seat of the deanship Hegau of the Roman Catholic Archdiocese of Freiburg. A vast majority of the inhabitants are of Roman Catholic confession, which is reflected in many Roman Catholic churches in every city district. However, Protestants can attend masses in their own church in the city centre. Like everywhere in Europe, nowadays, Muslim immigrants from Balkan, Arabian and African countries add a further more or less larger confession group to the municipality.

== Government ==
As a consequence of the local elections from May, 25th 2014 with a turnout of 49,1% (2009: 46,8%), the municipal council (18 seats in total) is made up as follows:

Free voters	54,19 %	: 10 seats
CDU	45,81 %	: 8 seats

Regarding electoral voting behaviour, Engen and particularly its city districts can be described as rather Christian democratic/conservative which is reflected in a share of 45–55% where the CDU gains votes above the nationwide average, proving to be similar to election results in Baden-Württemberg though. Following the state elections in 2016, the Greens significantly increased their support analogous to the state-wide trends and results.

=== Finances ===
The city of Engen proves to have a responsible governmental management in financial matters which is reflected in the fact of being free of debt since 1995. Moreover, the local budget shows to have a reserve above the average representing one of the few German municipalities being in a comfortable financial position.

== Coat of arms ==
Blazon: "A silvery five pointed star"

== Town twinning ==
- Pannonhalma, (Hungary), since 1998
- Trilport, (Département Seine-et-Marne in France), since 2000
- Moneglia, (close to Genoa, Liguria in Italy), since 2009

== Culture and constructions ==
Engen is situated on the holiday road Römerstraße Neckar-Alb-Aare and the Freiburg-Lake Constance Black Forest Trail, a long-distance footpath. In the city area, there is the Old city park with the war memorial as well as the new city park with a little lake.

=== Museums ===
- The Municipal Museum Engen + gallery possesses an archaeological collection, sacral and modern art as well as historic-cultural exhibitions.
- The Ice Age park Engen, finished in spring 2003, is a reconstruction of a Stone Age camp, next to the Petersfels in the „Brudertal“. In order to visit the three-hectare large area, a walk can be done by a 1.5 hour walk.

=== Places of interest ===
Engen possesses a renovated Old town. In that respect, worth seeing is the Catholic town church Mariä Himmelfahrt dating back to the 13th century (originally late Romanesque art, then modifications took place in Gothic art, which ended in Baroque). Close to the church, several graves memorials can be found, amongst them, the Count of Lupfen and family members of the aristocratic Pappenheimer. Beside of the palace Krenkinger Schloss in the city centre, the Municipal Museum Engen with gallery can be visited in walking distance from there. The museum used to be a Dominican nunnery from 1333 to 1803 being called Nunnery St. Wolfgang. Today, there are several exhibitions of Palaeolithic and Mesolithic times from the Brudertal (trans.: brother valley), like for instance, the Venus of Engen. Regularly art exhibitions take place, which cause supraregional interest quite often. In the area of the market square, extensive façades in the Trompe-l'œil style are conspicuous. Dispersed over the entire Old town, fountains made by artists of different styles can be found whilst being designed with various artist statements. Along a marked and signposted walking path, visitors can go from fountain to fountain while looking at the attractive Old town.

Originally, the palace Krenkinger Schloss probably was a building dating back to Staufer times and has been constructed around the 13th century. After the large brand in 1640 and renovations in 1892/93 in order to obtain space for the office of the district authority of Baden, the construction has been altered strongly.

=== Regular events ===
The Narrenzunft Engen runs the traditional local and native Swabian–Alemannic Fastnacht. The local carnival figure Hansele can be traced back historically, which oldest preserved costume dates back to the year 1850.

Moreover, the traditional Old Town festival (Altstadtfest) regularly takes place in July. This local highlight usually attracts thousands of guests and visitors. In the centre of the event, one can find a jumble sale, a cabaret, music and dance into the night. In particular in the evening, every taste of music can be satisfied when listing to concerts of regional bands on an open-air theatre behind the town hall.

== Economy and Infrastructure ==
=== Economy ===
From 1970, a variety of medium-sized companies established in Engen. For this purpose, the city provided a larger industrial area, the so-called Industriegebiet Grub. Newer positive economic developments show the necessity of an extension of the former area and its realization while and a new industrial region has been created in the smaller city district Welschingen as well.

Today, there are about 600 business enterprises and ca. 2500 employees liable to pay compulsory insurance in Engen.

=== Traffic and transport ===
The station of Engen is well connected by both, the line towards Stuttgart and the Black Forest Railway (Offenburg-Konstanz). Furthermore, the suburban train Seehas connects the town with other lake-adjacent cities like Singen, Radolfzell and Konstanz at half-hourly intervals. Other connections, in particular to the state capital Stuttgart, and/or to Karlsruhe with the Black Forest Railway (Baden), are available by the Regional-Express at two-hour intervals. Engen is part of the Transport Association Hegau-Bodensee.

The motorway Bundesautobahn 81 (Würzburg–Stuttgart–Singen) and the federal highway Bundesstraße 31 (Breisach–Lindau) as well as the Bundesstraße 491 (in the direction of Tuttlingen) connect Engen with the interstate road network.

The nearest airports to Engen are Zurich Airport, located 82 km (51 mi) south, EuroAirport Basel Mulhouse Freiburg, located 126 km (78 mi) south west, and Stuttgart Airport, located 139 km (86 mi) north east of the town.

=== Education ===
In 2006/07, the newly founded Gymnasium Engen started with three class sizes of fifth grade. Furthermore, the training centre of the town centre contains the Anne Frank-Realschule, a Werkrealschule and a Förderschule ("Hewenschule"). Additionally, there are two primary schools in Engen and Welschingen. The municipality has also seven kindergarten at its disposal. Moreover, a youth seminar can be found in the town district Anselfingen.

== Notable people and honorary citizens ==
=== Notable people ===
- Conrad Vetter (1547–1622), Jesuit preacher and polemical writer.
- Hubert Dilger (1836–1911), a German American who became a decorated artillerist in the Union Army
- Hermann Graf (1912–1988), Luftwaffe WW II fighter ace.
- Oliver Sorg (born 1990), footballer who has played over 280 games and one for Germany
- Timo Benitz (born 1991), middle-distance runner, mainly in the 1500 metres.

=== Honorary citizens ===
- 1862, September 7, (in Oensbach), Josef Weber, died January, 13th, 1937, town priest and dean, 1920 honorary citizen of Engen
- 1882, March 13, (in Pforzheim), Viktor Kolb, died 1963, tailor, co-founder of the medical convoy (German Red Cross) in Engen, 1953 honorary citizen
- 1883 (in Welschingen), prelate Prof. Dr. theol. Alfred Wikenhauser, died 1960 honorary citizen of Welschingen
- 1884 (in Stockach), Emil Dreher, died 1974, town priest and dean, 1948 honorary citizen of Engen
- 1890, January 5, (in Oberndorf), Mathilde Nied (Sister Lukana), devoted occupation in the hospital Engen, 1962 honorary citizen of Engen
- 1911, May 5, (in Freiburg), Dr. Hans Ludwig Steffen, died June 1, 1994 (in Engen), head doctor of the hospital Engen, 1976 honorary citizen of Engen
- 1912, October 12, Hermann Graf, died November 4, 1988, in Rastatt, fighter pilot and recipient of the Knight's Cross, 1942 honorary citizen of Engen

== Gallery ==
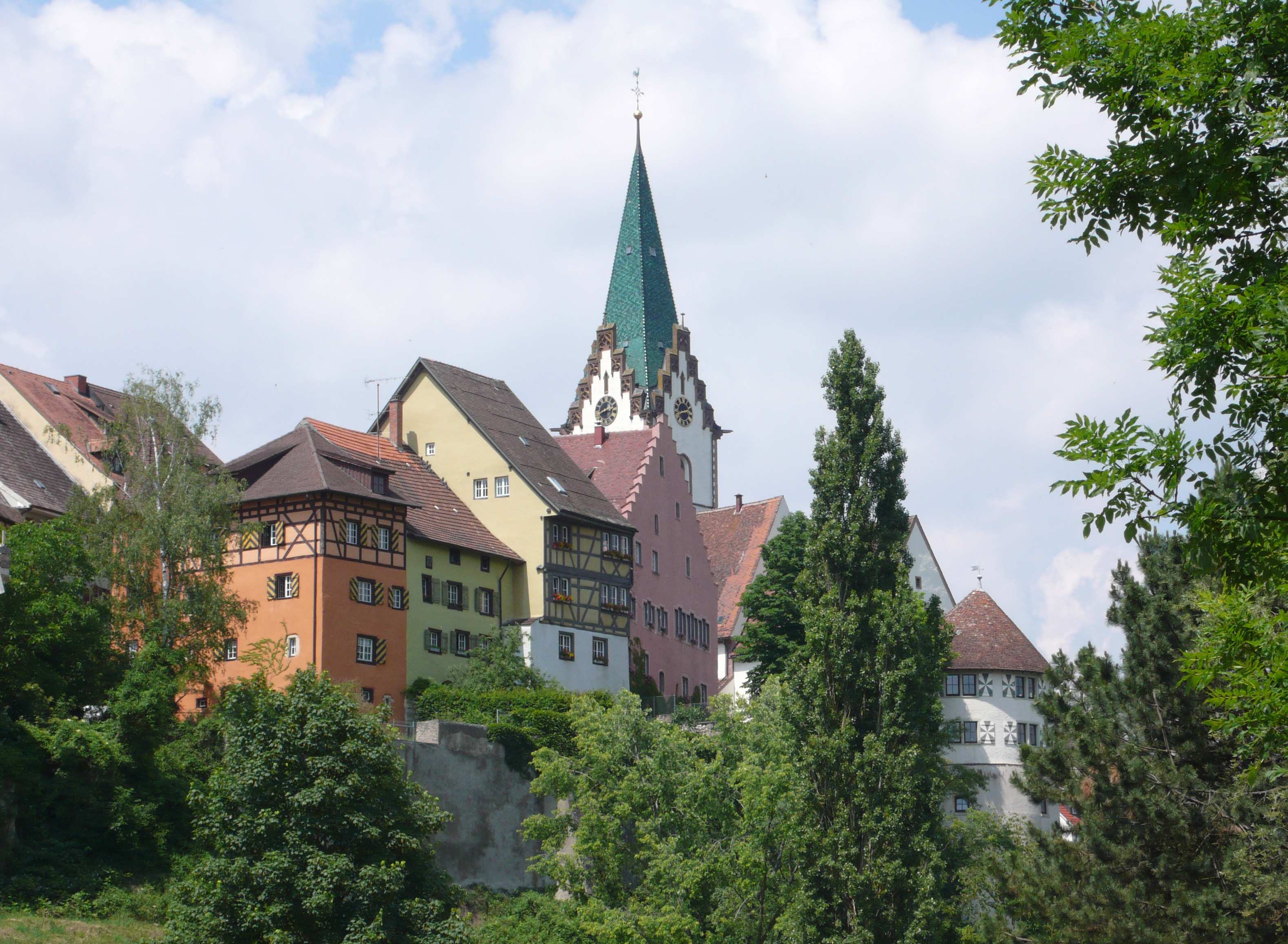
Old Town

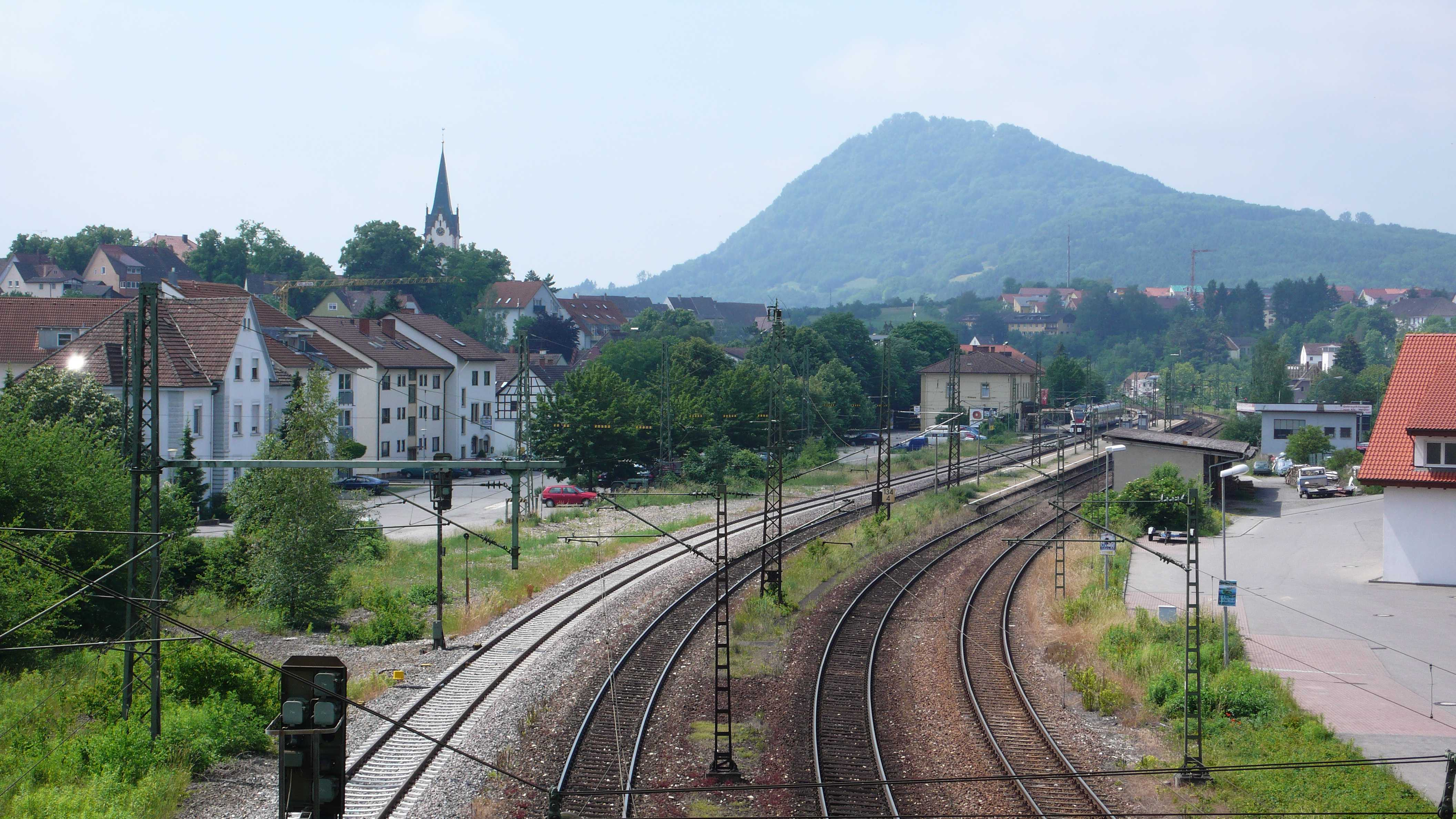
Town with the mountain Hohenhewen in the background
