= SBB GmbH =

Swiss railway company operating in Germany

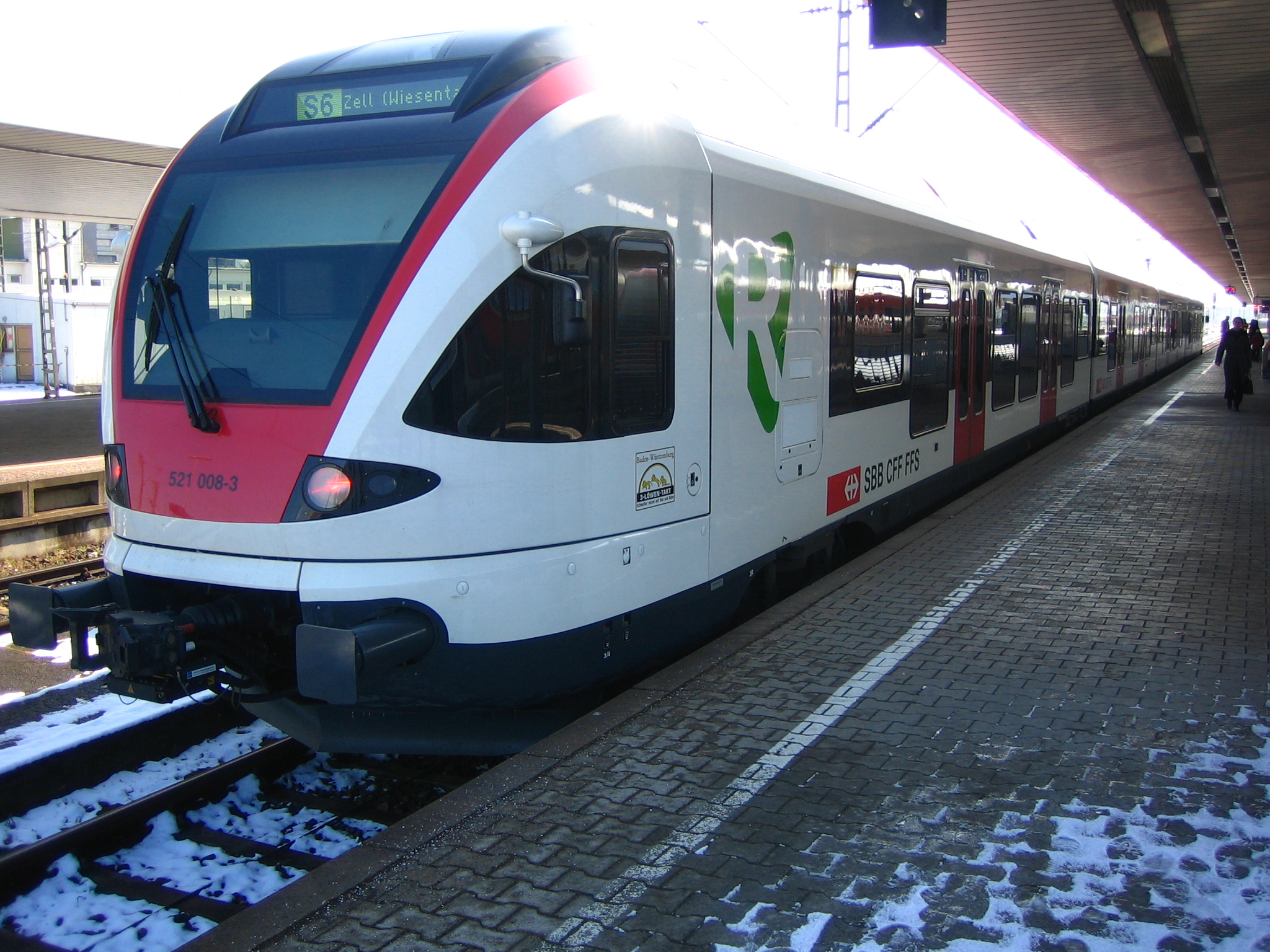
- A Stadler FLIRT at Basel Badischer Bahnhof in 2006

Overview
- Parent company: Swiss Federal Railways
- Headquarters: Konstanz
- Locale: Baden-Württemberg
- Dates of operation: 2005–

Other
- Website: www.sbb-deutschland.de

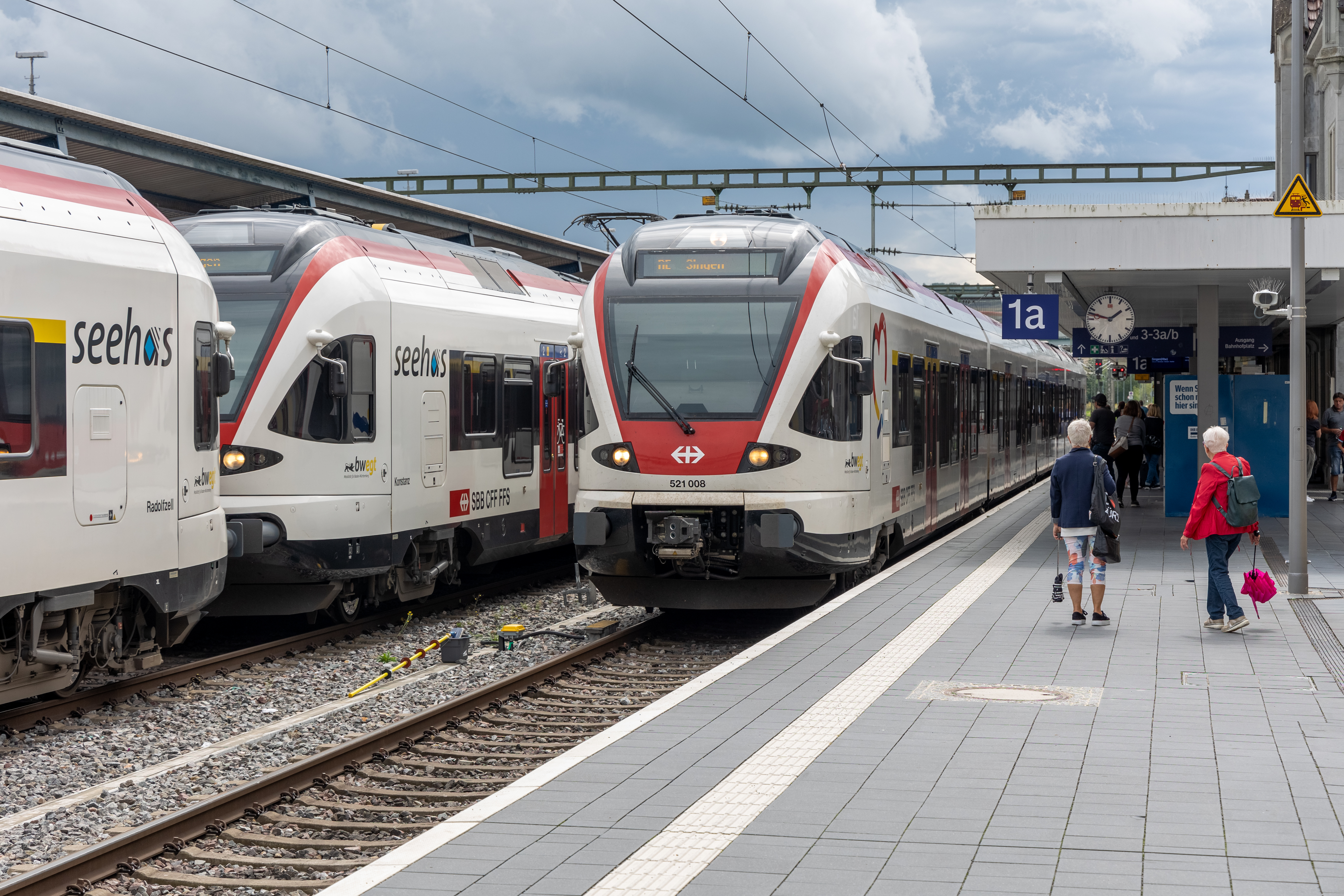
Seehas operated by SBB GmbH at Konstanz station

SBB GmbH, also known as SBB Deutschland, is a railway company that operates services in Germany and the cantons of Basel-City and Schaffhausen in Switzerland. It is a subsidiary of Swiss Federal Railways, the state railway company of Switzerland. It operates various S-Bahn services in Baden-Württemberg near the border with Switzerland, some of which service stations in Switzerland.

== History ==
SBB GmbH was formed in 2005 from the merger of two companies: a different SBB GmbH, and EuroTHURBO. Swiss Federal Railways founded the original SBB GmbH in 2002 to operate the S5 and S6 services of the Basel S-Bahn. That company was based in Lörrach, near Basel. THURBO, itself a subsidiary of Swiss Federal Railways with support from the canton of Thurgau, founded EuroTHURBO in 2003 to handle THURBO's cross-border operations on the Seehas route, which belongs to Bodensee S-Bahn (Lake Constance S-Bahn).

In addition to the Seehas and Basel S-Bahn services, the company began operating the Schaffhausen S-Bahn service between Erzingen and Schaffhausen in 2018, and between Singen (Hohentwiel) and Schaffhausen in 2022.

== Operations ==
As of the December 2023 timetable change, SBB GmbH operates the following services (Seehas and S62 also operate for Bodensee S-Bahn):

- Basel S-Bahn:
  - S5: half-hourly service between Weil am Rhein and Steinen, with peak service to Zell (Wiesental)
  - S6: half-hourly service between Zell (Wiesental) and Basel Bad Bf
- Schaffhausen S-Bahn:
  - S62 Rhyhas: half-hourly service between Singen (Hohentwiel) and Schaffhausen
  - S64: half-hourly service between Erzingen (Baden) and Schaffhausen
- Bodensee S-Bahn
  - S6 Seehas: half-hourly service between Engen and Konstanz

== Rolling stock ==
SBB GmbH owns 20 Stadler FLIRT multiple units and 4 Stadler GTW 2/6 railcars.
