= Tynewydd =

Tynewydd, Tŷ Newydd (Welsh for 'new house') and other variations may refer to:

- Tynewydd, Ceredigion, a village near Y Ferwig
- Tynewydd, Neath Port Talbot, a location
- Tynewydd, Rhondda Cynon Taf, a village near Treherbert
- Tŷ-Newydd, Ceredigion, a village near Llanrhystud
- Tŷ Newydd, a historic house in Llanystumdwy, Gwynedd, and home to the National Writing Centre of Wales
- Tŷ Newydd Burial Chamber, a Neolithic dolmen near Llanfaelog, Anglesey

== See also ==
- Newhouse (disambiguation)
- Maisonneuve (disambiguation)
- Neuhaus (disambiguation)
- Casanova (disambiguation)
