= Neuhauser =

Origin
- Language: German
- Meaning: new house + -er
- Region of origin: Germany, Austria

Other names
- Variant forms: Neuhäuser, Neuhaeuser, Neuheuser

Neuhauser is a German surname. Notable people with this surname include:

- Adele Neuhauser (born 1959), Greek-born Austrian actress
- Charlotte Neuhäuser (born 1998), German politician
- Claudia Neuhauser (born 1962), American mathematical biologist
- Frank Neuhauser (1913–2011), American patent lawyer and spelling bee champion
- Georg Neuhauser (born 1982), Austrian metal vocalist
- Leopold Neuhauser (died after 1813), Austrian musician and composer
- Mary Neuhauser (born 1934), American lawyer and politician

== Other uses ==
- 13980 Neuhauser (1992 NS), a main-belt asteroid discovered in 1992
- Neuhauser Straße, a road in Munich, Germany

== See also ==
- Don Newhauser (born 1947), American former professional baseball player
- Neuhaus (disambiguation)
- Neuhausen (disambiguation)
- Neuhäusel (disambiguation)
