= Welschingen-Neuhausen station =

Railway station in Singen (Hohentwiel), Germany

Welschingen-Neuhausen
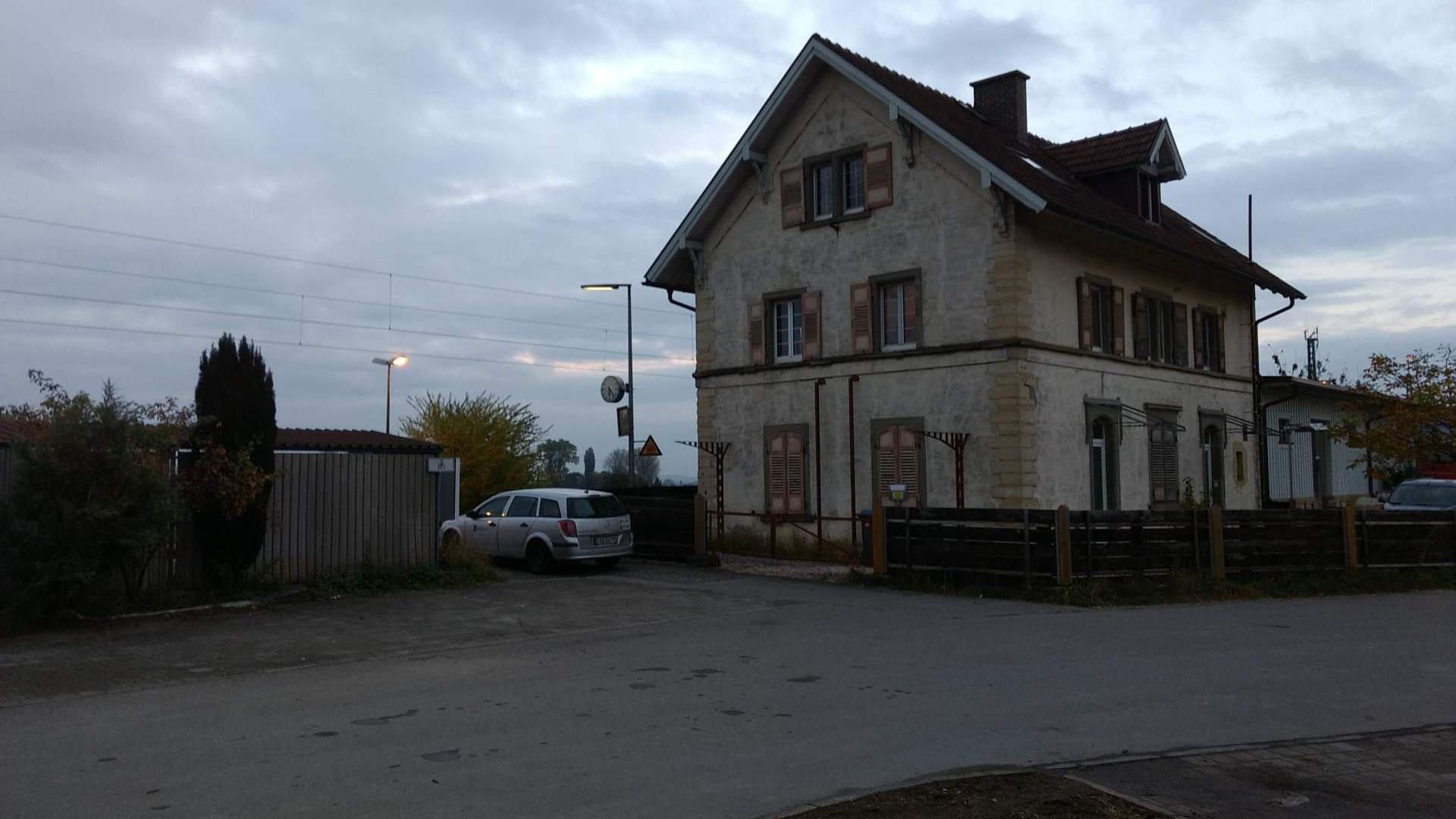
- The station in 2016

General information
- Location: Engen, Konstanz District, Baden-Württemberg; Germany
- Coordinates: 47°50′0.1716″N 08°46′9.6924″E
- Owner: DB Netz
- Lines: Black Forest Railway (KBS 720)
- Platforms: 2 side platforms
- Tracks: 2
- Train operators: SBB GmbH

Other information
- Fare zone: 1 (Verkehrsverbund Hegau-Bodensee)

Services
Preceding station	SBB Deutschland	Following station
Engen Terminus	S6	Mühlhausen (b Engen) towards Konstanz
Location
- Location within Baden-Württemberg Location within Germany

Welschingen-Neuhausen station (German: Bahnhof Singen-Landesgartenschau) is a railway station in the municipality of Engen, in Baden-Württemberg, Germany. The station is situated between the villages of Welschingen and Neuhausen. It is located on the standard gauge Black Forest Railway of Deutsche Bahn.

== Services ==
As of the December 2022 timetable change, the following services stop at Welschingen-Neuhausen:

- Seehas S6: half-hourly service between Engen and Konstanz.

== See also ==
- Bodensee S-Bahn
- Rail transport in Germany
