= Glaselefant =

Landmark in Germany

Coordinates: 51.682912°N 7.881741°E

Glass Elephant
- Glaselefant
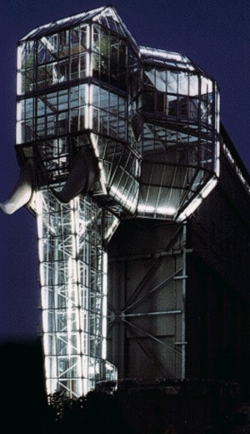
- Landmark of Hamm: Horst Rellecke's Glaselefant
- Interactive map of the Glass Elephant area

General information
- Location: Hamm

Height
- Height: 35 m

Technical details
- Material: Glass, Steel

Design and construction
- Architect: Horst Rellecke
- Known for: Observation tower, greenhouse

The Glaselefant (lit. 'glass elephant') is a landmark in Hamm, Germany. The former coal-washing building in the Maximilian colliery was reconstructed as a walk-in sculpture by the artist and architect Horst Rellecke for Hamm's horticultural Regional Garden Show in 1984.

The "head" of the Elephant houses a palm garden as well as Rellecke's kinetic art pieces. The lift to the palm garten can be found in the Elephant's glass trunk, while a staircase is located at its "rear". At a height of 29 m, the Elephant opens up to a panorama of the Maximilian park, the city of Hamm, and its surroundings.

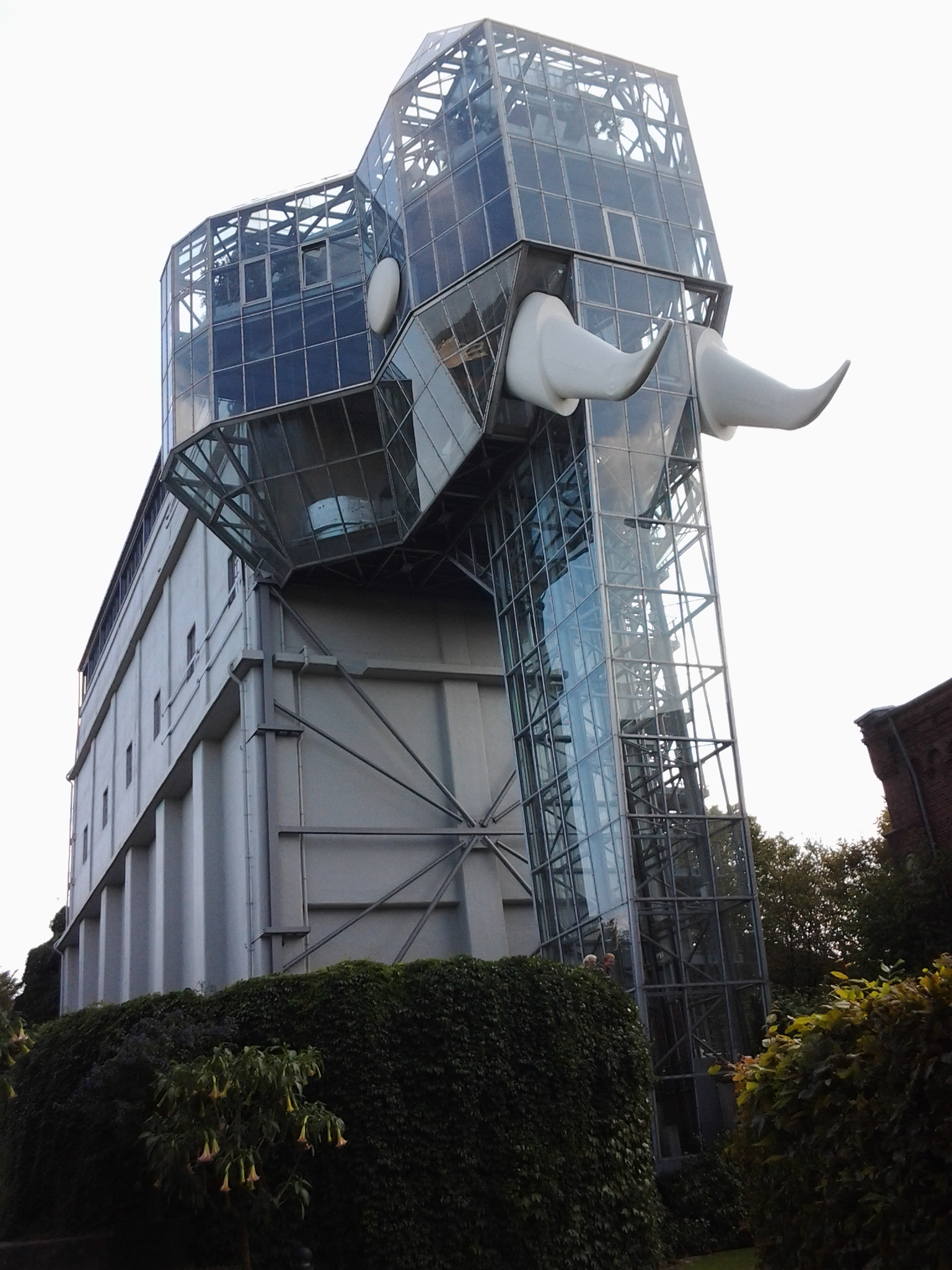
Glaselephant

In 2009, for North Rhine-Westphalia day, which was held in Hamm, the Glass Elephant was lavishly redecorated and equipped with a modern LED lights installation, which changes colours between white, blue, green, yellow, and red. Ever since then, the Glass Elephant changes its colour at regular intervals. During the autumn holidays in North Rhine-Westphalia, the Glass Elephant is used for a light show for the "Herbstleuchten" (English: autumn radiance) festival. During this light show the LED lights installation changes colours and turns on and off to the rhythm of the music.

Replicas and sculptures of the Glass Elephant can be found all over Hamm. A floral sculpture of the Elephant is located in the Kurpark Bad Hamm.
