= Maisonneuve =

Maisonneuve may refer to:

== People ==
- Paul de Chomedey, Sieur de Maisonneuve (1612–1676), French officer who contributed to the foundation of Montreal
- Jules Germain François Maisonneuve (1809–1897), surgeon of 19th-century Paris
- Paul Maisonneuve (footballer) (born 1986), French football player

== Places ==
- Maisonneuve, Quebec, a former city (1883-1918) now amalgamated to Montreal
- Maisonneuve (federal electoral district), a former federal electoral district represented in the Canadian House of Commons, and located in the province of Quebec
- Maisonneuve (provincial electoral district), a former Quebec provincial electoral district, now part of Hochelaga-Maisonneuve
- Maisonneuve, Vienne, a commune of the Vienne département, in France

== Streets ==
- De Maisonneuve Boulevard, Montreal, Quebec
- Maisonneuve Boulevard, Gatineau, Quebec

== Other uses ==
- Maisonneuve (magazine), a Canadian magazine
- Maisonneuve Monument, an 1895 monument in Montreal
- Maisonneuve fracture, a proximal fibular fracture associated with a distal tibial (ankle) fracture
