= Neuhausen =

Neuhausen may refer to:

== Places ==
- Neuhausen am Rheinfall, a town in the canton of Schaffhausen, Switzerland
- Neuhausen auf den Fildern, a municipality in Baden-Württemberg, Germany
- Neuhausen (Enz), a municipality in Baden-Württemberg, Germany
- Neuhausen ob Eck, a municipality in Baden-Württemberg, Germany
  - Neuhausen ob Eck Airfield, former military base and currently used as a business park and for a music festival
- Neuhausen, a former village, now part of the town of Engen in Baden-Württemberg, Germany
- Neuhausen/Spree, a municipality in Brandenburg, Germany
- Neuhausen, Saxony, a municipality in the district of Freiberg in Saxony, Germany
- Neuhausen, a borough of Worms, Germany
- Neuhausen, a city in East Prussia, today Guryevsk, Kaliningrad Oblast
- Neuhausen, a borough in southeastern Estonia, today Vastseliina

== Transportation ==
- Neuhausen railway station, a railway station in Switzerland
- Neuhausen Rheinfall railway station, a railway station in Switzerland
- Neuhausen Badischer Bahnhof, a railway station in Switzerland
- Welschingen-Neuhausen station, a railway station in Germany

== Other ==
- the Danish name for the SIG Sauer P210
- Vastseliina Castle

== See also ==
- Neuhaus (disambiguation)
- Neuhausen-Nymphenburg, a borough of Munich, Germany
