= Paul Maisonneuve (footballer) =

French footballer (born 1986)

Personal information
- Date of birth: 22 December 1986 (age 39)
- Place of birth: Nîmes, France
- Height: 1.81 m (5 ft 11 in)
- Position: Midfielder

Team information
- Current team: Bergerac

Senior career*
Years	Team	Apps	(Gls)
2006–2010	Nîmes	77	(0)
2010–2011	Le Pontet	22	(3)
2011–2012	Gazélec Ajaccio	10	(0)
2012–2014	Martigues	57	(2)
2014–2020	Pau	137	(2)
2020–	Bergerac	36	(7)
- * Club domestic league appearances and goals as of 04:42, 14 June 2022 (UTC)

Paul Maisonneuve (born 22 December 1986) is a French professional footballer who plays as a midfielder for Championnat National 1 club Bergerac.
