= Neuhäusel (disambiguation) =

Neuhäusel or Neuhaeusel may refer to:

== Alsace ==
- Neuhaeusel (German: Neuhäusel), a commune in the Bas-Rhin department in Alsace in north-eastern France

== Germany ==
- Neuhäusel, an Ortsgemeinde in the Westerwaldkreis in Rhineland-Palatinate, Germany

== Slovakia ==
- Nové Zámky (German: Neuhäusel, Neuhäusl)
- Liptovský Hrádok (German: Neuhäusel in der Liptau)
