= Tŷ-Newydd, Ceredigion =

Village in Ceredigion, Wales

Coordinates: 52.294599°N 4.131516°W

Tŷ-Newydd
- Location within Ceredigion
- OS grid reference: SN 5473 6841
  - Cardiff: 69.5 mi (111.8 km)
  - London: 179.1 mi (288.2 km)
- Community: Llanrhystud
- Principal area: Ceredigion
- Country: Wales
- Sovereign state: United Kingdom
- Post town: Aberystwyth
- Postcode district: SY23
- Police: Dyfed-Powys
- Fire: Mid and West Wales
- Ambulance: Welsh
- UK Parliament: Ceredigion Preseli
- Senedd Cymru – Welsh Parliament: Ceredigion

Tŷ-Newydd is a small village in the community of Llanrhystud, Ceredigion, Wales, which is 69.5 miles (111.8 km) from Cardiff and 179.1 miles (288.2 km) from London. Tŷ-Newydd is represented in the Senedd by Elin Jones (Plaid Cymru) and is part of the Ceredigion Preseli constituency in the House of Commons.

== See also ==
- List of localities in Wales by population
