= Regional Garden Show =

Exhibition on horticulture

A Regional Garden Show (German: Landesgartenschau; pronounced [ˌlandəsˈɡaʁtn̩ʃaʊ̯]) is an exhibition on horticulture that takes place on a regular basis in several German and Austrian states. In Germany, a state horticultural show at the state level is the smaller counterpart to the Bundesgartenschau and the International Horticultural Show, in Austria there is no counterpart so far.

== Germany ==
=== History ===
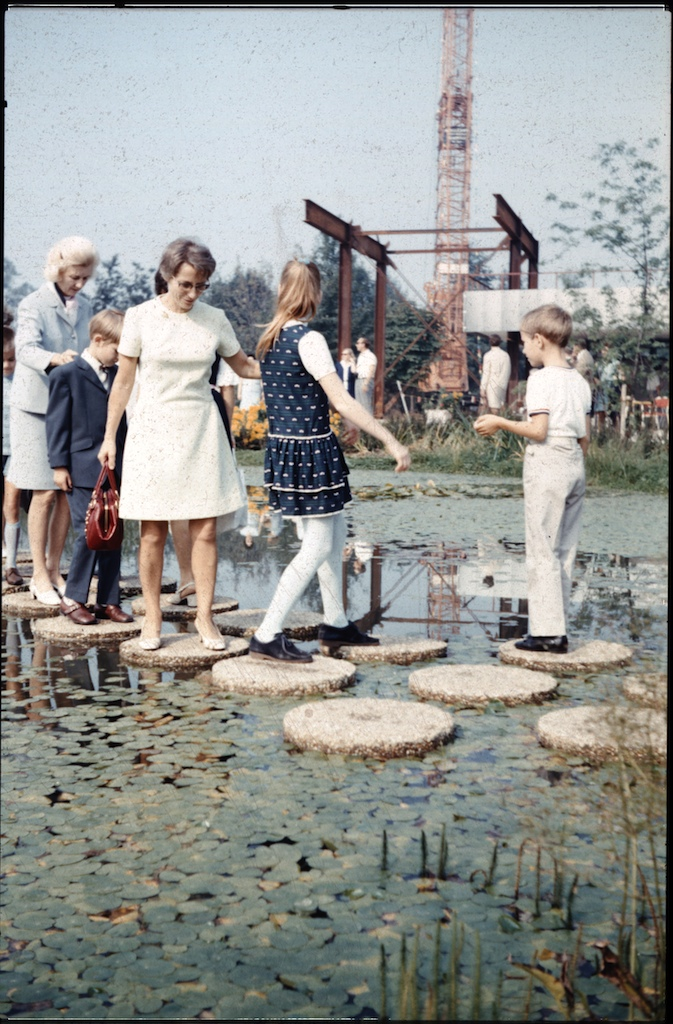

In the federal states of Baden-Württemberg and Bavaria state garden shows have been held since 1980. In North Rhine-Westphalia there was already a first state garden show in 1970, other German states adopted the model later. In the Austrian federal states Upper Austria and Lower Austria, too, state garden shows have been taking place for several years in alternating two-year cycles. In 1980, the first cross-border national horticultural show in Germany took place in Ulm/Neu-Ulm (Baden-Württemberg/Bavaria).

=== Objectives and financing ===
The garden shows are intended to improve the quality of life and the ecological climate in the cities. Often the garden shows also serve urban or regional political development objectives. For this reason, garden shows are usually not placed in particularly beautiful landscapes, but rather in areas which are particularly disadvantaged (e.g. due to mining damage), where the garden shows are aimed at supporting structure and help to promote urban planning. The investments which are made within the framework of the regional garden shows help the respective district to become more attractive and usually also to remain attractive. In addition national horticultural shows are today also measures of city marketing, since they can increase as a large meeting lasting half a year also the awareness level of a city.

The municipalities, which often realize a garden show with the help of state funds, take a calculated financial risk. While some state garden shows closed with a "black 0" or even with slight profits, others exceeded their budget and had to be subsidised retrospectively. Particularly in municipalities with a strained budget situation, state garden shows are therefore sometimes controversial despite their long-term advantages, in some cases there have already been citizens' petitions or citizens' decisions.

=== Garden shows in the individual federal states ===
==== Baden-Württemberg ====
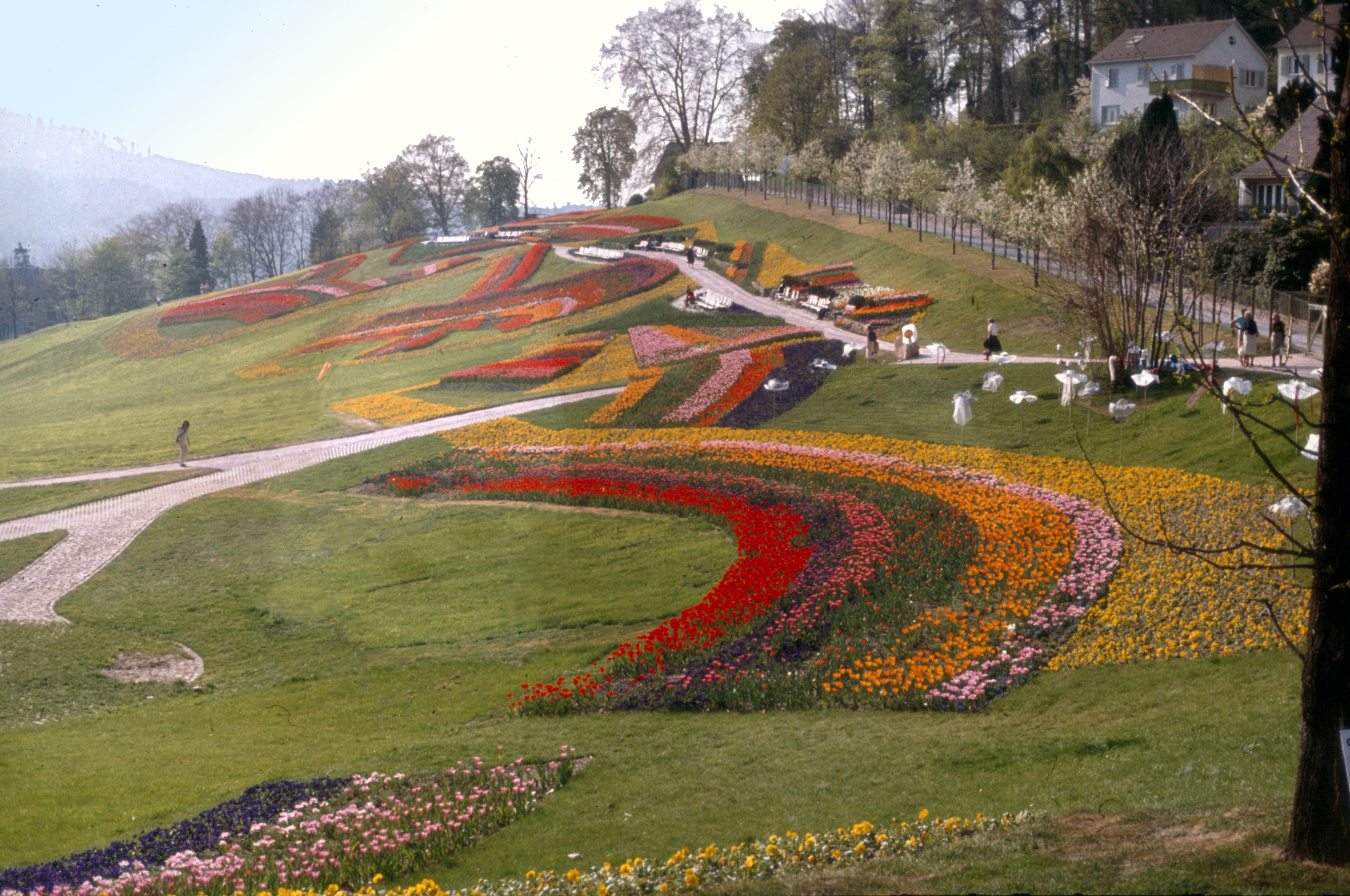
Baden-Baden 1981

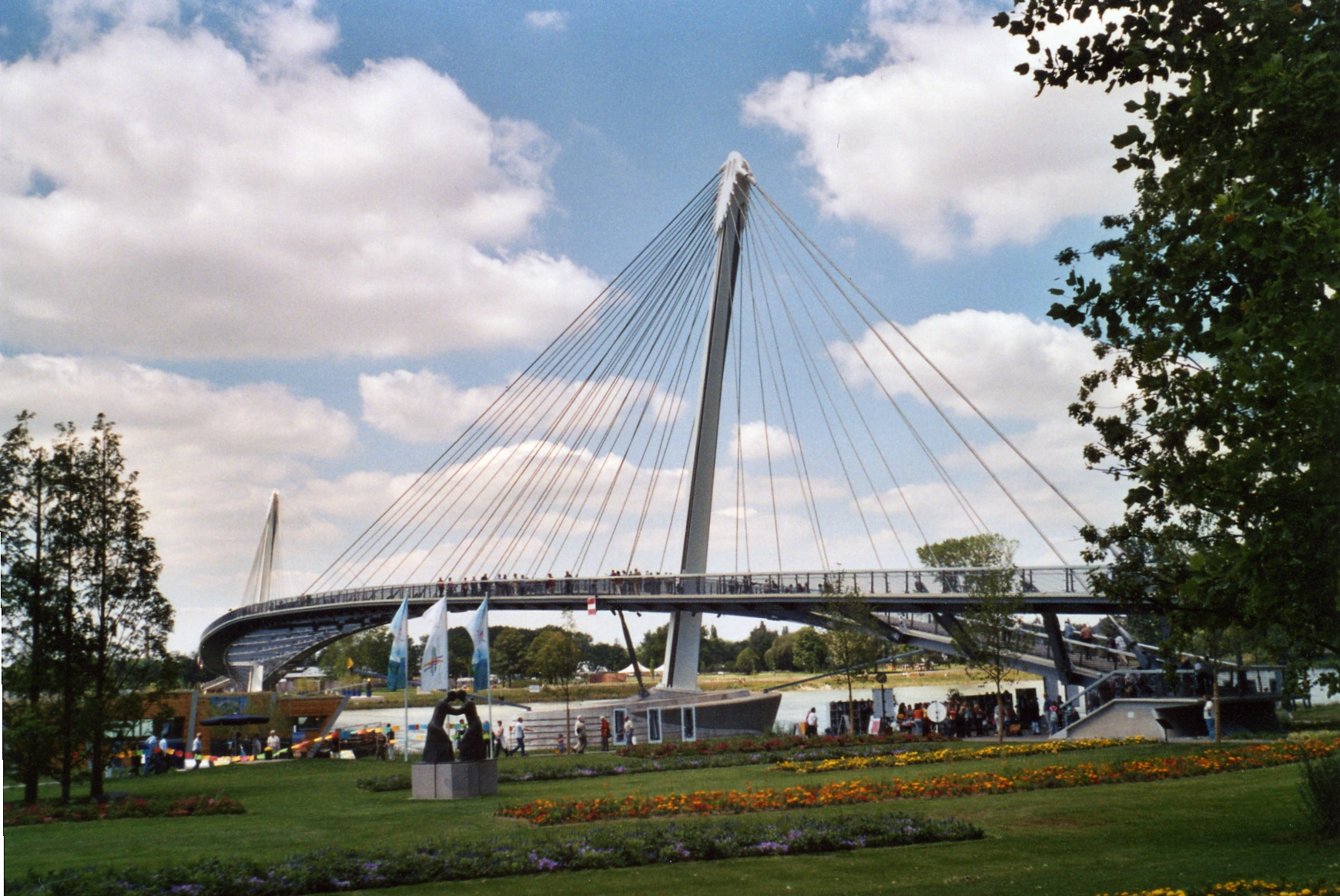
Kehl and Strasbourg 2004 ("Garden Show of the Two Banks"): Mimram Bridge

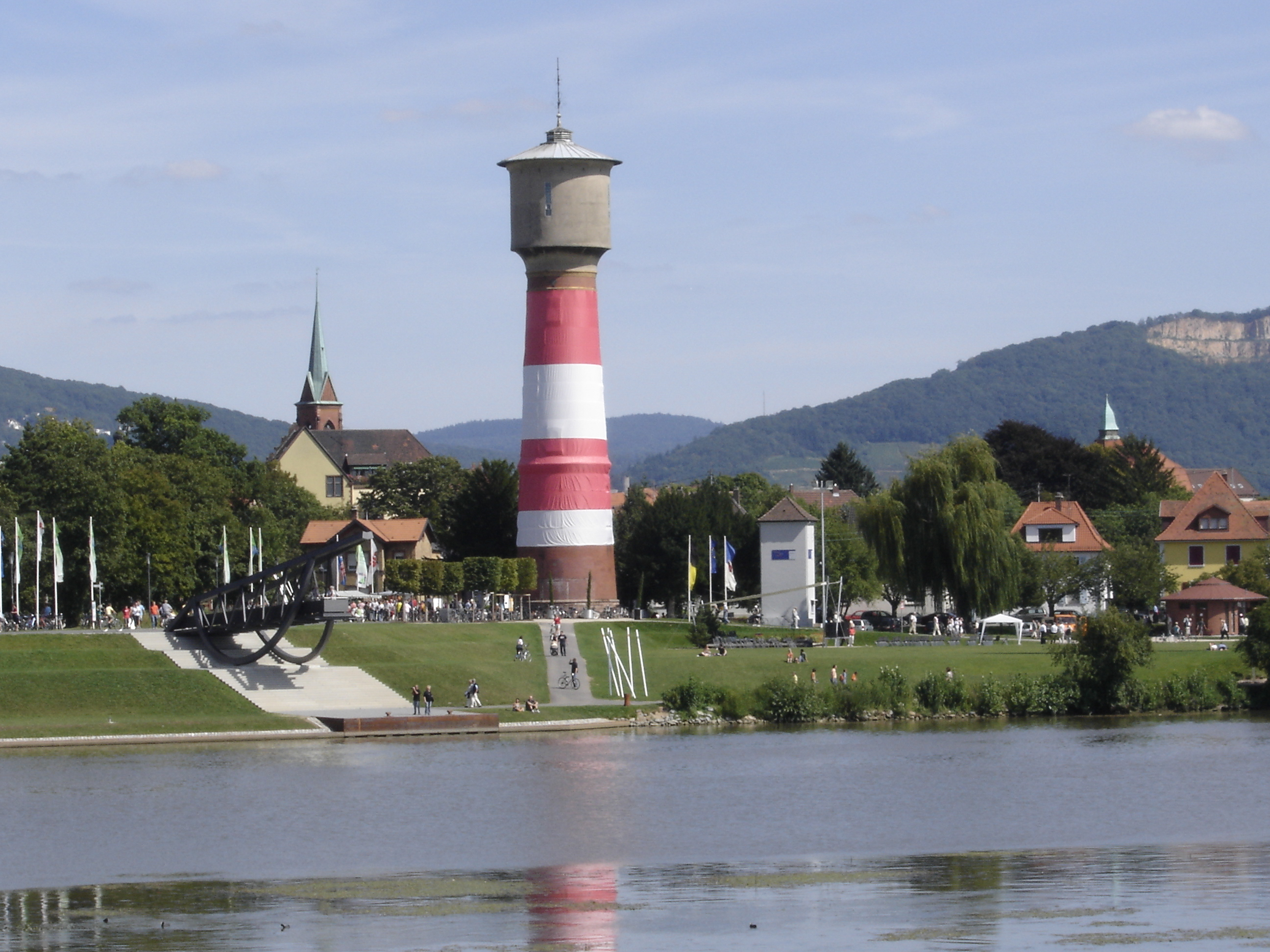
Ladenburg 2005

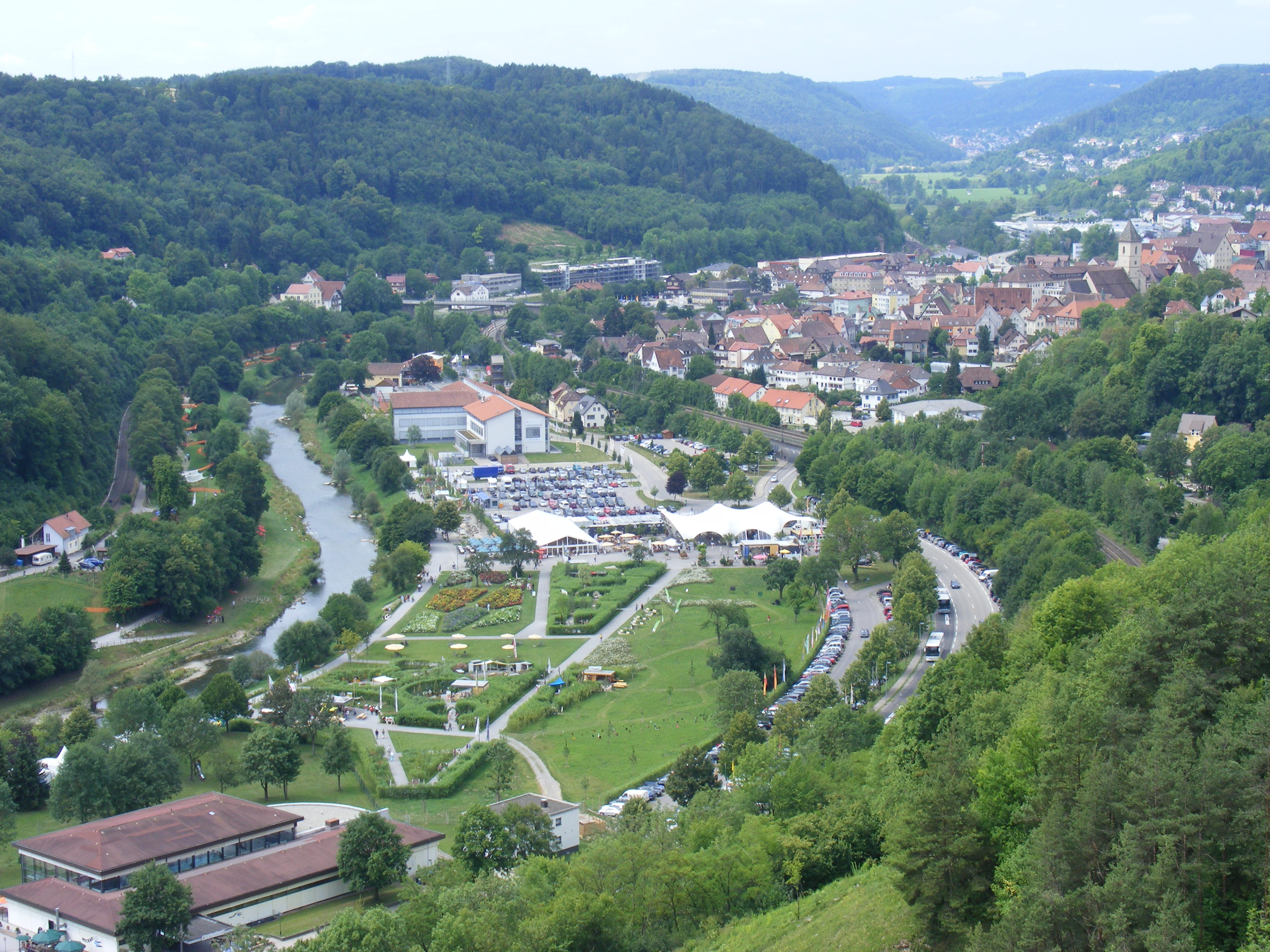
Horb am Neckar 2011

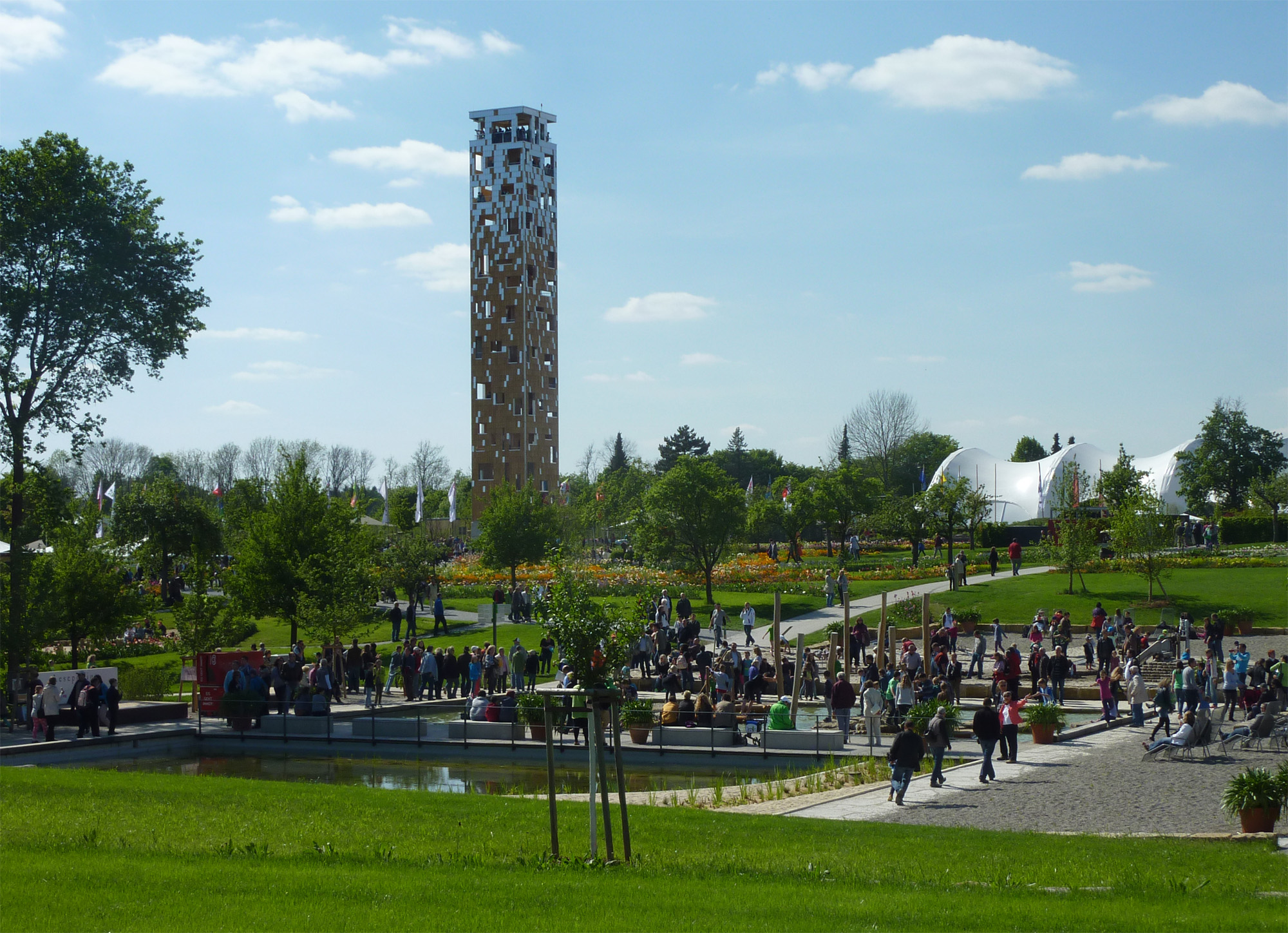
Swabian Gmünd 2014: Skystormers

From 1980 to 2000, the "large horticultural shows" were held annually in Baden-Württemberg. Since 2001, they have been held annually, alternating with the "small state garden shows", the so-called green projects. For green projects, the state provides a subsidy of a maximum of €2 million for green projects and a maximum of five million euros for state horticultural shows, whereby the municipalities also have to make corresponding contributions of their own. By 2010, the state has granted almost 80 million euros in state subsidies. This has resulted in at least three times and in some cases even seven times the amount of investment on the part of the municipalities; they invested around 153 million euros: In the process, around 625 hectares of green spaces were created, redesigned and permanently secured. The State Horticultural Shows and green projects provide the impetus for comprehensive structural developments that create a spirit of optimism in the municipalities and strengthen their economic development. An expert commission will evaluate the applications and assess the submitted concepts on site. The Council of Ministers then awards the state garden shows and green projects in a cabinet meeting.

The last strongly visited State Garden Show in Baden-Württemberg before the introduction of the "Green Projects" in 2001 was the 1992 State Garden Show in the "Gold City" of Pforzheim with a peak number of visitors of 1.6 million. Thereafter, the number of visitors at state level also fell well below one million in each case. For this reason, the state government decided as early as 1996 to carry out the smaller "green projects" in Baden-Württemberg every two years from 2001 onwards. In 2014 Schwäbisch Gmünd set a new record with around 2 million visitors.

1. 1980: Ulm/Neu-Ulm
2. 1981: Baden-Baden
3. 1982: Schwäbisch Hall
4. 1983: Lörrach – Landschaftspark Grütt
5. 1984: Reutlingen
6. 1985: Heilbronn
7. 1986: Freiburg im Breisgau
8. 1988: Ettlingen
9. 1989: Bietigheim-Bissingen
10. 1990: Sindelfingen
11. 1991: Hockenheim
12. 1992: Pforzheim
13. 1993: IGA Stuttgart
14. 1994: Bad Dürrheim
15. 1996: Böblingen
16. 1997: Mosbach
17. 1998: Plochingen
18. 1999: Weil am Rhein
19. 2000: Singen (Hohentwiel)
20. 2001: Green Project Pfullendorf
21. 2002: Ostfildern
22. 2003: Green Project Nordheim (Württemberg)
23. 2003: Green Project Tuttlingen
24. 2004: Kehl und Straßburg – Garten der zwei Ufer
25. 2005: Green Project Ladenburg
26. 2006: Heidenheim an der Brenz
27. 2007: Green Project Rheinfelden (Baden)
28. 2008: Bad Rappenau
29. 2009: Green Project Rechberghausen
30. 2010: Villingen-Schwenningen
31. 2011: Green Project Horb am Neckar
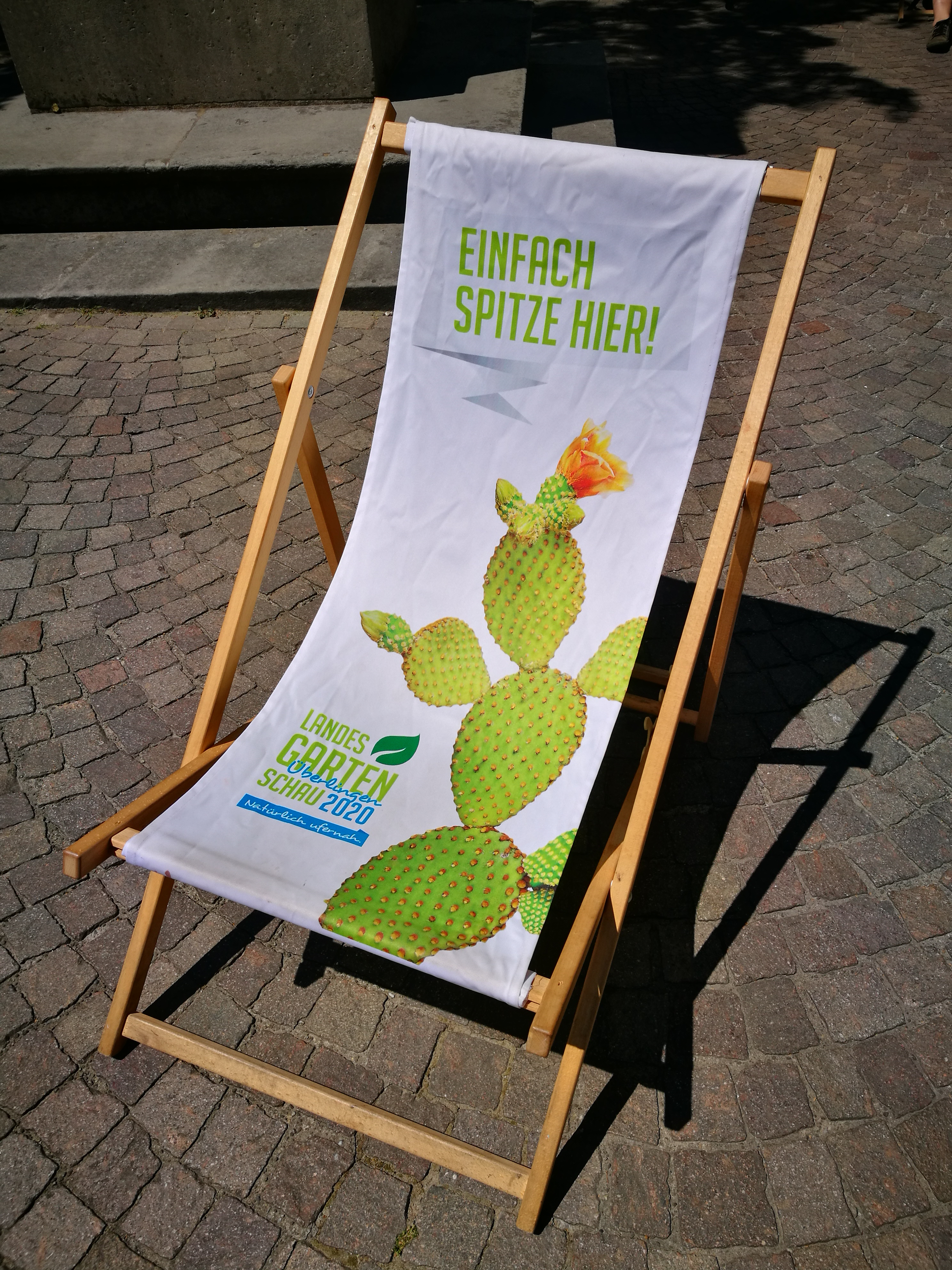
  Deck chair with advertisement for the State Garden Show 2020 in Überlingen
32. 2012: Nagold: Grüne Urbanität
33. 2013: Green Project Sigmaringen
34. 2014: Schwäbisch Gmünd, Record number of visitors with approx. 2 million
35. 2015: Green Project Mühlacker
36. 2016: Öhringen
37. 2017: Green Project Bad Herrenalb
38. 2018: Lahr
39. 2019: Green Project Remstal
40. 2020: Überlingen
41. 2021: Green Project Eppingen
42. 2022: Neuenburg am Rhein
43. 2023: Green Project Balingen
44. 2024: Wangen im Allgäu
45. 2025: Green Project Freudenstadt/Baiersbronn
46. 2026: Ellwangen
47. 2027: Green Project Bad Urach
48. 2028: Rottweil
49. 2029: Green Project Vaihingen/Enz
50. 2030: Ulm

==== Bavaria ====
After North Rhine-Westphalia, Bavaria, together with Baden-Württemberg, was the first federal state to hold state garden shows. The Free State initially started in an irregular rhythm with four State Horticultural Shows in Neu-Ulm, Augsburg, Dinkelsbühl and Straubing. Since 1990 the State Garden Shows have been held in Bavaria every two years, at even-numbered years, in addition to the Federal Garden Shows, which take place at odd-numbered years. In the uneven years in between there has been a small horticultural show in Bavaria since 1995 called Nature in the City, in which, similar to the State Horticultural Shows, but on a smaller scale, improvements in green and recreational structures form the framework for the horticultural show.

Up to and including 2015, the Free State and the EU have provided 83 million euros in funding for Bavarian garden shows, almost 23 million visitors have been recorded and around 460 hectares of public green spaces have been created over these years. Cities and municipalities can apply to the Society for the Promotion of the Bavarian State Horticultural Shows (FÖG) to organise a garden show. The awarding procedure and also the type and implementation of the state funding has been criticised on numerous occasions. Unter anderem hielt der Bayerische Oberste Rechnungshof die Vergabe der Gartenschauen in Bayern für intransparent und empfahl, sie auf eine neue Grundlage zu stellen, was auch geschah.

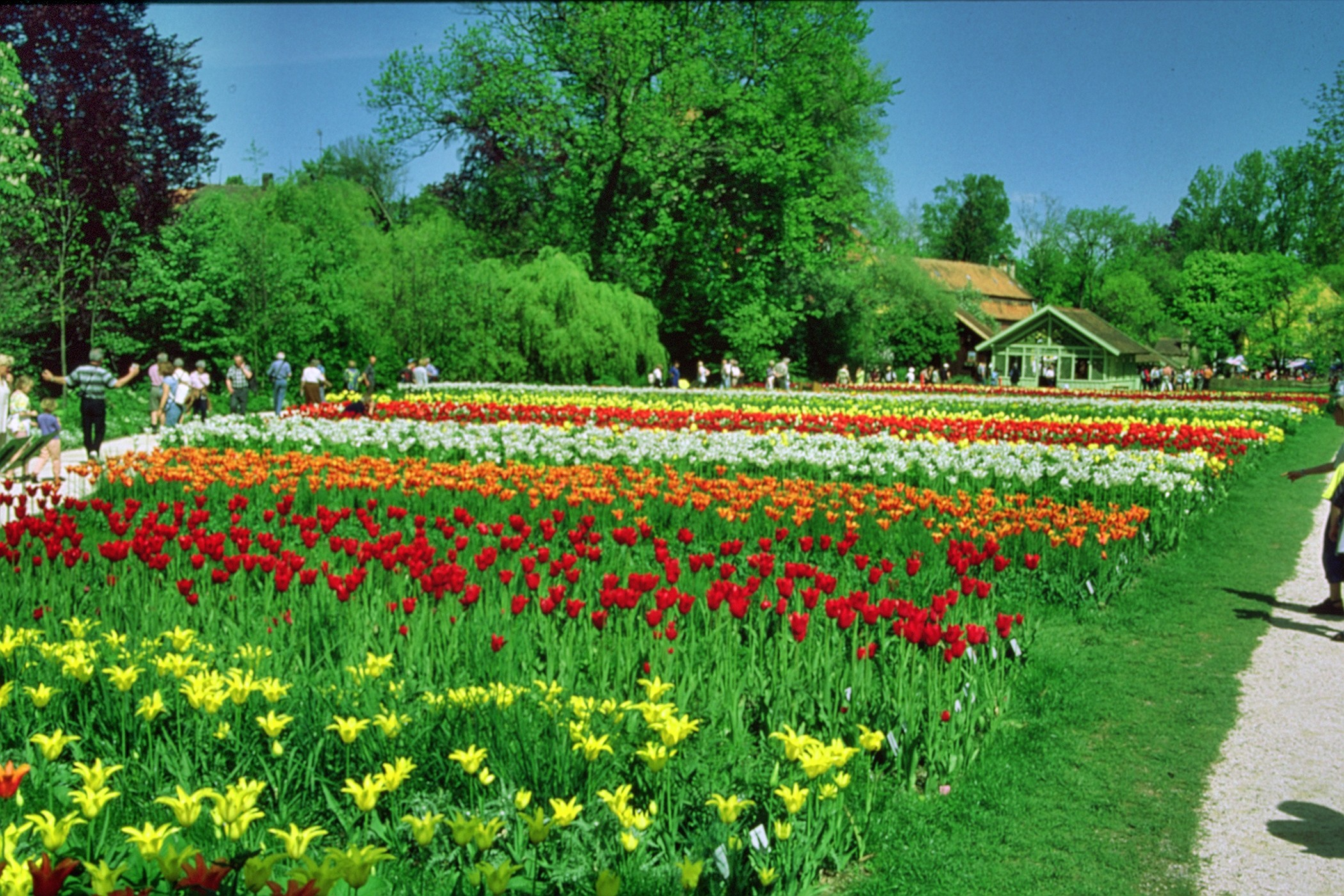
Memmingen 2000

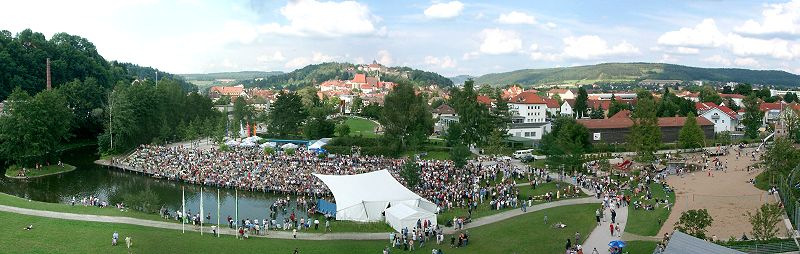
Kronach 2002

1. 1980: Regional Garden Show Neu-Ulm/Ulm
2. 1985: Regional Garden Show Augsburg
3. 1988: Regional Garden Show Dinkelsbühl
4. 1989: Regional Garden Show Straubing
5. 1990: Regional Garden Show Würzburg with 2.5 million visitors is considered the most visited Bavarian State Garden Show
6. 1992: Regional Garden Show Ingolstadt
7. 1994: Regional Garden Show Hof (Saale)
8. 1995: Small Regional Garden Show Waldkraiburg
9. 1996: Regional Garden Show Amberg
10. 1997: Small Regional Garden Show Arnstein
11. 1998: Regional Garden Show Neumarkt in der Oberpfalz
12. 1999: Small Regional Garden Show Neustadt bei Coburg
13. 2000: Regional Garden Show Memmingen, (1.3 million visitors)
14. 2001: Small Regional Garden Show Cham (Oberpfalz)
15. 2002: Regional Garden Show Kronach
16. 2003: Small Regional Garden Show Roth
17. 2004: Burghausen
18. 2006: Regional Garden Show Marktredwitz and Cheb
19. 2007: Small Regional Garden Show Waldkirchen
20. 2008: Regional Garden Show Neu-Ulm (mit großen städtebaulichen Investitionen im Rahmen des Projekts Neu-Ulm 21)
21. 2009: Small Regional Garden Show Rain
22. 2010: Regional Garden Show Rosenheim, „Innspiration"
23. 2011: Small Regional Garden Show Kitzingen
24. 2012: Regional Garden Sho Bamberg
25. 2013: Small Regional Garden Show Tirschenreuth
26. 2014: Regional Garden Show Deggendorf
27. 2015: Small Regional Garden Show Alzenau
28. 2016: Regional Garden Show Bayreuth
29. 2017: Small Regional Garden Show Pfaffenhofen an der Ilm
30. 2018: Regional Garden Show Würzburg
31. 2019: Small Regional Garden Show Wassertrüdingen
32. 2020: Regional Garden Show Ingolstadt
33. 2021: Small Regional Garden Show Lindau (Bodensee), „Ring aus Inselgärten – Natur in der Stadt 2021"
34. 2022: Regional Garden Show Freyung
35. 2024: Regional Garden Show Kirchheim
36. 2025: Regional Garden Show Furth im Wald

==== Brandenburg ====
1. 2000 Luckau
2. 2002 Eberswalde
3. 2006 Rathenow, „Den Farben auf der Spur" (On the trail of colours)
4. 2009 Oranienburg, „Traumlandschaften einer Kurfürstin" (Dreamscapes of an Electress)
5. 2013 Prenzlau, „Die grüne Wonne" (The green delight)
6. 2019 Wittstock/Dosse „Grüne Bürgerstadt" (Green civil town)
7. 2022 Beelitz „Gartenfest für alle Sinne" (Garden party for all senses)

==== Hesse ====
1. 1994: Fulda „Der Garten Hessens" (The Garden of Hesse)
2. 2002: Hanau „Mit allen Sinnen erleben!" (Experience with all senses!)
3. 2006: Bad Wildungen
4. 2010: Bad Nauheim „Traumhafte Gärten im Herzen der Stadt" (Fantastic gardens in the heart of the city)
5. 2014: Gießen „Auf zu neuen Ufern" (Off to new shores)
6. 2018: Bad Schwalbach „Natur erleben. Natürlich Leben" (Experience nature. Live naturally.)
7. 2023: Fulda

==== Mecklenburg-Western Pomerania ====
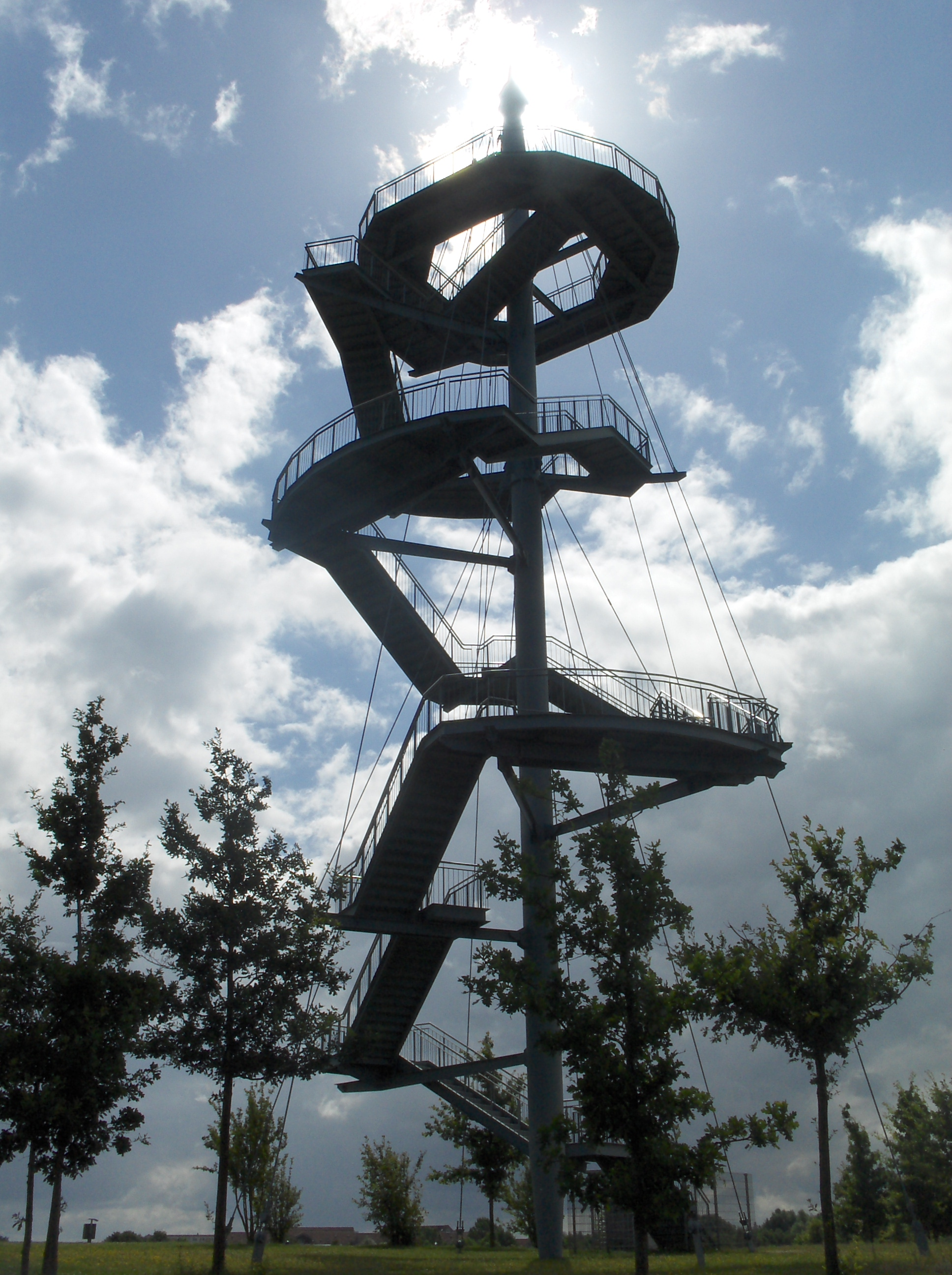
Wismar 2002: observation tower on the area

1. 2002: Wismar

Mecklenburg-Western Pomerania is the only federal state that has so far hosted only one state garden show. A show was to take place in the landscape park Brodaer Höhe of Neubrandenburg, but it did not go beyond the design phase. Originally, a further State Garden Show was scheduled for 2014/2015. This was initially suspended because the applicants Güstrow and Putbus were unable to present a financially sustainable concept.

In the year 2003 an International Horticultural Exhibition was held in Rostock. In Schwerin a successful National Garden Show followed in 2009. For 2025 Schwerin was awarded the contract by the BUGA Society for a further Federal Horticultural Show, which is to further develop the 2009 concept and make the southern shore of Lake Schwerin more accessible to residents and visitors. A referendum was to decide on the organisation of the show on the election date of the Bundestag elections 2017 in September. After the state government failed to provide the financial means, the BUGA 2025 was returned to the German National Garden Show Society mbH (DBG) 2017. On July 26, 2018, Rostock launched a BUGA application and was officially awarded the contract to host the National Garden Show 2025 on September 10, 2018.

==== Lower Saxony ====
1. 2002: Bad Zwischenahn, „Park of gardens"
2. 2004: Wolfsburg
3. 2006: Winsen (Luhe)
4. 2010: Bad Essen
5. 2014: Papenburg
6. 2018: Bad Iburg
7. 2022: Bad Gandersheim
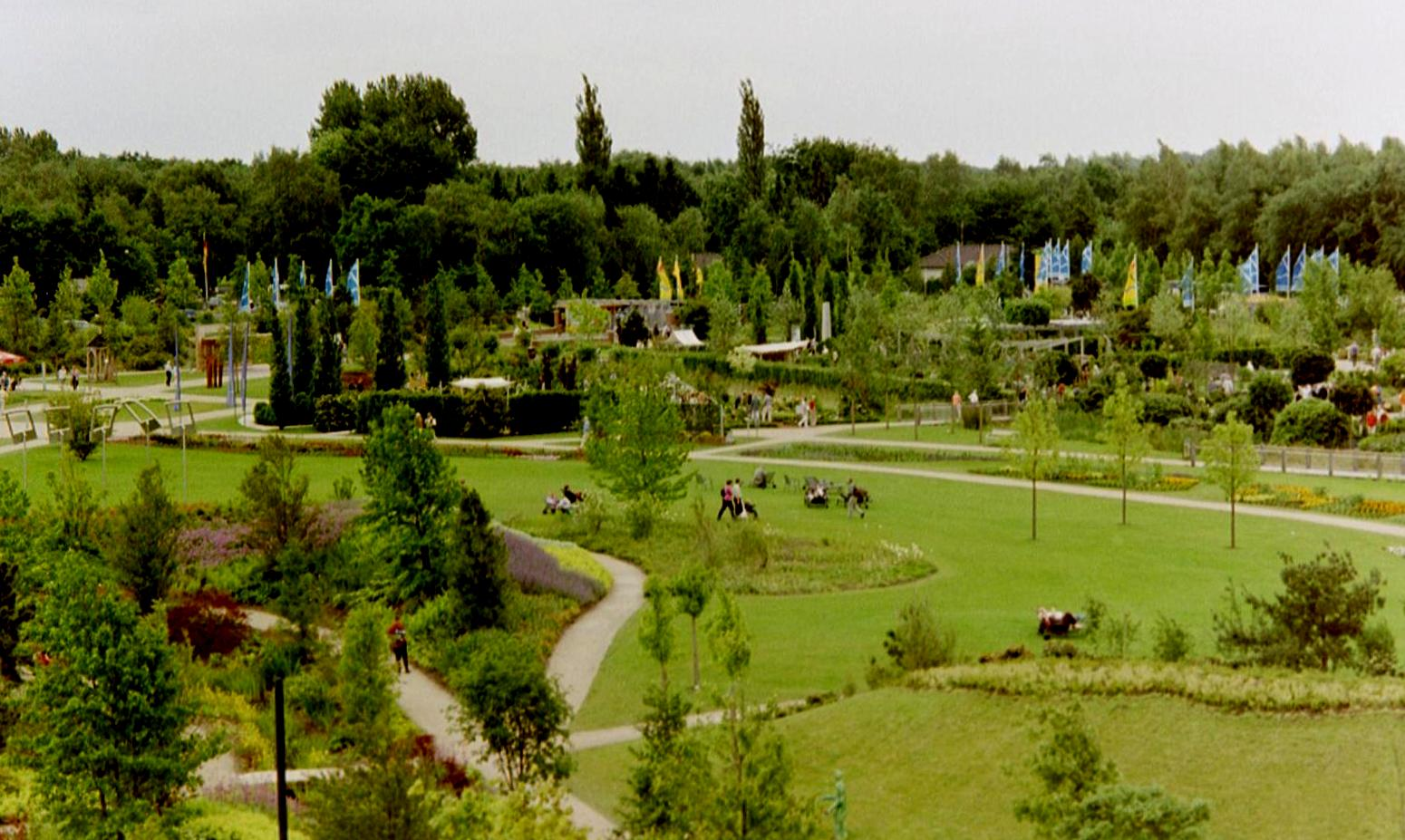
Bad Zwischenahn (2002)

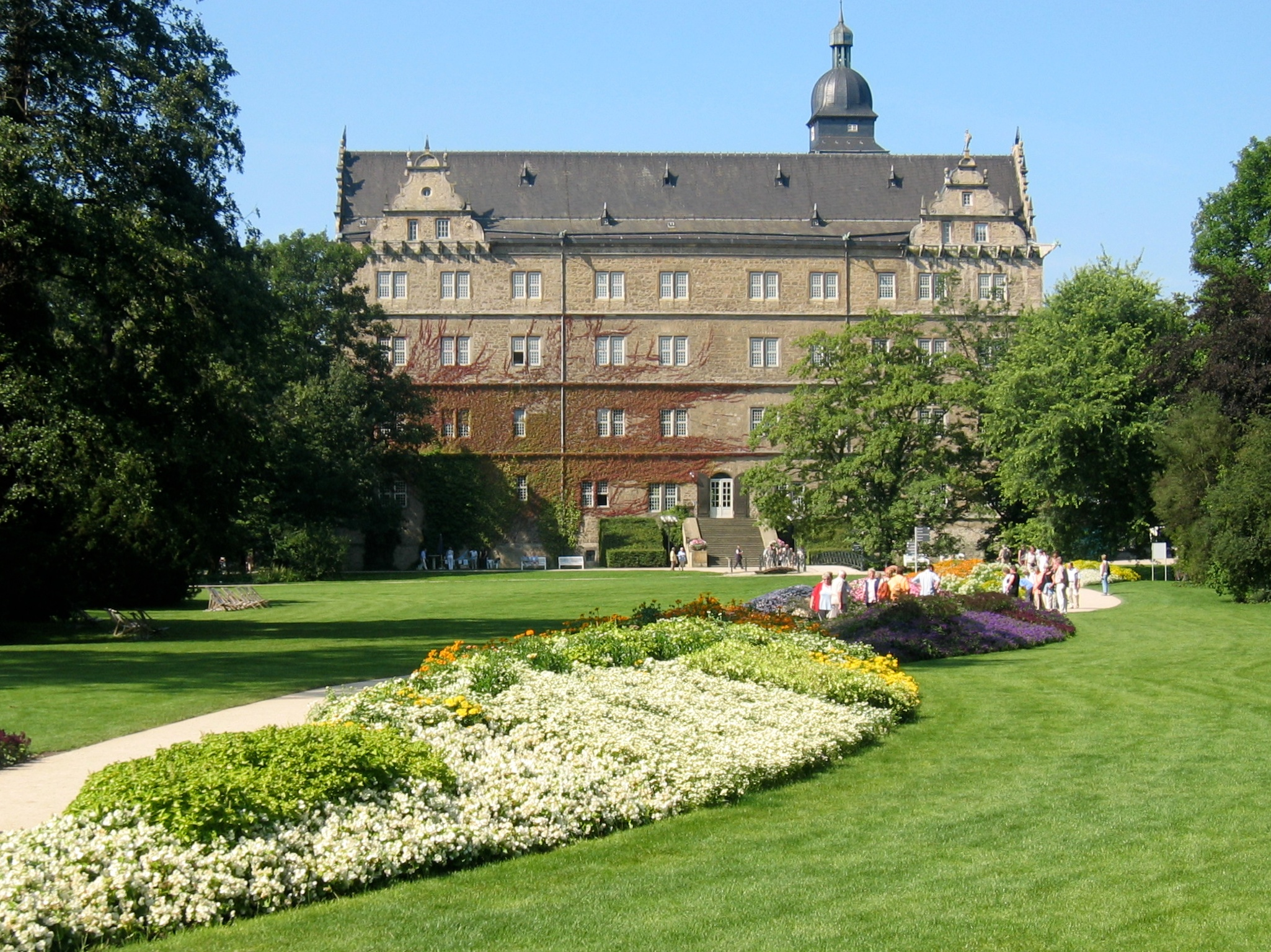
Wolfsburg (2004)

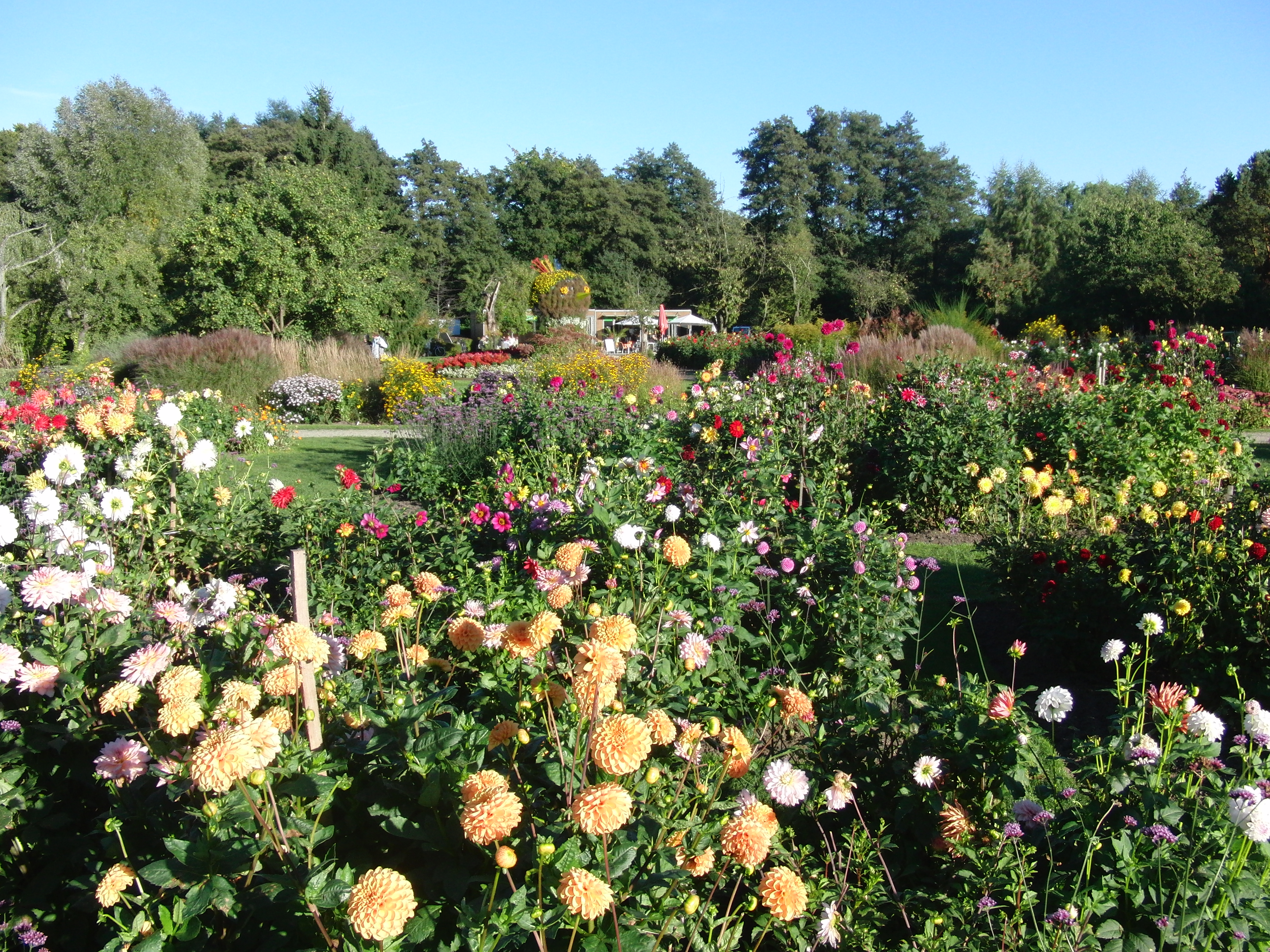
Winsen (Luhe) (2006)

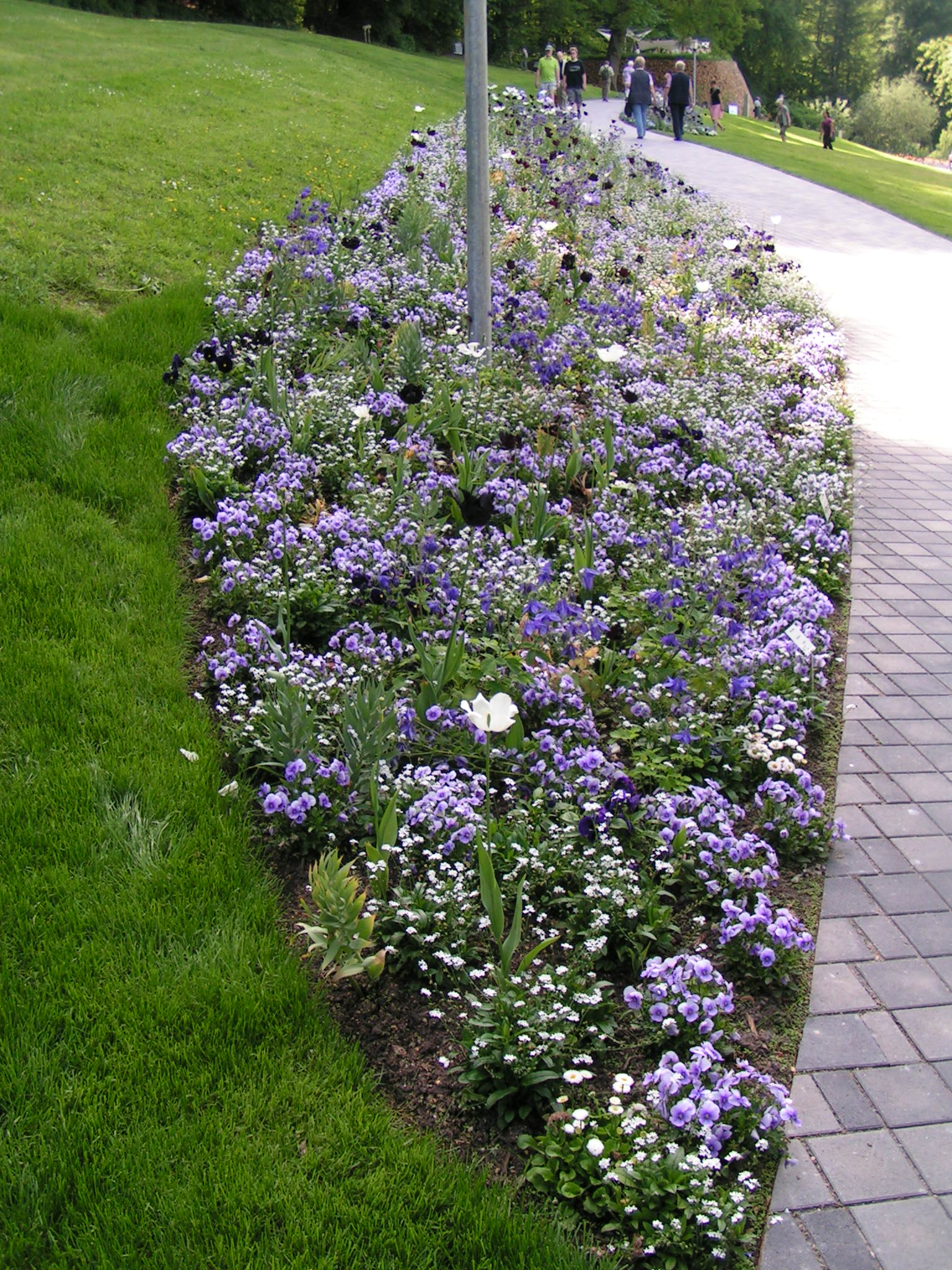
Bad Essen (2010)

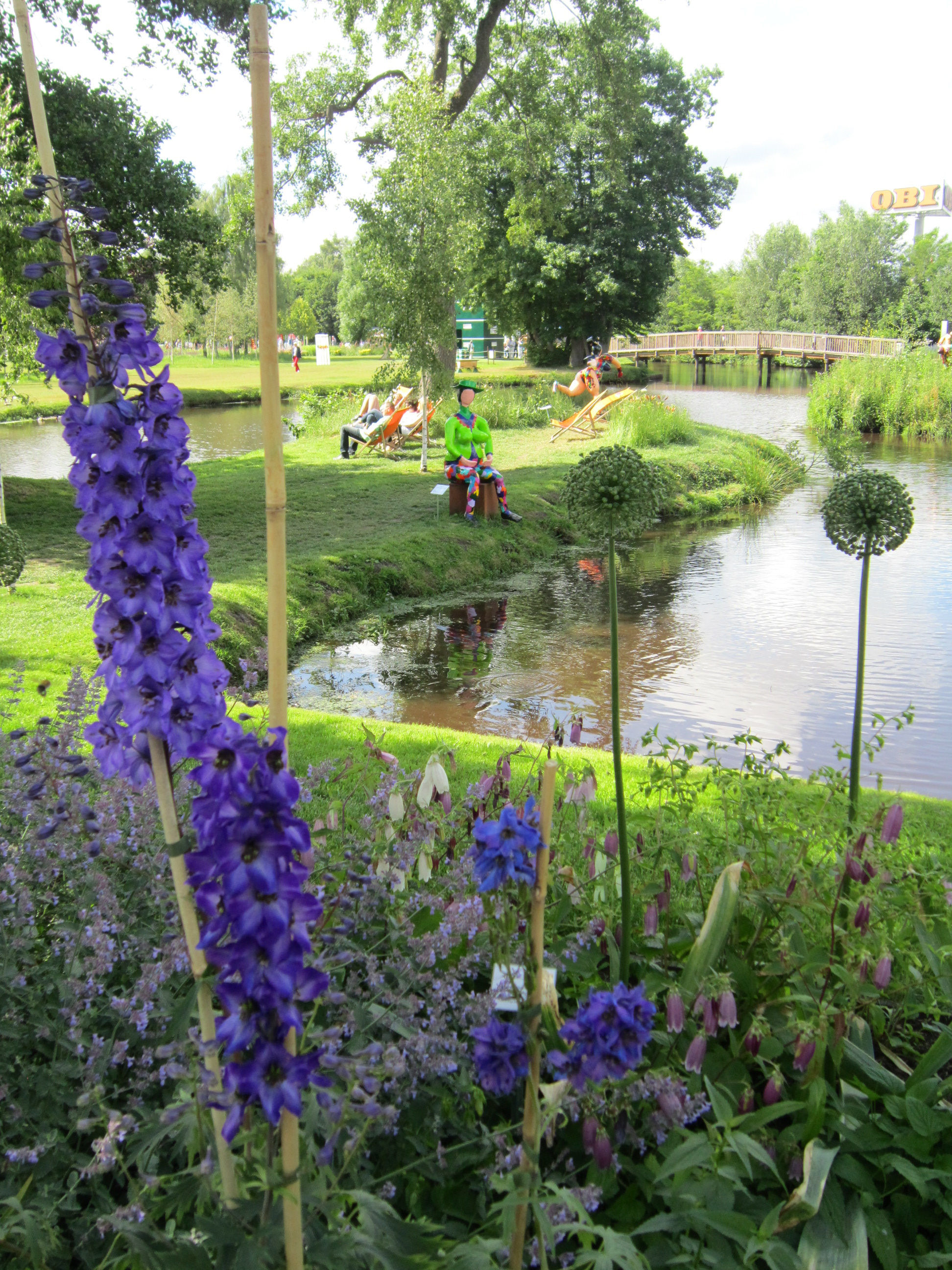
Papenburg (2014)

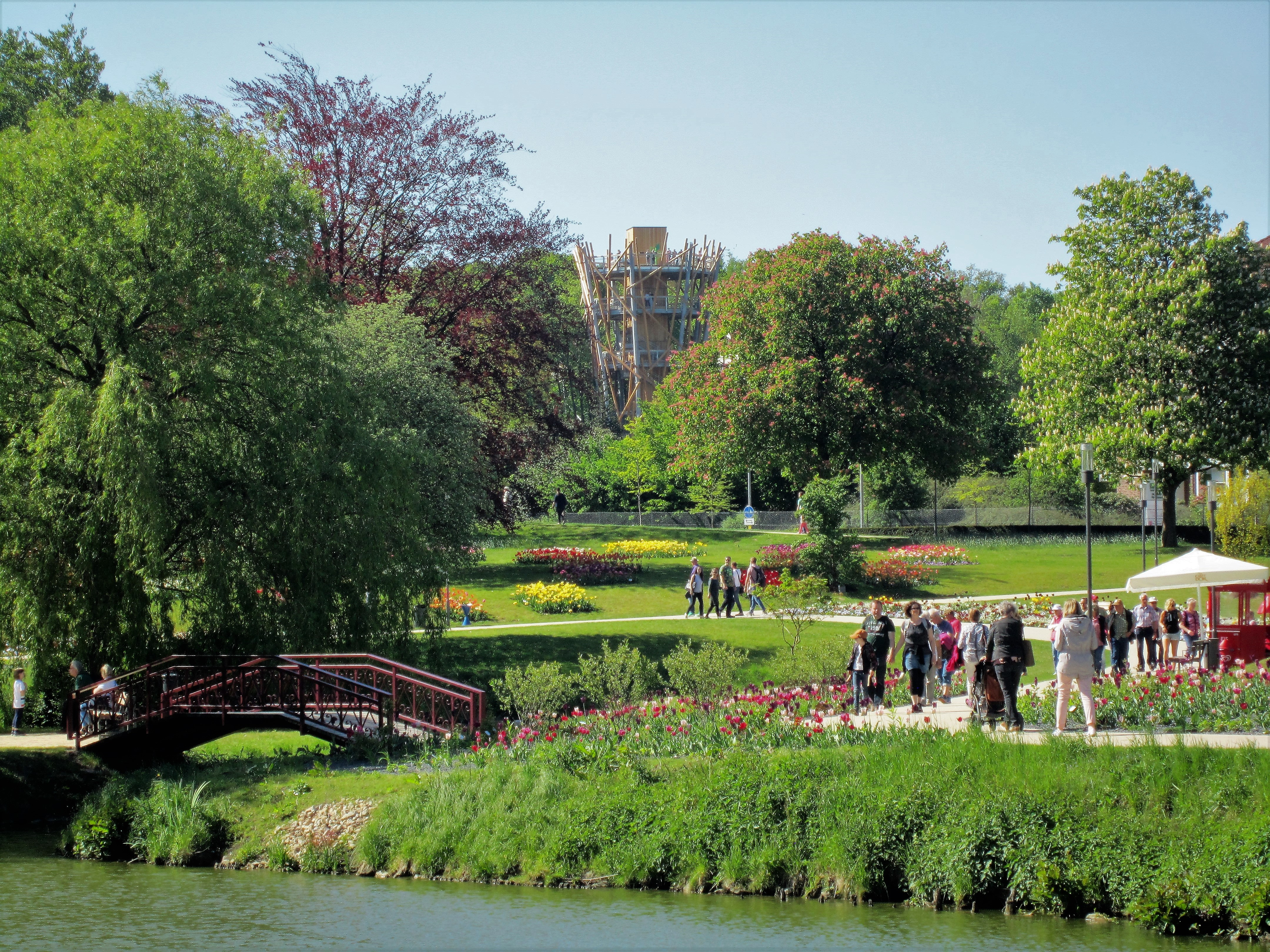
Bad Iburg (2018)

==== North Rhine-Westphalia ====
1. 1970: Grefrath
2. 1972: Mechernich-Kommern, Mühlenpark
3. 1974: Nümbrecht
4. 1980: Xanten, LVR Archaeological Park Xanten
5. 1984: Hamm, Maximilianpark
6. 1988: Rheda-Wiedenbrück, Flora Westfalica
7. 1992: Mülheim an der Ruhr, MüGa-Park
8. 1994: Paderborn, Schloss- und Auenpark
9. 1995: Grevenbroich, Stadtpark
10. 1996: Lünen, „LaGaLü"
11. 1998: Jülich, Brückenkopfpark
12. 1999: Oberhausen, „Olga"
13. 2000: Bad Oeynhausen/Löhne, Aqua Magica
14. 2001: Oelde, „Blütenzauber & Kinderträume", Vier-Jahreszeiten-Park
15. 2002: Düsseldorf, Jüchen, Monheim, Mönchengladbach, Willich, Krefeld
16. 2003: Gronau, Isle park / Losser (NL) – joint garden show with the neighbouring Dutch town
17. 2005: Leverkusen, „Discover new territory", Neuland-Park
18. 2008: Rietberg, „dream things up"
19. 2010: Hemer, „Spell of transformation"
20. 2014: Zülpich, „Zülpich Millennium Gardens - From Roman times to the 21st century"
21. 2017: Bad Lippspringe, „Splendor of flowers & forest idyll"
22. 2020: Kamp-Lintfort
23. 2023: Höxter
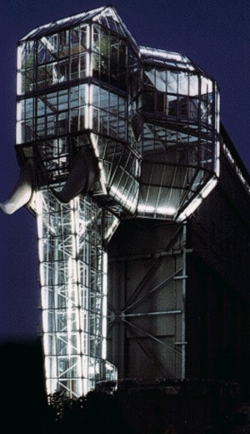
Hamm 1984: Glaselefant in "Maximilianpark"

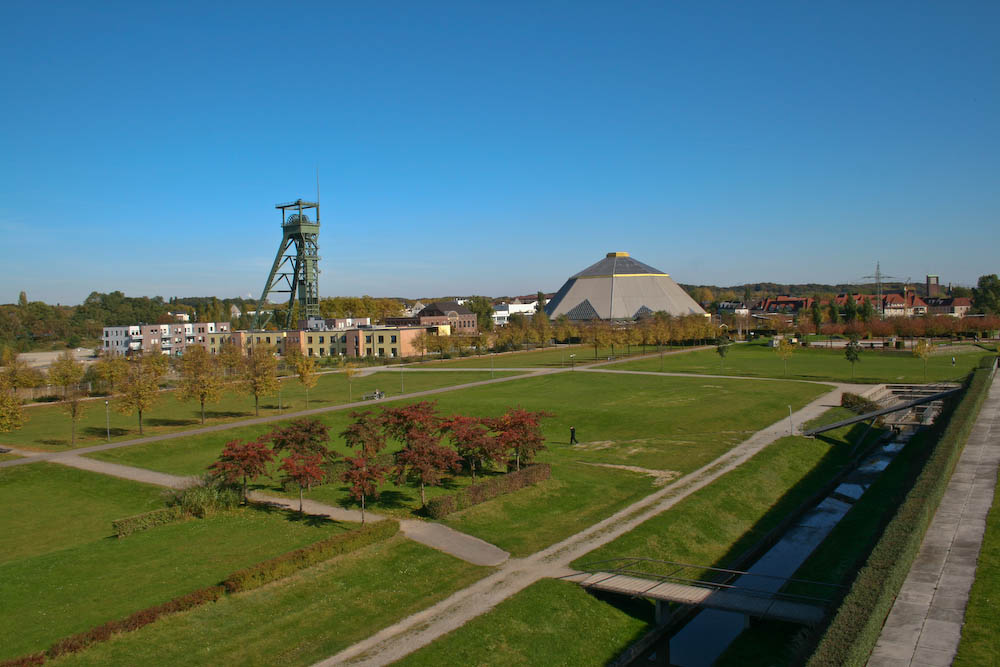
Oberhausen 1999: View over the "Olga" premises

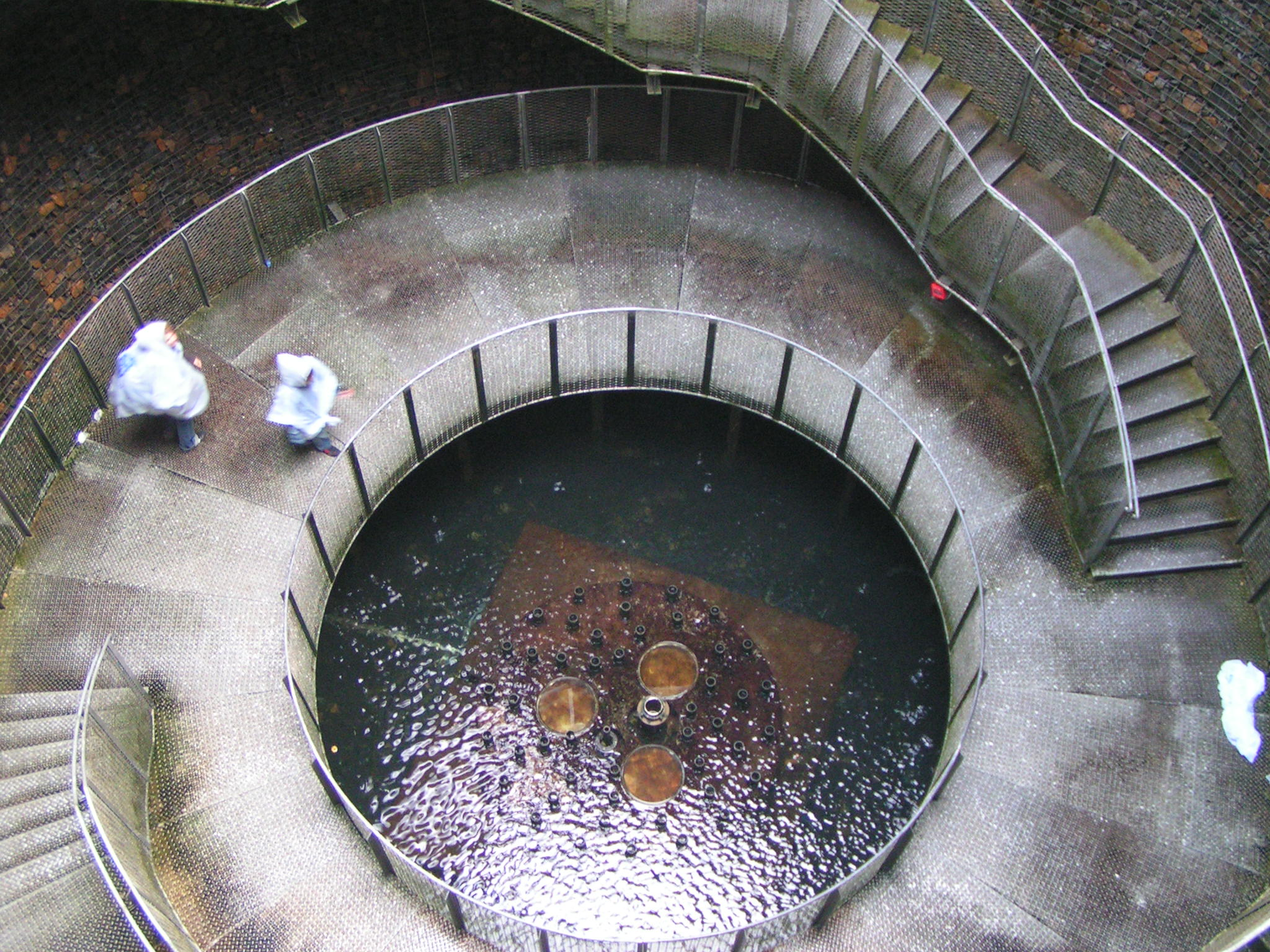
Bad Oeynhausen 2000: Water crater on the "Aqua Magica site

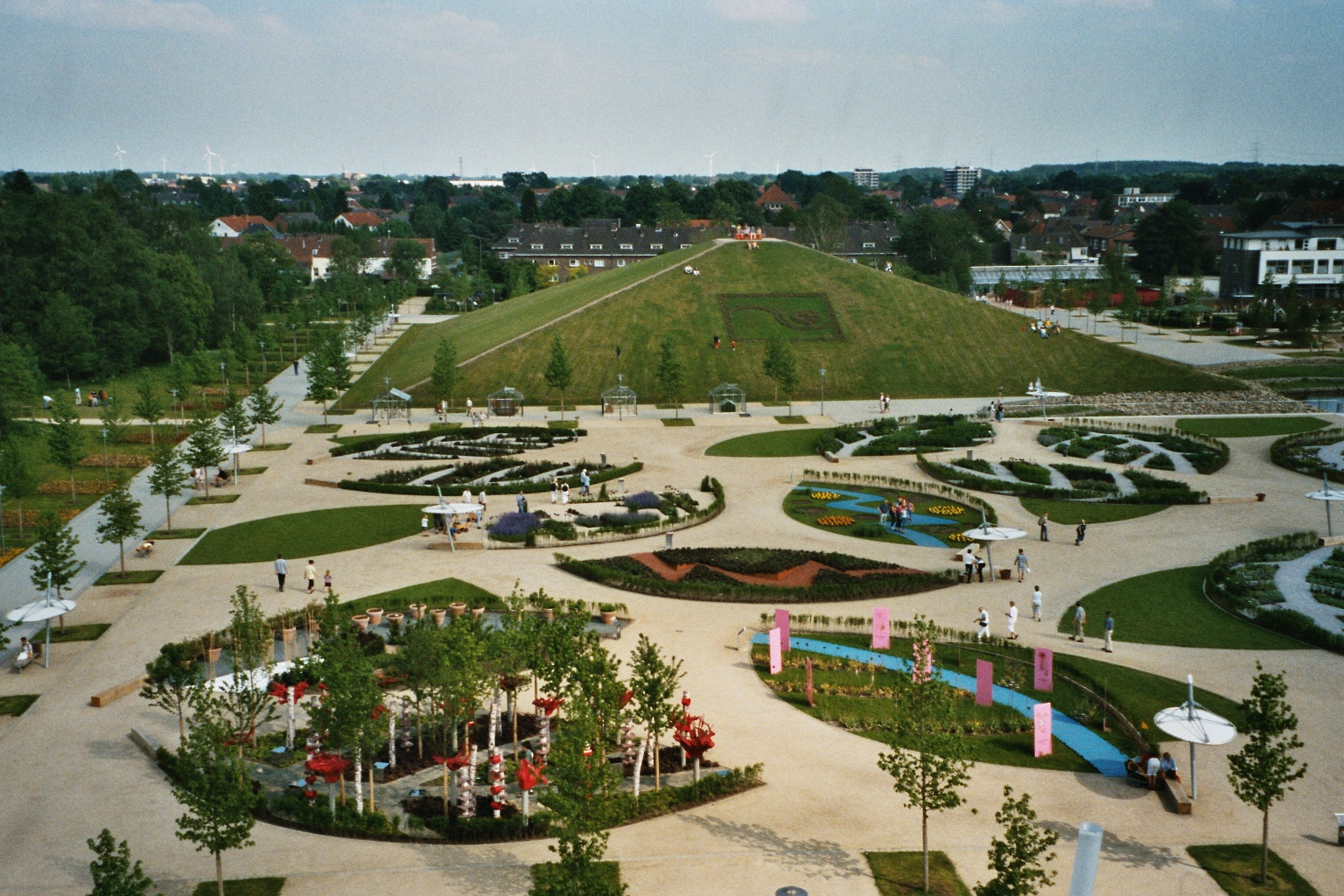
Gronau 2003: View of the state garden show "Inselpark" in Gronau

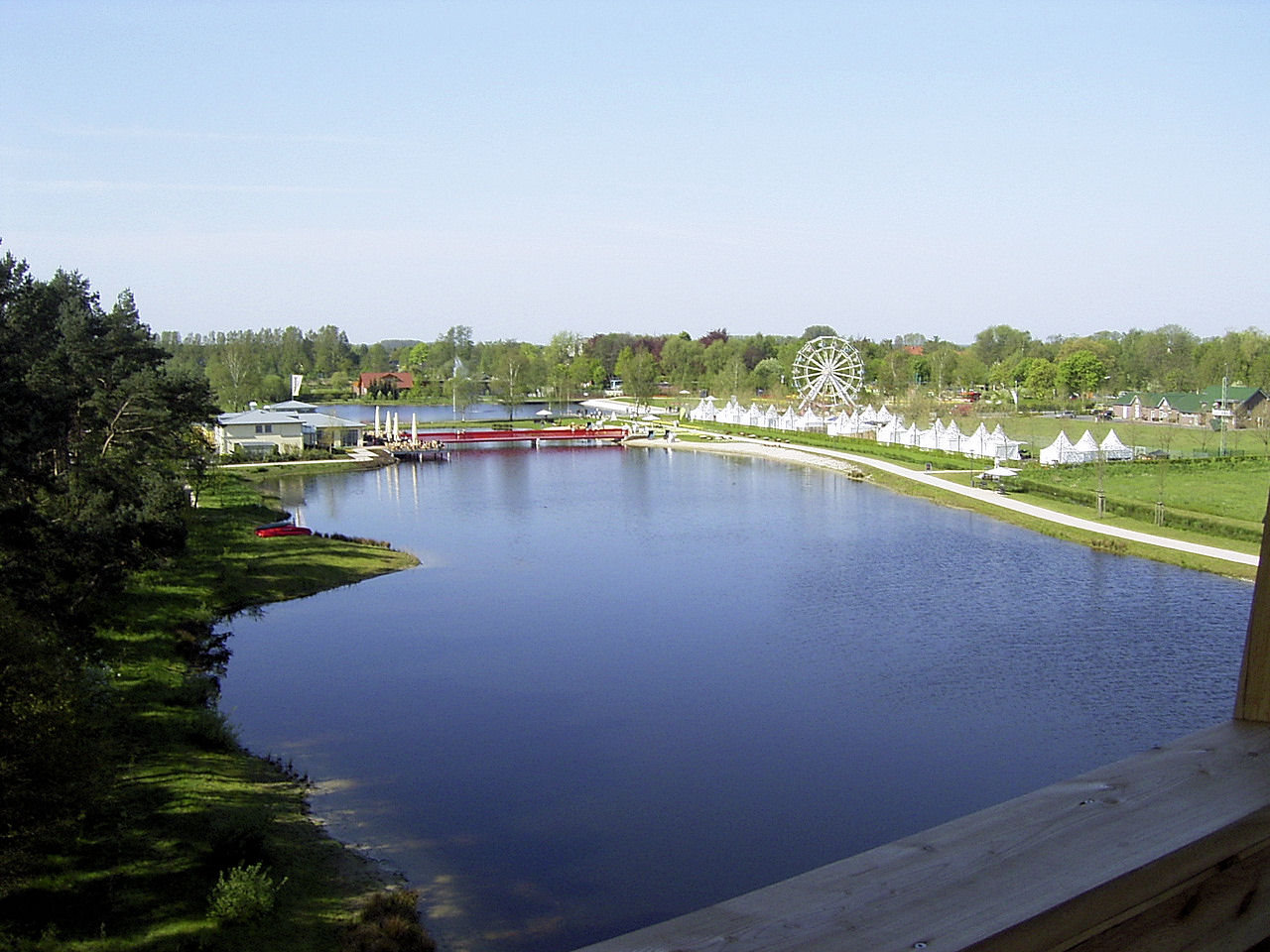
Rietberg 2008: View from the observation tower over the Landesgartenschau "Let dreams grow" in Rietberg

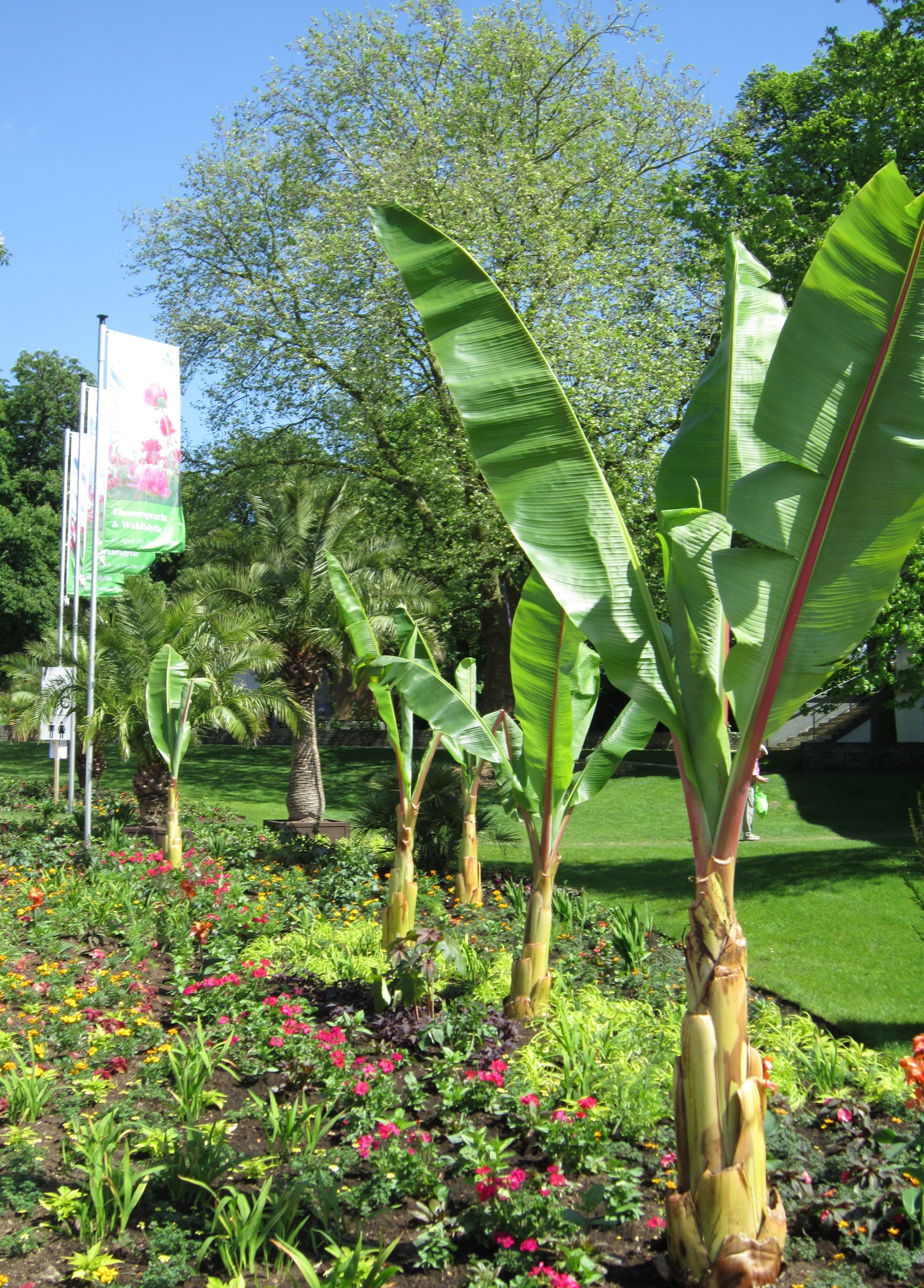
Bad Lippspringe 2017: Banana trees in Arminius Park

==== Rheinland-Pfalz ====
1. 2000: Regional Garden Show Kaiserslautern
2. 2004: Regional Garden Show Trier
3. 2008: Regional Garden Show Bingen am Rhein
4. 2011: State Garden Show Koblenz
5. 2015: Regional Garden Show Landau in der Pfalz (originally planned for 2014, postponed by one year on 30 July 2013 due to numerous dud bombs found during the Second World War)
Regional Garden Shows in Rheinland-Pfalz

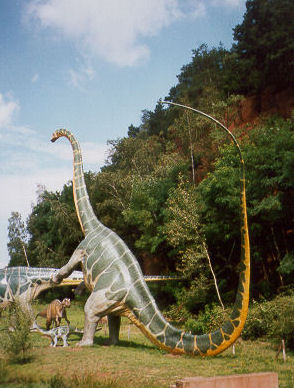
Kaiserslautern 2000: Sculpture „Dinosaur"

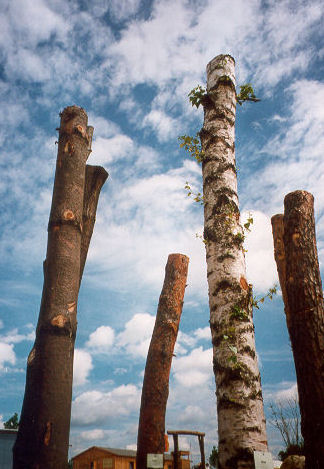
Kaiserslautern 2000: Tree trunks as art object

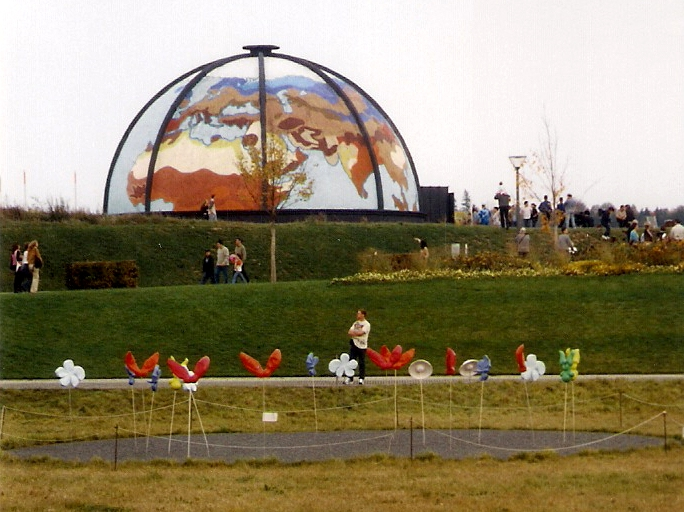
Trier 2004: Sound dome

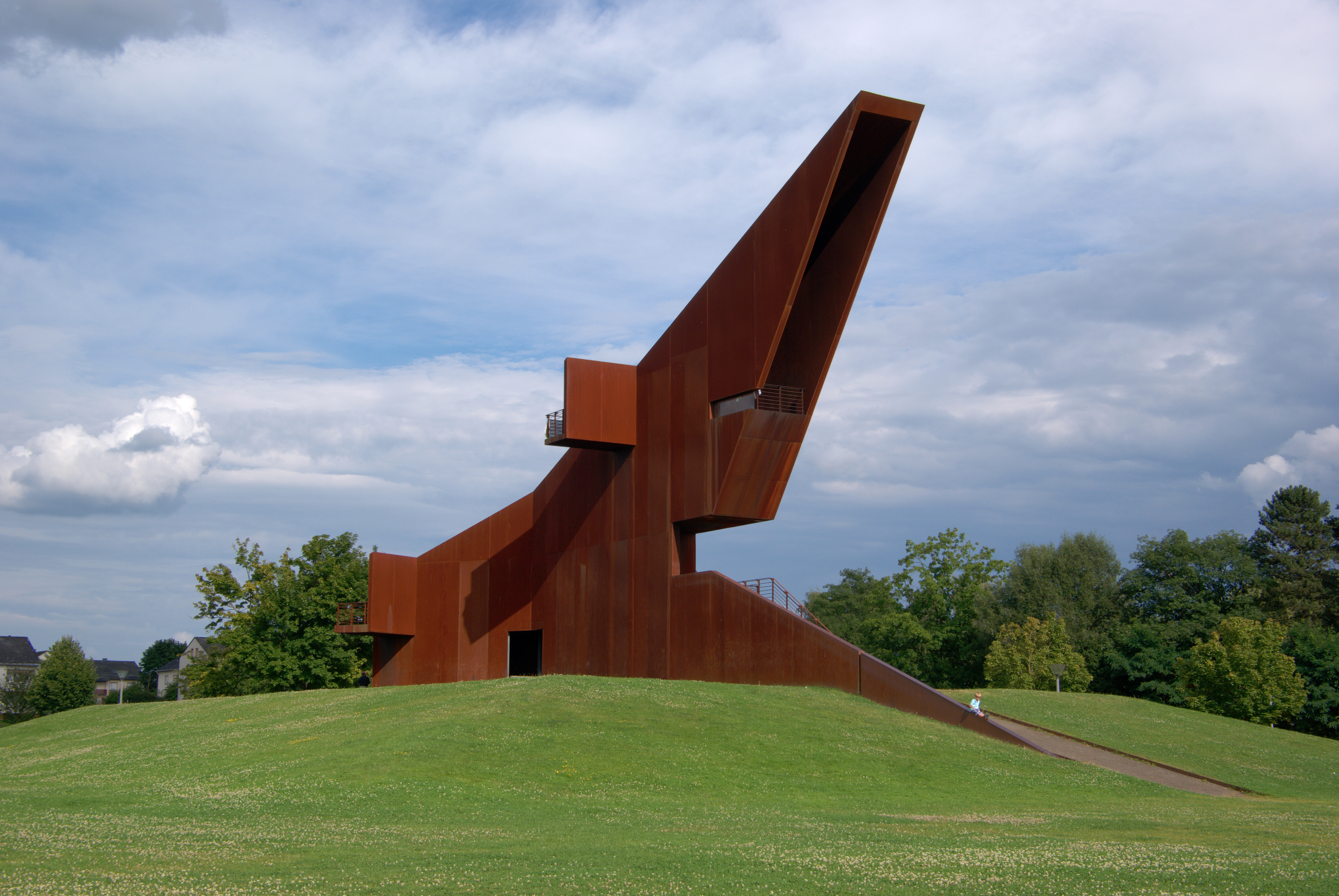
Trier 2004: Tower Luxemburg

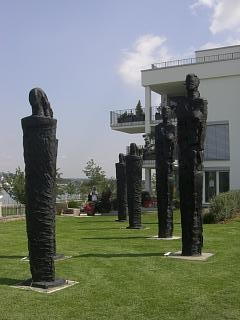
Bingen 2008: Skulptur „Grandi Figuri Verticali"

==== Sachsen ====
1. 1996: Lichtenstein
2. 1999: Zittau and Olbersdorf
3. 2002: Großenhain
4. 2006: Oschatz
5. 2009: Reichenbach im Vogtland
6. 2012: Löbau
7. 2015: Oelsnitz, Erzgebirge, „Blütenträume – Lebensräume"
8. 2019: Frankenberg, „Natürlich mittendrin"
9. 2022: Torgau

==== Sachsen-Anhalt ====
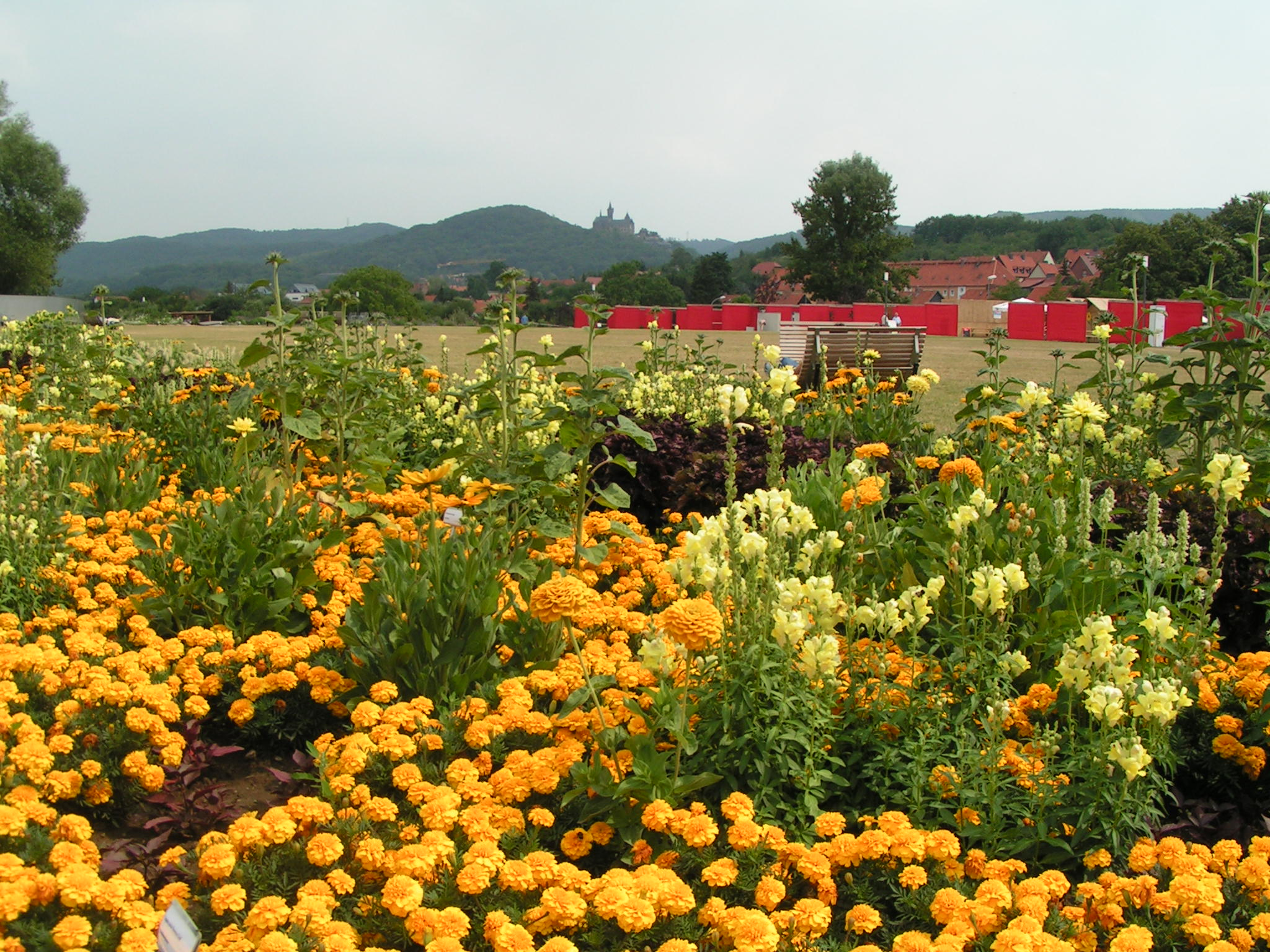
Wernigerode 2006

1. 2004: Zeitz
2. 2006: Wernigerode, see also Little Harz
3. 2010: Aschersleben, „Nature finds town"
4. 2018: Burg

==== Schleswig-Holstein ====
1. 2008: Schleswig-Königswiesen
2. 2011: Norderstedt, „dreifach einmalig"
3. 2016: Eutin, „Eins werden mit der Natur"
4. 2020: a "cross-border garden show" is planned in Flensburg and Sonderburg on the occasion of the 100th anniversary of the referendum in Schleswig
Landesgartenschau 2008 in Schleswig

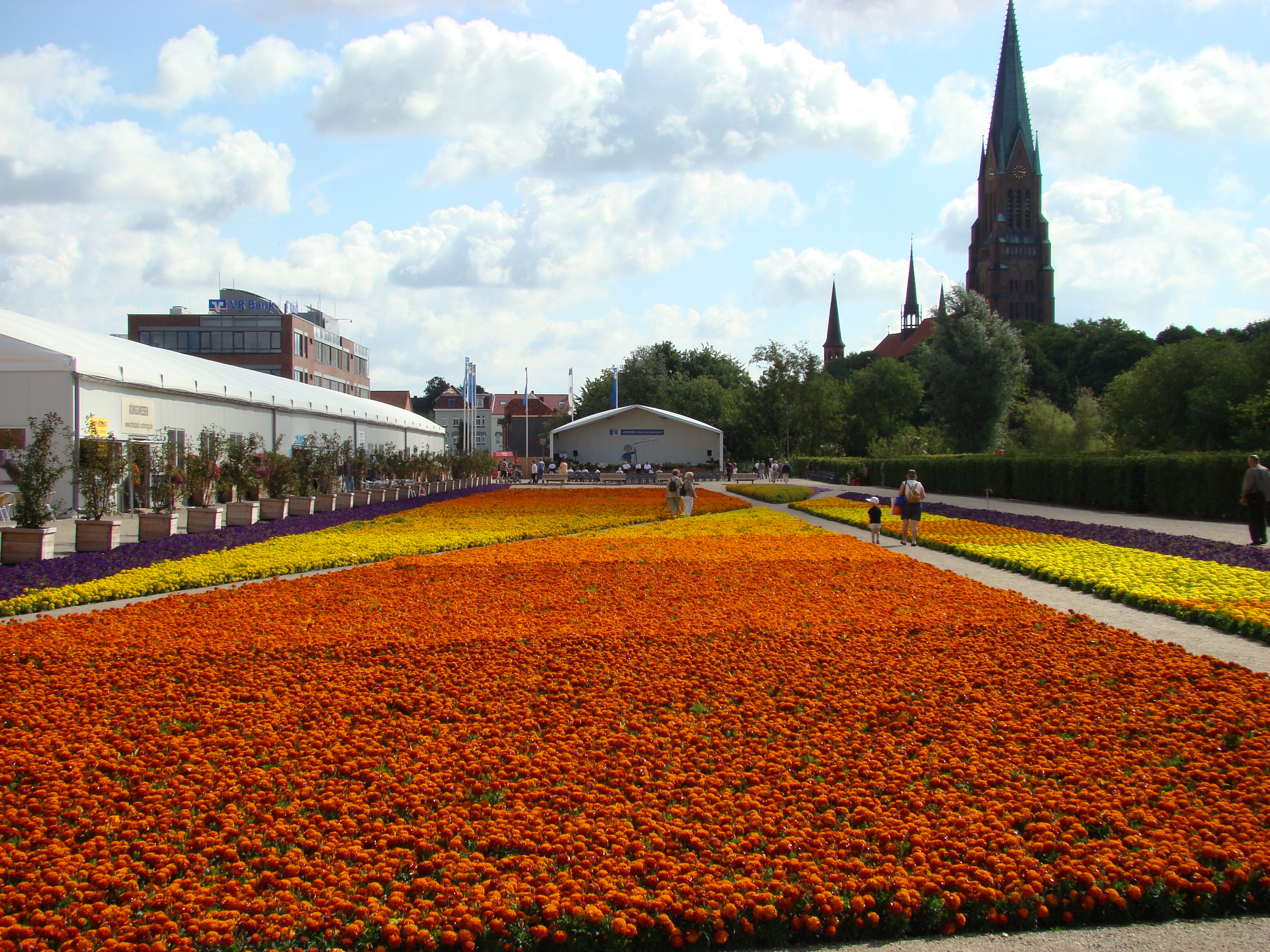

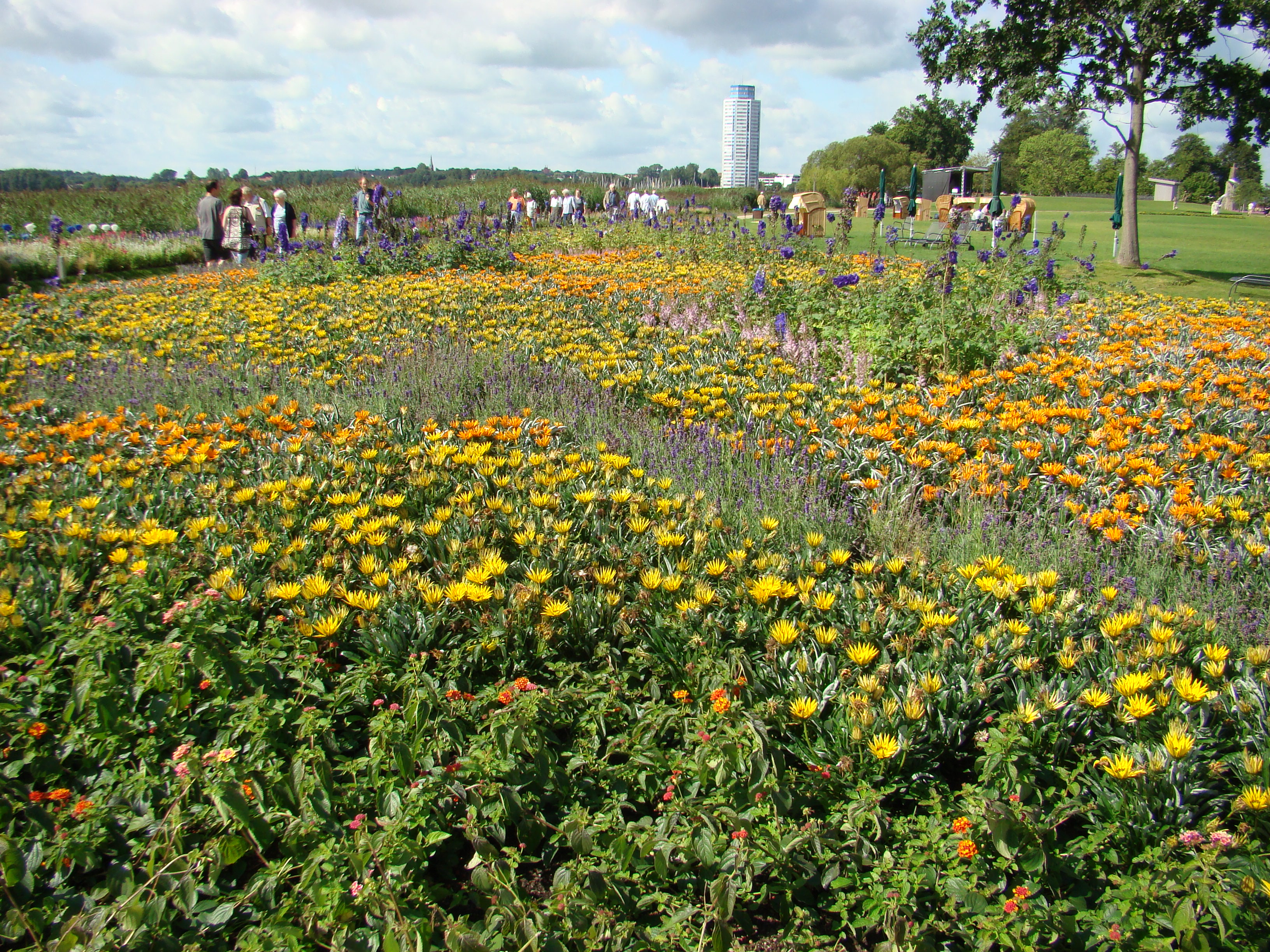

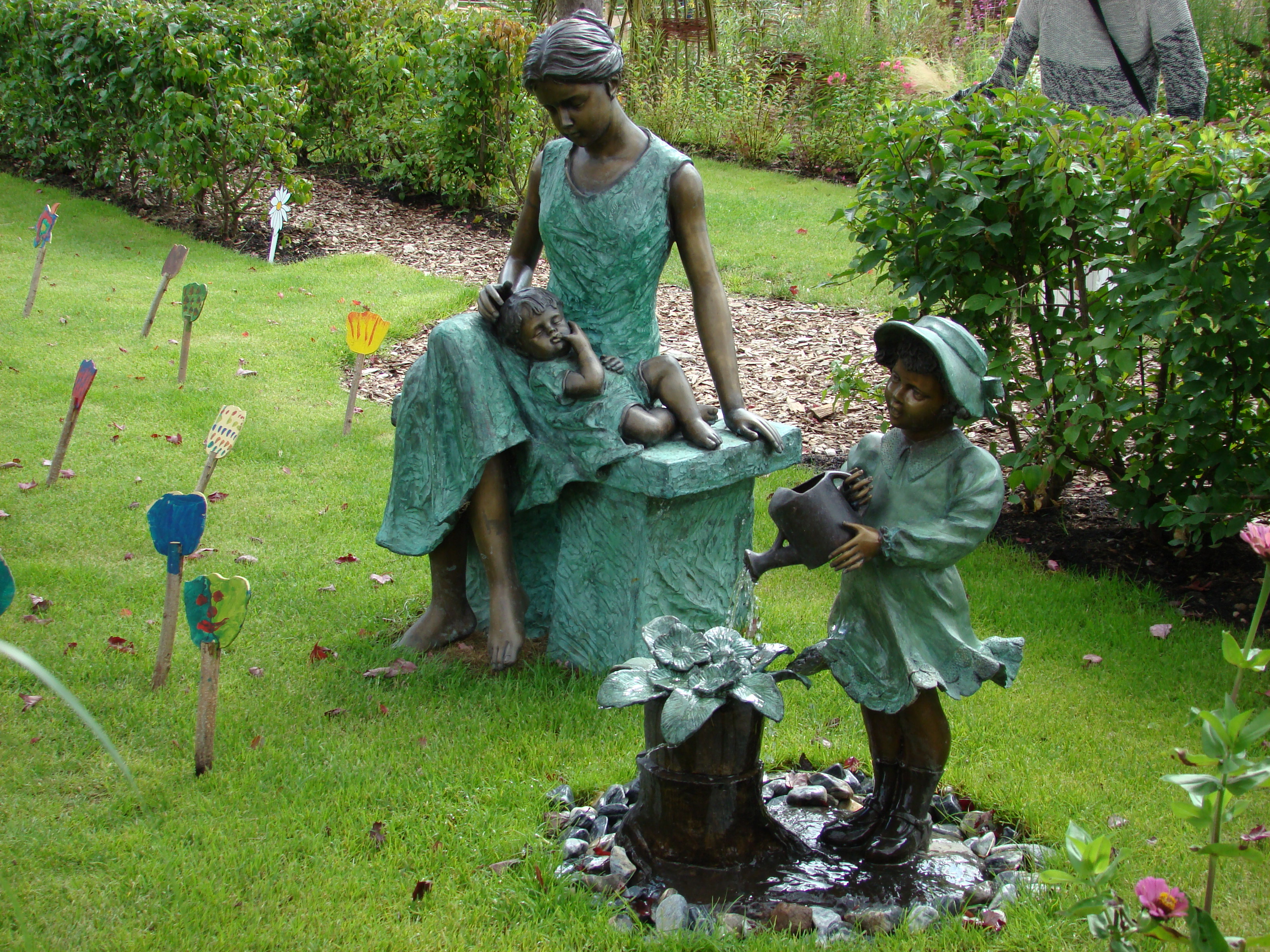

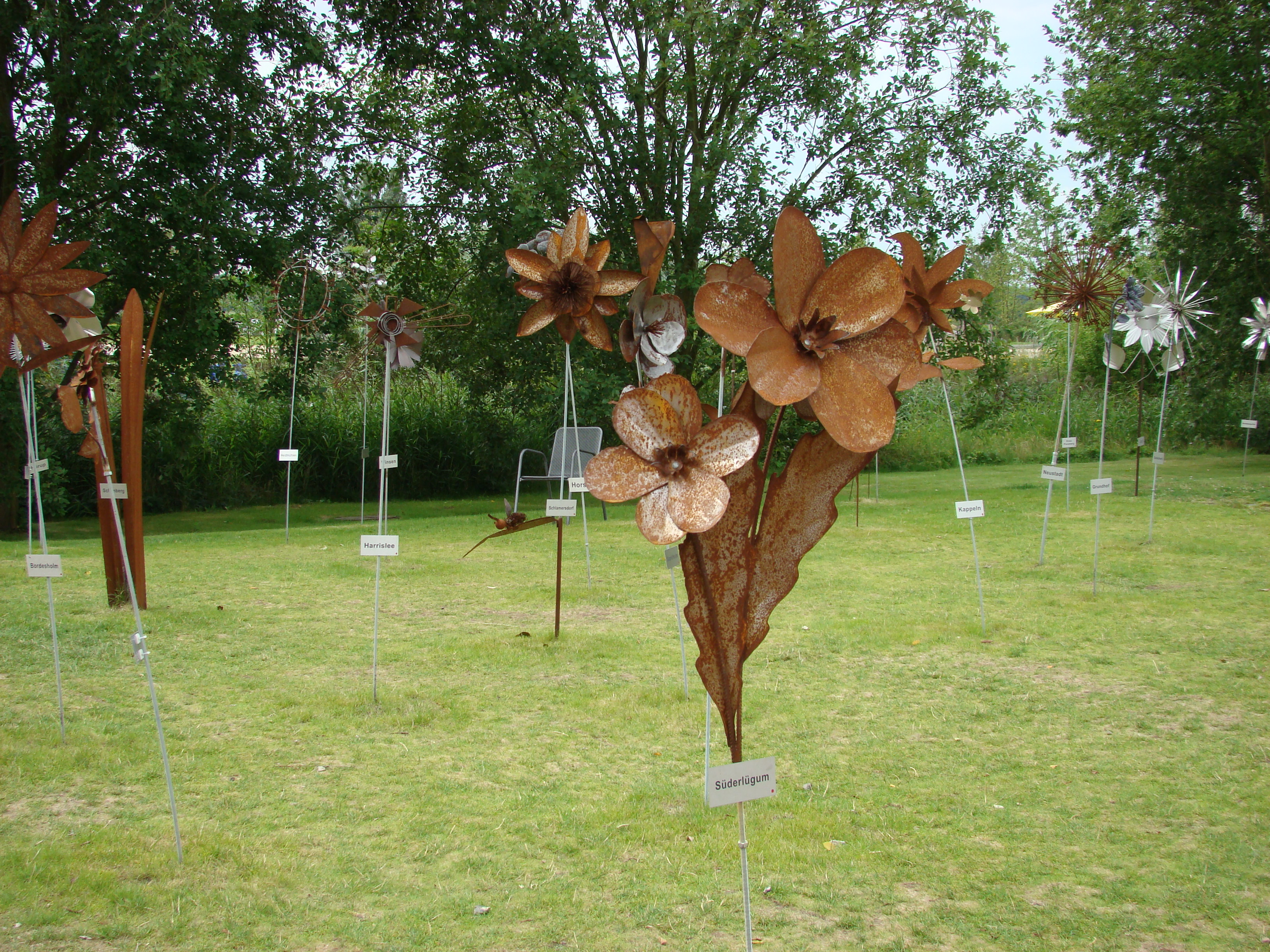

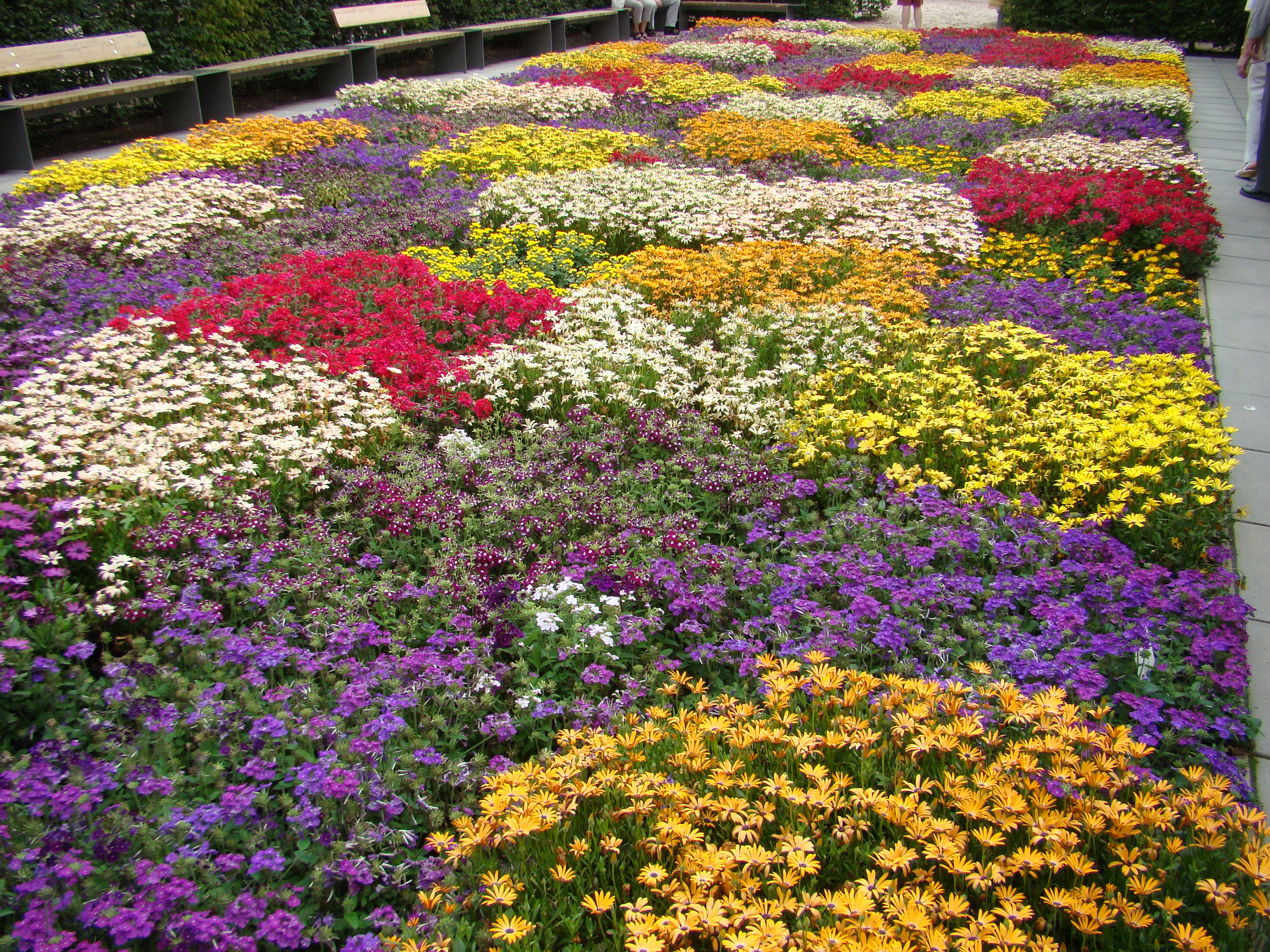

==== Thüringen ====
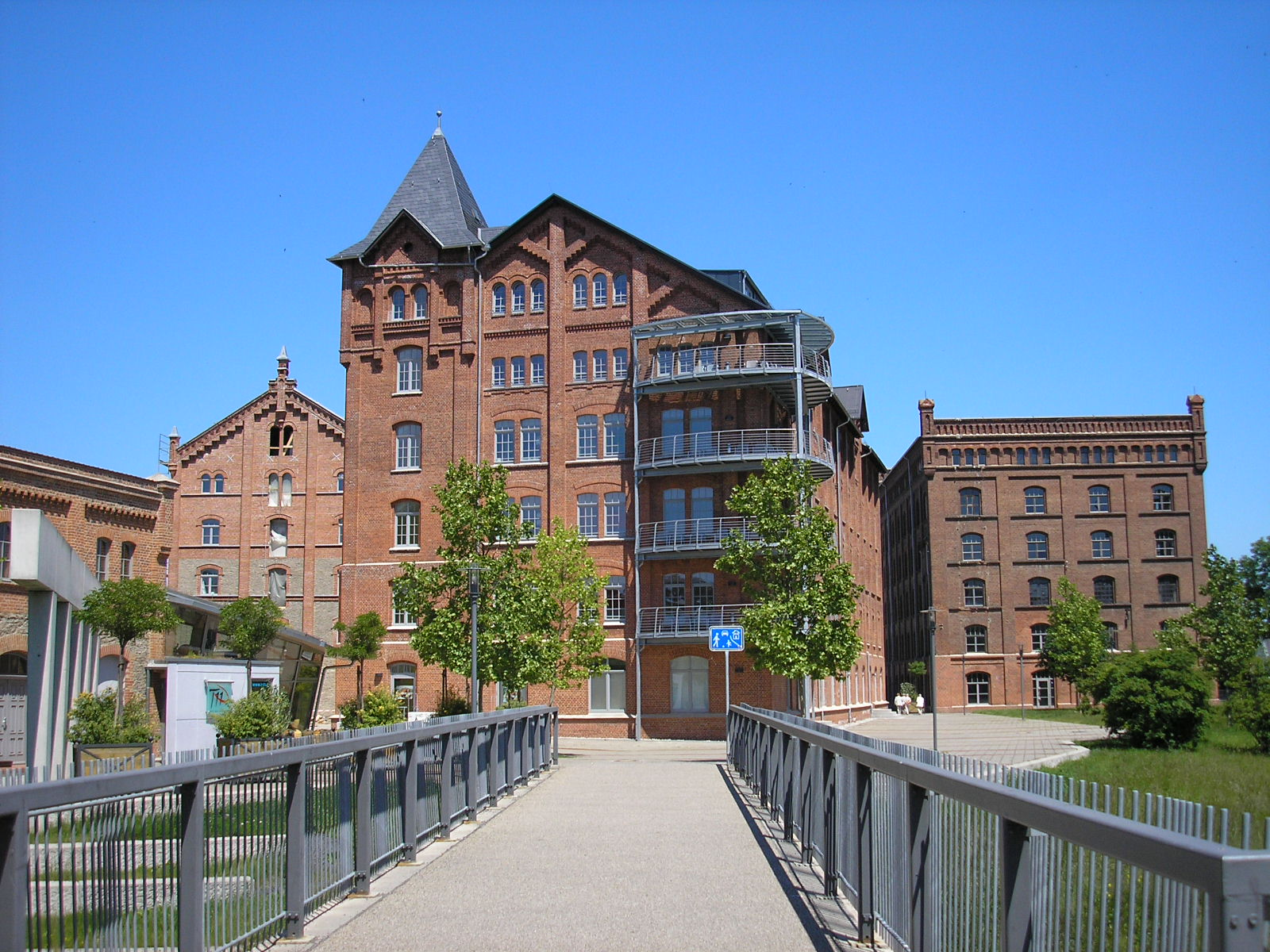
Pößneck 2000: Renovated industrial area in Pößneck

1. 2000: Pößneck
2. 2004: Nordhausen, „The new middle"
3. 2015: Schmalkalden, „Gardentimetravel"
4. 2017: Apolda, „Flowering time Apolda"
5. 2024: Leinefelde-Worbis, „Reconciliation between town and countryside"

== Austria ==
=== Upper Austria ===
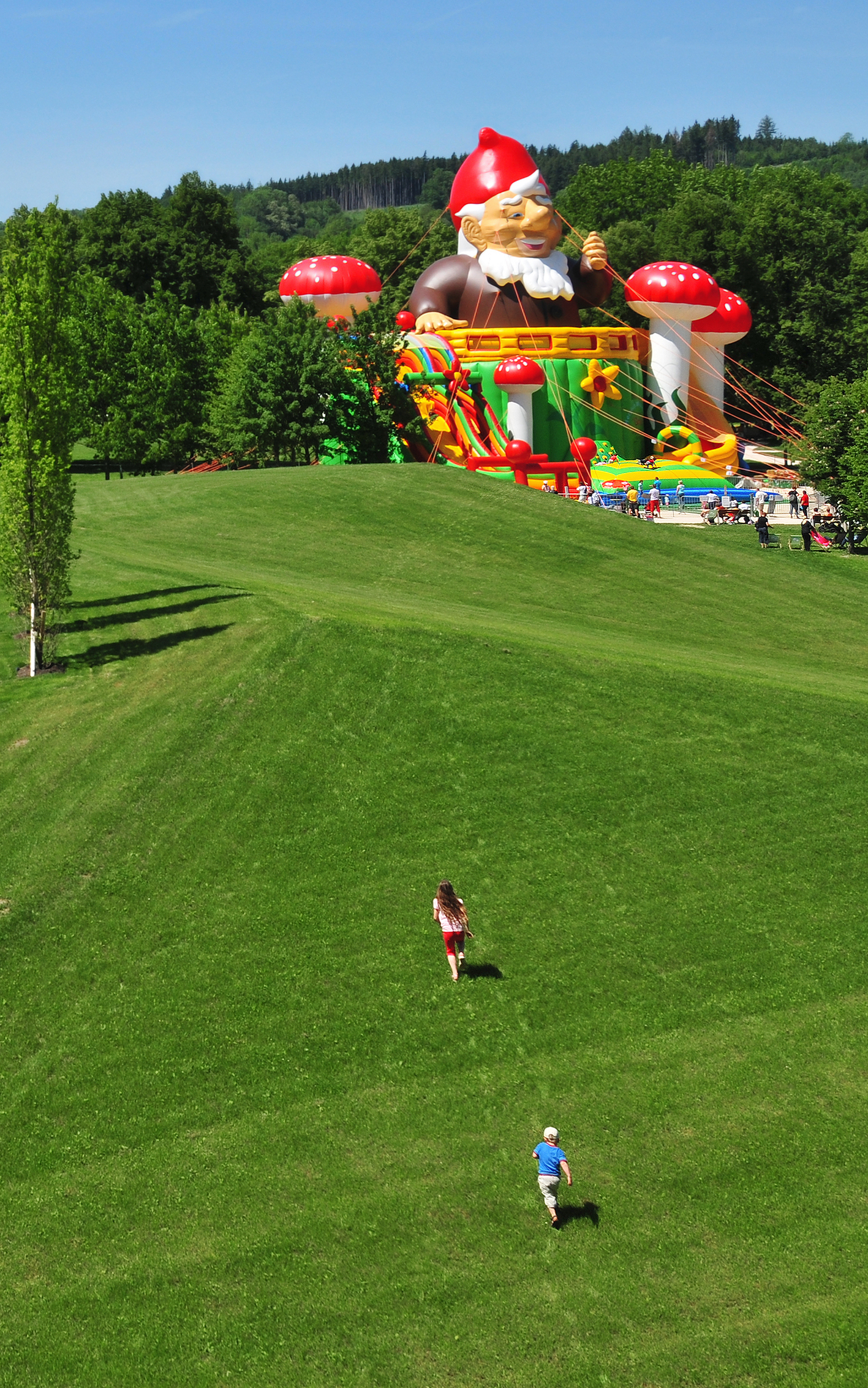
Bouncy castle "Grasi" at the Upper Austrian Regional Garden Show "Botanica" 2009 in Bad Schallerbach

- 1997: Krenglbach
- 1999: Gmunden
- 2005: Bad Hall
- 2007: Vöcklabruck
- 2009: Bad Schallerbach
- 2011: Ansfelden
- 2015: Bad Ischl
- 2017: Kremsmünster
- 2019: Schlägl
- 2021: Wilhering
- 2023: Wolfsegg am Hausruck
- 2025: Schärding

=== Lower Austria ===
- 2006: Kamptal
- 2008: Garten Tulln and Castle Park Grafenegg
- 2012: Wachau

== See also ==
- Bundesgartenschau
