= Neuhaus =

Neuhaus (German for "new house") may refer to:

== Places ==
- in Germany:
  - in Bavaria:
    - Neuhaus an der Pegnitz, in the district Nürnberger Land
    - Neuhaus am Inn, in the district of Passau
  - in Lower Saxony:
    - Amt Neuhaus, in the district of Lüneburg
    - Neuhaus (Oste), in the district of Cuxhaven
  - in North Rhine-Westphalia:
    - until 10 September 1957 the name of Neuhaus Castle, Paderborn, in Paderborn
  - in Thuringia:
    - Neuhaus am Rennweg, in the district of Sonneberg
    - Neuhaus-Schierschnitz, in the district of Sonneberg
  - in Saarland:
- in Austria:
  - Neuhaus, Carinthia, in the district of Völkermarkt, Carinthia
  - Neuhaus am Klausenbach, in the district of Jennersdorf, Burgenland
- in Switzerland:
  - Neuhaus, Bern, in the municipality of Unterseen in the canton of Bern
  - Neuhaus, Fribourg, in the canton of Fribourg
  - Neuhaus, St. Gallen, a hamlet of Eschenbach in the canton of St. Gallen
- in the Czech Republic:
  - Jindřichův Hradec (in German: Neuhaus), in the district of Jindřichův Hradec, South Bohemian Region

== Other uses ==
- Neuhaus (surname)
- Chocolatier Neuhaus
- Lodge Neuhaus 946
  - is a Masonic Lodge which meets in Paderborn and is part of the Grand Lodge of British Freemasons in Germany.

== See also ==
- Neuhausen (disambiguation)
- Neuhauser (disambiguation)
- Newhouse (disambiguation)
