= Newhouse =

Newhouse or New House may refer to:

== Places ==
United Kingdom

- New House, County Durham, England
- Newhouse, North Lanarkshire, Scotland

United States

- Newhouse, Minnesota, an unincorporated community
- Newhouse, Utah, a ghost town

== Other uses ==
- Newhouse Academy
- Newhouse (surname)

== See also ==
- S. I. Newhouse School of Public Communications
- Mitzi E. Newhouse Theater
- Newhouse News refers to the Advance Publications family of news publications
- Several of MicroProse's Formula One racing games in the late 1990s replaced 1997 Formula One World Champion Jacques Villeneuve with the fictional John Newhouse (an approximate translation of his name), as licensing restrictions prevented his name from being used
- Neuhaus (disambiguation)
