= Reichenau =

Reichenau may refer to:

- Reichenau Island, a German island in Lake Constance
  - Reichenau Abbey, a former Benedictine monastery on the island
  - Reichenau, Baden-Württemberg, a municipality that encompasses the namesake island and five separate areas on the mainland
  - Reichenau (Baden) station, situated on the High Rhine railway line
- Reichenau, Switzerland, part of the municipality Tamins, in Grisons, Switzerland
  - Reichenau-Tamins railway station, a nodal railway station
- Reichenau, Carinthia, a municipality in Carinthia, Austria
- Reichenau an der Rax, a municipality in Lower Austria, Austria
- Reichenau im Mühlkreis, a municipality in Upper Austria, Austria
- The Polish town of Bogatynia, historically named Reichenau in German
- The Polish village of Topola, Lower Silesian Voivodeship, historically named Reichenau in German
- The Polish town of Tuczno in Gmina Pobiedziska, within Poznań County, Greater Poland Voivodeship, historically named Reichenau in German
- The Czech town of Rychnov u Jablonce nad Nisou, historically named Reichenau in German
- The Czech town of Rychnov nad Kněžnou, historically named Reichenau an der Knieschna in German
- The Czech town of Rychnov na Moravě, historically named Reichenau in German
- The Gottschee village of Rajhenav, known as Reichenau in German

== People with the surname ==
- Hermann of Reichenau, 11th century scholar, composer, music theorist, mathematician, historian, and astronomer
- Walther von Reichenau, a World War II German field marshal
