= Rychnov =

Rychnov may refer to places in the Czech Republic:

- Rychnov, a village and part of Krouna in the Pardubice Region
- Rychnov, a village and part of Verneřice in the Ústí nad Labem Region
- Rychnov na Moravě, a municipality and village in the Pardubice Region
- Rychnov nad Kněžnou, a town in the Hradec Králové Region
  - Rychnov nad Kněžnou District, a district around the town
- Rychnov nad Malší, a village and part of Dolní Dvořiště in the South Bohemian Region
- Rychnov u Jablonce nad Nisou, a town in the Liberec Region
- Rychnov u Nových Hradů, a village and part of Dolní Dvořiště in the South Bohemian Region
- Dolní Rychnov, a municipality and village in the Karlovy Vary Region
- Nový Rychnov, a market town in the Vysočina Region

== See also ==
- Reichenau (disambiguation)
