= Triboltingen =

Coordinates: 47.660°N 9.111°E

- Municipality
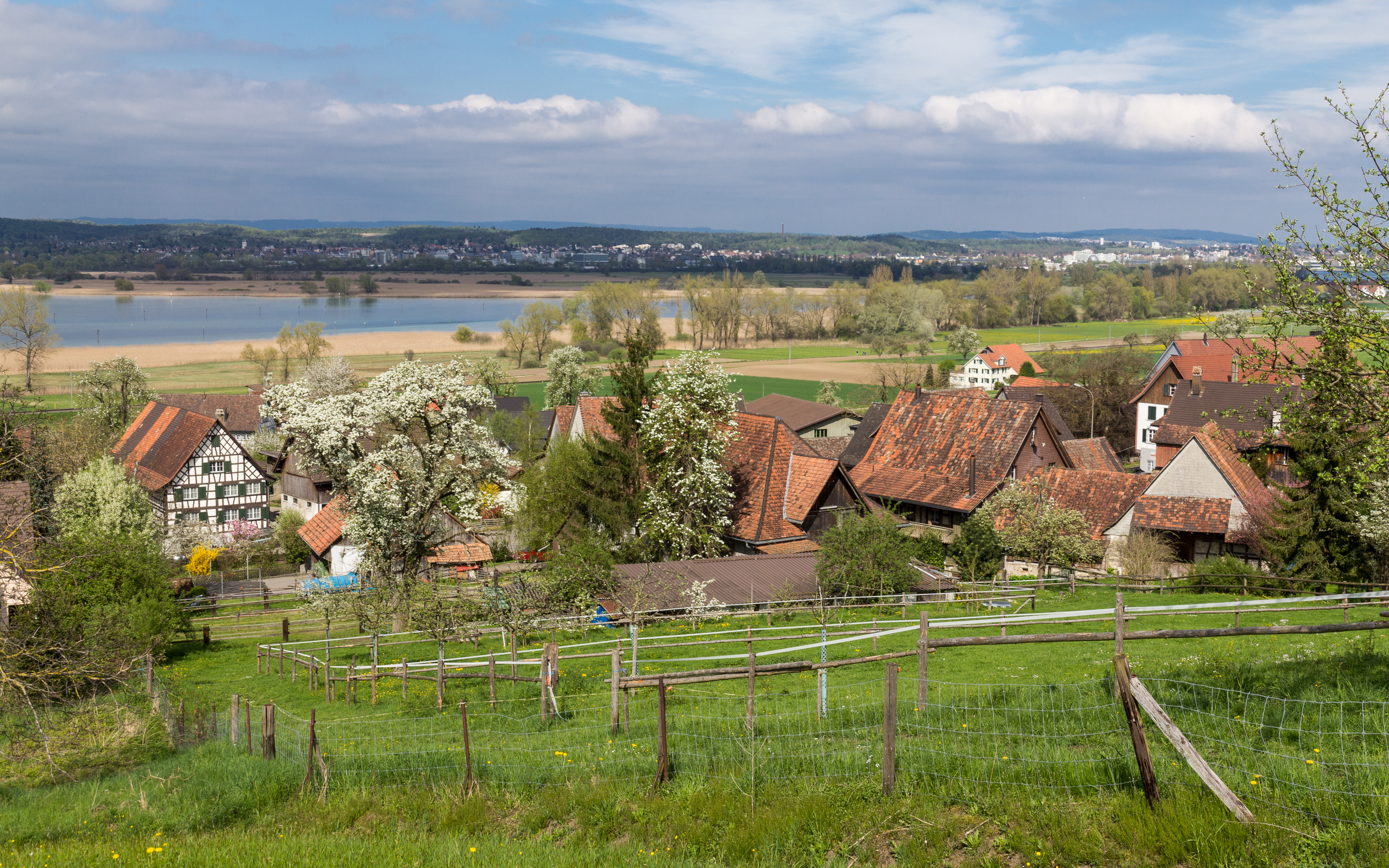

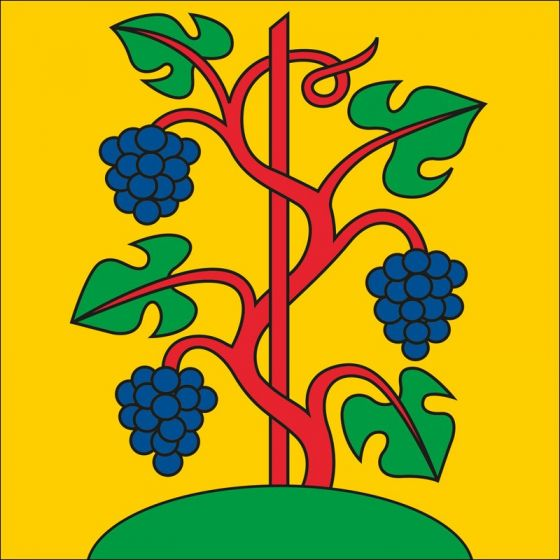
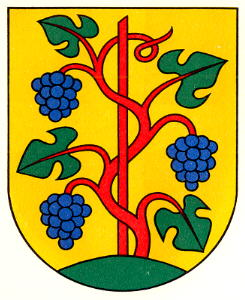
- Flag Coat of arms
- Location of Triboltingen
- Location within Switzerland Location within Canton of Thurgau
- Country: Switzerland
- Canton: Thurgau
- District: Kreuzlingen

Area
  - Total: 2.74 km^{2} (1.06 sq mi)
- Elevation: 416 m (1,365 ft)

Population (December 2018)
  - Total: 442
  - Density: 161/km^{2} (418/sq mi)
- Time zone: UTC+01:00 (CET)
  - Summer (DST): UTC+02:00 (CEST)
- Postal code: 8273
- SFOS number: 4647
- ISO 3166 code: CH-TG
- Surrounded by: Constance (Konstanz) (DE-BW), Ermatingen, Gottlieben, Kemmental, Kreuzlingen, Reichenau (DE-BW), Tägerwilen, Wäldi
- Website: www.ermatingen.ch

Triboltingen is a small village in the canton of Thurgau in Switzerland, situated on the south shore of the Untersee part of Lake Constance. Since 1975, it is politically part of Ermatingen.

Triboltingen railway station on the Lake Line is served by the S1 of St. Gallen S-Bahn.
