= Ermatingen =

- Municipality
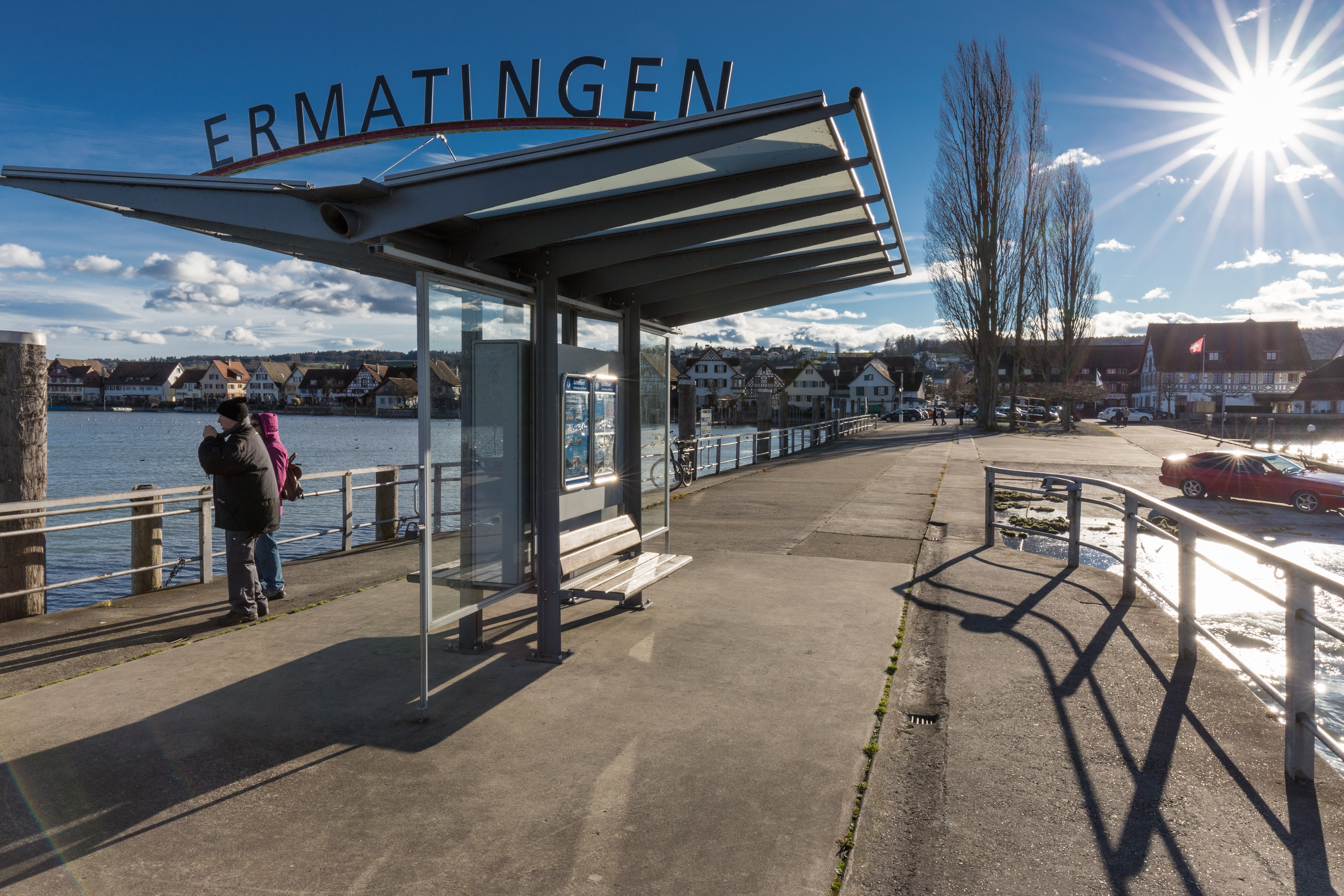
- Ermatingen village

- Coat of arms
- Location of Ermatingen
- Location within Switzerland Location within Canton of Thurgau
- Coordinates: 47°40′N 9°4′E
- Country: Switzerland
- Canton: Thurgau
- District: Kreuzlingen

Area
  - Total: 10.4 km^{2} (4.0 sq mi)
- Elevation: 400 m (1,300 ft)

Population (December 2007)
  - Total: 2,705
  - Density: 260/km^{2} (674/sq mi)
- Time zone: UTC+01:00 (CET)
  - Summer (DST): UTC+02:00 (CEST)
- Postal code: 8272
- SFOS number: 4646
- ISO 3166 code: CH-TG
- Surrounded by: Constance (Konstanz) (DE-BW), Gottlieben, Raperswilen, Reichenau (DE-BW), Salenstein, Tägerwilen, Wäldi
- Website: www.ermatingen.ch

Ermatingen is a municipality in the district of Kreuzlingen in the canton of Thurgau in Switzerland.

== History ==
The Stone Age Westerfeld and Büge shoreline settlements were discovered in 1861 and studied extensively 1981-83, with finds from the Pfyn, Horgen and Corded Ware cultures (4000-2500 BC.) An Alamanni graveyard has also been found outside the early medieval village.

The village of Ermatingen is first mentioned in 724 as Erfmotingas. It was part of the land owned by the monastery of Reichenau, and the abbot was the landlord, judge and appointed the priest for the village. The low court in the village was administered by a monastery appointed Meier. The position of Meier and the associated bailiwick were often used as security for a loan, for example in 1446 to the Lords of Klingenberg. In the 13th century and 1518 openings are occupied.

Aerial view (1962)

In the Swabian War of 1499 the village was destroyed. By the 16th century, Ermatingen was on the way to becoming a town, with a high and low council, a court and various privileges. In 1660 the town was granted market rights. After the incorporation of the Abbey of Reichenau into the diocese of Constance in 1540, the lower court rights were held by the Bishop, until 1798.

The parish originally ran by the lake to the Seerücken mountains, and in the High Middle Ages included Mannenbach and Triboltingen. The church of Ermatingen was built in 1359 and was incorporated into the Abbey of Reichenau. In 1528 it turned to the Protestant Reformation. This meant that the Catholic Abbey (and after 1540 the Catholic Bishop of Constance) had the right to appoint the town priest in the mainly Reformed parish. This situation remained until 1804, when the town acquired the right to appoint their priest. The town church became a shared church in 1546. In 1723/24 Wäldi separated from the Reformed parish, as did Gunterswil and Hohrain Wäldi in 1949.

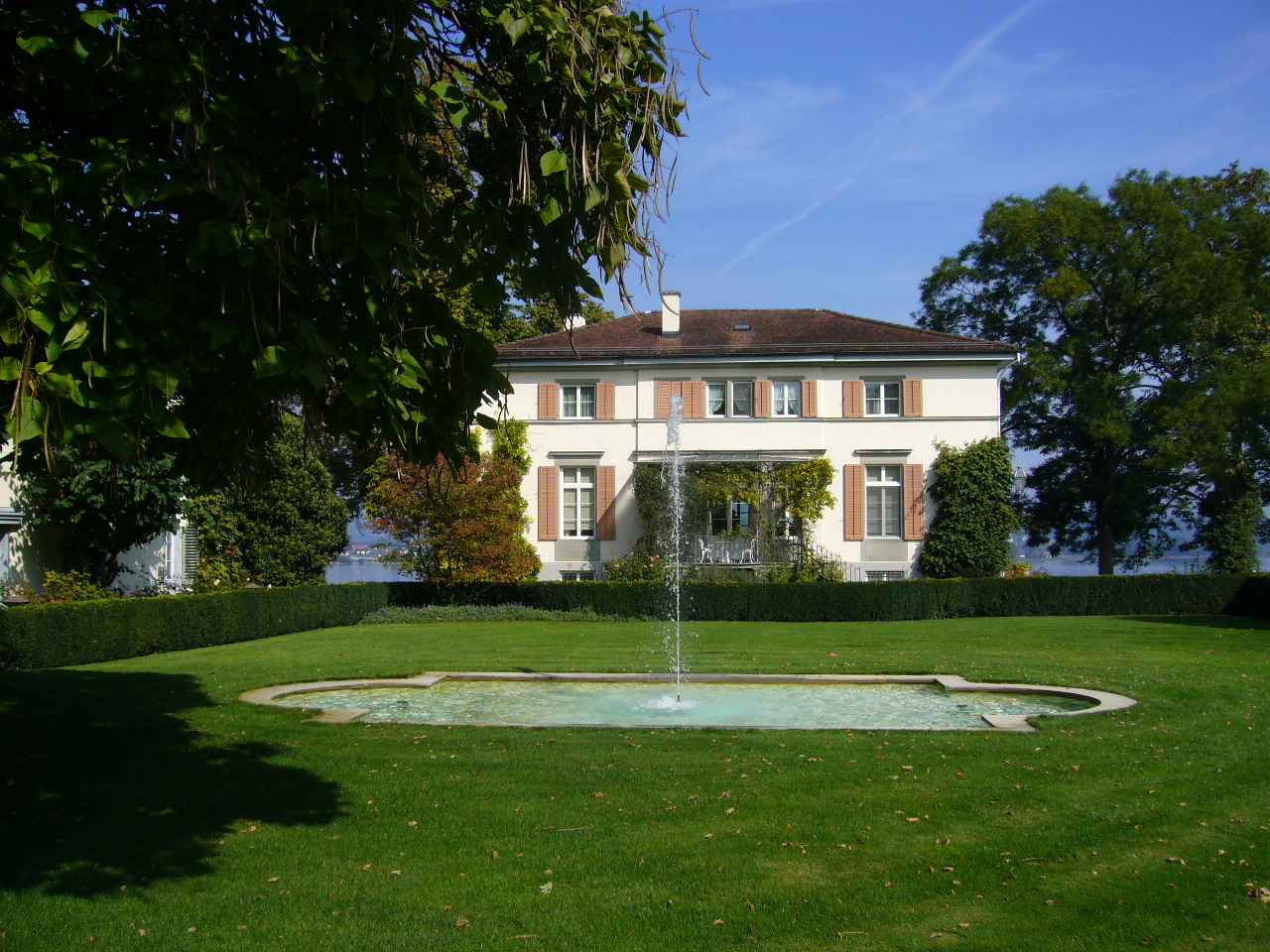
Villa Lilienberg

In 1756 the community acquired rights to most itself, except for the mills and water rights. In 1763 the guild of master shoemakers opened in Ermatingen. By the end of the 18th century, it possessed the internal customs and navigation rights. In the 19th century fishing, cereals grains, fruit, hemp and viticulture were the basis of the villagers economy. With the expansion of the Seestrasse (Lake Road) (1823), the steamship company on the lake (since 1825) and the railway (1875), the town saw increased traffic. After 1870, tourism became a major industry in Ermatingen. At the end of the 19th century the mechanical embroidery and trans-shipping industries entered the town. In 1848 a carpentry factory moved into the town, and in 1936 it became the Jacques Goldinger AG company. In 1875 a tin can and aluminum products factory (Louis Sauter AG) opened in Ermatingen, followed by several other manufacturing companies. During the 20th century agriculture became increasingly less important. The commercial fisheries have mostly vanished, though some fish breeding and the traditional "Gropp Carnival" remain in town. The UBS Training Center at Schloss Wolfsberg (opened in 1975) and the Entrepreneurs' Forum Lilienberg (since 1989) have turned Ermatingen into a nationally known training site (in 2000 almost two thirds of jobs were in the services sector). Ermatingen has been the meeting location for the Wolfsberg Group, a global banking organization, since its founding in 1999.

== Geography ==
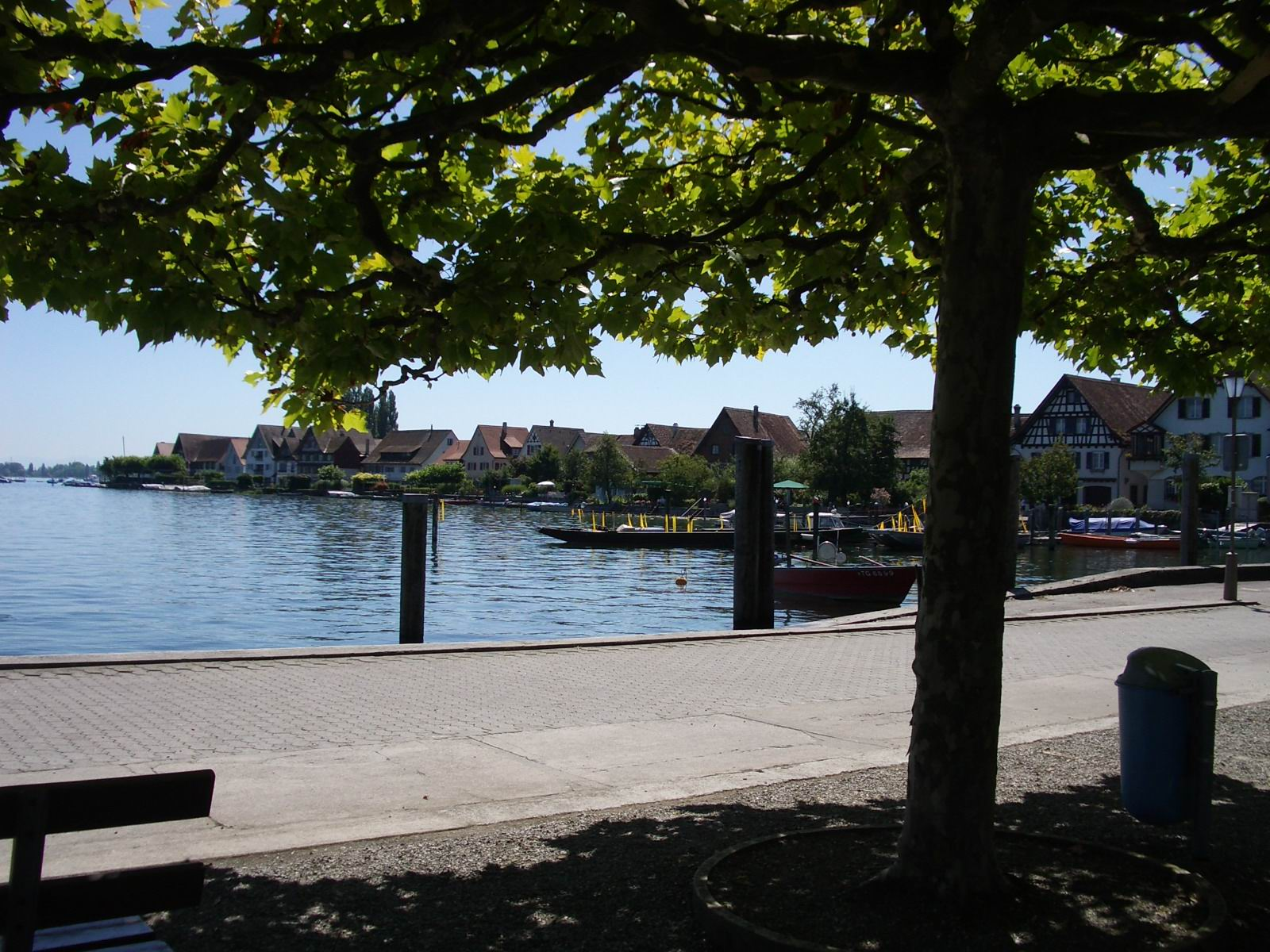
Lake Constance in Ermatingen

Ermatingen had an area, (as of the 2004/09 survey) of 10.46 km^{2} (4.04 sq mi). Of this area, 4.32 km^{2} (1.67 sq mi) or 41.4% is used for agricultural purposes, while 4.38 km^{2} (1.69 sq mi) or 42.0% is forested. Of the rest of the land, 1.4 km^{2} (0.54 sq mi) or 13.4% is settled (buildings or roads), 0.01 km^{2} (2.5 acres) or 0.1% is either rivers or lakes and 0.31 km^{2} (0.12 sq mi) or 3.0% is unproductive land.

Of the built up area, industrial buildings made up 7.1% of the total area while housing and buildings made up 1.1% and transportation infrastructure made up 0.5%. while parks, green belts and sports fields made up 3.8%. Out of the forested land, 40.5% of the total land area is heavily forested and 1.4% is covered with orchards or small clusters of trees. Of the agricultural land, 36.8% is used for growing crops, while 4.6% is used for orchards or vine crops. All the water in the municipality is flowing water.

Over the past two decades (1979/85-2004/09) the amount of land that is settled has increased by 26 ha (64 acres) and the agricultural land has decreased by 26 ha (64 acres).

The municipality is located in the Kreuzlingen district, on the Untersee section of Lake Constance across from Reichenau Island in Germany. It consists of the villages of Ermatingen and Triboltingen.

== Demographics ==
Ermatingen has a population (as of December 2020) of 3,640. As of 2013, 28.2% of the population are resident foreign nationals. Over the last 3 years (2010-2013) the population has changed at a rate of 7.33%. The birth rate in the municipality, in 2013, was 7.8 while the death rate was 5.6 per thousand residents.

Most of the population (as of 2000) speaks German (92.3%), with Italian as second most common (2.1%) and Albanian as third (1.1%).

As of 2008, the gender distribution of the population was 50.4% male and 49.6% female. The population was made up of 1,057 Swiss men (37.3% of the population), and 372 (13.1%) non-Swiss men. There were 1,091 Swiss women (38.5%), and 316 (11.1%) non-Swiss women.

As of 2013, children and teenagers (0–19 years old) make up 18.2% of the population, while adults (20–64 years old) are 62.2% and seniors (over 64 years old) make up 19.6%.

As of 2000, there were 1,072 private households in the municipality, and an average of 2.2 persons per household. In 2000 there were 431 single family homes (or 75.5% of the total) out of a total of 571 inhabited buildings. There were 65 two family buildings (11.4%), 29 three family buildings (5.1%) and 46 multi-family buildings (or 8.1%). There were 701 (or 28.9%) persons who were part of a couple without children, and 1,163 (or 47.9%) who were part of a couple with children. There were 132 (or 5.4%) people who lived in single parent home, while there are 5 persons who were adult children living with one or both parents, 8 persons who lived in a household made up of relatives, 27 who lived in a household made up of unrelated persons, and 22 who are either institutionalized or live in another type of collective housing.

In 2013 there were 1,354 private households in Ermatingen. Of the 711 inhabited buildings in the municipality, in 2000, about 60.6% were single family homes and 19.7% were multiple family buildings. Additionally, about 38.1% of the buildings were built before 1919, while 13.9% were built between 1991 and 2000. In 2012 the rate of construction of new housing units per 1000 residents was 20.44. The vacancy rate for the municipality, in 2014, was 3.14%.

In 2000 there were 1,245 apartments in the municipality. The most common apartment size was the 4 room apartment of which there were 332. There were 61 single room apartments and 195 apartments with six or more rooms. As of 2000 the average price to rent an average apartment in Ermatingen was 1058.37 Swiss francs (CHF) per month (US$850, £480, €680 approx. exchange rate from 2000). The average rate for a one-room apartment was 457.95 CHF (US$370, £210, €290), a two-room apartment was about 769.31 CHF (US$620, £350, €490), a three-room apartment was about 899.99 CHF (US$720, £400, €580) and a six or more room apartment cost an average of 1772.83 CHF (US$1420, £800, €1130). The average apartment price in Ermatingen was 94.8% of the national average of 1116 CHF.

The historical population is given in the following table:

year	population
1850	1,708
1900	1,728
1970	2,089
1980	1,992
1990	2,171
2000	2,427

== Heritage sites of national significance ==
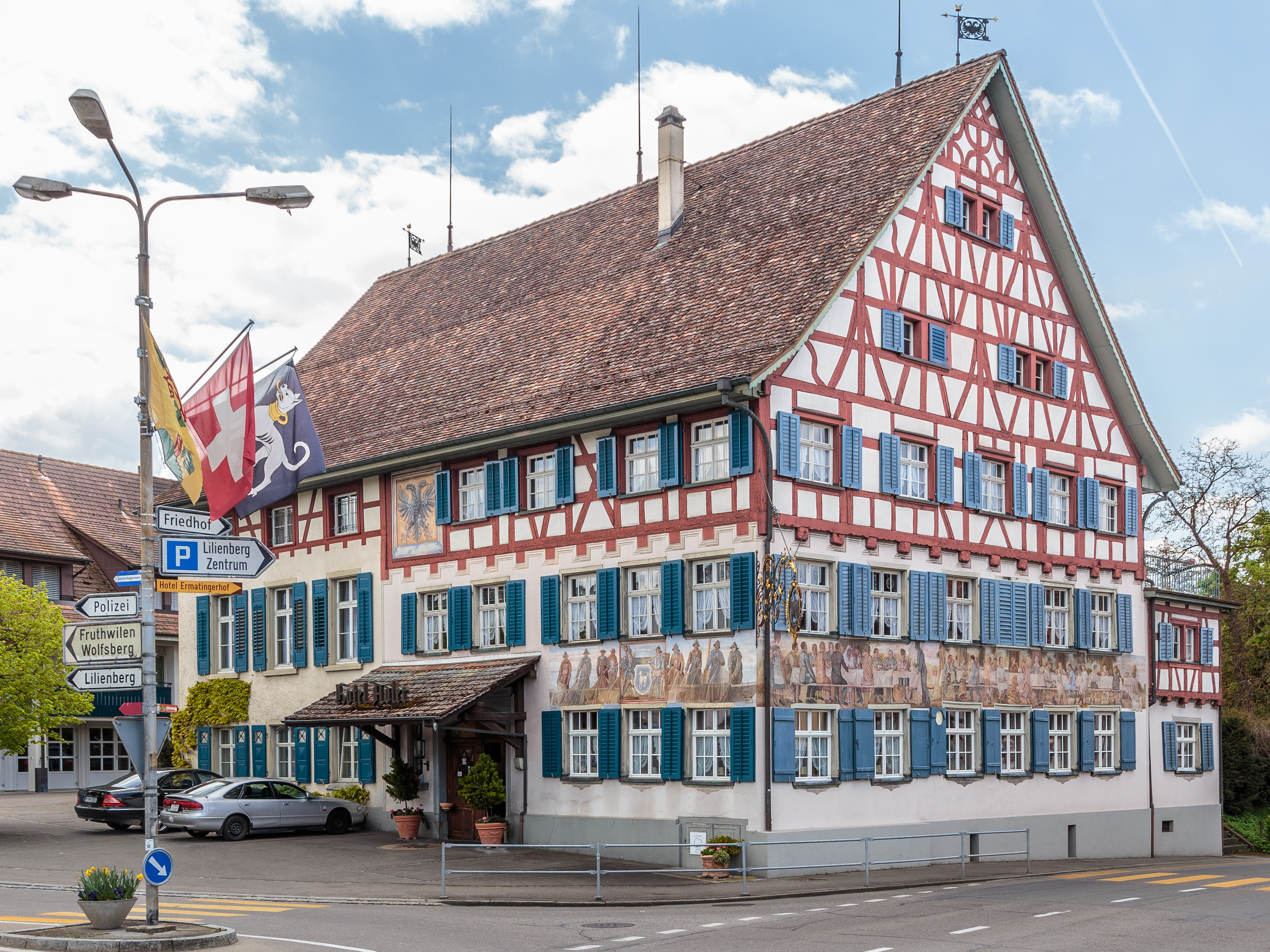
Gasthaus Adler

The Gasthaus Adler, the Kehlhof, the Church of St Albin, and the prehistoric shoreline settlement of Westerfeld/Büge are listed as Swiss heritage sites of national significance. The villages of Ermatingen and Triboltingen as well as the Untersee region (including Ermatingen, Gottlieben, Kreuzlingen, Salenstein, Tägerwilen) are all listed as part of the Inventory of Swiss Heritage Sites.

== Economy ==
As of 2007, Ermatingen had an unemployment rate of 1.65%. As of 2012, there were a total of 1,141 people employed in the municipality. Of these, 75 people worked in 32 businesses in the primary economic sector. The secondary sector employed 298 workers in 51 separate businesses. Finally, the tertiary sector provided 768 jobs in 200 businesses. In 2013 a total of 20.4% of the population received social assistance.

In 2000 there were 1,641 workers who lived in the municipality. Of these, 733 or about 44.7% of the residents worked outside Ermatingen while 457 people commuted into the municipality for work. There were a total of 1,365 jobs (of at least 6 hours per week) in the municipality. Of the working population, 8.5% used public transportation to get to work, and 51% used a private car.

== Politics ==
In the 2011 federal election the most popular party was the SVP with 37.1% of the vote. The next three most popular parties were the FDP (15.4%), the SP (12.9%) and the CVP (11.9%). In the federal election, a total of 860 votes were cast, and the voter turnout was 48.8%.

In the 2007 federal election the most popular party was the SVP which received 43.14% of the vote. The next three most popular parties were the FDP (16.57%), the CVP (13.53%) and the SP (10.83%). In the federal election, a total of 878 votes were cast, and the voter turnout was 49.9%.

== Religion ==
From the 2000 census, 728 or 30.0% were Roman Catholic, while 1,311 or 54.0% belonged to the Swiss Reformed Church. Of the rest of the population, there were 2 Old Catholics (or about 0.08% of the population) who belonged to the Christian Catholic Church of Switzerland there are 22 individuals (or about 0.91% of the population) who belong to the Orthodox Church, and there are 35 individuals (or about 1.44% of the population) who belong to another Christian church. There were 55 (or about 2.27% of the population) who are Islamic. There are 7 individuals (or about 0.29% of the population) who belong to another church (not listed on the census), 214 (or about 8.82% of the population) belong to no church, are agnostic or atheist, and 53 individuals (or about 2.18% of the population) did not answer the question.

== Transport ==
Ermatingen sits on the Lake Line between Schaffhausen and Rorschach and is served by the St. Gallen S-Bahn at Ermatingen railway station and Triboltingen railway station.

Ermatingen has a landing stage. Between spring and autumn, the URh offers regular boat services on the High Rhine and Untersee between Schaffhausen and Kreuzlingen, via Konstanz.

== Education ==
In Ermatingen about 77.5% of the population (between age 25-64) have completed either non-mandatory upper secondary education or additional higher education (either university or a Fachhochschule).

Ermatingen is home to the Ermatingen primary school district. It is also home to the Ermatingen secondary school district. In the 2008/2009 school year there were 197 students in the primary school district. There were 54 children in the kindergarten, and the average class size was 18 kindergartners. Of the children in kindergarten, 30 or 55.6% were female, 9 or 16.7% were not Swiss citizens and 2 or 3.7% did not speak German natively. The lower and upper primary levels begin at about age 5-6 and last for 6 years. There were 63 children in who were at the lower primary level and 80 children in the upper primary level. The average class size in the primary school was 20.43 students. At the lower primary level, there were 39 children or 61.9% of the total population who were female, 19 or 30.2% were not Swiss citizens and 7 or 11.1% did not speak German natively. In the upper primary level, there were 38 or 47.5% who were female, 15 or 18.8% were not Swiss citizens and 6 or 7.5% did not speak German natively.

There are 100 students in the secondary school district. At the secondary level, students are divided according to performance. The secondary level begins at about age 12 and usually lasts 3 years. There were 68 teenagers who were in the advanced school, of which 35 or 51.5% were female, 18 or 26.5% were not Swiss citizens and 6 or 8.8% did not speak German natively. There were 32 teenagers who were in the standard school, of which 16 or 50.0% were female, 7 or 21.9% were not Swiss citizens and 4 or 12.5% did not speak German natively. The average class size for all classes at the secondary level was 14.29 students.

== Crime ==
In 2014 the crime rate, of the over 200 crimes listed in the Swiss Criminal Code (running from murder, robbery and assault to accepting bribes and election fraud), in Ermatingen was 24.6 per thousand residents. This rate is lower than average, only 46.0% of the rate in the district, 55.4% of the cantonal rate and 38.1% of the average rate in the entire country. During the same period, the rate of drug crimes was 4.2 per thousand residents, which was 42.4% of the national rate. The rate of violations of immigration, visa and work permit laws was 2.3 per thousand residents. This rate is lower than average, only 30.3% of the rate in the district and 46.9% of the rate for the entire country.

== Notable people ==
- Cesar Lüthi, Swiss sports marketing businessman
- Oskar Naegeli, Swiss dermatologist and chess master
- Otto Naegeli, Swiss hematologist
- Toto Wolff, Formula One team principal and investor
