= Wolfsberg Group =

Global banking association

The Wolfsberg Group
- Named after: The UBS Wolfsberg Center for Training and Dialogue
- Founded: 22 September 2021; 5 years ago
- Founded at: Basel, Switzerland
- Type: Association under Swiss law
- Location: Ermatingen, Switzerland
- Origins: Wolfsberg Principles simple partnership as of 10 October 1999
- Members: 12 global banks
- Website: www.wolfsberg-group.org

The Wolfsberg Group is an association of 12 global banks which aims to develop frameworks and guidance for the management of financial crime risks.

It started as a meeting of banks in 1999 who adopted a number of best practice standards under the name Wolfsberg Principles. On 22 September 2021 the association under Swiss law under the name "The Wolfsberg Group" was founded in Basel.

The Wolfsberg Group's goal has been to develop financial industry standards in the private sector for anti-money laundering (AML), know your customer (KYC) and counter terrorist financing (CTF) policies. Its work is similar to what the Financial Action Task Force on Money Laundering (FATF) does on a government level.

In addition to its AML-activities, the Wolfsberg Group also serves as a collective action group in the field of anti-corruption.

Wolfsberg’s publications are aimed at supervisors and regulators with the intention of highlighting best practices and at other financial institutions who can choose to adopt the approaches set out in the publications and thereby improve the overall standard of financial crime risk management across the global financial services industry.

The group operates under the Chatham House Rule.

== History ==
In 1999, the U.S. Senate Permanent Subcommittee on Investigations called Citigroup's chief executive officer, John Reed, to testify in a public hearing on what the chairman of the Committee, Senator Carl Levin, called a "rogues gallery" of clients at Citibank's private bank. Reed turned to the new head of the Private Bank, Shaukat Aziz (later to become the Prime Minister of Pakistan) to take actions to both resolve allegations and ensure against future such events.

Aziz in New York called Frank Vogl, then vice chairman of the board of directors of Transparency International (based in Washington DC), to discuss a joint initiative. They met and Aziz explained it would be more credible if Transparency International, rather than Citi, invited other leading banks to join Citi in exploring efforts to attain voluntary understandings by major banks to full enforce know-your-customer standards.

A dinner was then organized in New York at Citi, co-hosted by Aziz and Vogl, was attended by representatives in New York of major banks, as well as then TI chairman Peter Eigen and then TI-USA board chairman Fritz Heimann. That meeting initiated discussions, led by Aziz and by the then chief risk officer, Hans-Peter Bauer of UBS in Switzerland.

A meeting was convened at UBS's training center at Schloss Wolfsberg, near Ermatingen in Switzerland. The venue provided the name for the group.

Work proceeded by representatives of the banks and by Jermyn Brooks, a senior executive at Transparency International, which resulted in the first formulation of the Wolfsberg AML Principles for Private Banking. There were originally eight banks, and except for the US and Switzerland, most countries were represented by their largest private bank. Later "a major US investment bank, a large bank from Japan, and a Spanish bank" joined for the original eleven member-group.

In 2000, the Wolfsberg Group was an informal association of the following eleven global banks: Banco Santander, MUFG, Barclays, Citigroup, Credit Suisse, Deutsche Bank, Goldman Sachs, HSBC, J.P. Morgan Chase, Société Générale and UBS.

After the September 11 attacks of 2001, the group changed its focus to include counter terrorist-financing standards.

On 22 September 2021 the previously loosely associated group of banks founded an association under Swiss law under the name "The Wolfsberg Group" with registered domicile in Basel, Switzerland.

In May 2022, in the context of the 2022 Russian invasion of Ukraine the group suggested banks screen their bank customers for negative news stories, in order to assess their financial crime risk. Dow Jones News Service criticized the document as it did not address the importance of using licensed media in assessing the credibility of negative news media sources identified on the internet.

== Current members ==
In June 2015, the Wolfsberg Group expanded to thirteen member banks as Standard Chartered Bank and Bank of America joined the Group. Since the merger of UBS and Crédit Suisse, the Wolfsberg Group has 12 members:

- Bank of America
- Barclays
- Citigroup
- Deutsche Bank
- Goldman Sachs
- HSBC
- J.P. Morgan Chase
- MUFG
- Santander
- Société Générale
- Standard Chartered
- UBS

== Publications ==
As of 2024, the Wolfsberg Group has issued over 50 resources, including what they call The Wolfsberg Standards. The first document published in October 2000 was the Wolfsberg Anti-Money Laundering Principles for Private Banking, and revised in May 2002 and again in 2012.

In November 2002, the group published the Wolfsberg Correspondent Banking Principles, in which they recommended a risk-based approach to AML and to develop an international registry for financial institutions, where those would submit information useful for conducting due diligence. The updated Principles for Correspondent Banking and Principles for Using AI/ML in financial crime were published in 2022. After collaborating with Bankers Almanac, part of Accuity, it launched a Due Diligence Repository as a module separate from its service to support.

In September 2003 the group published the Wolfsberg Monitoring Screening & Searching Principles, in March 2006 the Wolfsberg Managing Money Laundering Risks, in March 2011 the Wolfsberg Trade Finance Principles that were updated in collaboration with BAFT and the ICC in 2018, in October 2011 the Wolfsberg Guidance on Prepaid & Stored Value Cards, in 2012 the Wolfsberg Private Banking Principles, and in 2014 the 14-page Wolfsberg Group Mobile and Internet Payment Services (MIPS) Paper. In 2017 they published the Wolfsberg Payment Transparency Standards that were updated in 2023. In 2019 they published a guidance on sanctions screening for financial institutions to assess their effectiveness of sanctions screening and began publishing papers on what effectiveness means in the context of combatting financial crime. In 2023, the Group published updated versions of its CBDDQ/FCCQ questionnaires and guidance, of its ABC guidance and of its Payment Transparency Standards. In 2024, the Group published updated versions of its RMA, Country Risk papers and a new paper on Auditing for Effectiveness.

== Outreach ==
{

The Group is a regular contributor to consultations issued by the Financial Action Task Force, such as the consultation on Non-profit organisations (August 2023), the risk-based Guidance on Recommendation 25 (December 2023), and the consultation on R.16, in April 2024. The Group also responds to consultations from the European Banking Authority (e.g. on the EU AML/CFT Legislative Package in October 2022, on Derisking in February 2023, mitigation of money laundering and terrorist financing risks by financial institutions and crypto-asset service providers in August 2023, and on the EBA Travel Rule in February 2024), and His Majesty’s Treasury (e.g. on the UK Supervisory regime in October 2023)

== Press coverage and criticism ==
The group announces its publications via its website and LinkedIn pages and offers interested parties the ability to sign up for its newsletter.

Robert Mazur, a former undercover US DEA agent investigating money laundering, called the Wolfsberg group "wolves [...] guarding the sheep".

== See also ==
- Basel Committee on Banking Supervision
- OECD Anti-Bribery Convention
- Bank for International Settlements
