= Markelfingen station =

Railway station in Konstanz, Germany

Markelfingen
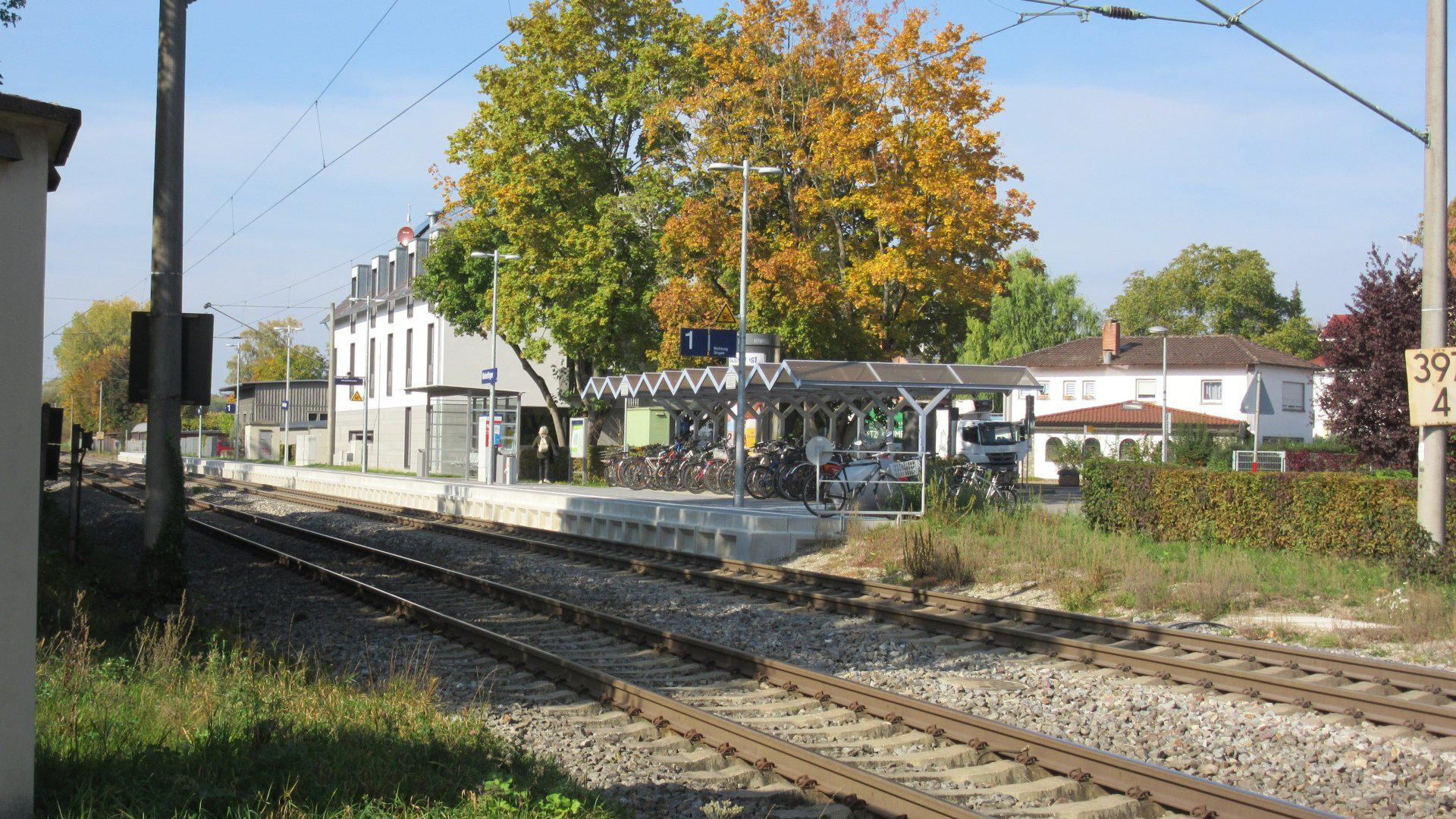
- The station in 2018

General information
- Location: Radolfzell, Baden-Württemberg; Germany
- Coordinates: 47°44′22″N 9°00′10″E
- Owner: DB Netz
- Lines: High Rhine Railway (KBS 720)
- Platforms: 1 side platform
- Tracks: 2
- Train operators: SBB GmbH

Other information
- Fare zone: 4 (Verkehrsverbund Hegau-Bodensee)

Services
Preceding station	SBB Deutschland	Following station
Radolfzell towards Engen	S6	Allensbach towards Konstanz
Location

Markelfingen station (German: Bahnhof Allensbach) is a railway station in Markelfingen in the municipality of Radolfzell am Bodensee, Baden-Württemberg, Germany. It is located on the standard gauge High Rhine Railway line of Deutsche Bahn and is served solely by regional trains.

== Services ==
The station is called at by the Seehas, a named train which is also part of Bodensee S-Bahn. As of the December 2023 timetable change, the following services stop at Markelfingen:

- SBB GmbH S6: half-hourly service between Engen and Konstanz, via Singen (Hohentwiel)
