= Ermatingen railway station =

Railway station in Switzerland

Ermatingen
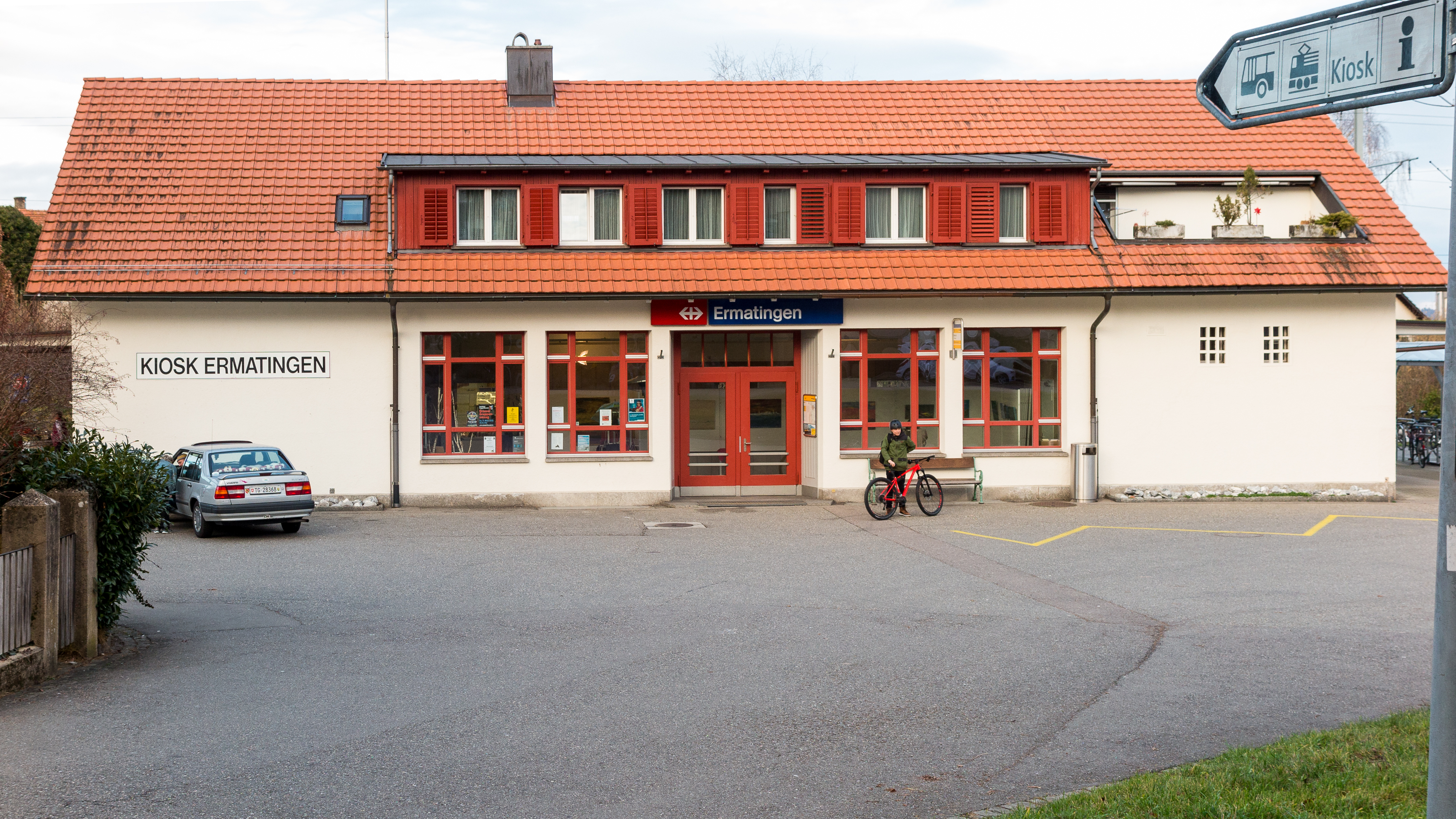
- The station building in 2018

General information
- Location: Ermatingen; Switzerland
- Coordinates: 47°39′50″N 9°5′4″E
- Elevation: 402 m (1,319 ft)
- Owner: Swiss Federal Railways
- Line: Lake line
- Train operators: Thurbo
- Connections
- Ship: URh passenger ships
- Bus: PostAuto bus route 833

Other information
- Fare zone: 255 (Tarifverbund Ostschweiz)

Services
Preceding station	St. Gallen S-Bahn	Following station
Mannenbach-Salenstein towards Schaffhausen	S1	Triboltingen towards Wil
Location
- Location within Switzerland Location within Canton of Thurgau

Ermatingen railway station (German: Bahnhof Ermatingen) is a railway station in Ermatingen, in the Swiss canton of Thurgau. It is an intermediate stop on the Lake line and is served by local trains only.

The station is close to the southern shore of the Untersee (Lake Constance). It is one of two railway stations in the municipality of Ermatingen, the other one being Triboltingen.

== Services ==
Ermatingen is served by the S1 of the St. Gallen S-Bahn, as a request stop:

- S1: half-hourly service between Schaffhausen and Wil via St. Gallen.

PostAuto buses depart from the station forecourt. A nearby landing stage, ca. 550 m (1,800 ft) to the north, is served by passenger boats of Schweizerische Schifffahrtsgesellschaft Untersee und Rhein (URh), which operate between Schaffhausen and Kreuzlingen.

== See also ==
- Rail transport in Switzerland
