= Triboltingen railway station =

Train station in Switzerland

Triboltingen
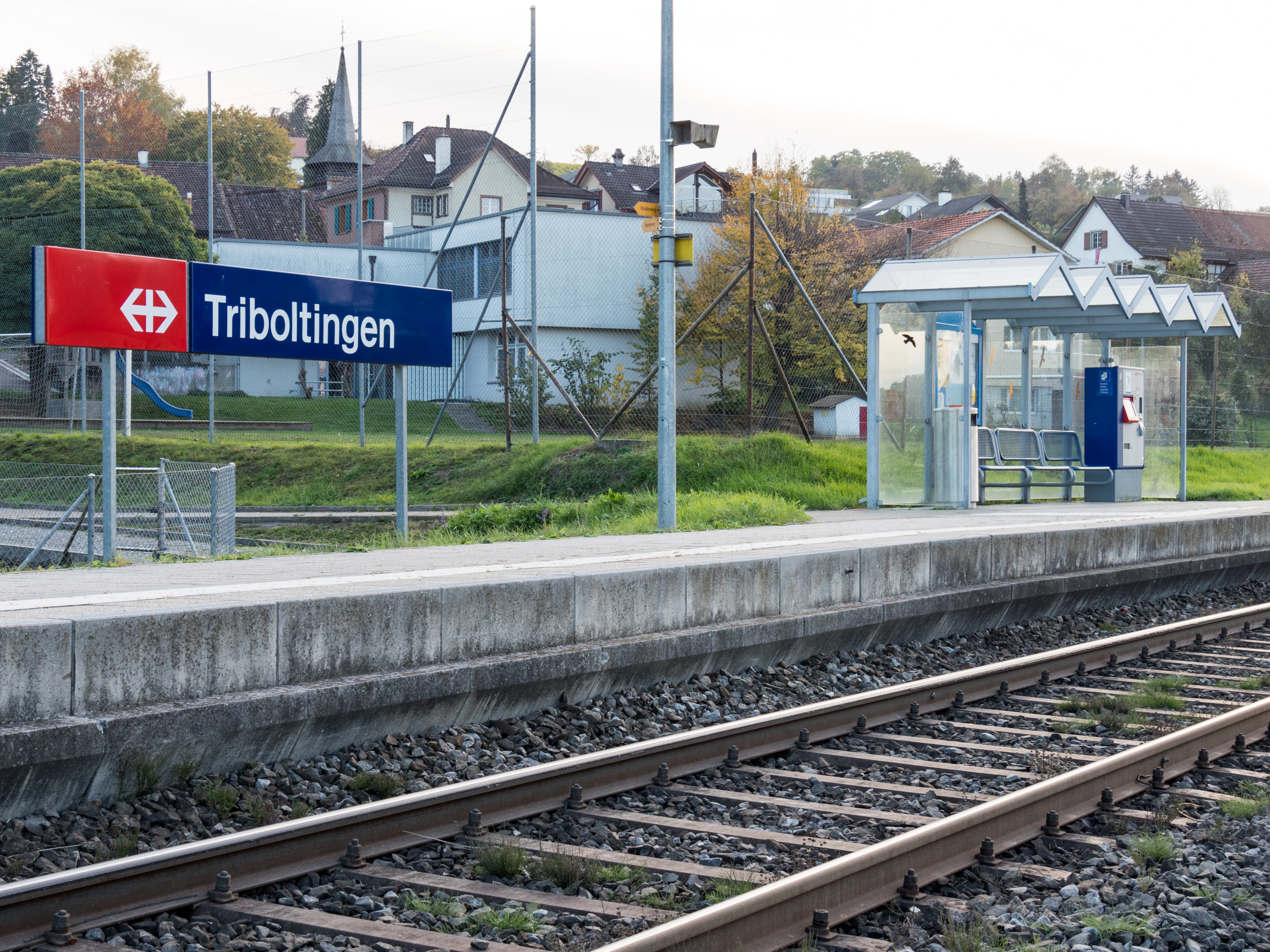
- The platform and shelter in 2018

General information
- Location: Ermatingen; Switzerland
- Coordinates: 47°39′46.444″N 9°6′31.500″E
- Elevation: 401 m (1,316 ft)
- Owner: Swiss Federal Railways
- Line: Lake line
- Platforms: 1 side platform
- Tracks: 1
- Train operators: Thurbo

Other information
- Fare zone: 255 (Tarifverbund Ostschweiz)

Services
Preceding station	St. Gallen S-Bahn	Following station
Ermatingen towards Schaffhausen	S1	Tägerwilen-Gottlieben towards Wil
Location
- Location within Switzerland Location within Canton of Thurgau

Triboltingen railway station (German: Bahnhof Triboltingen) is a railway station in the village of Triboltingen, part of the municipality of Ermatingen, in the Swiss canton of Thurgau. It is an intermediate stop on the Lake line and is served by local trains only.

== Services ==
Triboltingen is served by the S1 of the St. Gallen S-Bahn, as a request stop:

- S1: half-hourly service between Schaffhausen and Wil, via St. Gallen.

== See also ==
- Rail transport in Switzerland
