= Hegne station =

Railway station in Konstanz, Germany

Hegne
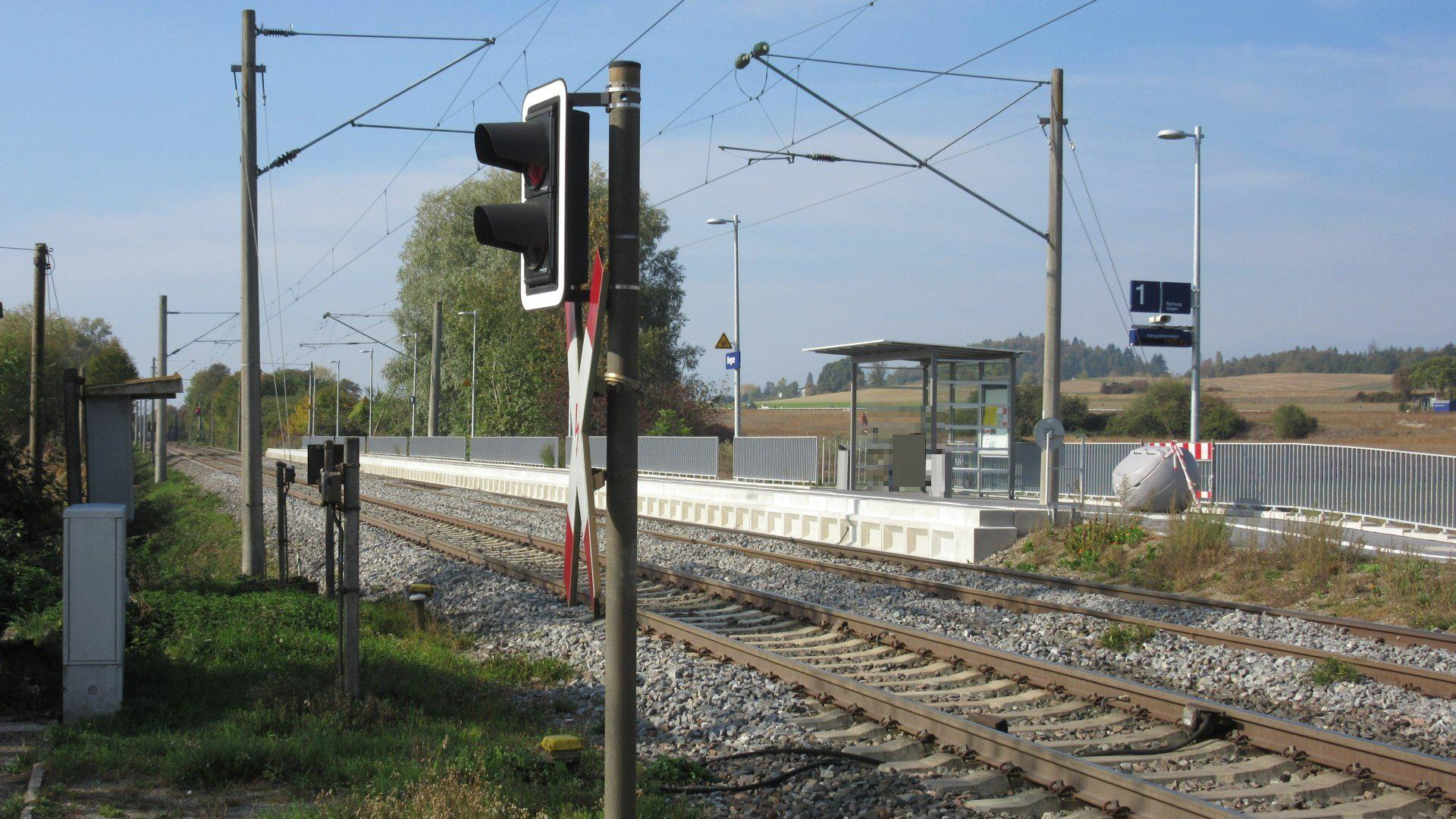
- The station in 2018

General information
- Location: Allensbach, Baden-Württemberg; Germany
- Coordinates: 47°42′22″N 9°05′58″E
- Owner: DB Netz
- Lines: High Rhine Railway (KBS 720)
- Platforms: 2 side platforms
- Tracks: 2
- Train operators: SBB GmbH

Other information
- Fare zone: 5 (Verkehrsverbund Hegau-Bodensee)

Services
Preceding station	SBB Deutschland	Following station
Allensbach towards Engen	S6	Reichenau (Baden) towards Konstanz
Location

Hegne station (German: Bahnhof Hegne) is a railway station on the Bodanrück peninsula, within the municipality of Allensbach, Baden-Württemberg, Germany. It serves the village of Hegne and Hegne Abbey. It is located on the standard gauge High Rhine Railway of Deutsche Bahn and is served only by regional trains.

== Services ==
The station is called at by the Seehas, a named train which is part of Bodensee S-Bahn. As of the December 2023 timetable change, the following services stop at Hegne:

- SBB GmbH S6: half-hourly service between Engen and Konstanz, via Singen (Hohentwiel)
