= Allensbach station =

Railway station in Konstanz, Germany

Allensbach
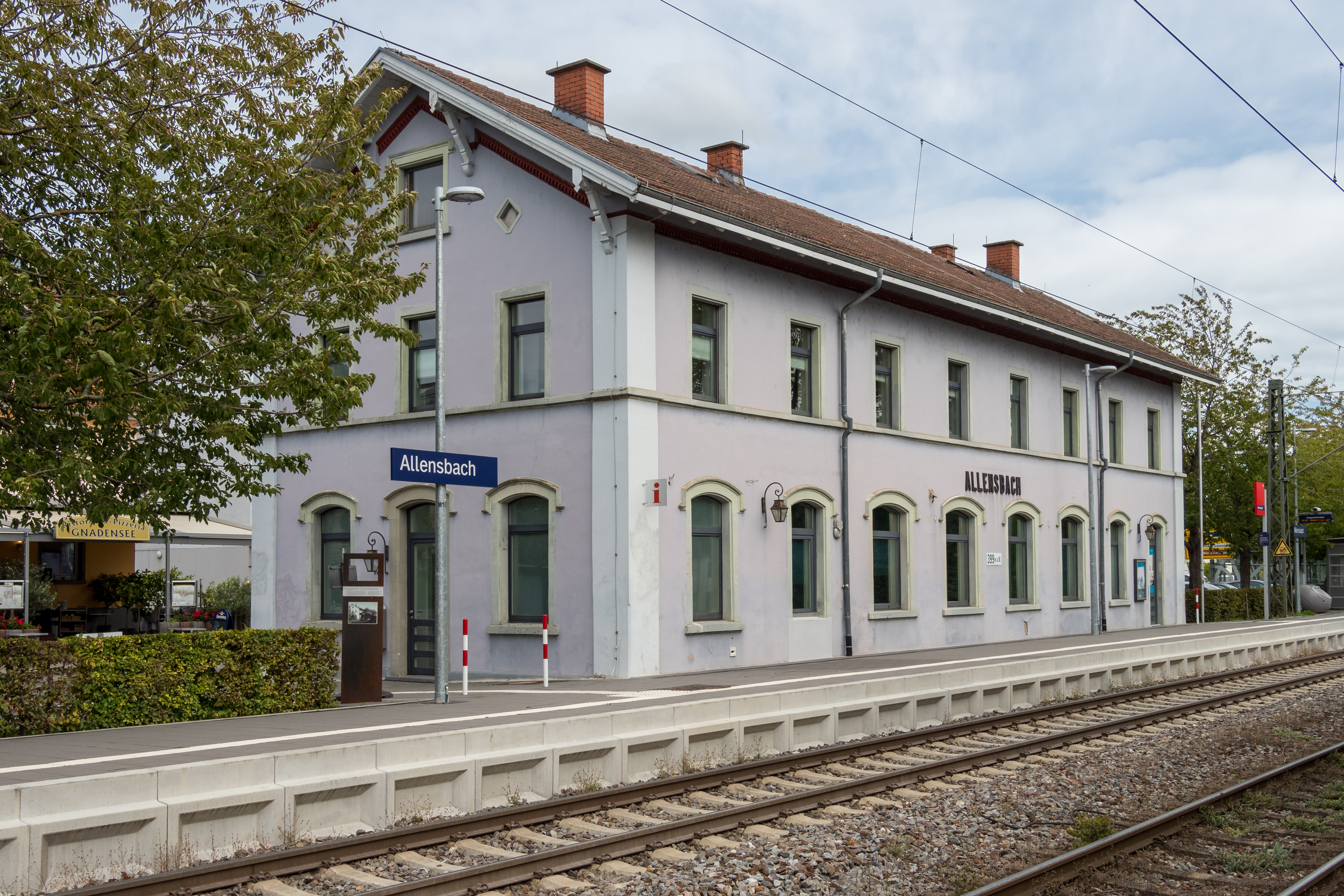
- The station in 2020

General information
- Location: Allensbach, Baden-Württemberg; Germany
- Coordinates: 47°42′52″N 9°04′08″E
- Owner: DB Netz
- Lines: High Rhine Railway (KBS 720)
- Platforms: 2 side platforms
- Tracks: 2
- Train operators: SBB GmbH; DB Regio Baden-Württemberg
- Connections: Stadtbus Tuttlingen

Other information
- Fare zone: 4 and 5 (Verkehrsverbund Hegau-Bodensee)

Services
Preceding station	DB Regio Baden-Württemberg	Following station
Radolfzell towards Karlsruhe Hbf	RE 2	Konstanz-Petershausen towards Konstanz
Preceding station	SBB Deutschland	Following station
Markelfingen towards Engen	S6	Hegne towards Konstanz
Location

Allensbach station (German: Bahnhof Allensbach) is the main railway station in the municipality of Allensbach, Baden-Württemberg, Germany. It is located on the Bodanrück peninsula along the standard gauge High Rhine Railway line of Deutsche Bahn. It is served only by regional trains.

== Services ==
The station is called at by the Seehas, a named train which is part of Bodensee S-Bahn, and a RE. As of the December 2023 timetable change, the following services stop at Allensbach:

- DB Regio Baden-Württemberg RE 2: hourly train between Konstanz and Karlsruhe Hbf, via Singen (Hohentwiel)
- SBB GmbH S6: half-hourly service between Engen and Konstanz, via Singen (Hohentwiel)
