= Reichenau (Baden) station =

Railway station in Konstanz, Germany

Reichenau (Baden)
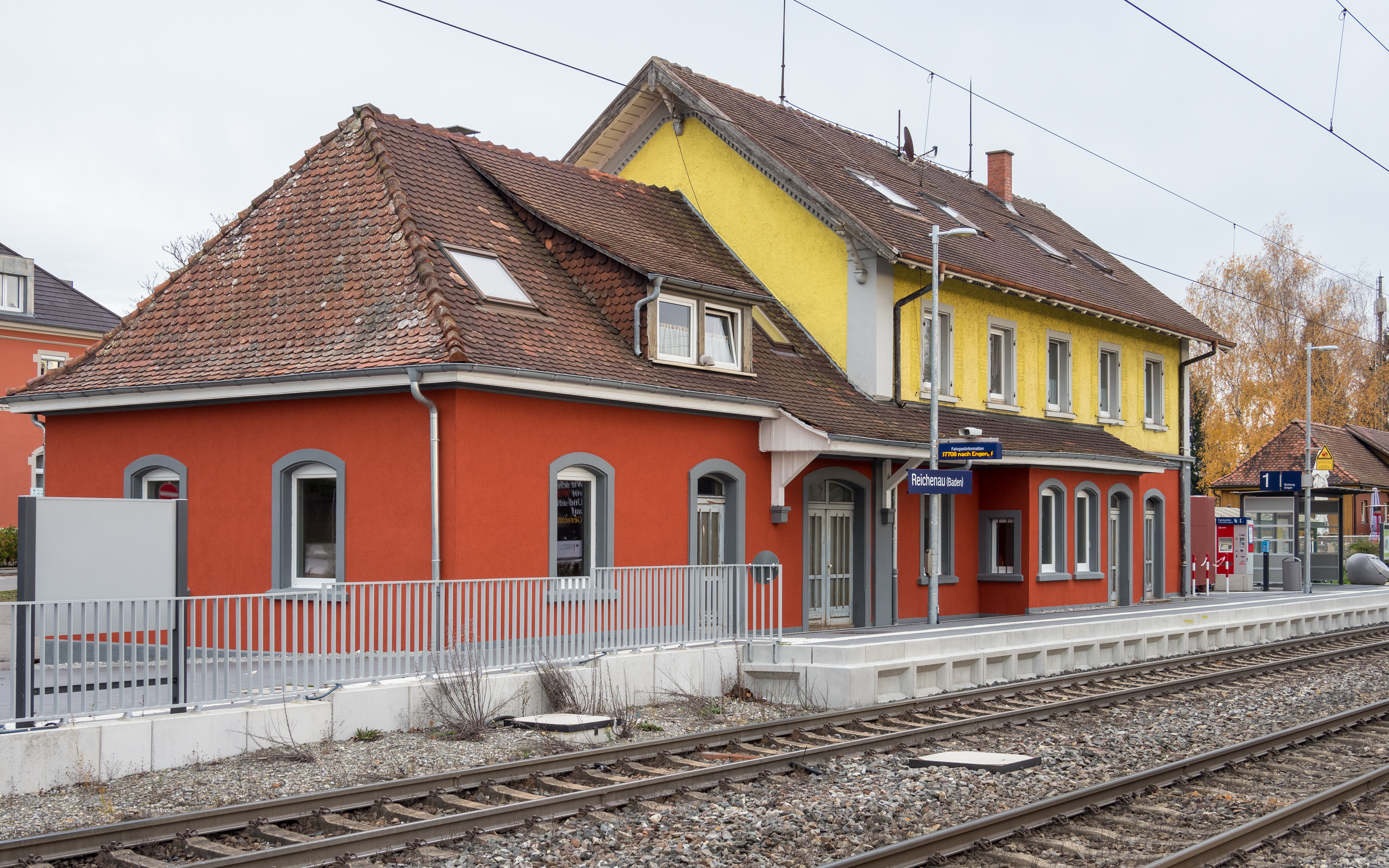
- The station in 2019

General information
- Location: Reichenau, Baden-Württemberg; Germany
- Coordinates: 47°41′22″N 9°07′33″E
- Owner: DB Netz
- Lines: High Rhine Railway (KBS 720)
- Platforms: 2 side platforms
- Tracks: 2
- Train operators: SBB GmbH
- Connections: Stadtbus Tuttlingen, Inselbus

Other information
- Fare zone: 5 (Verkehrsverbund Hegau-Bodensee)

Services
Preceding station	SBB Deutschland	Following station
Hegne towards Engen	S6	Konstanz-Wollmatingen towards Konstanz
Location

Reichenau (Baden) station (German: Bahnhof Reichenau (Baden)) is a railway station on the Bodanrück peninsula serving the island of Reichenau, Lower Lake Constance, Baden-Württemberg, Germany. It is located on the standard gauge High Rhine Railway of Deutsche Bahn and served by regional trains only.

== Services ==
The station is called at by the Seehas, a named train which is part of Bodensee S-Bahn. As of the December 2023 timetable change, the following services stop at Reichenau:

- SBB GmbH S6: half-hourly service between Engen and Konstanz, via Singen (Hohentwiel)
