= Rychnov na Moravě =

- Municipality
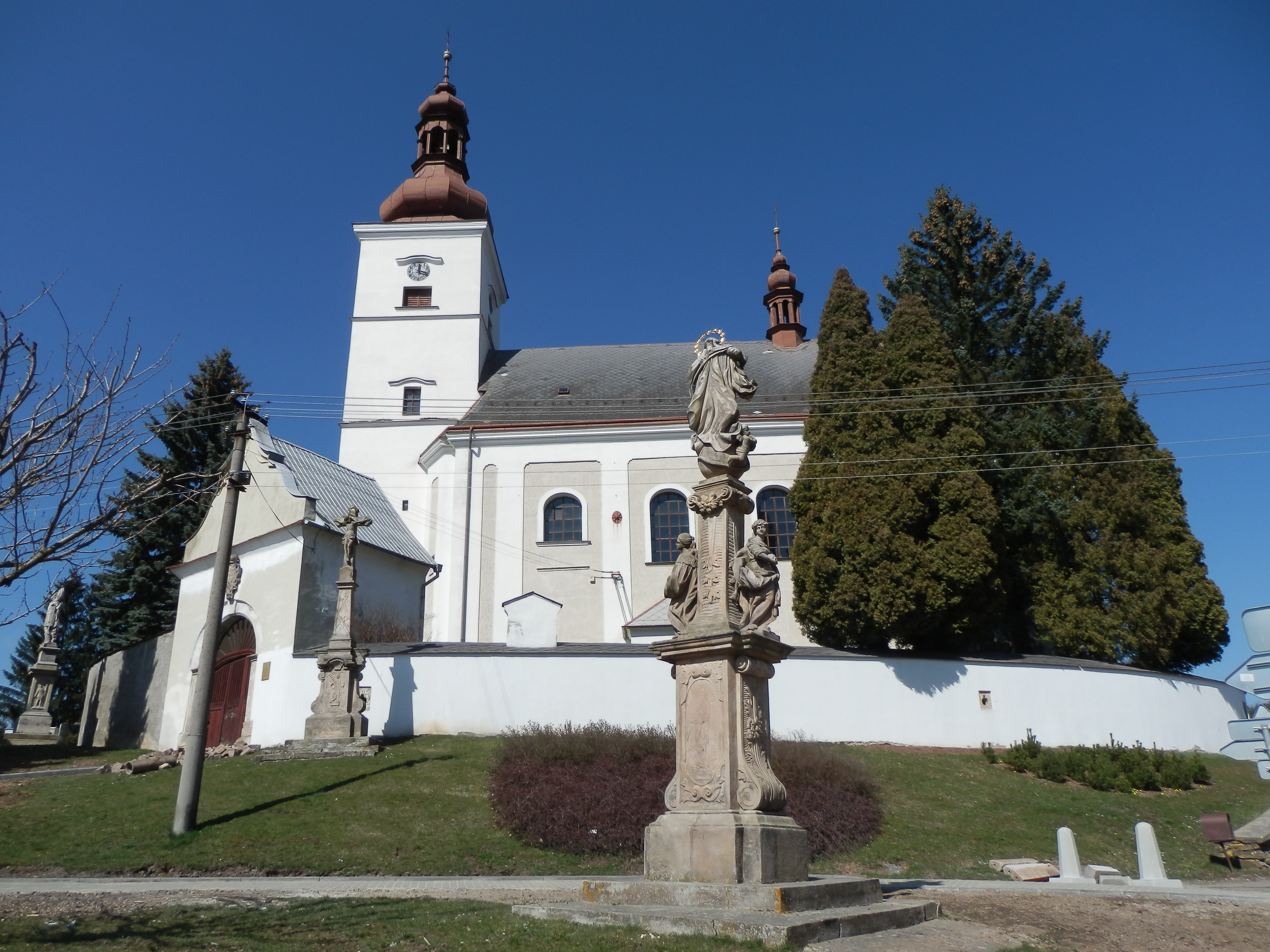
- Church of Saint Nicholas

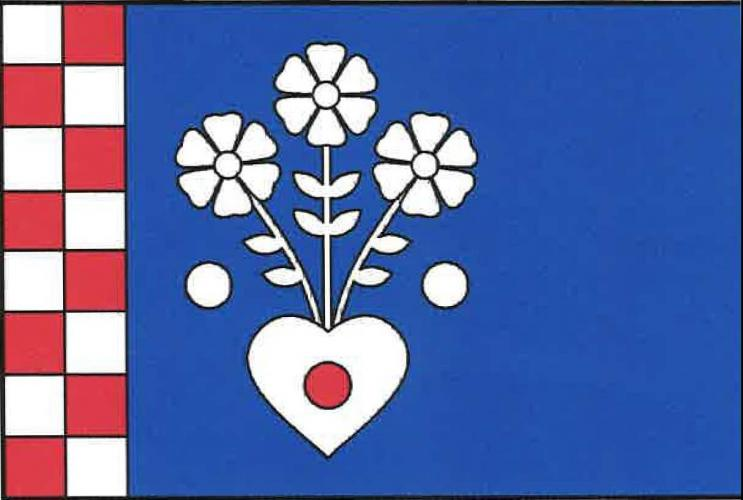
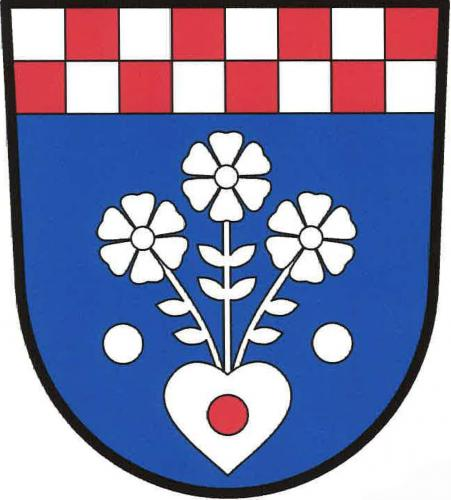
- Flag Coat of arms

- Location in the Czech Republic
- Coordinates: 49°49′45″N 16°38′25″E
- Country: Czech Republic
- Region: Pardubice
- District: Svitavy
- First mentioned: 1365

Area
  - Total: 23.58 km^{2} (9.10 sq mi)
- Elevation: 355 m (1,165 ft)

Population (2026-01-01)
  - Total: 612
  - Density: 26.0/km^{2} (67.2/sq mi)
- Time zone: UTC+1 (CET)
  - Summer (DST): UTC+2 (CEST)
- Postal code: 569 34
- Website: www.rychnovnm.cz

Rychnov na Moravě (German: Reichenau) is a municipality and village in Svitavy District in the Pardubice Region of the Czech Republic. It has about 600 inhabitants.

Rychnov na Moravě lies approximately 15 kilometres (9 mi) north-east of Svitavy, 66 km (41 mi) east of Pardubice, and 161 km (100 mi) east of Prague.

== Demographics ==
Historical population
Year	Pop.	±%
1869	1,645	—
1880	1,754	+6.6%
1890	1,712	−2.4%
1900	1,582	−7.6%
1910	1,457	−7.9%
1921	1,446	−0.8%
1930	1,402	−3.0%
1950	785	−44.0%
1961	852	+8.5%
1970	762	−10.6%
1980	736	−3.4%
1991	601	−18.3%
2001	595	−1.0%
2011	567	−4.7%
2021	600	+5.8%
Source: Censuses
