= Reichenau, Baden-Württemberg =

Municipality in Germany

Reichenau
- Municipality
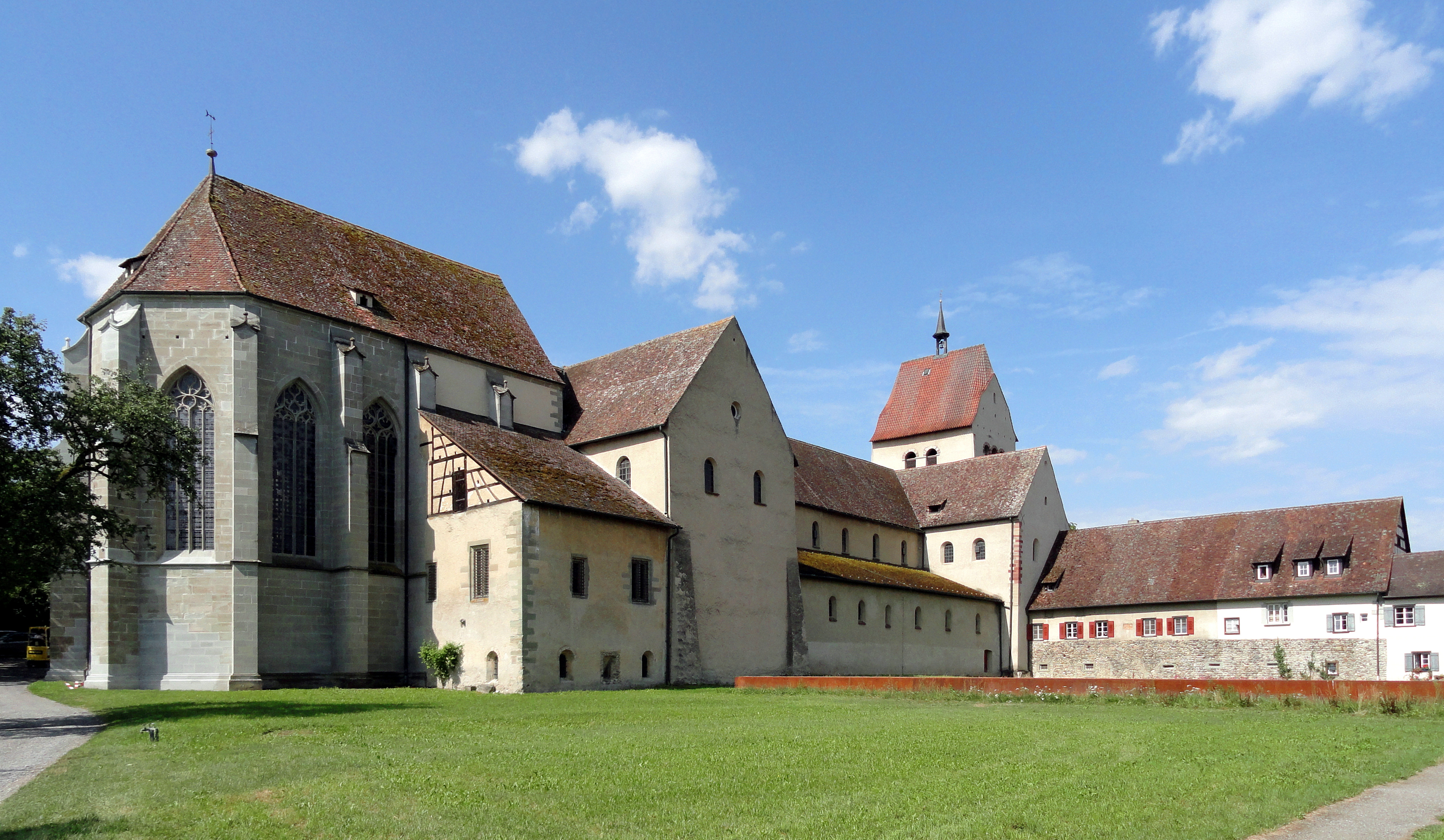
- Saint Mary Church and Monastery

- Coat of arms

- Location of Reichenau within Konstanz district
- Interactive map of Reichenau
- Location within Germany Location within Baden-Württemberg
- Coordinates: 47°41′56″N 09°03′42″E
- Country: Germany
- State: Baden-Württemberg
- Admin. region: Freiburg
- District: Konstanz

Government
  - Mayor (2017–25): Wolfgang Zoll

Area
  - Total: 12.71 km^{2} (4.91 sq mi)
- Elevation: 402 m (1,319 ft)

Population (2025-12-31)
  - Total: 5,165
  - Density: 406.4/km^{2} (1,053/sq mi)
- Time zone: UTC+01:00 (CET)
  - Summer (DST): UTC+02:00 (CEST)
- Postal codes: 78479
- Dialling codes: 07534, 07531
- Vehicle registration: KN
- Website: www.reichenau.de

Reichenau (German pronunciation: [ˈʁaɪçənaʊ]) is a municipality in the district of Konstanz in Baden-Württemberg in Germany. It is located partly on Reichenau Island with its famous abbey and on the northern shore of the Untersee section of Lake Constance. The island has historically been the center of the community. The administrative seat of the municipality is in the village of Mittelzell. A causeway built in 1838 connects the isle with the mainland. The municipality consists of the settlements Niederzell, Mittelzell und Oberzell on the island as well as Lindenbühl and Waldsiedlung on the shore.

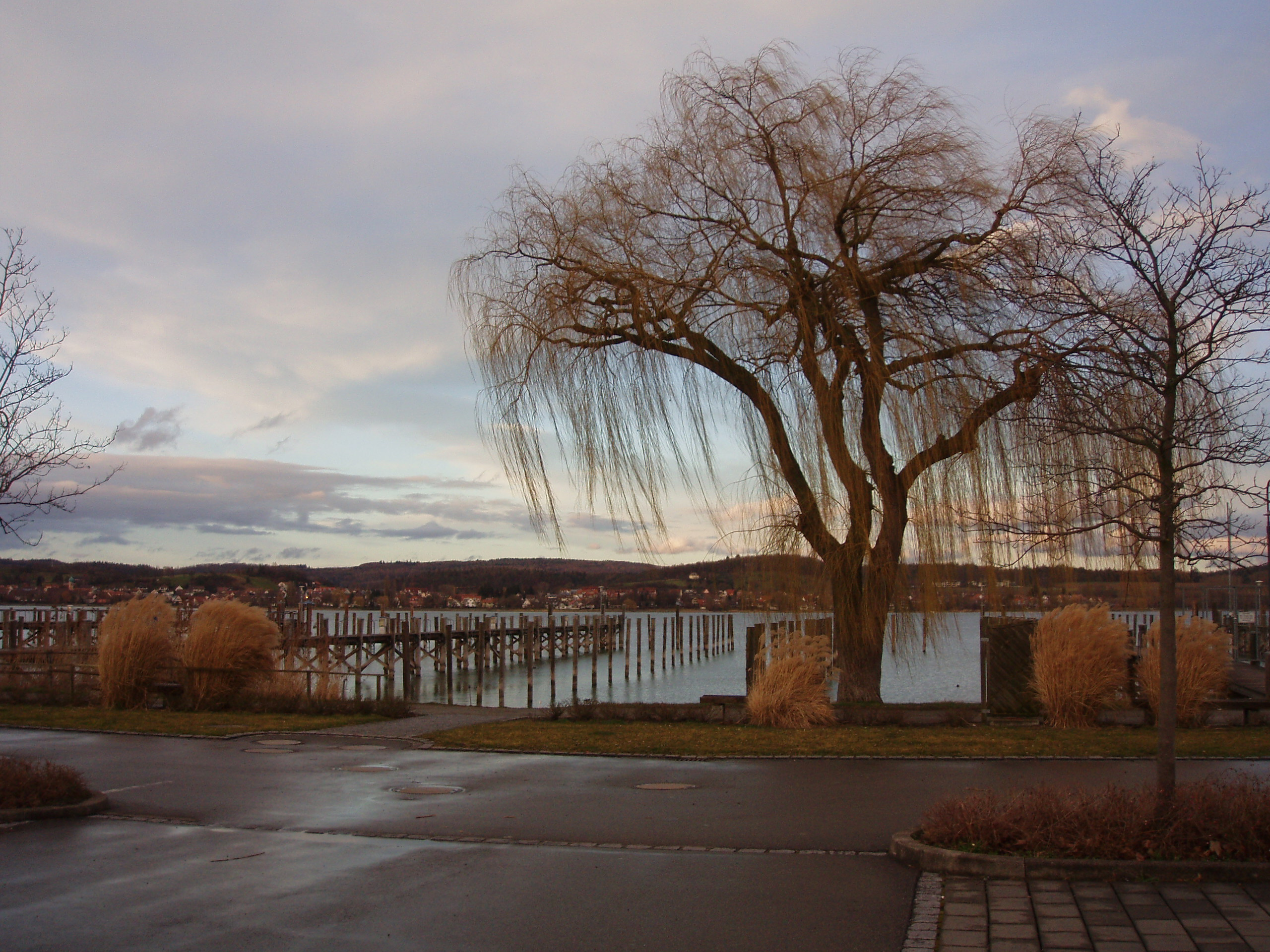
Reichenau Island: View over the Untersee to Allensbach

The municipality encompasses the estates of the former Reichenau Abbey, which was secularized in 1757. Today Reichenau is characterized by the market gardening of fruits and vegetables and also known for its psychiatric hospital, established in 1913, a teaching hospital of the University of Konstanz.

Reichenau can be reached via the Bundesstraße 33 running from the Bundesautobahn 81 to Konstanz. It has also a railway station on the High Rhine Railway (Hochrheinbahn) connecting Basel and Konstanz.

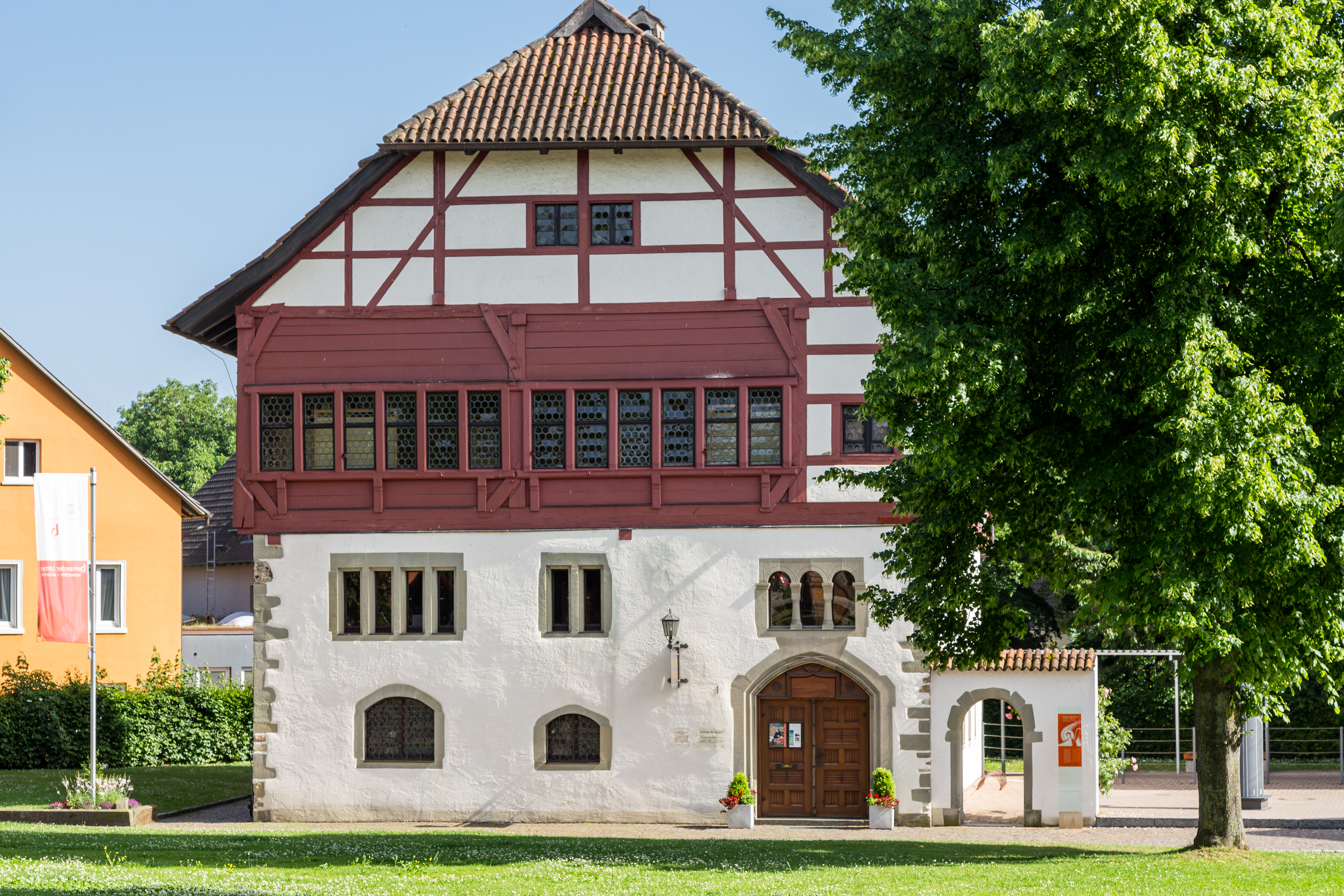
Reichenau Museum

== Transport ==
Reichenau (Baden) is a railway station on the High Rhine Railway line. It is served by regional trains to Konstanz and Singen (Hohentwiel), via Radolfzell.

Reichenau has a landing stage. Between spring and autumn, the URh offers regular boat services on the High Rhine and Untersee between Schaffhausen and Kreuzlingen, via Konstanz.
