= Reichenau Island =

Island in Germany

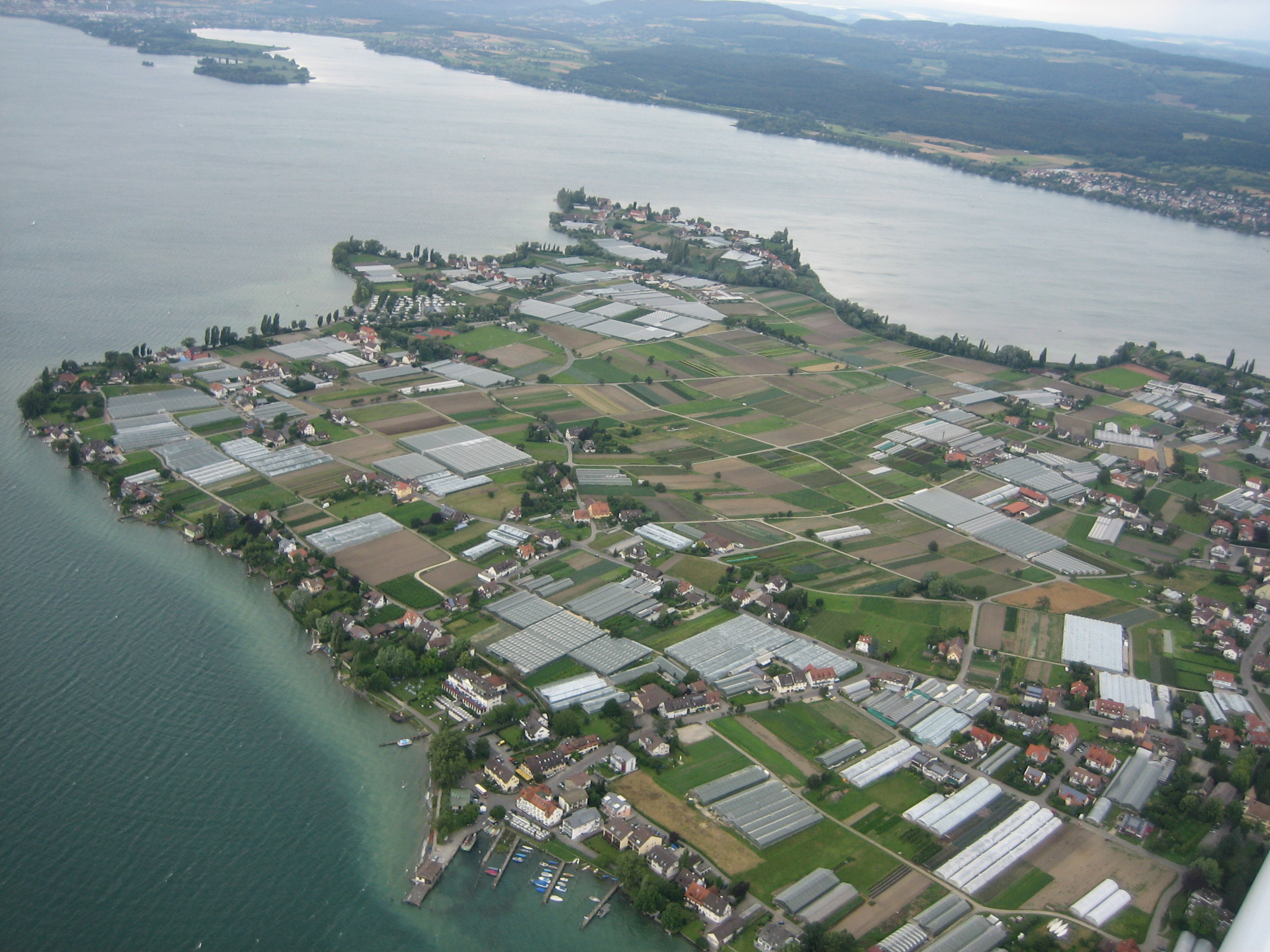
- Aerial view of Reichenau Island

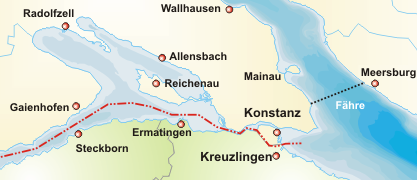
- Reichenau, shown with Konstanz and Bodensee Kreise of Germany (yellow) and Thurgau canton of Switzerland (green)

Geography
- Location: Lake Constance
- Coordinates: 47°41′40″N 9°3′45″E
- Area: 4.3 km^{2} (1.7 sq mi)

Administration
- Germany
- State: Baden-Württemberg
- District: Freiburg

Additional information
- Official website: www.reichenau.de

UNESCO World Heritage Site
- Official name: Monastic Island of Reichenau
- Type: Cultural
- Criteria: iii, iv, vi
- Designated: 2000 (24th session)
- Reference no.: 974
- Region: Europe and North America

Reichenau Island (Note: The Alemannic name of the island was Sindleozesauua, but it was also known as simply Ow, Auua (island) – Latinized as Augia, later also Augia felix or Augia dives (rich, or fertile, island), hence Richenow, Reichenau.) (German: [ˈʁaɪçənaʊ]) is an island in Lake Constance in Southern Germany. It lies almost due west of the city of Konstanz, between the Gnadensee and the Untersee, two parts of Lake Constance. With a total land surface of 4.3 km^{2} (1.7 sq mi) and a circumference of 11 km (6.8 mi), the island is 4.5 km (2.8 mi) long and 1.5 km (0.93 mi) wide at its greatest extent. The highest point, the Hochwart, stands some 43 m (141 ft) above the lake surface and 438.7 m (1,439 ft) above mean sea level.

Reichenau is connected to the mainland by a causeway, completed in 1838, which is intersected between the ruins of Schopflen Castle and the eastern end of Reichenau Island by a 10-metre-wide (33 ft) and 95-metre-long (312 ft) waterway, the Bruckgraben. A low road bridge allows the passage of ordinary boats but not of sailing-boats.

Reichenau Abbey, founded on the island by bishop Pirmin in 724, quickly developed into an influential religious, cultural, and intellectual center. Because of its historical importance and the exceptional quality of the architecture and artwork found in the island's three churches and abbey, Reichenau was declared a World Heritage Site in 2000.

== History ==
Although people occupied Reichenau in the Bronze Age and Iron Age, archeological evidence suggests that Reichenau was abandoned during the Roman era. It remained uninhabited until 724, when the monk Pirmin received support from the Carolingian ruler Charles Martel to build a monastery on the island. The first monastery, at Mittelzel, was wooden, although it was replaced by a stone building by 746. In the early 9th century, under the patronage of the Carolingian dynasty and Ottonian dynasty, the community flourished. In 816 the monastery church of the by-then abbey, was rebuilt in a cruciform basilica style, and churches dedicated to the Virgin and Saint Mark were consecrated. Relics of St. Mark arrived at the abbey in the mid-9th century. Two further churches were built on the island consecrated to Saints Peter and Paul (in 799) and to Saint George (in 896).

The abbey's bailiff was housed in a two-storey stone building to which two more storeys of timber framing were added in the 14th century, one of the oldest timber-frame buildings in southern Germany. It is today used as a museum of local history.

The monastic community of the abbey produced several influential poets and authors, such as Walafrid Strabo (who served as abbot) and scholars such as Hermann of Reichenau and Abbot Reginbert, as well as artists. The famous artworks of Reichenau include (in the church of St George) the Ottonian murals of miracles of Christ, unique survivals from the 10th century. The Plan of St. Gall, the only surviving architectural drawing from the Middle Ages, may also have been created on the island. Among the abbey's far-flung landholdings was Reichenau, a village on the upper Rhine in the municipality of Tamins in the canton of Graubünden, Switzerland, named for the abbey.

In the 16th century, the territory of the Prince-Bishopric of Constance was extended to include Reichenau, and as a result the influence of the abbey waned. During the secularization of the Prince-Bishopric of Constance in 1803, many of the smaller chapels on the island were demolished. In addition, the manuscripts and archives held in the abbey were given to Karlsruhe and the University of Heidelberg library and the surrounding farms were parceled and sold.

Today the island is also famous for its vegetable farms. The Wollmatinger Ried next to the island is a large nature reserve, a wetland area of reeds, which is used by many birds as a stopover during their annual migration.

== Transport ==
Reichenau (Baden) is a railway station on the High Rhine Railway line. It is served by regional trains to Konstanz and Singen (Hohentwiel), via Radolfzell.

Reichenau has a landing stage. Between spring and autumn, the URh offers regular boat services on the High Rhine and Untersee between Schaffhausen and Kreuzlingen, via Konstanz.

== Gallery ==
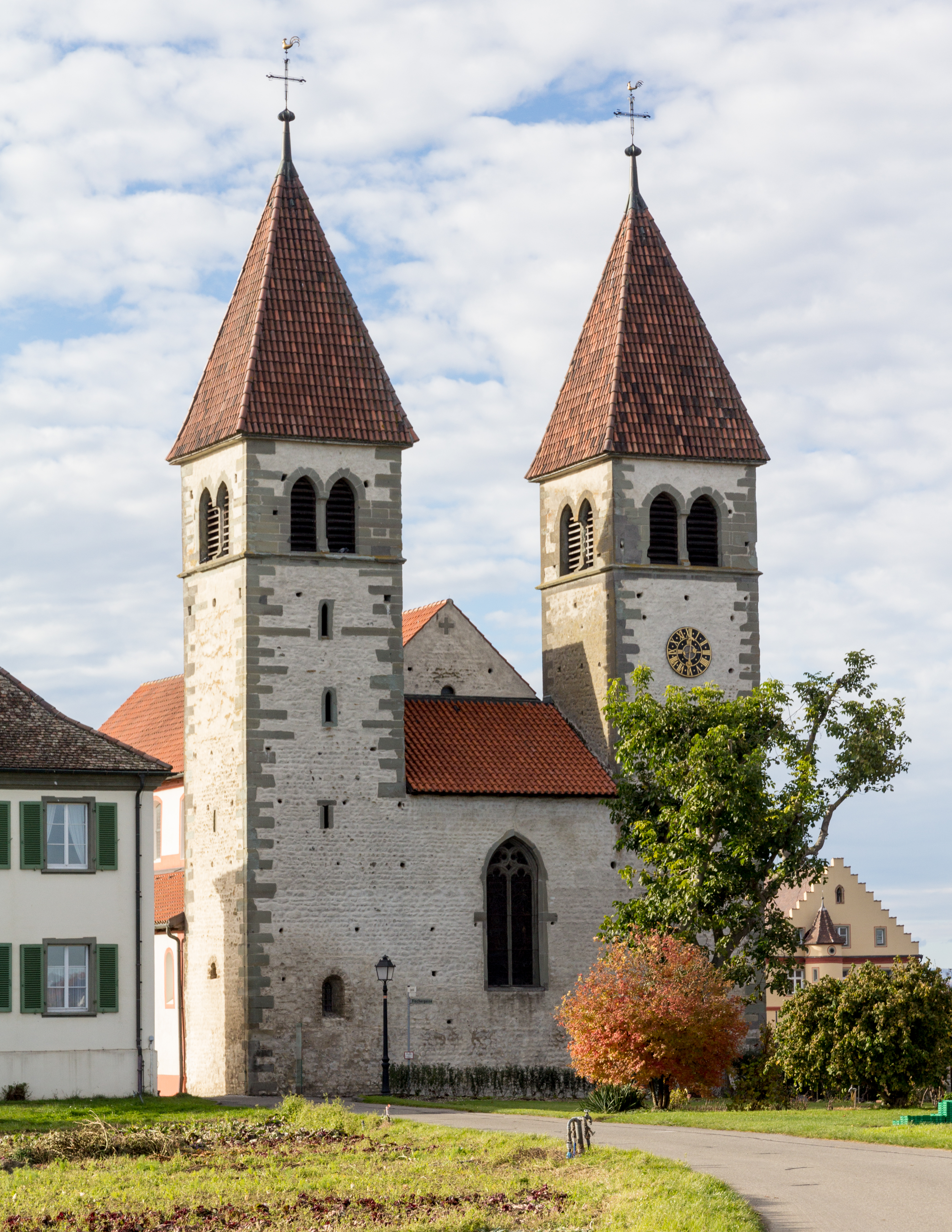
15th-century towers on the Romanesque church of Sts Peter and Paul in Reichenau-Niederzell

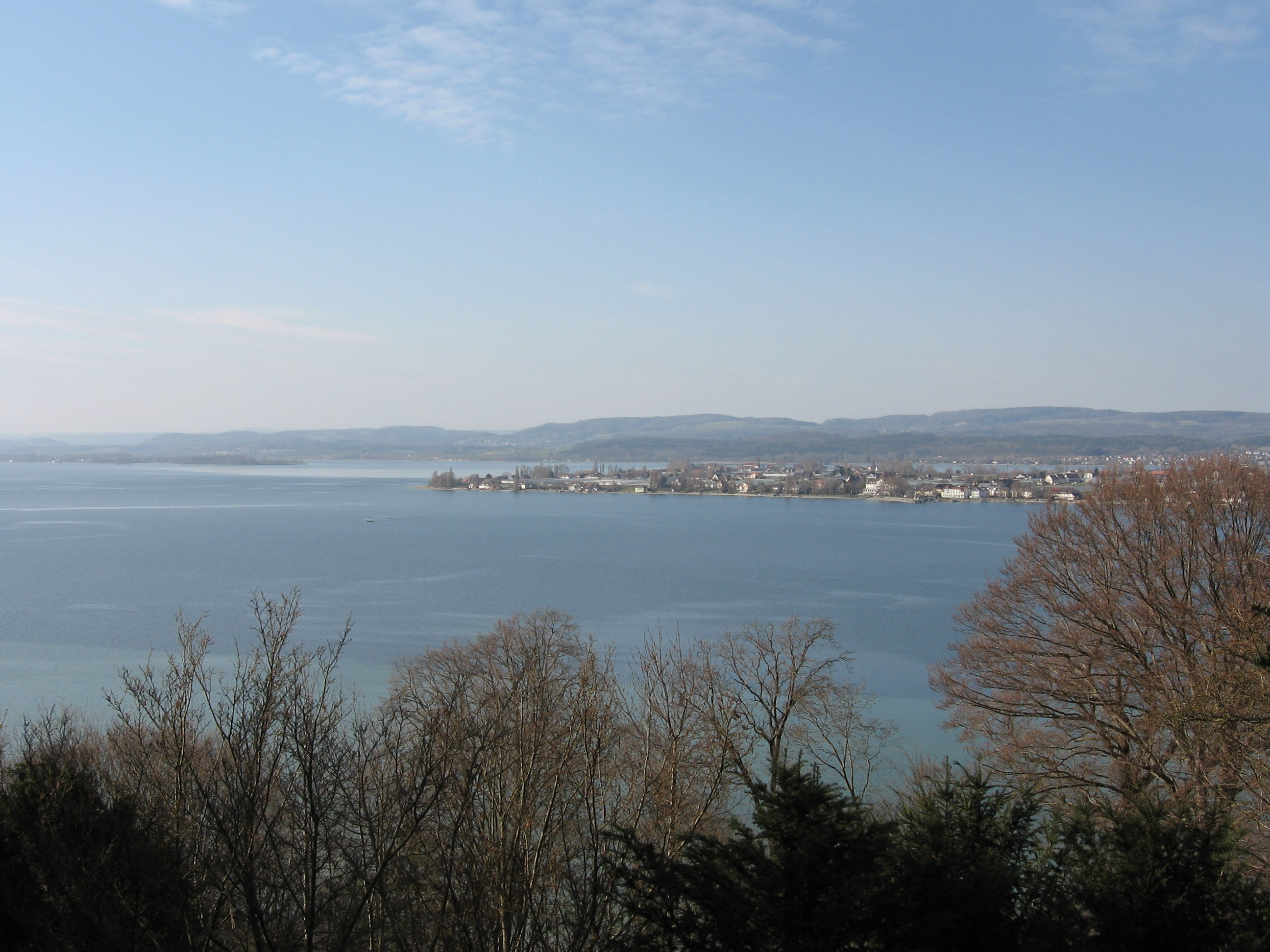
South West Reichenau Island

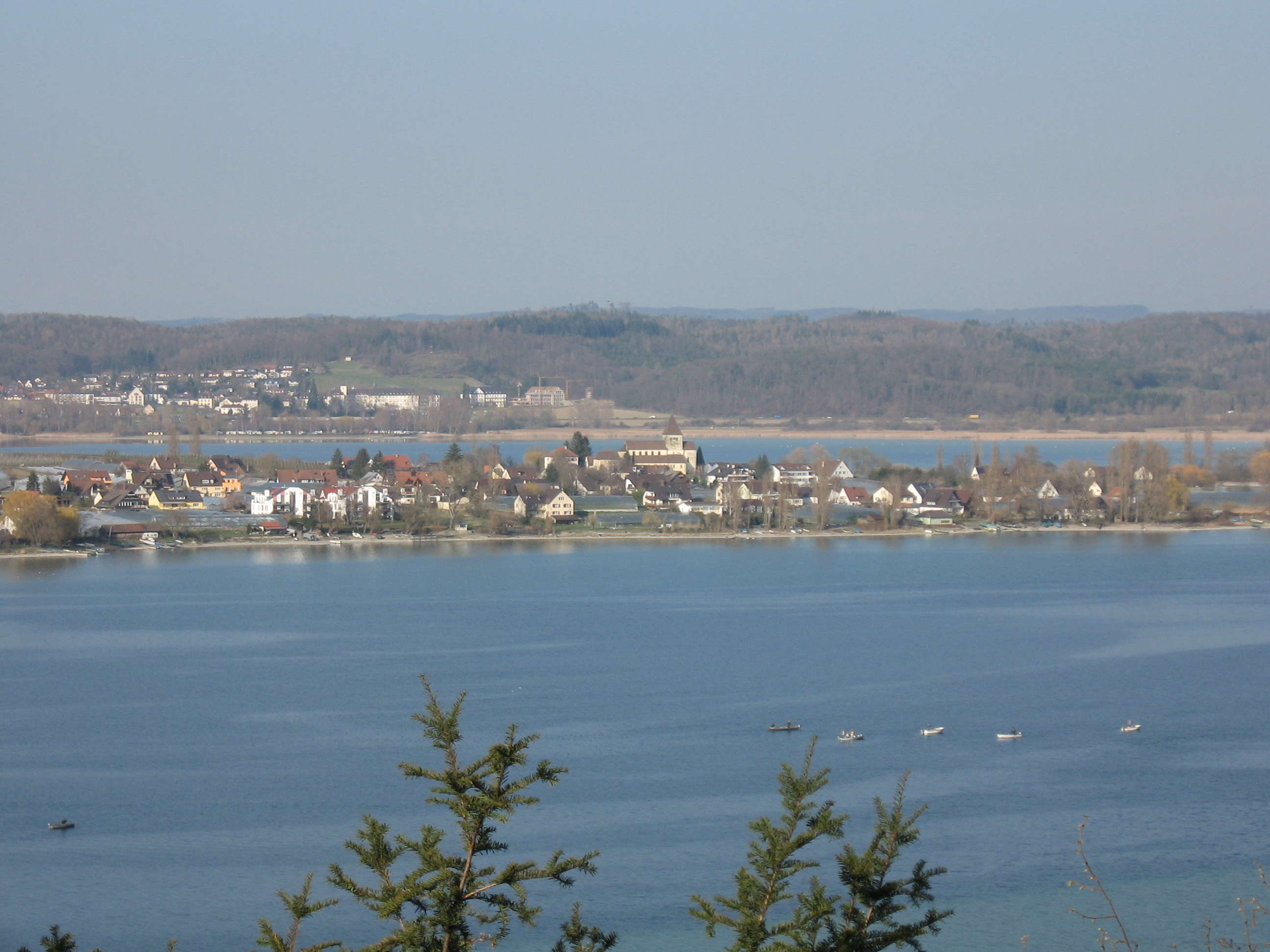
South East Reichenau Island

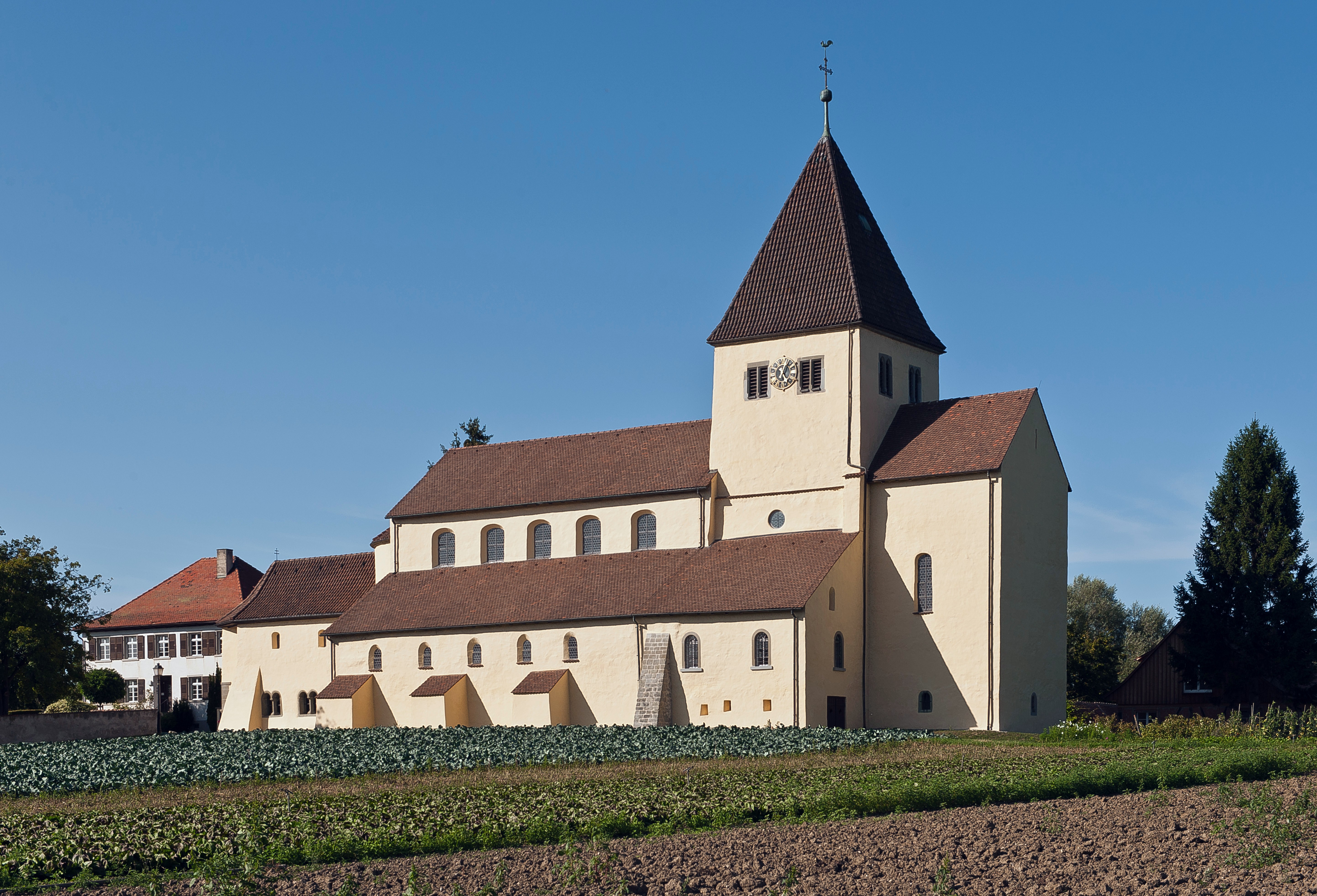
St. Georg, Reichenau-Oberzell

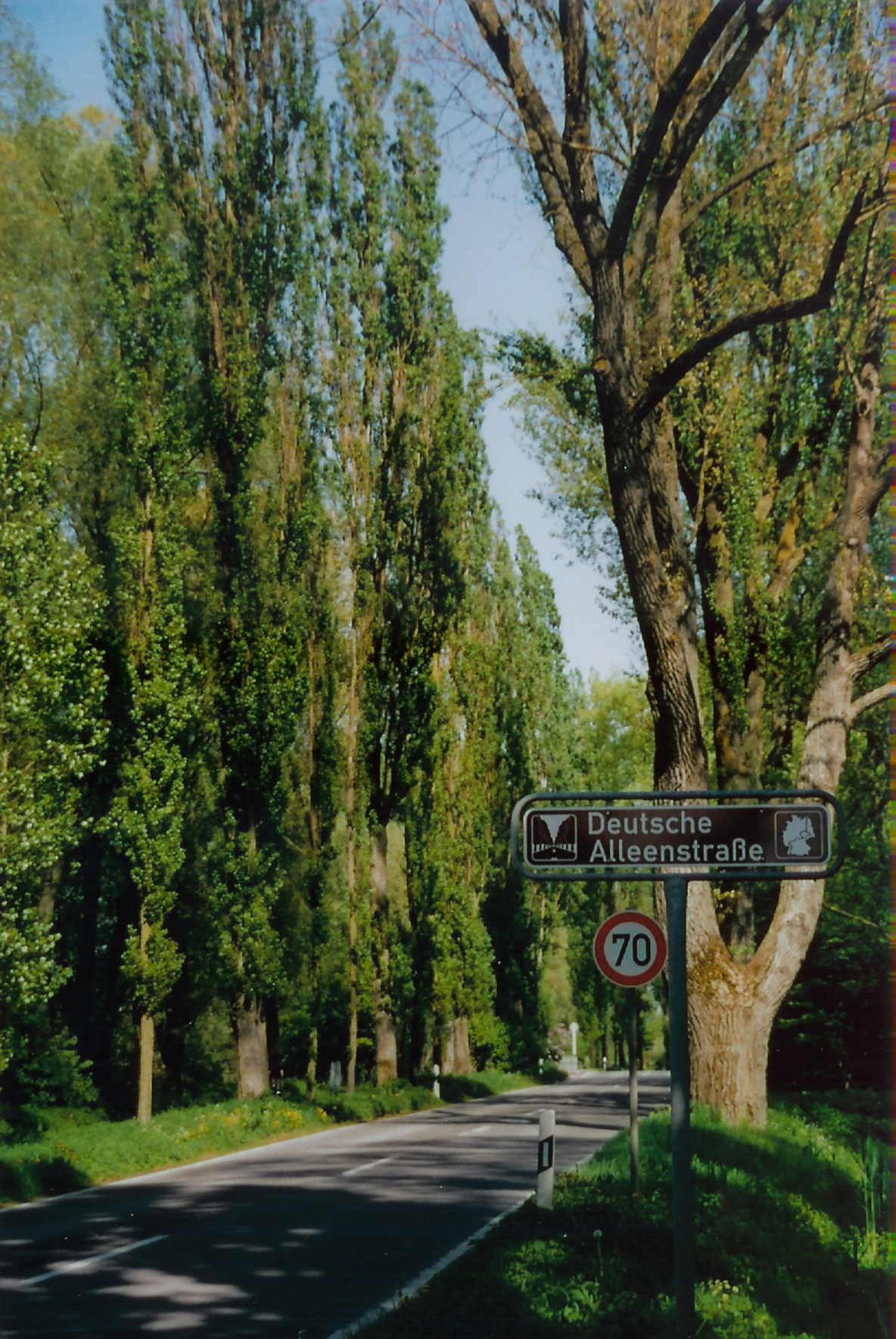
Aspen-lined Avenue to Reichenau Island

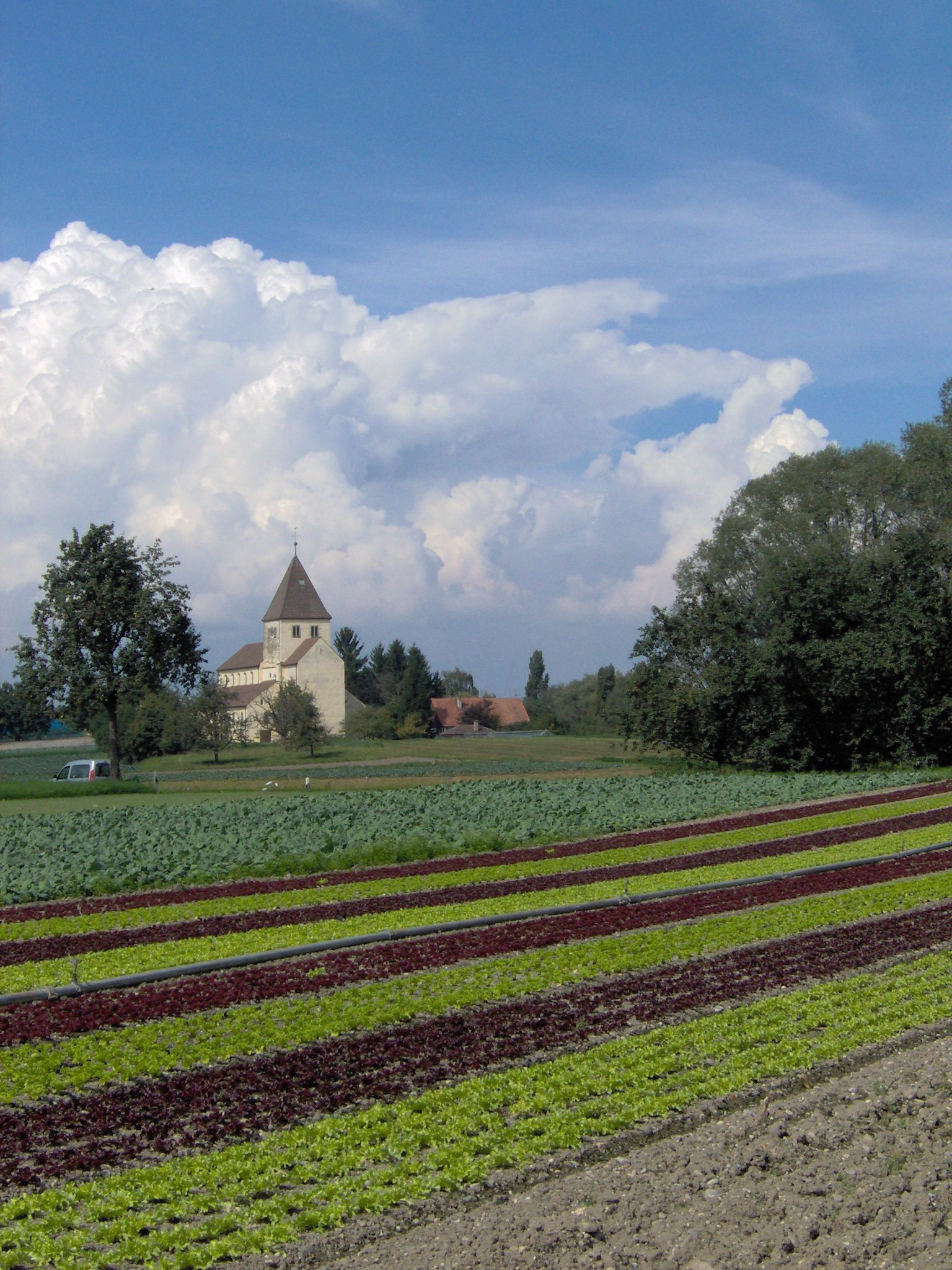
One of the island's many vegetable fields with Sankt Georg Kirche in the background
