= Tägerwilen-Gottlieben railway station =

Train station in Switzerland

Tägerwilen-Gottlieben
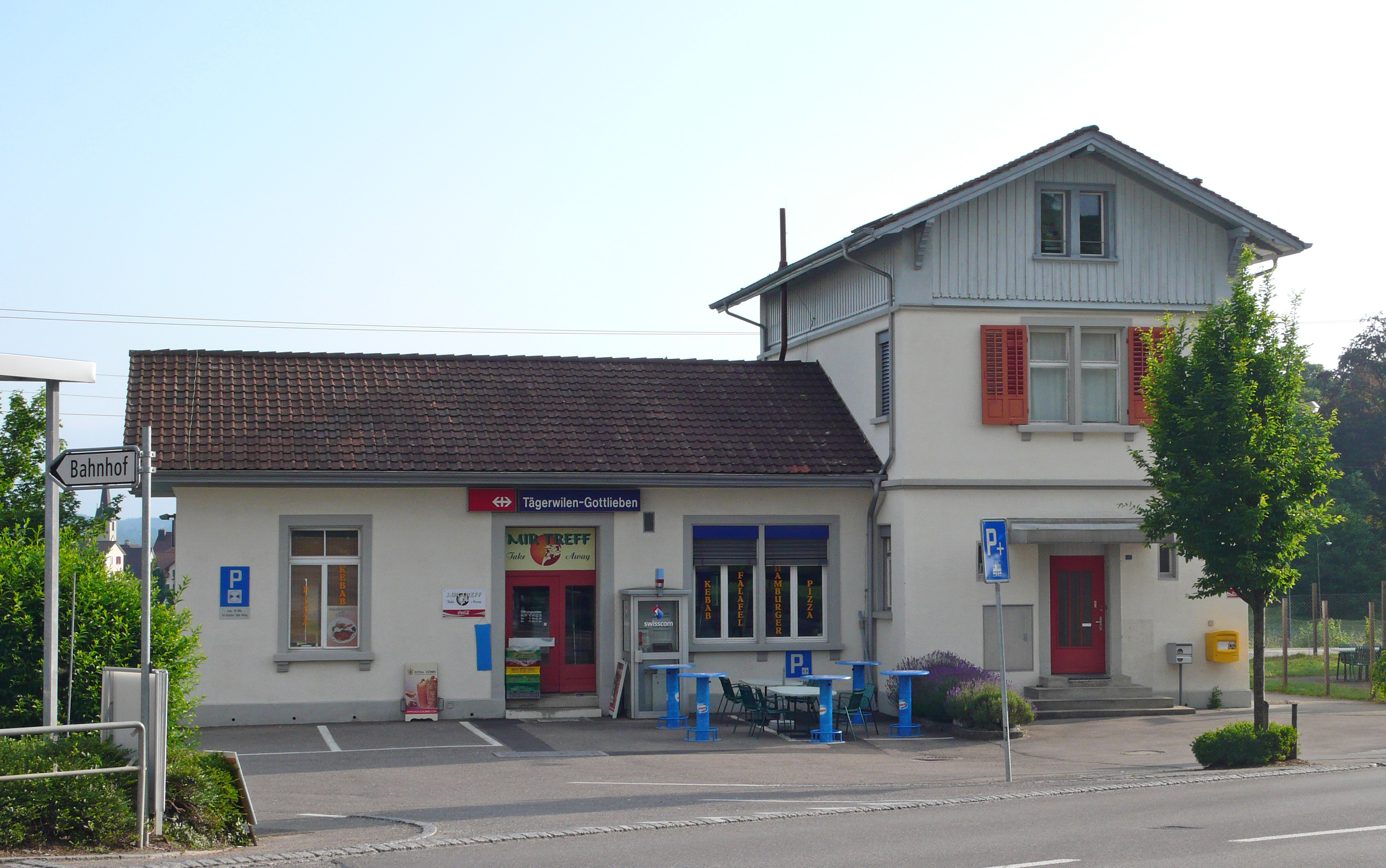
- The station building in 2011

General information
- Location: Tägerwilen; Switzerland
- Coordinates: 47°39′34.621″N 9°7′58.652″E
- Elevation: 404 m (1,325 ft)
- Owner: Swiss Federal Railways
- Line: Lake line
- Train operators: Thurbo

Other information
- Fare zone: 256 (Tarifverbund Ostschweiz)

History
- Former names: Tägerwilen SBB

Services
Preceding station	St. Gallen S-Bahn	Following station
Triboltingen towards Schaffhausen	S1	Kreuzlingen towards Wil
Location
- Location within Switzerland Location within Canton of Thurgau

Tägerwilen-Gottlieben railway station (German: Bahnhof Tägerwilen-Gottlieben) is a railway station in Tägerwilen, in the Swiss canton of Thurgau. It is an intermediate stop on the Lake line and is served by local trains only. It is one of two stations within the municipality of Tägerwilen; the other, Tägerwilen Dorf, is located 950 metres (3,120 ft) away on the Wil–Kreuzlingen line.

== Services ==
Tägerwilen-Gottlieben is served by the S1 of the St. Gallen S-Bahn, as a request stop:

- S1: half-hourly service between Schaffhausen and Wil via St. Gallen.

== See also ==
- Rail transport in Switzerland
