= Tägerwilen Dorf railway station =

Train station in Switzerland

Tägerwilen Dorf
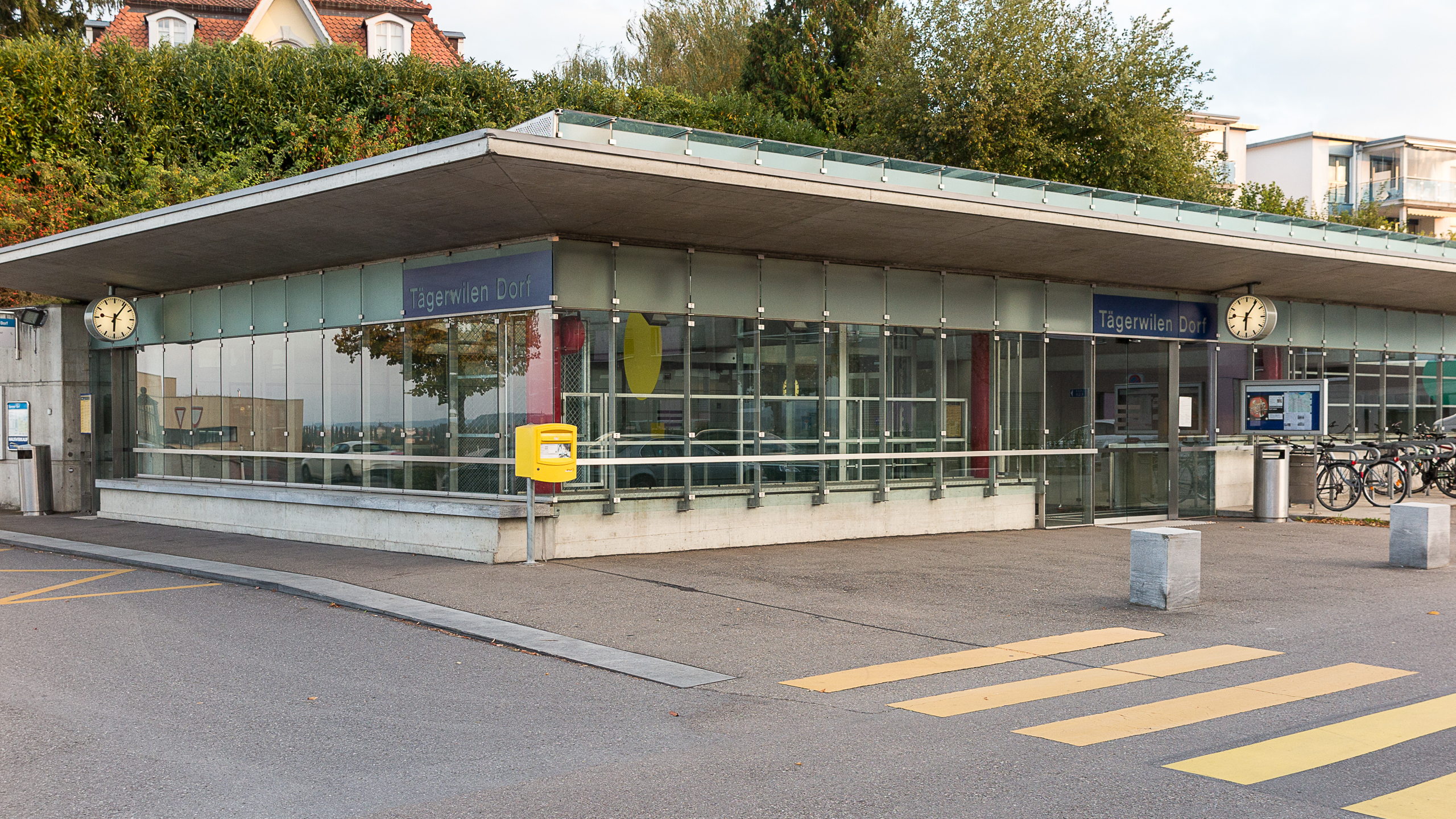
- The station building in 2016

General information
- Location: Tägerwilen; Switzerland
- Coordinates: 47°39′14″N 9°08′24″E
- Elevation: 420 m (1,380 ft)
- Owner: Thurbo
- Line: Wil–Kreuzlingen
- Train operators: Thurbo
- Connections
- Bus: PostAuto bus route 920; Stadtbus Kreuzlingen bus route 907

Other information
- Fare zone: 256 (Tarifverbund Ostschweiz)

History
- Former names: Tägerwilen MThB, Tägerwilen-Oberstrass

Passengers
- 2018: 280 per weekday

Services
Preceding station	St. Gallen S-Bahn	Following station
Kreuzlingen Bernrain towards Weinfelden	S14	Kreuzlingen towards Konstanz
Kreuzlingen Bernrain towards Weinfelden	SN14 Limited service	Kreuzlingen towards Konstanz
Location
- Location within Switzerland Location within Canton of Thurgau

Tägerwilen Dorf railway station (German: Bahnhof Tägerwilen Dorf) is a railway station in the municipality of Tägerwilen, in the Swiss canton of Thurgau. It is an intermediate stop on the standard gauge Wil–Kreuzlingen line of Thurbo, and is served as a request stop by local trains only.

Tägerwilen Dorf is one of two railway stations within the municipality of Tägerwilen; the other, Tägerwilen-Gottlieben, is located 950 metres (3,120 ft) away on the Lake line.

== Services ==
The following services stop at Tägerwilen Dorf:

- St. Gallen S-Bahn S14: half-hourly service between Weinfelden and Konstanz, via Kreuzlingen.

During weekends, the station is served by a nighttime S-Bahn service (SN14), offered by Ostwind tariff network, and operated by Thurbo for St. Gallen S-Bahn.

- St. Gallen S-Bahn SN14: hourly service to Weinfelden and to Konstanz, via Kreuzlingen.

== See also ==
- Bodensee S-Bahn
- Rail transport in Switzerland
