= List of mayors of Kreuzlingen =

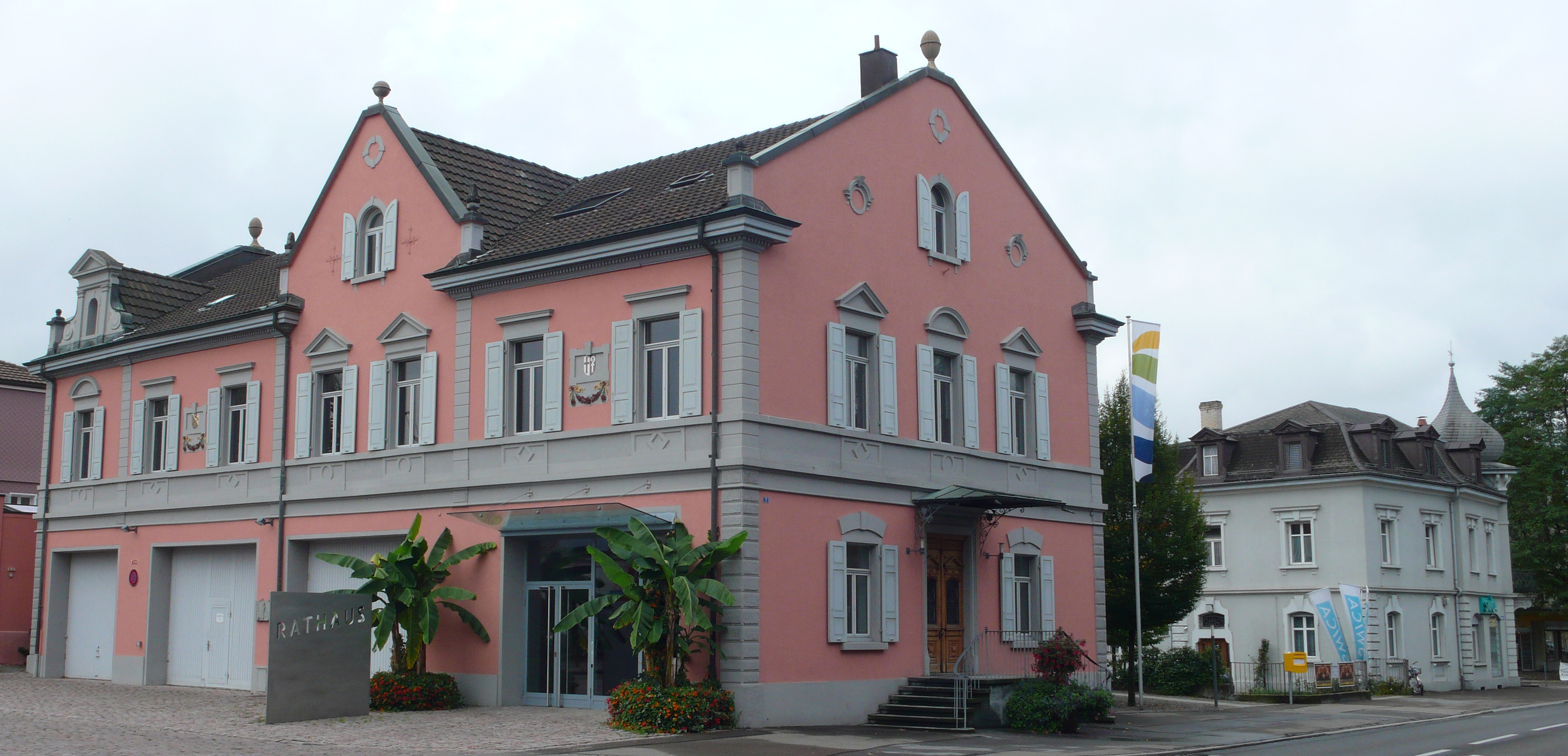
Rathaus Kreuzlingen

Coat of arms of Kreuzlingen

This is a list of mayors of Kreuzlingen, Thurgau, Switzerland. The executive of Kreuzlingen is the city council (Stadtrat). It is presided by the mayor (Stadtammann von Kreuzlingen, earlier Gemeindeammann).

Mayor of Kreuzlingen
Term	Mayor	Lifespan	Party	Notes
1919–1944	Johann Lymann	(1880–1944)		
	Walter Huwyler	(1893–1969)		
1958–1972	Alfred Abegg	(1914–1998)		
1972–1989	Emil Heeb	(1924-2021)		
1989–2007	Josef Bieri	(born 1943)	CVP/PDC	
2007–2017	Andreas Netzle	(born 1959)	independent	
2018-present	Thomas Niederberger	(born 1970)	independent	
