= Kurzrickenbach Seepark railway station =

Train station in Switzerland

Kurzrickenbach Seepark
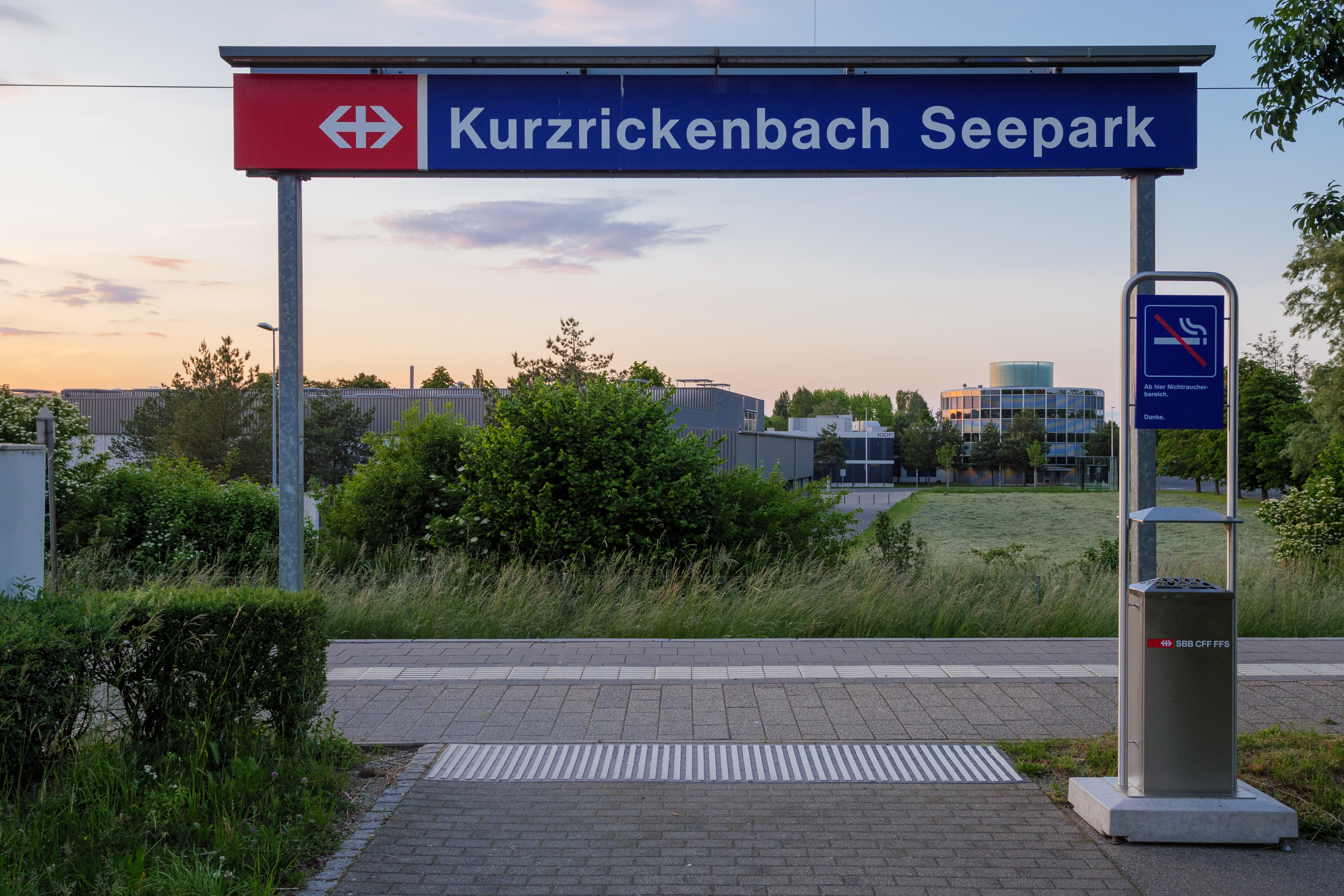

General information
- Location: Kreuzlingen; Switzerland
- Coordinates: 47°38′35.106″N 9°11′46.860″E
- Elevation: 403 m (1,322 ft)
- Owner: Swiss Federal Railways
- Line: Lake line
- Train operators: Thurbo

Other information
- Fare zone: 256 (Tarifverbund Ostschweiz)

Services
Preceding station	St. Gallen S-Bahn	Following station
Kreuzlingen Hafen towards Schaffhausen	S1	Bottighofen towards Wil
Kreuzlingen Hafen towards Kreuzlingen	SN71 Limited service	Bottighofen towards Romanshorn
Location
- Location within Switzerland Location within Canton of Thurgau

Kurzrickenbach Seepark railway station (German: Bahnhof Kurzrickenbach Seepark) is a railway station in Kreuzlingen, in the Swiss canton of Thurgau. It is an intermediate stop on the Lake line and is served as a request stop by local trains only.

It is one of four railway stations in the municipality of Kreuzlingen, the others being Kreuzlingen, Kreuzlingen Bernrain, and Kreuzlingen Hafen.

== Services ==
Kurzrickenbach Seepark is served by the S1 of the St. Gallen S-Bahn:

- S1: half-hourly service between Schaffhausen and Wil via St. Gallen.

During weekends, the station is served by a nighttime S-Bahn service (SN71), offered by Ostwind fare network, and operated by Thurbo for St. Gallen S-Bahn.

- St. Gallen S-Bahn SN71: hourly service to Romanshorn and to Kreuzlingen.

== See also ==
- Bodensee S-Bahn
- Rail transport in Switzerland
