= Kreuzlingen Hafen railway station =

Train station in Switzerland

Kreuzlingen Hafen
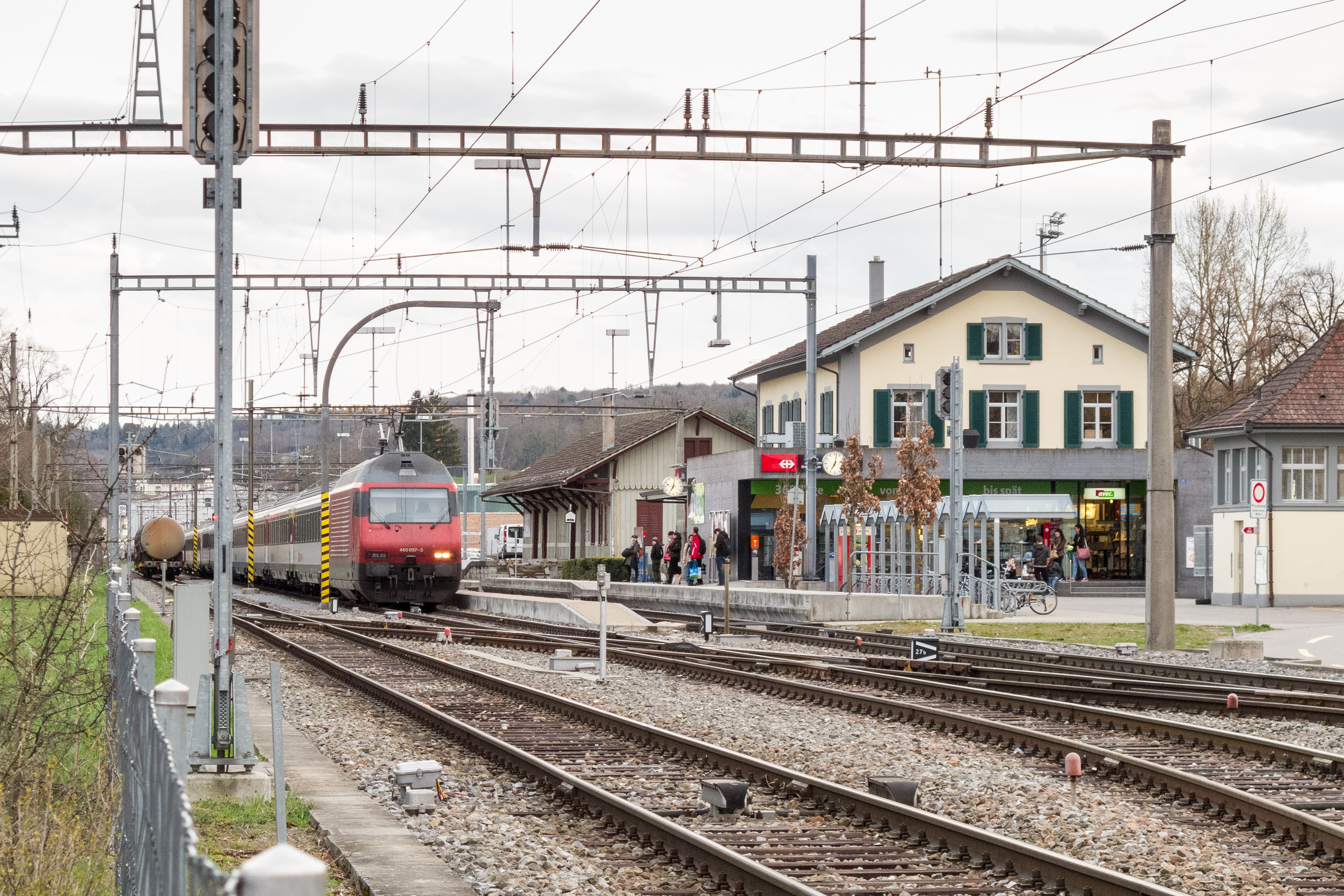
- The station building in 2013

General information
- Location: Kreuzlingen; Switzerland
- Coordinates: 47°38′57.005″N 9°10′55.060″E
- Elevation: 402 m (1,319 ft)
- Owner: Swiss Federal Railways
- Line: Lake line
- Platforms: 2 side platforms
- Tracks: 3
- Train operators: Thurbo
- Connections
- Ship: URh passenger ships
- Bus: PostAuto and local bus routes

Other information
- Fare zone: 256 (Tarifverbund Ostschweiz)

History
- Former names: Kreuzlingen

Services
Preceding station	St. Gallen S-Bahn	Following station
Kreuzlingen towards Schaffhausen	S1	Kurzrickenbach Seepark towards Wil
Kreuzlingen Terminus	SN71 Limited service	Kurzrickenbach Seepark towards Romanshorn
Preceding station	Thurbo	Following station
Konstanz Terminus	RE1	Romanshorn towards Herisau
Location
- Location within Switzerland Location within Canton of Thurgau

Kreuzlingen Hafen railway station (German: Bahnhof Kreuzlingen Hafen, lit. 'Kreuzlingen Harbour Station') is a railway station in Kreuzlingen, in the Swiss canton of Thurgau. It is an intermediate stop on the Lake line and is served by local trains only.

The station is located near a landing stage that is served by URh boat lines to Schaffhausen, via Konstanz and Stein am Rhein.

It is one of four railway stations in the municipality of Kreuzlingen, the others being Kreuzlingen, Kreuzlingen Bernrain, and Kurzrickenbach Seepark.

== Services ==
Kreuzlingen Hafen is served by the S1 and RE1 of the St. Gallen S-Bahn:

- RE1: hourly service between Konstanz and Herisau via Romanshorn and St. Gallen.
- S1: half-hourly service between Schaffhausen and Wil via St. Gallen.

During weekends, the station is served by a nighttime S-Bahn service (SN71), offered by Ostwind fare network, and operated by Thurbo for St. Gallen S-Bahn.

- St. Gallen S-Bahn SN71: hourly service to Romanshorn and to Kreuzlingen.

== See also ==
- Bodensee S-Bahn
- Rail transport in Switzerland
