= Kreuzlingen =

- Municipality
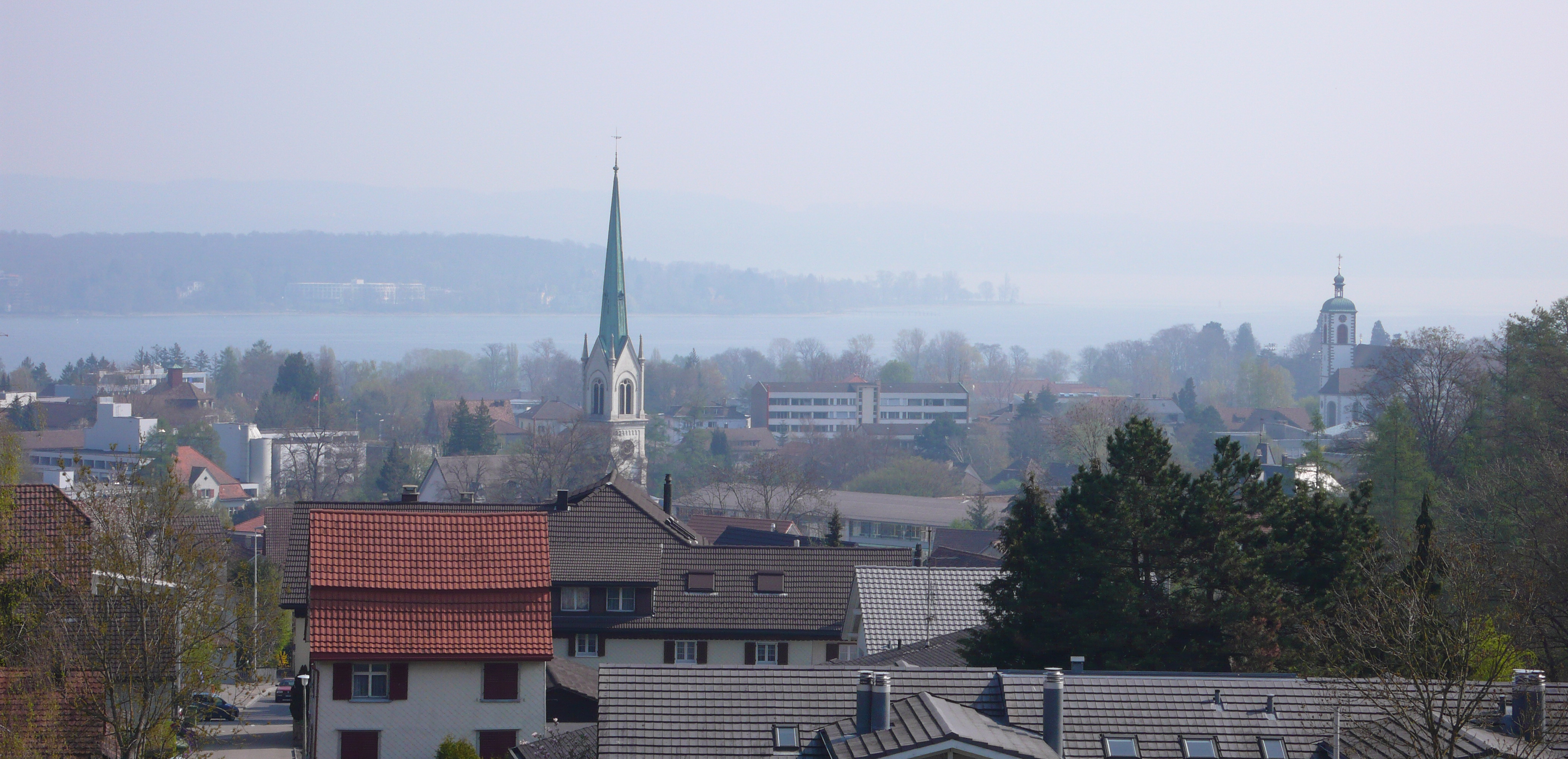
- Kreuzlingen in April 2010

- Coat of arms
- Location of Kreuzlingen
- Location within Switzerland Location within Canton of Thurgau
- Coordinates: 47°38′N 9°10′E
- Country: Switzerland
- Canton: Thurgau
- District: Kreuzlingen

Government
  - Executive: Stadtrat with 5 members
  - Mayor: Stadtammann (list); Thomas Niederberger (as of March 2018)
  - Parliament: Gemeinderat with 40 members

Area
  - Total: 11.5 km^{2} (4.4 sq mi)
- Elevation: 397 m (1,302 ft)

Population (31. December 2025)
  - Total: 23,359
  - Density: 2,030/km^{2} (5,260/sq mi)
- Time zone: UTC+01:00 (CET)
  - Summer (DST): UTC+02:00 (CEST)
- Postal code: 8280
- SFOS number: 4671
- ISO 3166 code: CH-TG
- Localities: Emmishofen, Kurzrickenbach
- Surrounded by: Bottighofen, Constance (Konstanz) (DE-BW), Kemmental, Lengwil, Tägerwilen
- Twin towns: Wolfach (Germany), Cisternino (Italy)
- Website: www.kreuzlingen.ch

Kreuzlingen (Swiss Standard German pronunciation: [ˈkrɔʏtslɪŋən]) is a municipality in the district of Kreuzlingen in the canton of Thurgau in north-eastern Switzerland. It is the seat of the district and is the second-largest city of the canton, after Frauenfeld, with a population of about 22,000. Together with the adjoining city of Konstanz just across the border in Germany, Kreuzlingen is part of the largest conurbation on Lake Constance with a population of almost 120,000.

== History ==
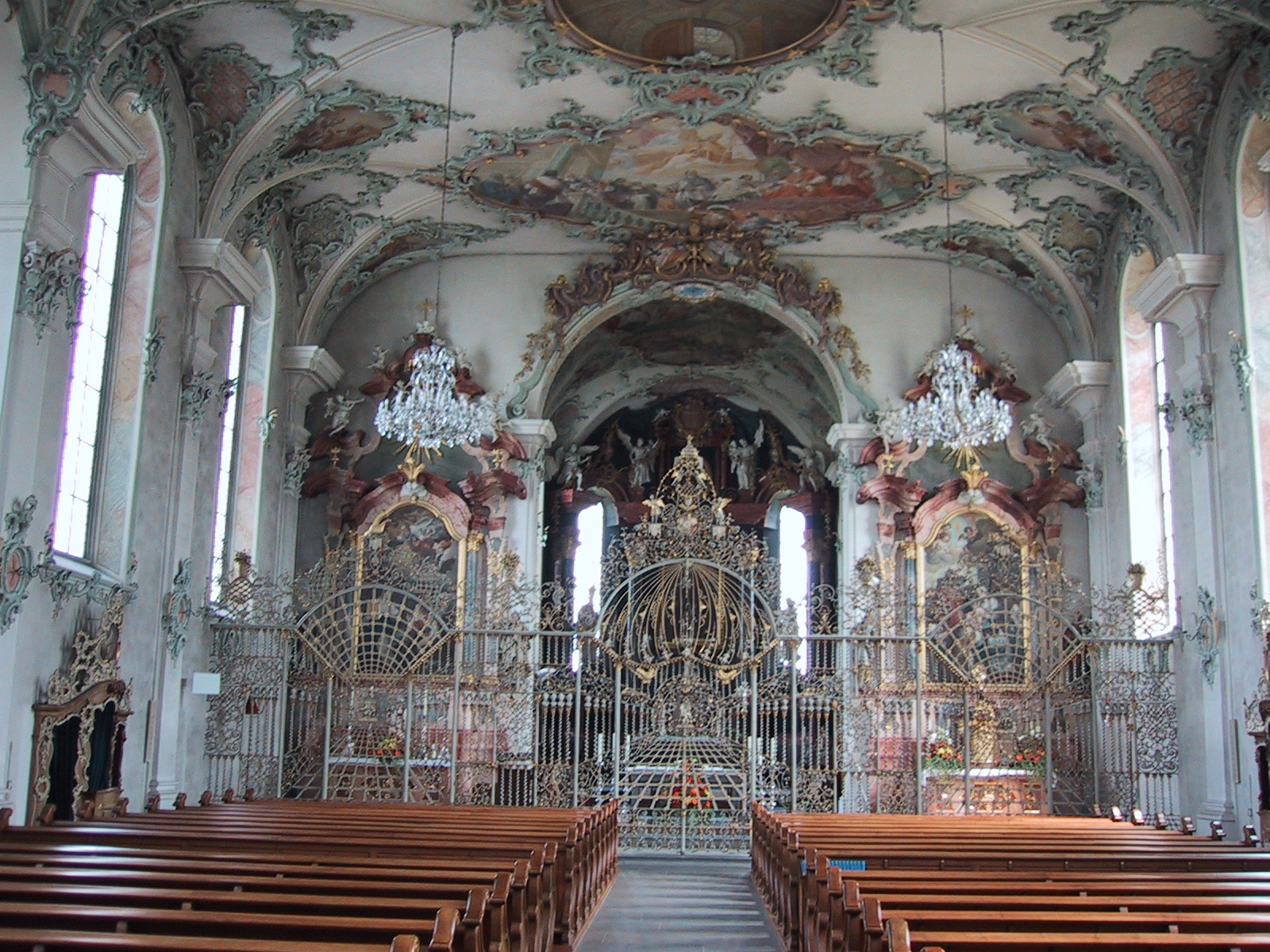
Interior of St. Ulrich Church

The name of the municipality stems from the Augustinian monastery Crucelin, later Kreuzlingen Abbey. It was founded in 1125 by the Bishop of Constance Ulrich I. In the Swabian War and the 30 Years' War after the siege of Constance by Swedish troops, the Augustinian monastery was burned down by the people of Constance, who blamed the monks for having supported the enemy. In 1650, the monastery was rebuilt in its present location. With secularization in 1848, the buildings became a teachers' school. The chapel became a Catholic church.

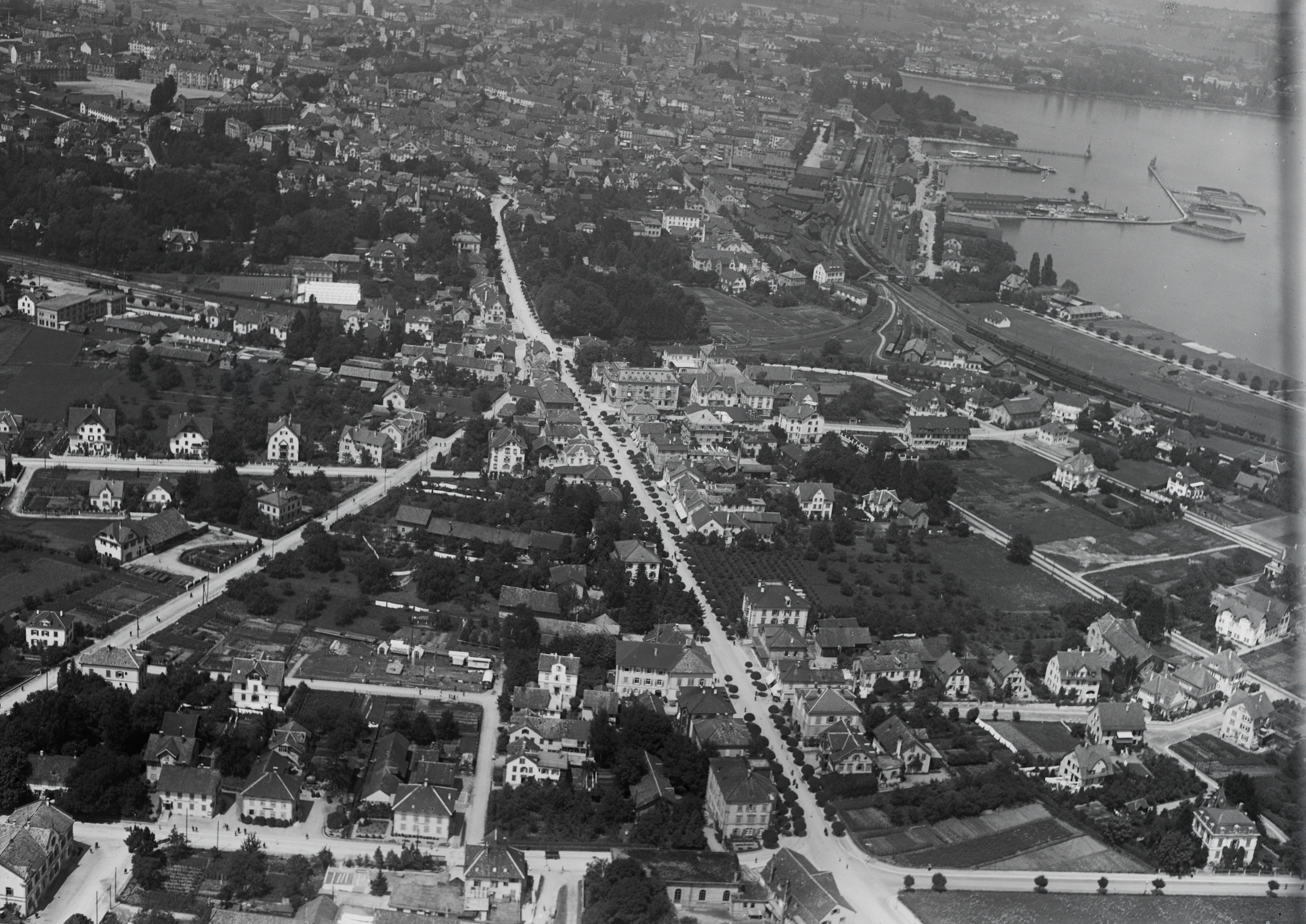
Aerial view from 200 m by Walter Mittelholzer (1919)

The area was already settled during the Bronze Age. Celtic and Roman coins and artifacts testify of continued settlement. Kurzrickenbach is first mentioned as Rihinbah in 830, Egelshofen as Eigolteshoven in 1125, and Emmishofen as Eminshoven in 1159. The territory of the municipality, except for the Augustinian monastery, belonged to the Bishop of Constance. When the Eidgenossen conquered Thurgau in 1460 and further with the Reformation, the ties to the neighboring city loosened.

Until the beginning of the 19th century, the present center of Kreuzlingen was still largely agricultural. The first steamboats began to operate on Lake Constance in 1824. The first train line to Romanshorn was finished in 1871, and the second to Etzwilen in 1875. This brought commerce and industry to the region.

In 1874, the municipality of Egelshofen was renamed Kreuzlingen and became the capital of the district, instead of Gottlieben. It reached its present size with the incorporation of Kurzrickenbach in 1927 and Emmishofen in 1928. However, until World War I, Kreuzlingen was a kind of suburb of Constance. Most of its industry was in the hands of German firms. The war made Kreuzlingen more independent. In 1947 Kreuzlingen passed the mark of 10,000 residents, thus becoming according to Swiss statistical convention a town.

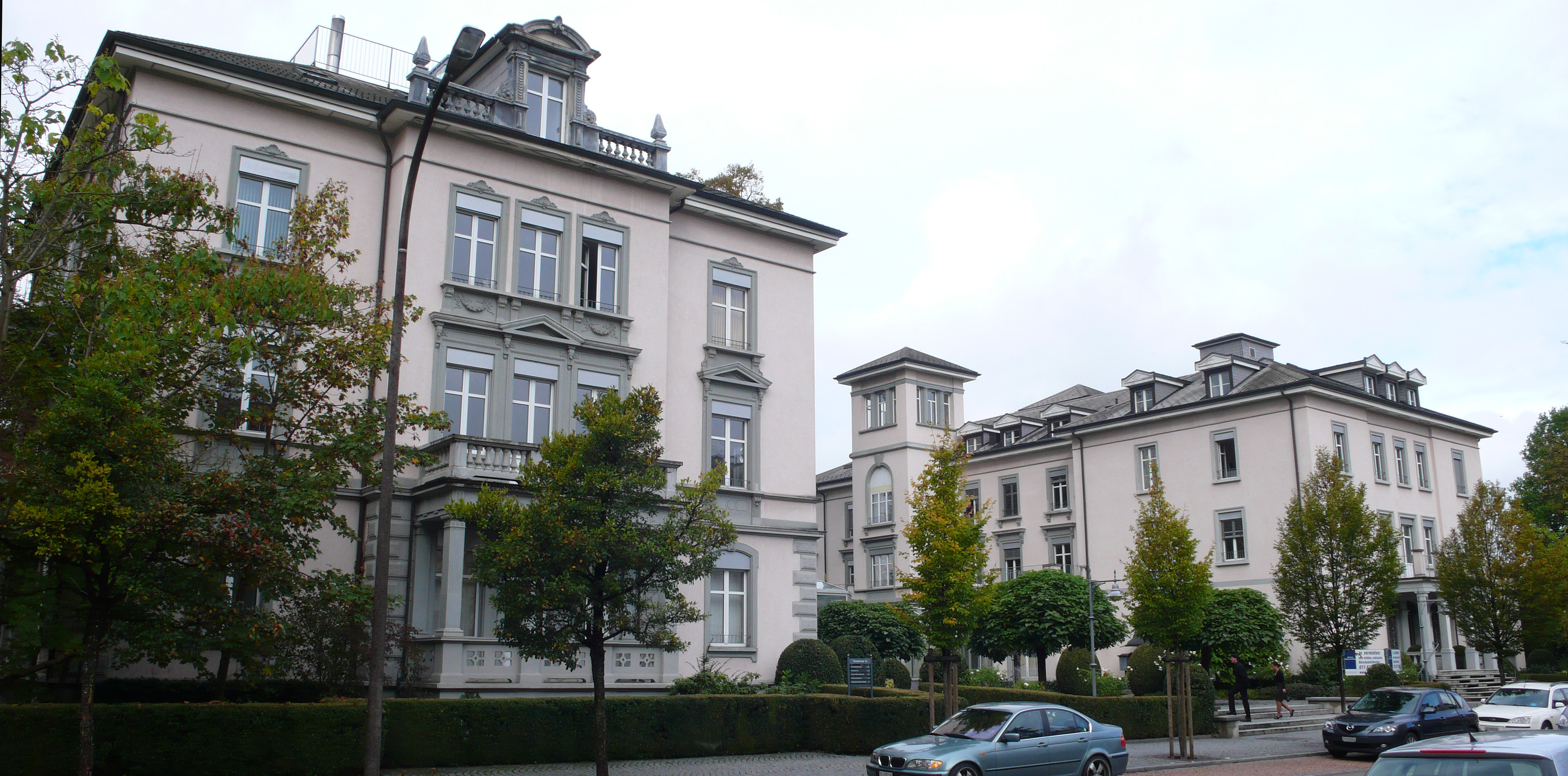
Part of the former Sanatorium

The Sanatorium of Bellevue (1857–1980), which occupied part of the old monastery, played an important role in the history of Kreuzlingen. In 1842, Ignaz Vanotti from Constance bought a large tract of land and built a residential and commercial building in 1843 to house the emigrant press of Bellevue, which had previously been located in Römerburg. In 1857, Ludwig Binswanger, a psychiatrist from Münsterlingen acquired the property and opened a private sanatorium. The clinic was very modern and remained in the control of the Binswanger family for nearly 120 years. Important psychiatric advances, particularly under the founder's grandson, also called Ludwig Binswanger, especially in the development of existential psychotherapy, were made at the sanatorium. However, few of its buildings remain.

== Geography ==
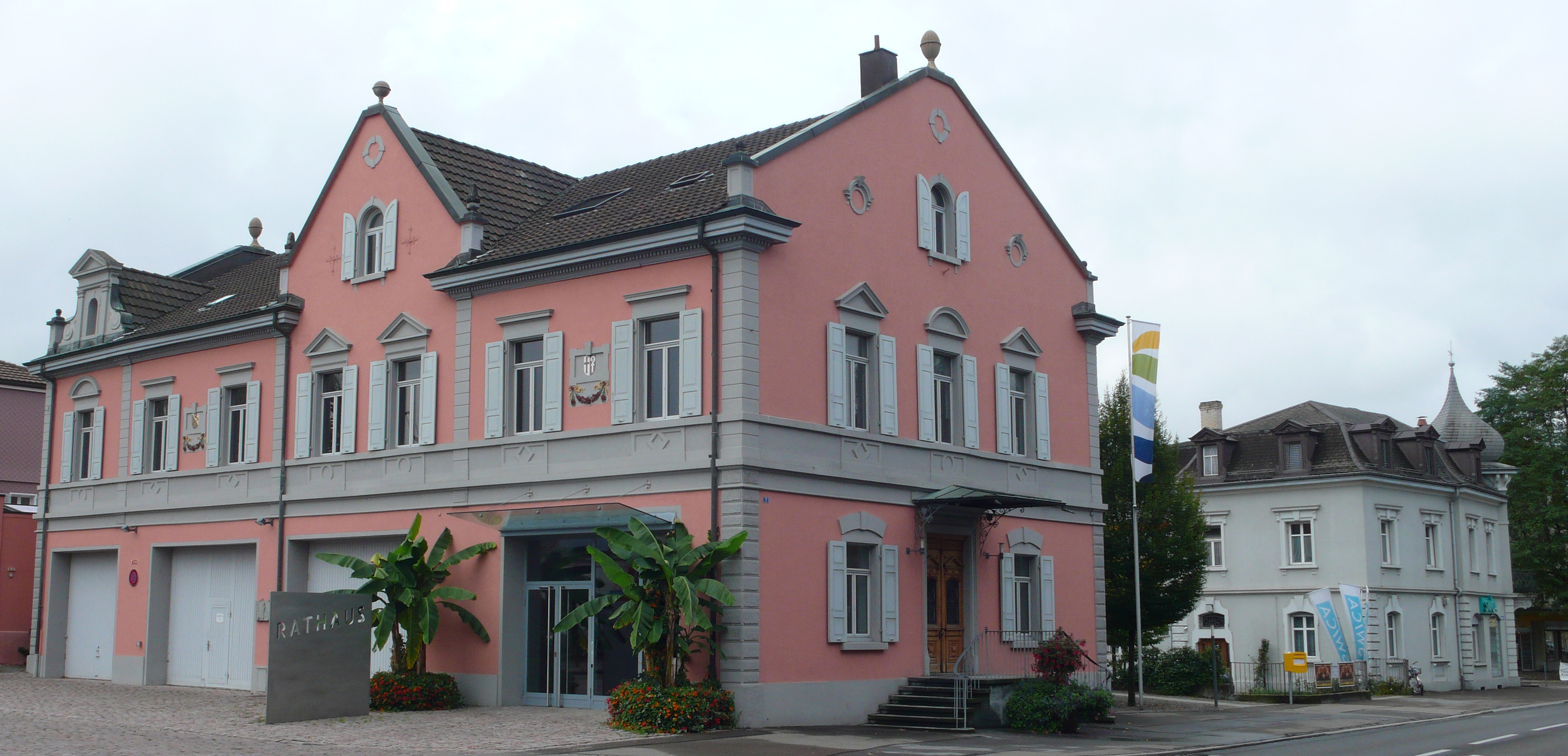
Kreuzlingen town hall

Kreuzlingen has an area, as of 2009, of 11.49 square kilometers (4.44 sq mi). Of this area, 3.13 km^{2} (1.21 sq mi) or 27.2% is used for agricultural purposes, while 3.24 km^{2} (1.25 sq mi) or 28.2% is forested. Of the rest of the land, 4.87 km^{2} (1.88 sq mi) or 42.4% is settled (buildings or roads), 0.11 km^{2} (27 acres) or 1.0% is either rivers or lakes and 0.13 km^{2} (32 acres) or 1.1% is unproductive land.

Of the built-up area, industrial buildings made up 22.3% of the total area while housing and buildings made up 5.7% and transportation infrastructure made up 0.7%. Power and water infrastructure as well as other special developed areas made up 5.3% of the area while parks, green belts and sports fields made up 8.4%. Out of the forested land, 26.8% of the total land area is heavily forested and 1.4% is covered with orchards or small clusters of trees. Of the agricultural land, 25.1% is used for growing crops, while 2.2% is used for orchards or vine crops. All the water in the municipality is in lakes. Of the unproductive areas, 1.1% is unproductive vegetation and .

The municipality is located in the Kreuzlingen district on the border with the German city of Konstanz. It is located on Lake Constance where it narrows to form the Untersee, bordering with Konstanz in Germany. It is halfway between Schaffhausen and Rorschach on a slightly southward-dipping west–east axis. It consists of the former villages of Bernrain, Egelshofen, Emmishofen and Kurzrickenbach.

== Demographics ==
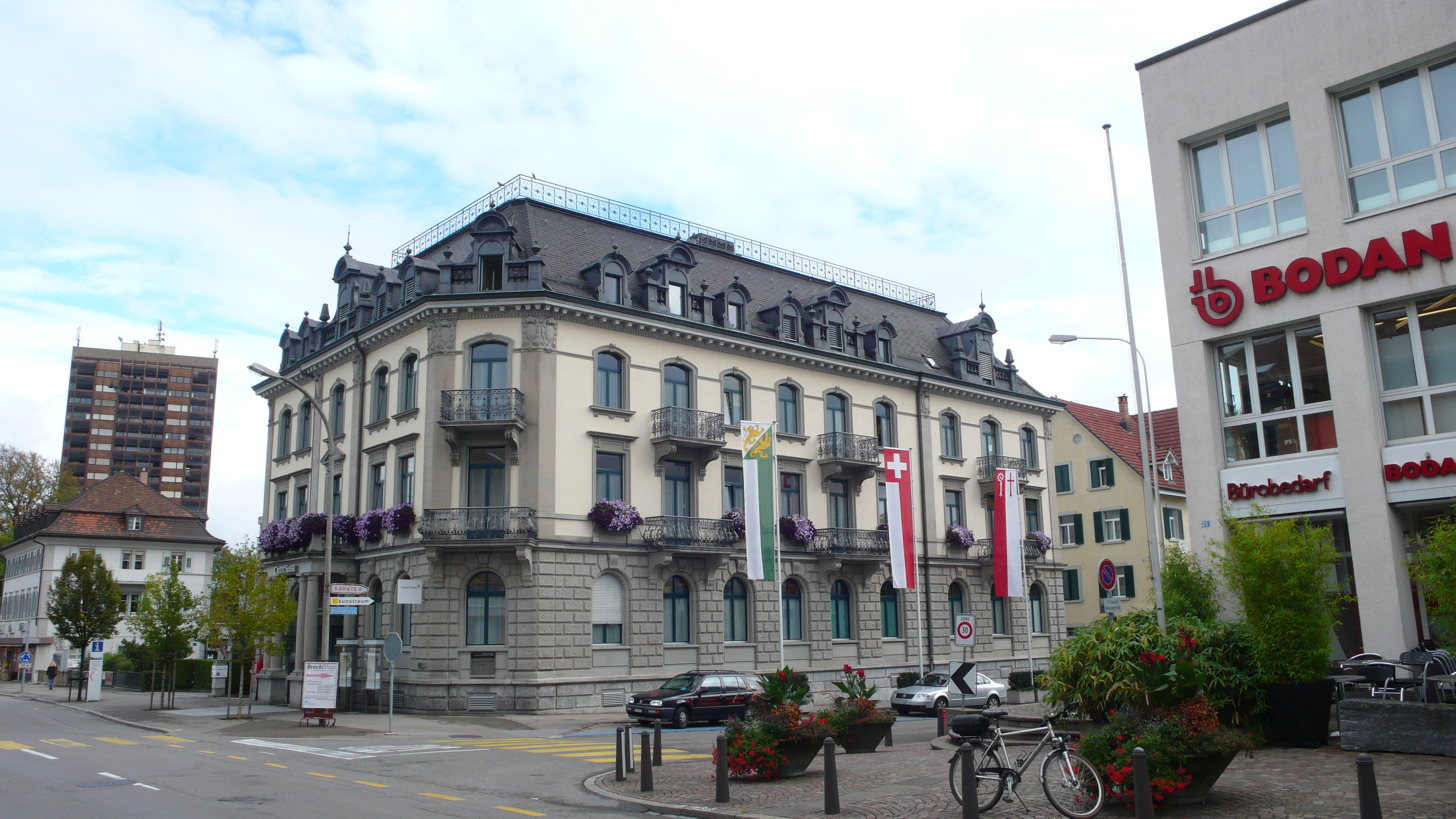
Main street in Kreuzlingen

Kreuzlingen has a population (as of December 2020) of 22,390. As of 2008, 48.1% of the population are foreign nationals. Over the last 10 years (1997–2007) the population has changed at a rate of 2.2%. Most of the population (as of 2000) speaks German (79.7%), with Italian being second most common (5.2%) and Albanian being third (3.8%).

As of 2008, the gender distribution of the population was 49.2% male and 50.8% female. The population was made up of 4,409 Swiss men (23.8% of the population), and 4,715 (25.5%) non-Swiss men. There were 5,208 Swiss women (28.1%), and 4,194 (22.6%) non-Swiss women.

In 2008, there were 73 live births to Swiss citizens and 95 births to non-Swiss citizens, and in same time span there were 137 deaths of Swiss citizens and 29 non-Swiss citizen deaths. Ignoring immigration and emigration, the population of Swiss citizens decreased by 64 while the foreign population increased by 66. There was 1 Swiss man, 2 Swiss women who emigrated from Switzerland to another country, 299 non-Swiss men who emigrated from Switzerland to another country and 263 non-Swiss women who emigrated from Switzerland to another country. The total Swiss population change in 2008 (from all sources) was a decrease of 168 and the non-Swiss population change was an increase of 442 people. This represents a population growth rate of 1.5%.

The age distribution, as of 2009, in Kreuzlingen is; 1,651 children or 8.7% of the population are between 0 and 9 years old and 1,908 teenagers or 10.1% are between 10 and 19. Of the adult population, 2,753 people or 14.5% of the population are between 20 and 29 years old. 2,588 people or 13.7% are between 30 and 39, 3,201 people or 16.9% are between 40 and 49, and 2,536 people or 13.4% are between 50 and 59. The senior population distribution is 2,076 people or 11.0% of the population are between 60 and 69 years old, 1,393 people or 7.4% are between 70 and 79, there are 712 people or 3.8% who are between 80 and 89, and there are 115 people or 0.6% who are 90 and older.

As of 2000, there were 7,643 private households in the municipality, and an average of 2.1 persons per household. In 2000, there were 1,233 single-family homes (or 58.4% of the total) out of a total of 2,111 inhabited buildings. There were 196 two-family buildings (9.3%), 148 three-family buildings (7.0%) and 534 multi-family buildings (or 25.3%). There were 4,031 (or 23.5%) persons who were part of a couple without children, and 7,659 (or 44.7%) who were part of a couple with children. There were 1,037 (or 6.1%) people who lived in a single-parent home, while there are 77 persons who were adult children living with one or both parents, 59 persons who lived in a household made up of relatives, 311 who lived in a household made up of unrelated persons, and 860 who are either institutionalized or live in another type of collective housing. The vacancy rate for the municipality, in 2008, was 1.06%.

In the 2007 federal election the most popular party was the SVP which received 35.92% of the vote. The next three most popular parties were the SP (17.41%), the CVP (16.13%) and the Green Party (12.99%). In the federal election, a total of 3,633 votes were cast, and the voter turnout was 42.9%.

The historical population is given in the following table:

year	population
1831	661 ^{a}
1870	1,471 ^{a}
1880	2,426
1920	5,740
1930	8,615
1950	10,045

^a Population of Egelshofen

== Heritage sites of national significance ==
The Former Augustinian Chorherrenstift of St Ulrich, the former granary and wine press at Seeburgscheune and Seeburg Castle are listed as Swiss heritage site of national significance. The Untersee region is part of the Inventory of Swiss Heritage Sites.

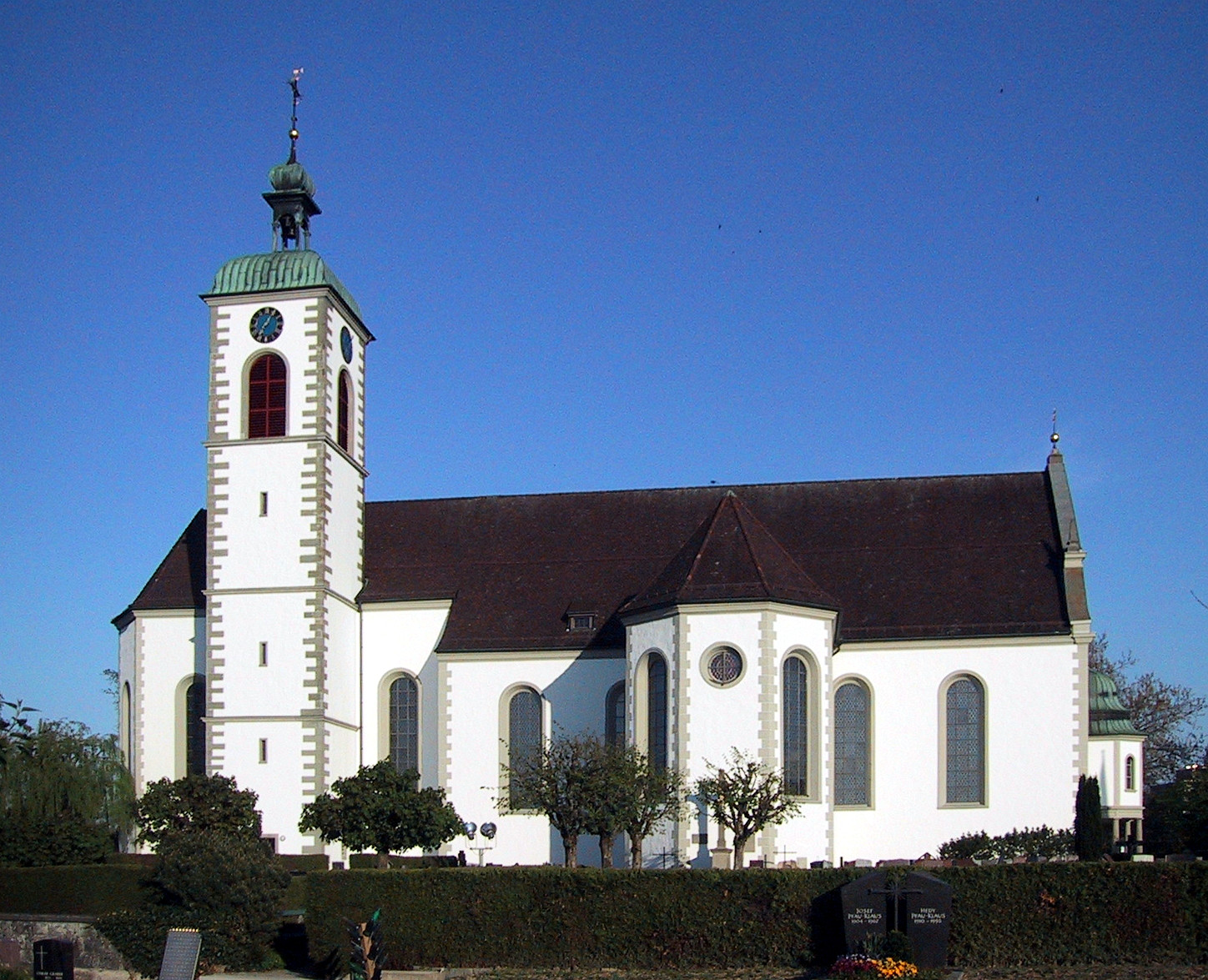
St. Ulrich

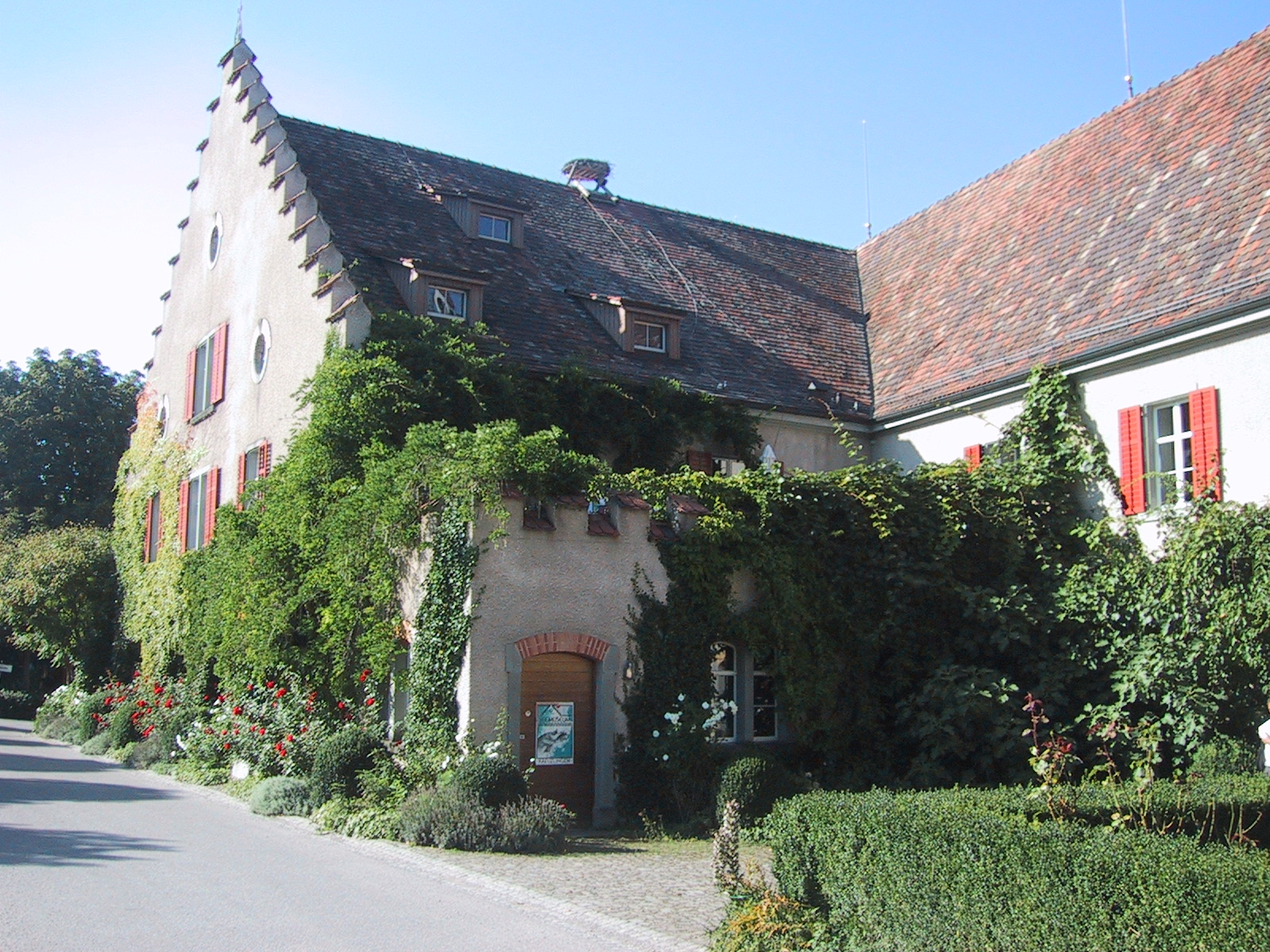
Seemuseum

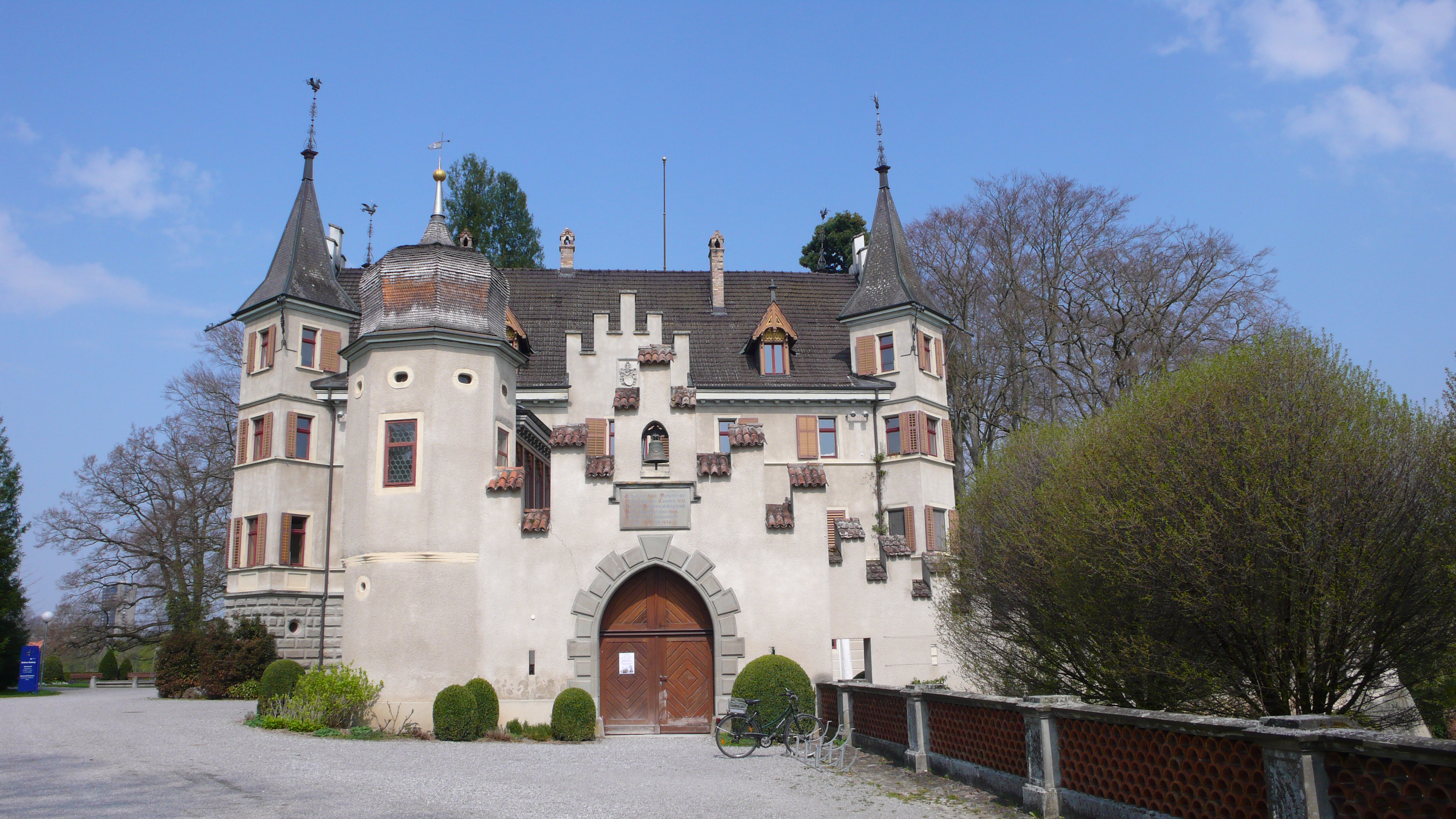
Seeburg Castle

== Economy ==
Earlier, the majority of the inhabitants made a living in the wine industry. However, because of diseases and bad harvests, the last wine grapes were raised in Kreuzlingen in 1938. The local economy is largely commercial and manufacturing, with the largest employer being a clothing manufacturer.

As of 2007, Kreuzlingen had an unemployment rate of 3.54%. As of 2005, there were 92 people employed in the primary economic sector and about 20 businesses involved in this sector. 2,799 people are employed in the secondary sector and there are 183 businesses in this sector. 6,042 people are employed in the tertiary sector, with 821 businesses in this sector. In 2000, there were 11,275 workers who lived in the municipality. Of these, 3,510 or about 31.1% of the residents worked outside Kreuzlingen while 4,725 people commuted into the municipality for work. There were a total of 12,490 jobs (of at least 6 hours per week) in the municipality.

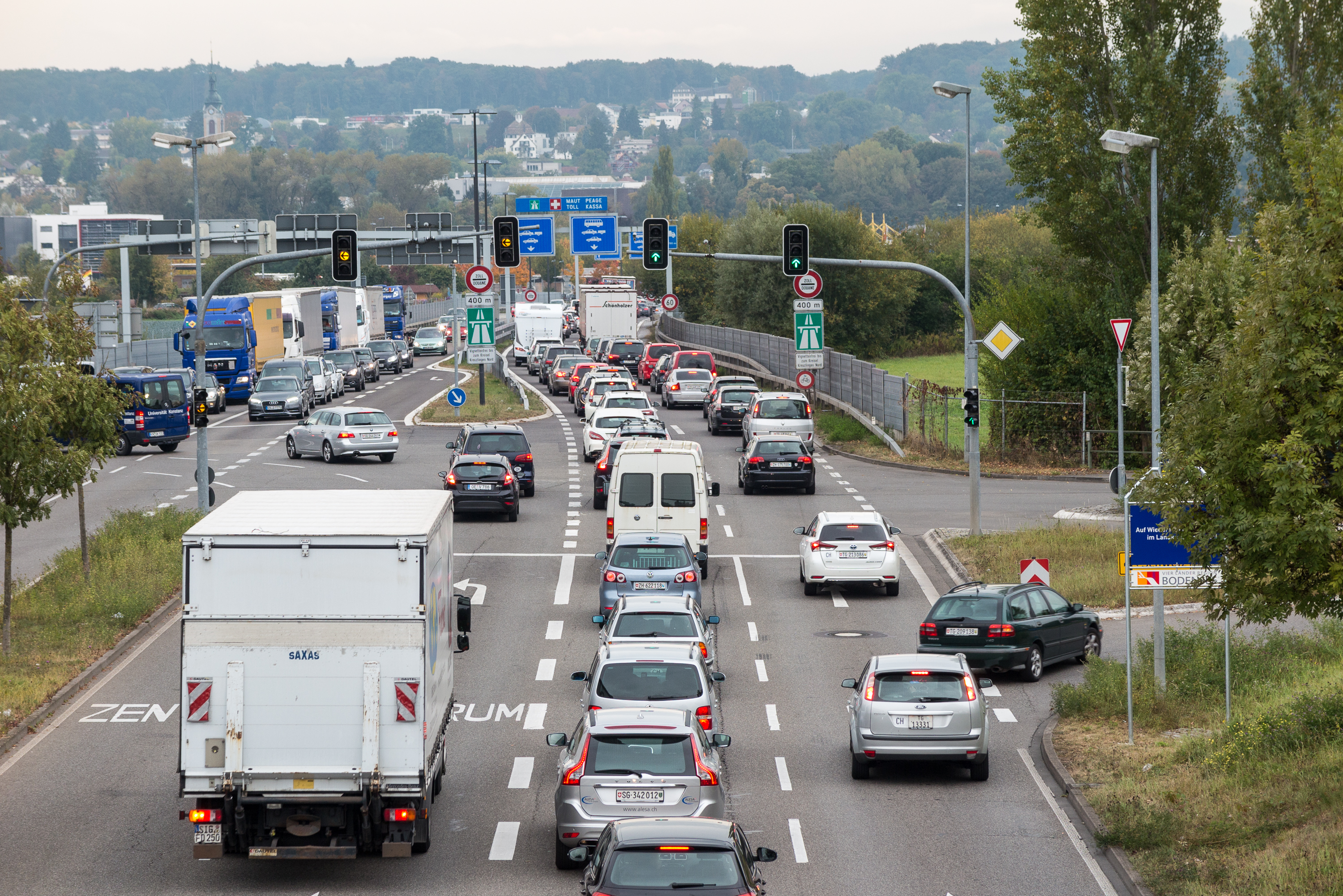
Swiss shoppers returning to their home country from Konstanz on weekends

In the late 2010s, Kreuzlingen's downtown began to experience a dearth of shoppers as many of them, including buses from elsewhere in Switzerland that pass through the city, started crossing the border to shop in Konstanz instead, due to lower prices for basic items in Germany, a favorable exchange rate between the euro and the franc and a German VAT refund that allows shoppers from non-European Union countries such as Switzerland to get back as much as a fifth of the price of the goods they buy. Elected officials from the city have asked the national government to negotiate a change in this policy with their German counterparts as they feel it is anti-competitive; at the same time some Konstanz residents, feeling displaced in their own hometown by the onslaught of Swiss on weekends, have opened businesses in Kreuzlingen that primarily cater to other Germans.

Kreuzlingen is the seat of General Dynamics European Land Systems- Mowag (GDELS), a defense technology company, formerly called MOWAG in the Unterseestrasse 65. In 2012, it had employed 900 highly skilled personnel at the facility and announced to cut 270 jobs.

== Religion ==
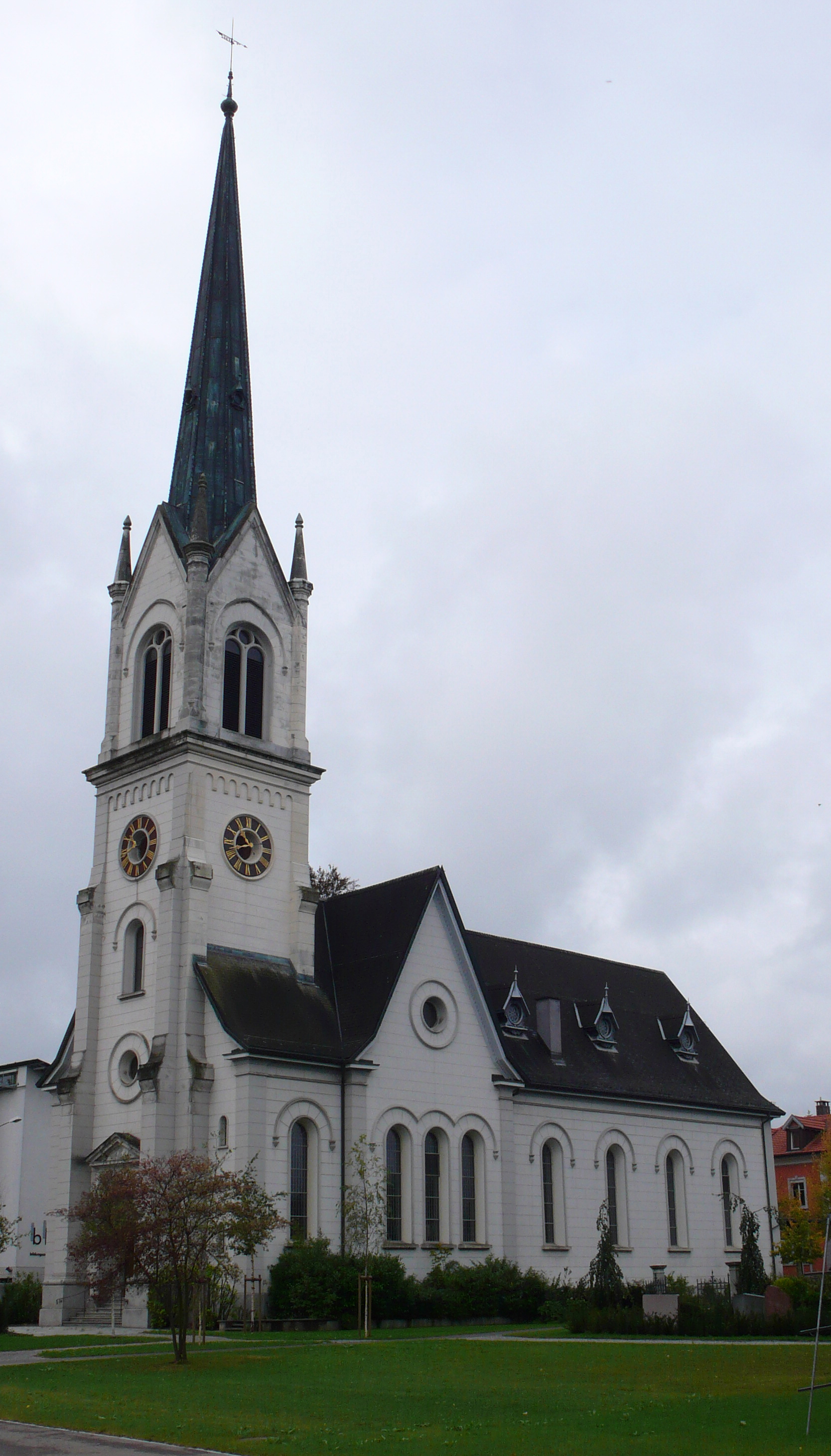
Egelshofen, Swiss Reformed Church

From the 2000 census, 12,755 or 74.45% of the population were Christian. Of those 6,339 or 37.0% were Roman Catholic, while 5,313 or 31.0% belonged to the Swiss Reformed Church. Of the rest of the population, there were 13 Old Catholics (or about 0.08% of the population) who belonged to the Christian Catholic Church of Switzerland there are 632 individuals (or about 3.69% of the population) who belong to the Orthodox Church, and there are 458 individuals (or about 2.68% of the population) who belong to another Christian church. There were 11 individuals (or about 0.06% of the population) who were Jewish, and 2,064 (or about 12.06% of the population) who are Islamic. There are 111 individuals (or about 0.65% of the population) who belong to another church (not listed on the census), 1,532 (or about 8.95% of the population) belong to no church, are agnostic or atheist, and 645 individuals (or about 3.77% of the population) did not answer the question.

== Education ==
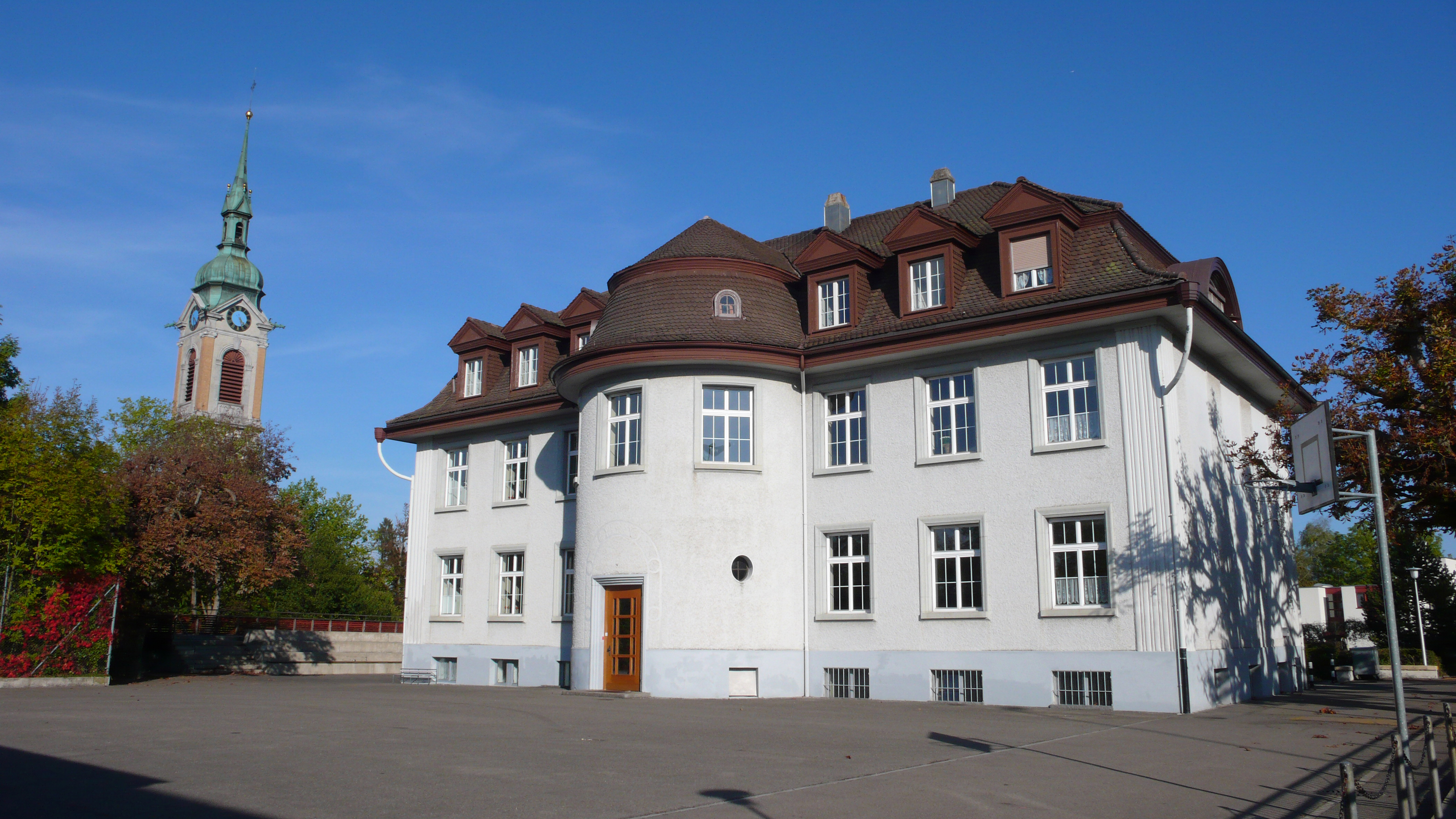
Primary School in Emmishofen

In Kreuzlingen about 63.2% of the population (between age 25–64) have completed either non-mandatory upper secondary education or additional higher education (either university or a Fachhochschule).

Kreuzlingen is home to the Kreuzlingen primary school district. It is also home to the Kreuzlingen secondary school district.

In the 2008/2009 school year there were 1,191 students in the primary school district. There were 290 children in the kindergarten, and the average class size was 17.06 kindergartners. Of the children in kindergarten, 146 or 50.3% were female, 163 or 56.2% were not Swiss citizens and 140 or 48.3% did not speak German natively. The lower and upper primary levels begin at about age 5-6 and last for 6 years. There were 446 children in who were at the lower primary level and 455 children in the upper primary level. The average class size in the primary school was 17.15 students. At the lower primary level, there were 225 children or 50.4% of the total population who were female, 245 or 54.9% were not Swiss citizens and 218 or 48.9% did not speak German natively. In the upper primary level, there were 224 or 49.2% who were female, 221 or 48.6% were not Swiss citizens and 217 or 47.7% did not speak German natively.

In the secondary school district there are 622 students. At the secondary level, students are divided according to performance. The secondary level begins at about age 12 and usually lasts 3 years. There were 318 teenagers who were in the advanced school, of which 179 or 56.3% were female, 93 or 29.2% were not Swiss citizens and 92 or 28.9% did not speak German natively. There were 274 teenagers who were in the standard school, of which 124 or 45.3% were female, 173 or 63.1% were not Swiss citizens and 174 or 63.5% did not speak German natively. Finally, there were 30 teenagers who were in special or remedial classes, of which 13 or 43.3% were female, 20 or 66.7% were not Swiss citizens and 20 or 66.7% did not speak German natively. The average class size for all classes at the secondary level was 19.73 students.

The main library in Kreuzlingen is the Stadt- und Berufsschulbibliothek. The library has (as of 2008) 22,870 books or other media, and loaned out 120,211 items in the same year. It was open a total of 290 days with average of 30 hours per week during that year.

== Transportation ==
Kreuzlingen is the northern terminus of the A7 motorway in Switzerland.

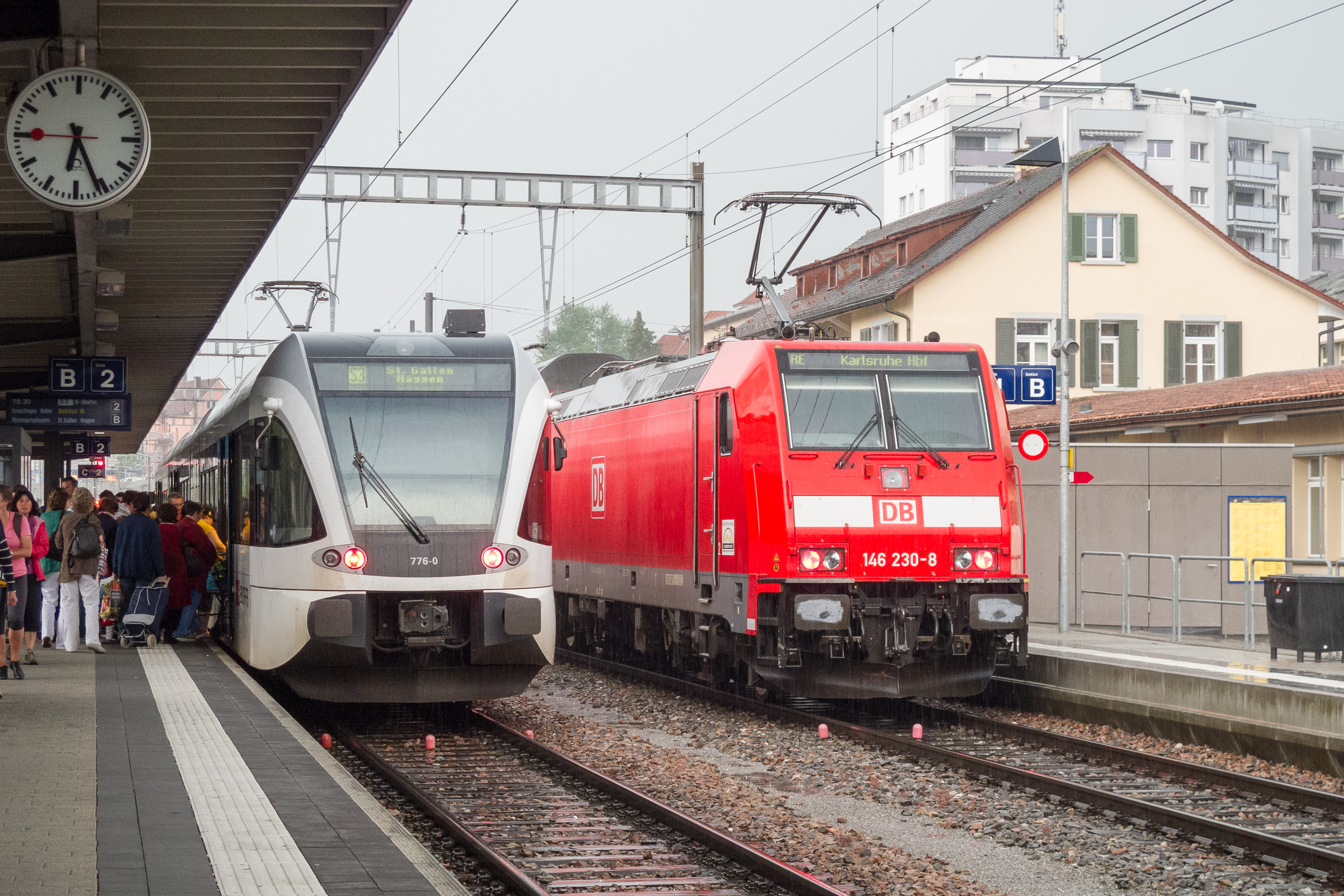
Kreuzlingen Station

There are four railway stations. Kreuzlingen, Kreuzlingen Hafen (harbour) and Kurzrickenbach Seepark are all located on the Lake Line. Kreuzlingen Bernrain is located on the Wil–Kreuzlingen railway. These stations are served by regional trains of St. Gallen S-Bahn. Kreuzlingen station is additionally served by an InterRegio service (IR75).

Between spring and autumn, the URh offers regular boat services on the High Rhine and Untersee between Kreuzlingen and Schaffhausen, via Konstanz.

== Sport ==
FC Kreuzlingen is the municipality's football club. As of 2025, they play in Promotion League, the third tier of football in Switzerland.

Kreuzlingen has traditionally been one of Switzerland's hubs in Water polo. The SC Kreuzlingen won the Swiss Championship a total of 9 times.

== Notable people ==
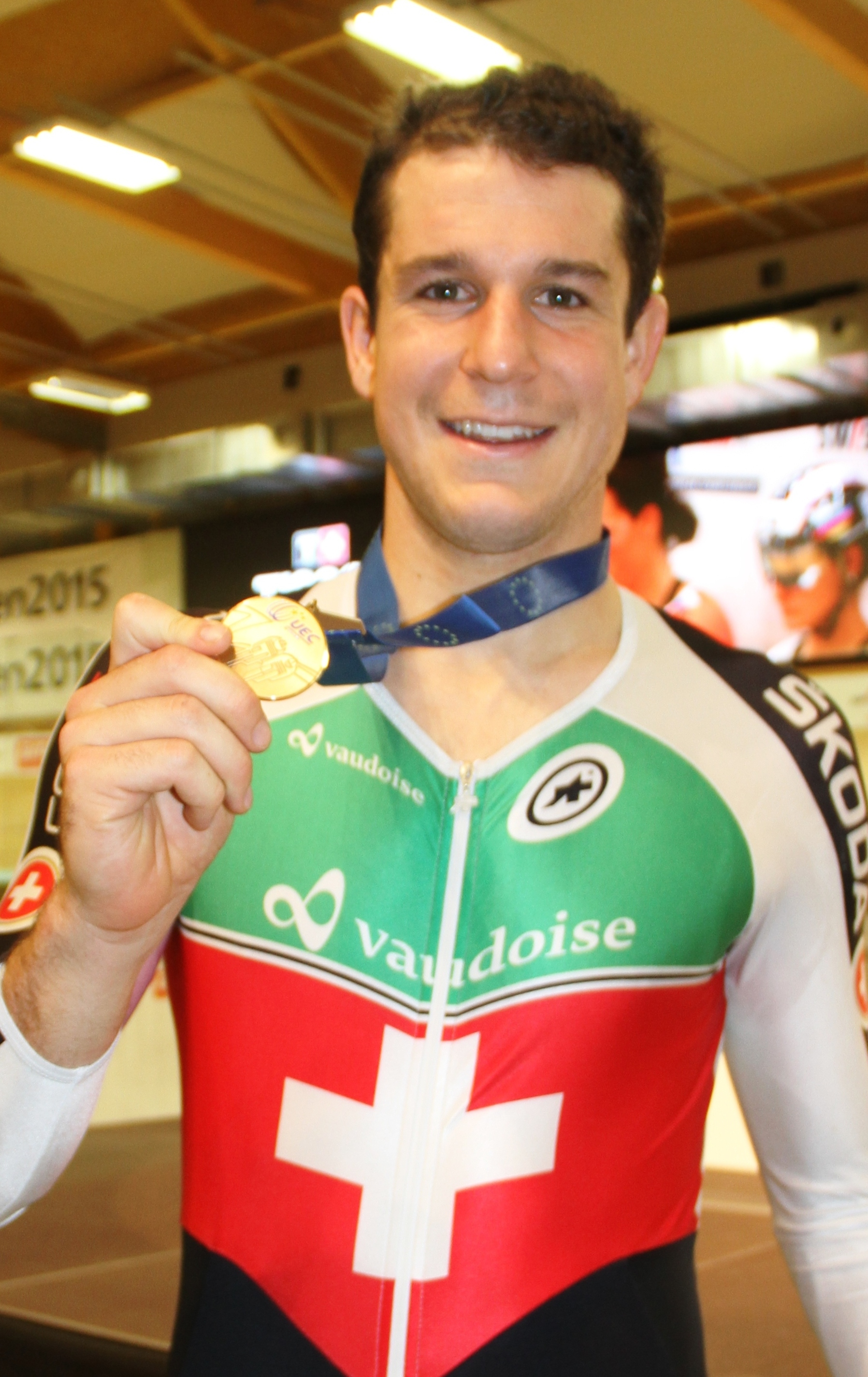
Claudio Imhof, 2015

- August Gremli (1833–1899) physician and botanist
- Enrique C. Rébsamen (1857-1904) Educator who set the foundations for elementary teachers college in Mexico
- Ludwig Binswanger (1881–1966) psychiatrist and pioneer in the field of existential psychology.
- Emil Staiger (1908–1987). a Swiss historian and writer.
- Libero de Luca (1913–1998) tenor of Italian descent particularly associated with the French repertory
- Armin Schibler (1920–1986) composer, professor of music at the Zurich Literary School from 1944
- Cesar Lüthi (1930–2002) sports marketing businessman, formed his own company locally in 1972
- Hans Binswanger-Mkhize (1943-2017), an economist focusing on agricultural economics
- Timon Altwegg (born 1967) classical pianist, known for playing chamber music, lives locally since 1992

=== Sport ===
- Erich Peters (1920–2012) Swedish gymnast who competed at the 1952 Summer Olympics
- Daniel Lopar (born 1985), retired football goalkeeper, played about 350 games
- Philipp Frommenwiler (born 1989), racing driver
- Claudio Imhof (born 1990) track cyclist

== Climate ==
Climate data for Kreuzlingen (Güttingen), elevation 440 m (1,440 ft), (1991–2020)
Month	Jan	Feb	Mar	Apr	May	Jun	Jul	Aug	Sep	Oct	Nov	Dec	Year
Mean daily maximum °C (°F)	3.4 (38.1)	5.0 (41.0)	10.1 (50.2)	14.7 (58.5)	19.1 (66.4)	22.6 (72.7)	24.5 (76.1)	24.1 (75.4)	19.2 (66.6)	13.7 (56.7)	7.6 (45.7)	4.0 (39.2)	14.0 (57.2)
Daily mean °C (°F)	1.0 (33.8)	1.6 (34.9)	5.5 (41.9)	9.4 (48.9)	13.7 (56.7)	17.4 (63.3)	19.1 (66.4)	18.6 (65.5)	14.4 (57.9)	9.9 (49.8)	5.0 (41.0)	1.8 (35.2)	9.8 (49.6)
Mean daily minimum °C (°F)	−1.6 (29.1)	−1.5 (29.3)	1.3 (34.3)	4.2 (39.6)	8.6 (47.5)	12.2 (54.0)	13.9 (57.0)	13.8 (56.8)	10.3 (50.5)	6.6 (43.9)	2.3 (36.1)	−0.7 (30.7)	5.8 (42.4)
Average precipitation mm (inches)	54.6 (2.15)	52.7 (2.07)	59.6 (2.35)	65.1 (2.56)	100.3 (3.95)	110.0 (4.33)	107.9 (4.25)	108.0 (4.25)	79.3 (3.12)	70.9 (2.79)	67.3 (2.65)	74.8 (2.94)	950.5 (37.42)
Average snowfall cm (inches)	10.6 (4.2)	12.8 (5.0)	4.1 (1.6)	0.0 (0.0)	0.0 (0.0)	0.0 (0.0)	0.0 (0.0)	0.0 (0.0)	0.0 (0.0)	0.1 (0.0)	3.6 (1.4)	8.0 (3.1)	39.2 (15.4)
Average precipitation days (≥ 1.0 mm)	9.5	8.7	9.8	9.6	11.1	11.6	11.3	11.1	9.6	9.7	9.4	10.7	122.1
Average snowy days (≥ 1.0 cm)	3.6	3.4	1.7	0.0	0.0	0.0	0.0	0.0	0.0	0.0	1.2	2.8	12.7
Average relative humidity (%)	85	81	76	72	74	74	75	78	83	87	88	87	80
Mean monthly sunshine hours	44.4	74.8	140.8	182.0	201.4	218.1	237.5	217.4	157.3	91.8	47.6	36.5	1,649.6
Percentage possible sunshine	18	28	41	47	45	48	52	52	45	30	19	16	40
Source 1: NOAA
Source 2: MeteoSwiss (snow 1981–2010)
