= Kreuzlingen Bernrain railway station =

Train station in Switzerland

Kreuzlingen Bernrain
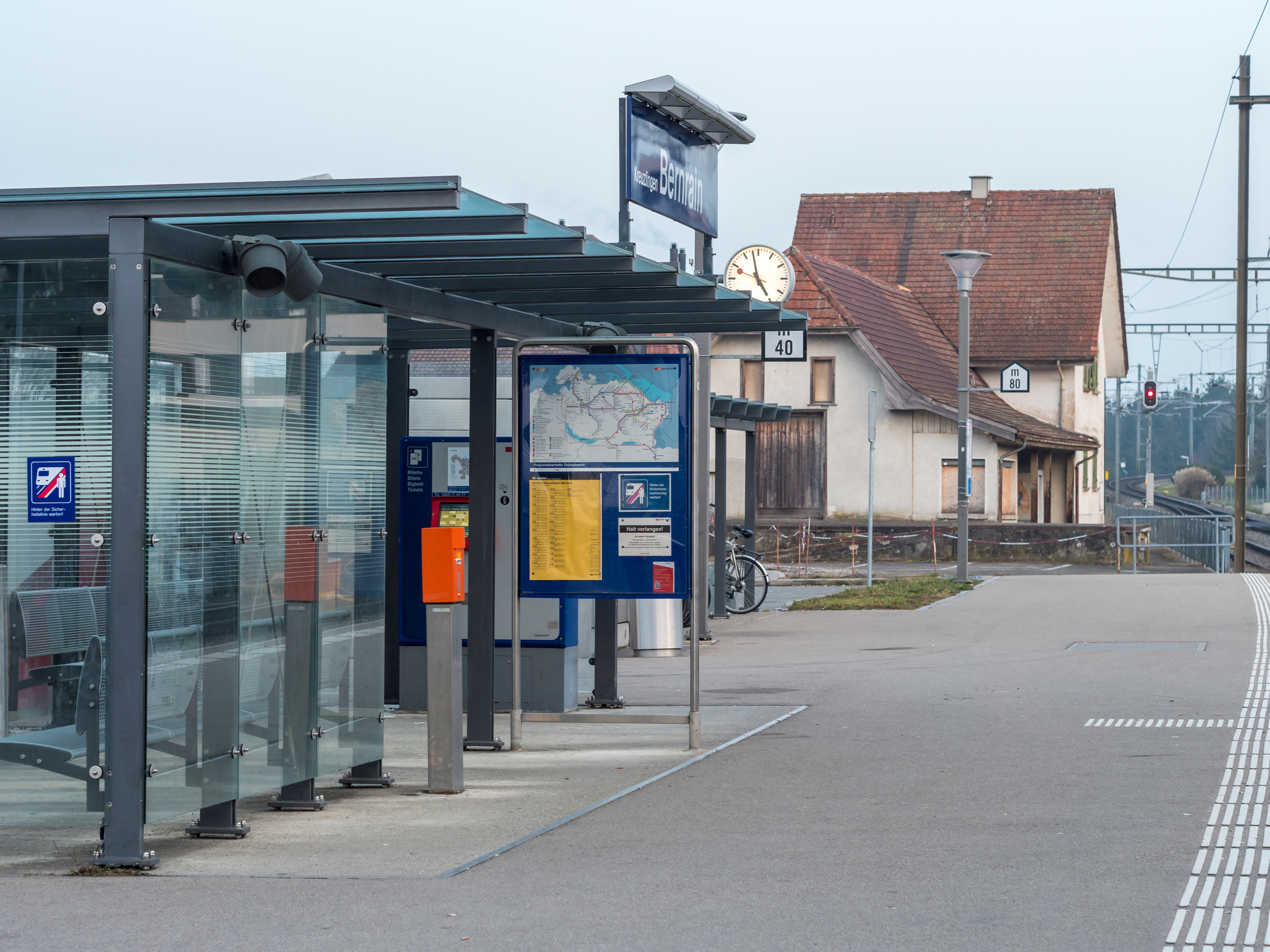
- The station platform in 2020; the former station building is in the background

General information
- Location: Kreuzlingen; Switzerland
- Coordinates: 47°38′31″N 9°09′47″E
- Elevation: 461 m (1,512 ft)
- Owner: Thurbo
- Line: Wil–Kreuzlingen
- Distance: 36.2 km (22.5 mi) from Wil
- Train operators: Thurbo
- Connections: Stadtbus Kreuzlingen buses

Other information
- Fare zone: 256 (Tarifverbund Ostschweiz)

Passengers
- 2018: 340 per weekday

Services
Preceding station	St. Gallen S-Bahn	Following station
Lengwil towards Weinfelden	S14	Tägerwilen Dorf towards Konstanz
Lengwil towards Weinfelden	SN14 Limited service	Tägerwilen Dorf towards Konstanz
Location
- Location within Switzerland Location within Canton of Thurgau

Kreuzlingen Bernrain railway station (German: Bahnhof Kreuzlingen Bernrain) is a railway station in the municipality of Kreuzlingen, in the Swiss canton of Thurgau. It is an intermediate stop on the standard gauge Wil–Kreuzlingen line of Thurbo, and is served as a request stop by local trains only.

Kreuzlingen Bernrain is one of four railway stations in the municipality of Kreuzlingen, the others being Kreuzlingen, Kreuzlingen Hafen, and Kurzrickenbach Seepark.

== Services ==
The following services stop at Kreuzlingen Bernrain:

- St. Gallen S-Bahn S14: half-hourly service between Weinfelden and Konstanz, via Kreuzlingen.

During weekends, the station is served by a nighttime S-Bahn service (SN14), offered by Ostwind tariff network, and operated by Thurbo for St. Gallen S-Bahn.

- St. Gallen S-Bahn SN14: hourly service to Weinfelden and to Konstanz, via Kreuzlingen.

== See also ==
- Bodensee S-Bahn
- Rail transport in Switzerland
