= Tägerwilen =

- Municipality
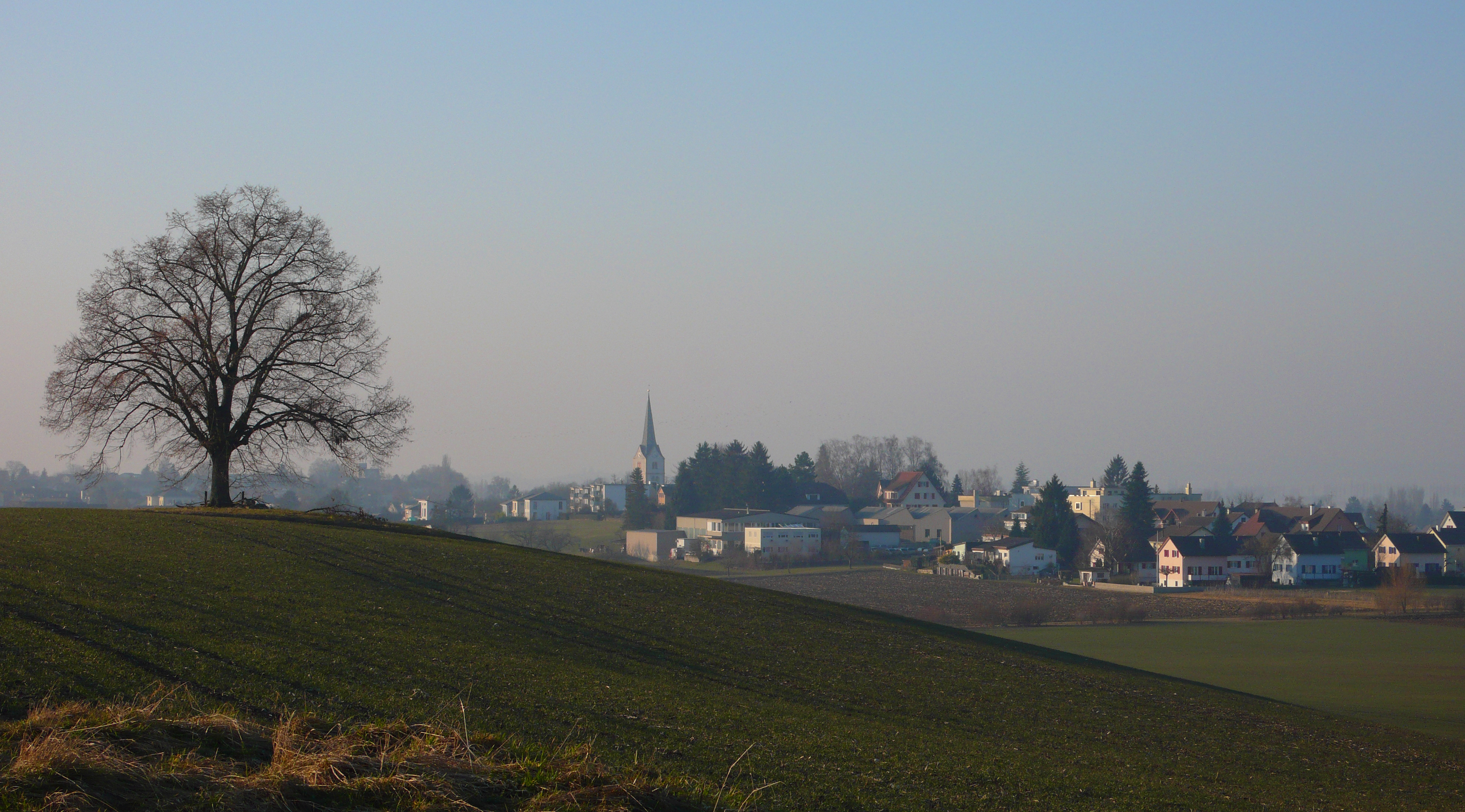

- Coat of arms
- Location of Tägerwilen
- Location within Switzerland Location within Canton of Thurgau
- Coordinates: 47°39′N 9°8′E
- Country: Switzerland
- Canton: Thurgau
- District: Kreuzlingen

Area
  - Total: 11.52 km^{2} (4.45 sq mi)
- Elevation: 420 m (1,380 ft)

Population (December 2007)
  - Total: 3,640
  - Density: 316/km^{2} (818/sq mi)
- Time zone: UTC+01:00 (CET)
  - Summer (DST): UTC+02:00 (CEST)
- Postal code: 8274
- SFOS number: 4696
- ISO 3166 code: CH-TG
- Surrounded by: Constance (Konstanz) (DE-BW), Ermatingen, Gottlieben, Kemmental, Kreuzlingen, Reichenau (DE-BW), Wäldi
- Website: www.taegerwilen.ch

Tägerwilen is a municipality in the district of Kreuzlingen in the canton of Thurgau in Switzerland.

== Geography ==
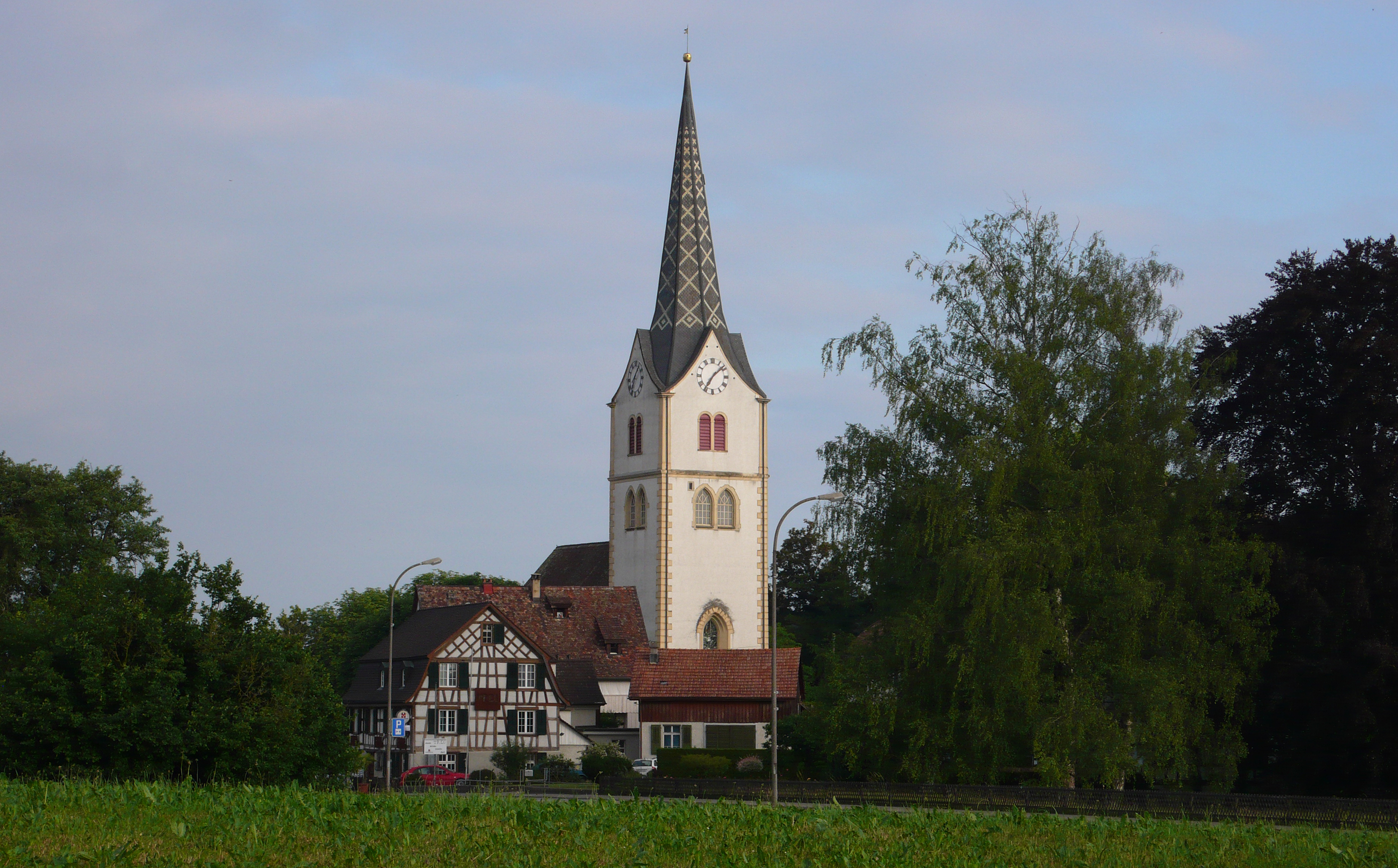
Tagerwilen church

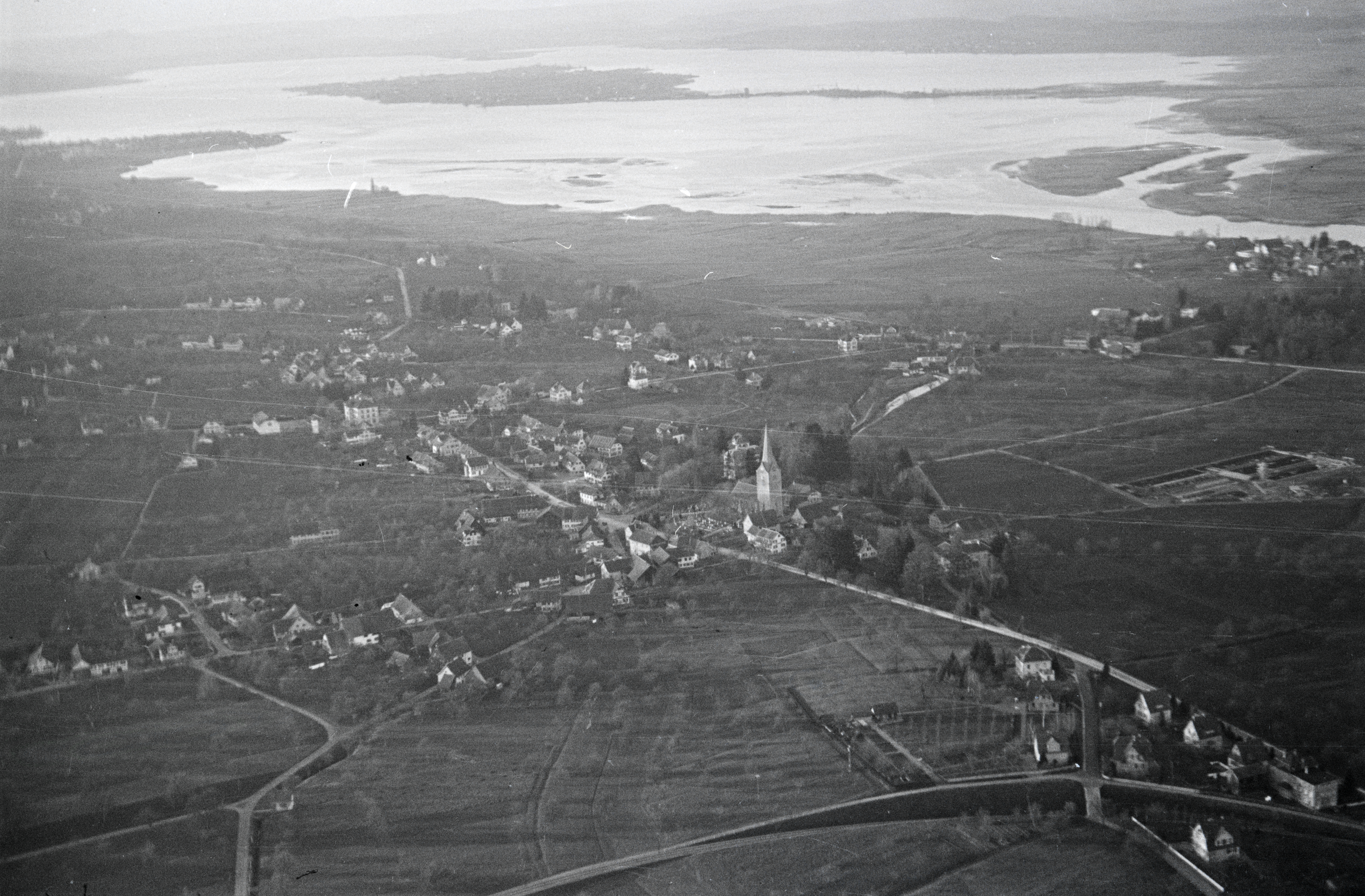
Aerial view by Walter Mittelholzer (1931)

Tägerwilen has an area, as of 2009, of 11.52 square kilometers (4.45 sq mi). Of this area, 5.47 km^{2} (2.11 sq mi) or 47.5% is used for agricultural purposes, while 4.31 km^{2} (1.66 sq mi) or 37.4% is forested. Of the rest of the land, 1.66 km^{2} (0.64 sq mi) or 14.4% is settled (buildings or roads), 0.04 km^{2} (9.9 acres) or 0.3% is either rivers or lakes and 0.06 km^{2} (15 acres) or 0.5% is unproductive land.

Of the built up area, industrial buildings made up 6.4% of the total area while housing and buildings made up 1.0% and transportation infrastructure made up 0.5%. Power and water infrastructure as well as other special developed areas made up 1.8% of the area while parks, green belts and sports fields made up 4.6%. Out of the forested land, 35.9% of the total land area is heavily forested and 1.6% is covered with orchards or small clusters of trees. Of the agricultural land, 44.0% is used for growing crops, while 3.5% is used for orchards or vine crops. All the water in the municipality is flowing water.

== Demographics ==
Tägerwilen has a population (as of December 2020) of 4,921. As of 2008, 30.2% of the population were foreign nationals. Over the last 10 years (1997–2007) the population has changed at a rate of 11.5%. Most of the population (as of 2000) speaks German (90.7%), with Albanian being the second most common language( 3.1%) and Italian being the third ( 1.6%).

As of 2008, the gender distribution of the population was 49.0% male and 51.0% female. The population was made up of 1,219 Swiss men (32.6% of the population), and 611 (16.4%) non-Swiss men. There were 1,387 Swiss women (37.1%), and 519 (13.9%) non-Swiss women.

In 2008 there were 21 live births to Swiss citizens and 17 births to non-Swiss citizens, and in same time span there were 26 deaths of Swiss citizens and 2 non-Swiss citizen deaths. Ignoring immigration and emigration, the population of Swiss citizens decreased by 5 while the foreign population increased by 15. There was 1 Swiss man, 1 Swiss woman who emigrated from Switzerland to another country, 42 non-Swiss men who emigrated from Switzerland to another country and 41 non-Swiss women who emigrated from Switzerland to another country. The total Swiss population change in 2008 (from all sources) was an increase of 10 and the non-Swiss population change was an increase of 68 people. This represents a population growth rate of 2.1%.

The age distribution, as of 2009, in Tägerwilen is; 378 children or 10.0% of the population are between 0 and 9 years old and 508 teenagers or 13.5% are between 10 and 19. Of the adult population, 430 people or 11.4% of the population are between 20 and 29 years old. 467 people or 12.4% are between 30 and 39, 741 people or 19.7% are between 40 and 49, and 499 people or 13.3% are between 50 and 59. The senior population distribution is 338 people or 9.0% of the population are between 60 and 69 years old, 262 people or 7.0% are between 70 and 79, there are 110 people or 2.9% who are between 80 and 89, and there are 30 people or 0.8% who are 90 and older.

As of 2000, there were 1,301 private households in the municipality, and an average of 2.4 persons per household. In 2000 there were 466 single family homes (or 76.5% of the total) out of a total of 609 inhabited buildings. There were 49 two family buildings (8.0%), 27 three family buildings (4.4%) and 67 multi-family buildings (or 11.0%). There were 757 (or 23.1%) persons who were part of a couple without children, and 1,750 (or 53.5%) who were part of a couple with children. There were 220 (or 6.7%) people who lived in single parent home, while there are 14 persons who were adult children living with one or both parents, 11 persons who lived in a household made up of relatives, 30 who lived in a household made up of unrelated persons, and 92 who are either institutionalized or live in another type of collective housing.

The vacancy rate for the municipality, in 2008, was 0.12%. As of 2007, the construction rate of new housing units was 8.2 new units per 1000 residents. In 2000 there were 1,418 apartments in the municipality. The most common apartment size was the 4 room apartment of which there were 397. There were 30 single room apartments and 253 apartments with six or more rooms. As of 2000 the average price to rent an average apartment in Tägerwilen was 1063.37 Swiss francs (CHF) per month (US$850, £480, €680 approx. exchange rate from 2000). The average rate for a one-room apartment was 490.18 CHF (US$390, £220, €310), a two-room apartment was about 760.04 CHF (US$610, £340, €490), a three-room apartment was about 868.16 CHF (US$690, £390, €560) and a six or more room apartment cost an average of 1868.87 CHF (US$1500, £840, €1200). The average apartment price in Tägerwilen was 95.3% of the national average of 1116 CHF.

In the 2007 federal election the most popular party was the SVP which received 38.57% of the vote. The next three most popular parties were the FDP (15.73%), the CVP (15.18%) and the Green Party (11.79%). In the federal election, a total of 948 votes were cast, and the voter turnout was 45.4%.

The historical population is given in the following table:

year	population
1950	1,516
1960	1,650
1980	2,224
1990	2,618
2000	3,273

== Heritage sites of national significance ==
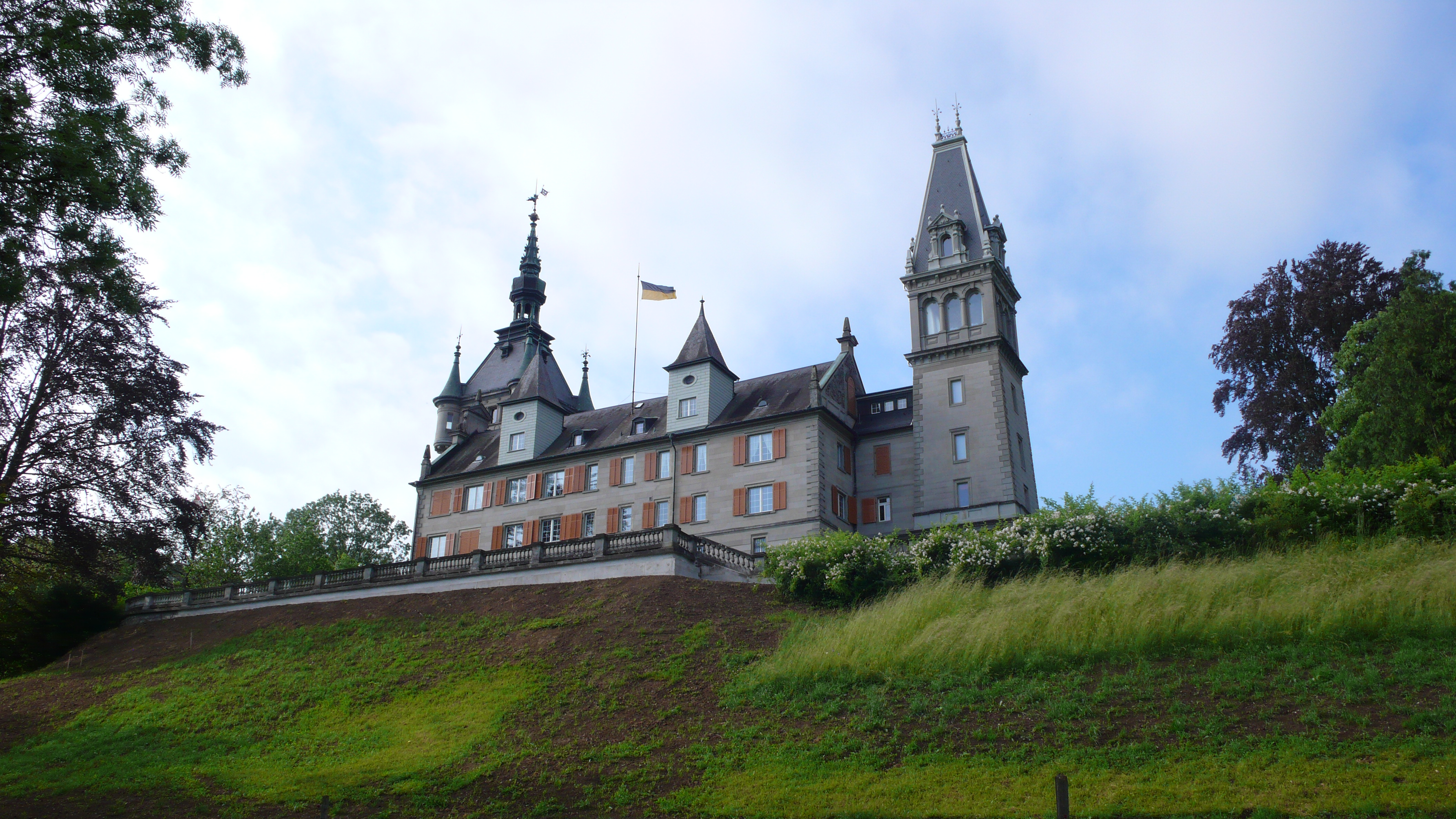
Castell Castle

Castell Castle is listed as a Swiss heritage site of national significance. The entire Untersee region, which includes Tägerwilen, is part of the Inventory of Swiss Heritage Sites.

== Economy ==
As of 2007, Tägerwilen had an unemployment rate of 1.77%. As of 2005, there were 181 people employed in the primary economic sector and about 35 businesses involved in this sector. 475 people are employed in the secondary sector and there are 55 businesses in this sector. 1,230 people are employed in the tertiary sector, with 183 businesses in this sector.

In 2000 there were 2,247 workers who lived in the municipality. Of these, 997 or about 44.4% of the residents worked outside Tägerwilen while 1,260 people commuted into the municipality for work. There were a total of 2,510 jobs (of at least 6 hours per week) in the municipality. Of the working population, 6.1% used public transportation to get to work, and 51.2% used a private car.

== Religion ==
From the 2000 census, 935 or 28.6% were Roman Catholic, while 1,626 or 49.7% belonged to the Swiss Reformed Church. Of the rest of the population, there are 59 individuals (or about 1.80% of the population) who belong to the Orthodox Church, and there are 90 individuals (or about 2.75% of the population) who belong to another Christian church. There were 5 individuals (or about 0.15% of the population) who were Jewish, and 191 (or about 5.84% of the population) who are Islamic. There are 7 individuals (or about 0.21% of the population) who belong to another church (not listed on the census), 238 (or about 7.27% of the population) belong to no church, are agnostic or atheist, and 122 individuals (or about 3.73% of the population) did not answer the question.

== Transport ==
Tägerwilen is served by the St. Gallen S-Bahn at two stations: Tägerwilen-Gottlieben on the Lake Line and Tägerwilen Dorf on the Wil–Kreuzlingen line.

== Education ==
In Tägerwilen about 73.9% of the population (between age 25–64) have completed either non-mandatory upper secondary education or additional higher education (either university or a Fachhochschule).

Tägerwilen is home to the Tägerwilen primary and secondary school district. In the 2008/2009 school year there were 358 students. There were 78 children in the kindergarten, and the average class size was 15.6 kindergartners. Of the children in kindergarten, 36 or 46.2% were female, 21 or 26.9% were not Swiss citizens and 7 or 9.0% did not speak German natively. The lower and upper primary levels begin at about age 5-6 and last for 6 years. There were 134 children in who were at the lower primary level and 146 children in the upper primary level. The average class size in the primary school was 19.07 students. At the lower primary level, there were 63 children or 47.0% of the total population who were female, 26 or 19.4% were not Swiss citizens and 14 or 10.4% did not speak German natively. In the upper primary level, there were 75 or 51.4% who were female, 24 or 16.4% were not Swiss citizens and 16 or 11.0% did not speak German natively.

At the secondary level, students are divided according to performance. The secondary level begins at about age 12 and usually lasts 3 years. Finally, there were 153 teenagers who were in special or remedial classes, of which 72 or 47.1% were female, 21 or 13.7% were not Swiss citizens and 13 or 8.5% did not speak German natively.

== Notable people ==
- Hermann Müller (Thurgau) (1850–1927) botanist, plant physiologist, oenologist, born in Tägerwilen.

== See also ==
- Tägermoos
