= Kreuzlingen railway station =

Railway station in Switzerland

Kreuzlingen
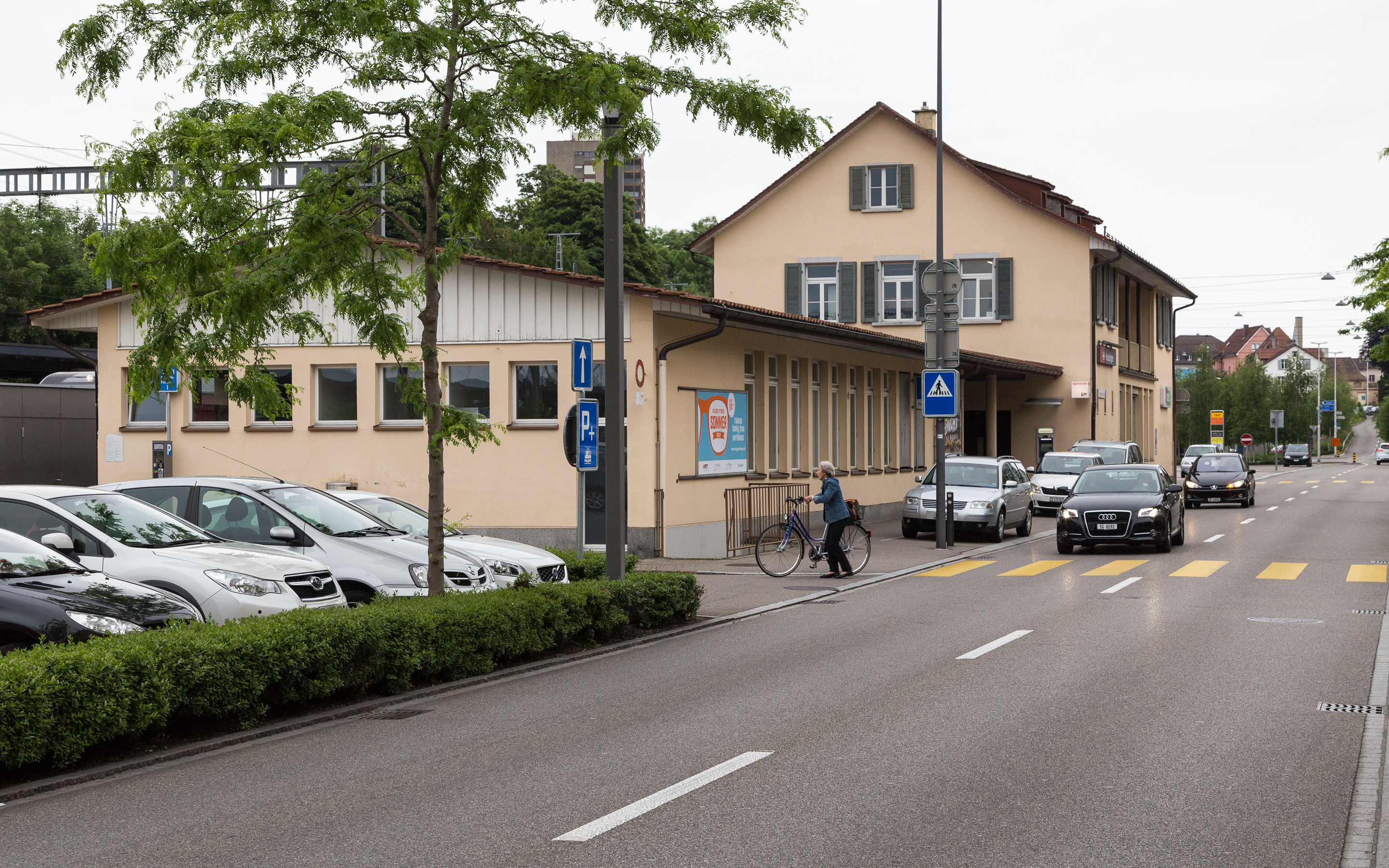
- The station building in 2016

General information
- Location: Kreuzlingen; Switzerland
- Coordinates: 47°39′09″N 9°10′08″E
- Elevation: 403 m (1,322 ft)
- Owner: Swiss Federal Railways
- Lines: Lake line; Wil–Kreuzlingen line
- Distance: 41.1 km (25.5 mi) from Wil
- Platforms: 1 side platform, 1 island platform
- Tracks: 4
- Train operators: Swiss Federal Railways; Thurbo
- Connections: PostAuto Schweiz and Verkehrsbetriebe Kreuzlingen buses

Other information
- Fare zone: 256 (Tarifverbund Ostschweiz)

History
- Former names: Emmishofen

Passengers
- 2018: 8100 per weekday

Services
Preceding station	SBB CFF FFS	Following station
Weinfelden towards Lucerne	IR 75	Konstanz Terminus
Preceding station	St. Gallen S-Bahn	Following station
Tägerwilen-Gottlieben towards Schaffhausen	S1	Kreuzlingen Hafen towards Wil
Tägerwilen Dorf towards Weinfelden	S14	Konstanz Terminus
Weinfelden Terminus	S44	Konstanz Terminus
Tägerwilen Dorf towards Weinfelden	SN14 Limited service	Konstanz Terminus
Terminus	SN71 Limited service	Kreuzlingen Hafen towards Romanshorn
Location
- Location within Switzerland Location within Canton of Thurgau

Kreuzlingen railway station (German: Bahnhof Kreuzlingen) is a railway station in Kreuzlingen, in the Swiss canton of Thurgau. It sits at the junction of the standard gauge Lake line of Swiss Federal Railways and the Wil–Kreuzlingen line of Thurbo. It is one of four railway stations in the municipality of Kreuzlingen, the others being Kreuzlingen Bernrain, Kreuzlingen Hafen, and Kurzrickenbach Seepark.

== Services ==
As of the December 2022 timetable change, the following services stop at Kreuzlingen:

- InterRegio:
  - : hourly service over the Wil–Kreuzlingen line between Lucerne and Konstanz. via Zürich HB.
- St. Gallen S-Bahn:
  - S1: half-hourly service over the Lake line from Schaffhausen to Wil via St. Gallen.
  - S14: half-hourly service over the Wil–Kreuzlingen line between Weinfelden and Konstanz.
  - S44: service every two hours between Weinfelden and Konstanz, with connections in Weinfelden to the IC 81.

During weekends, the station is served by two nighttime S-Bahn services (SN14, SN71), offered by Ostwind fare network, and operated by Thurbo for St. Gallen S-Bahn.

- St. Gallen S-Bahn:
  - SN14: hourly service to Weinfelden and to Konstanz.
  - SN71: hourly service to Romanshorn.

== Gallery ==
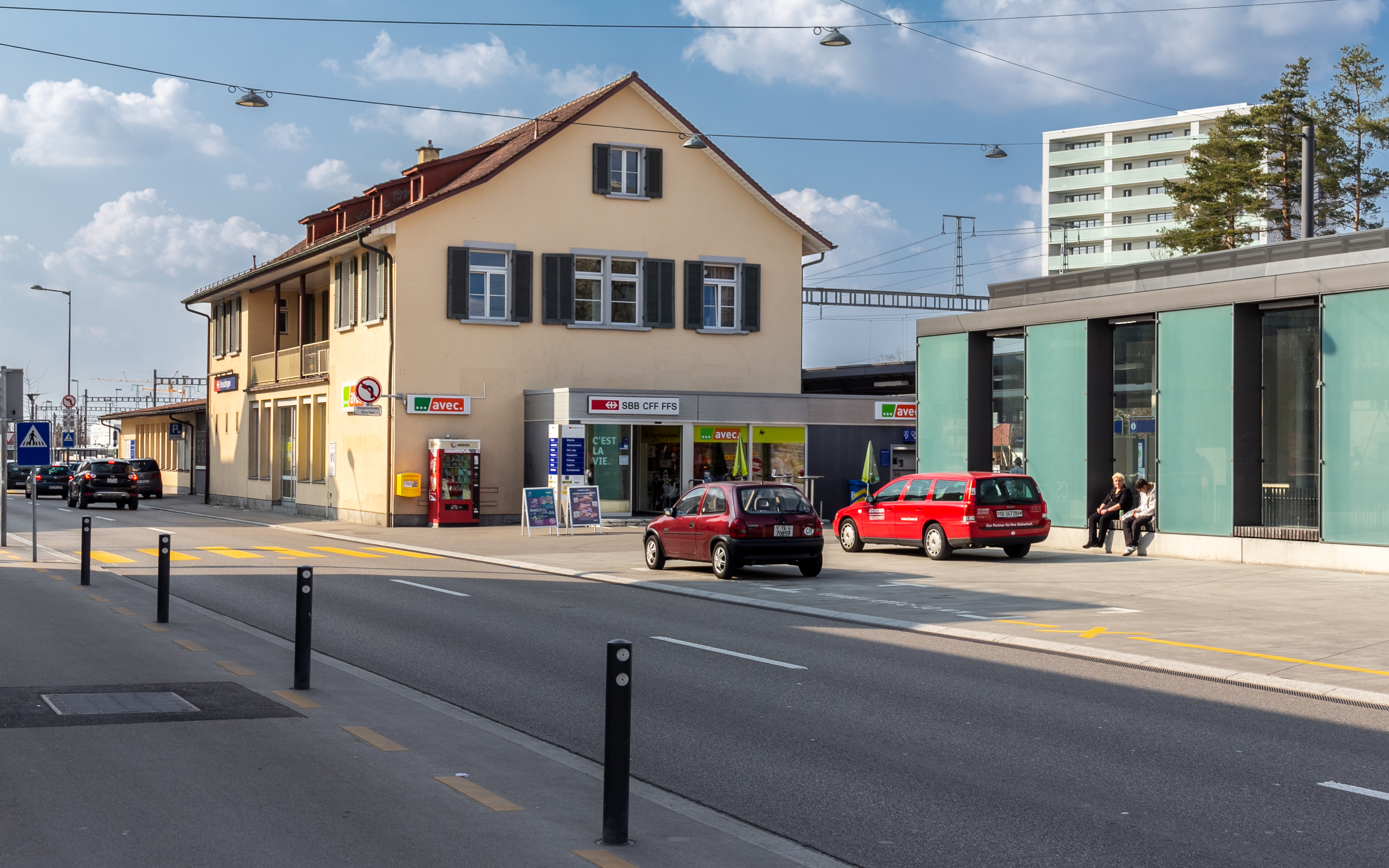
station building in 2012

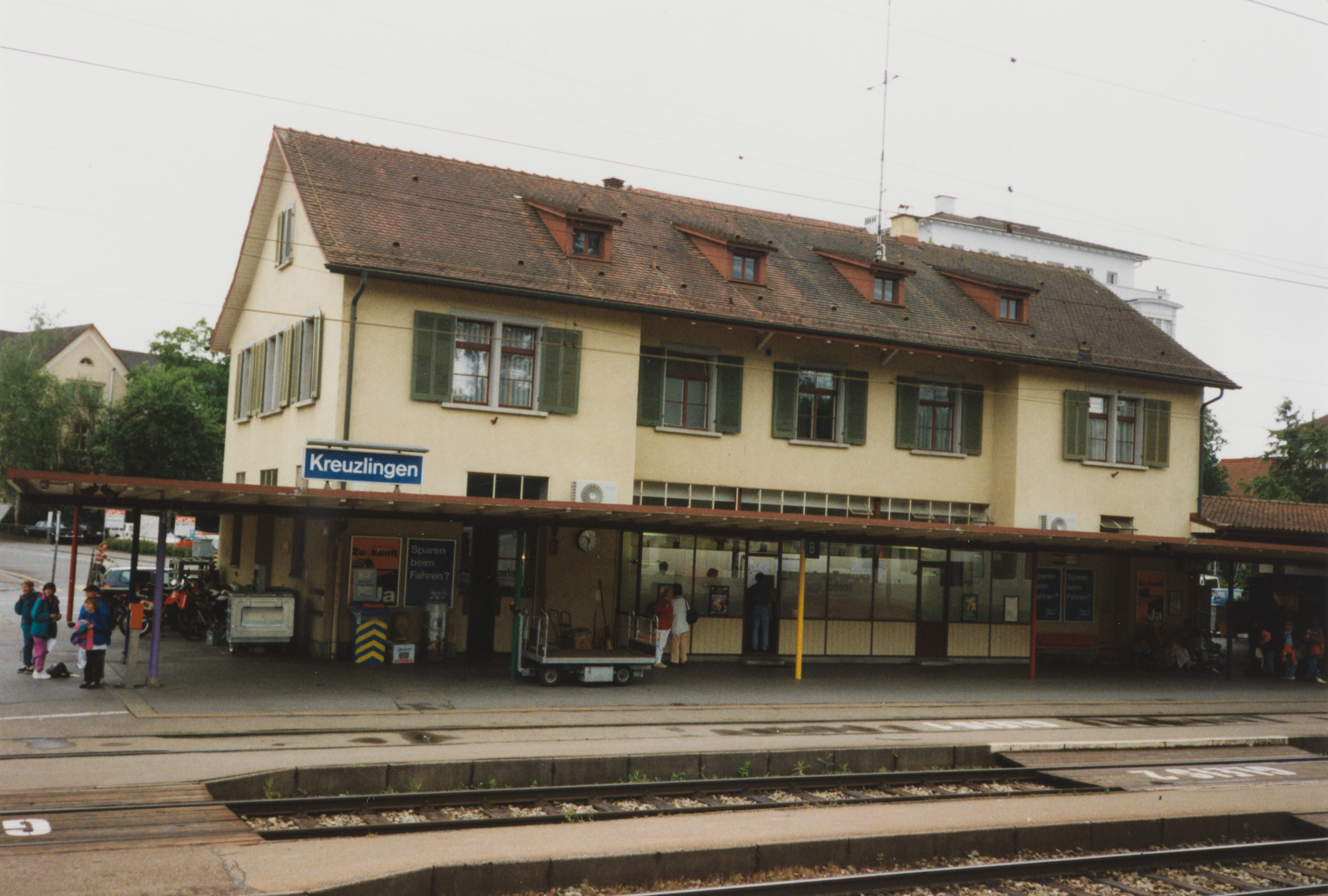
station building in 1998

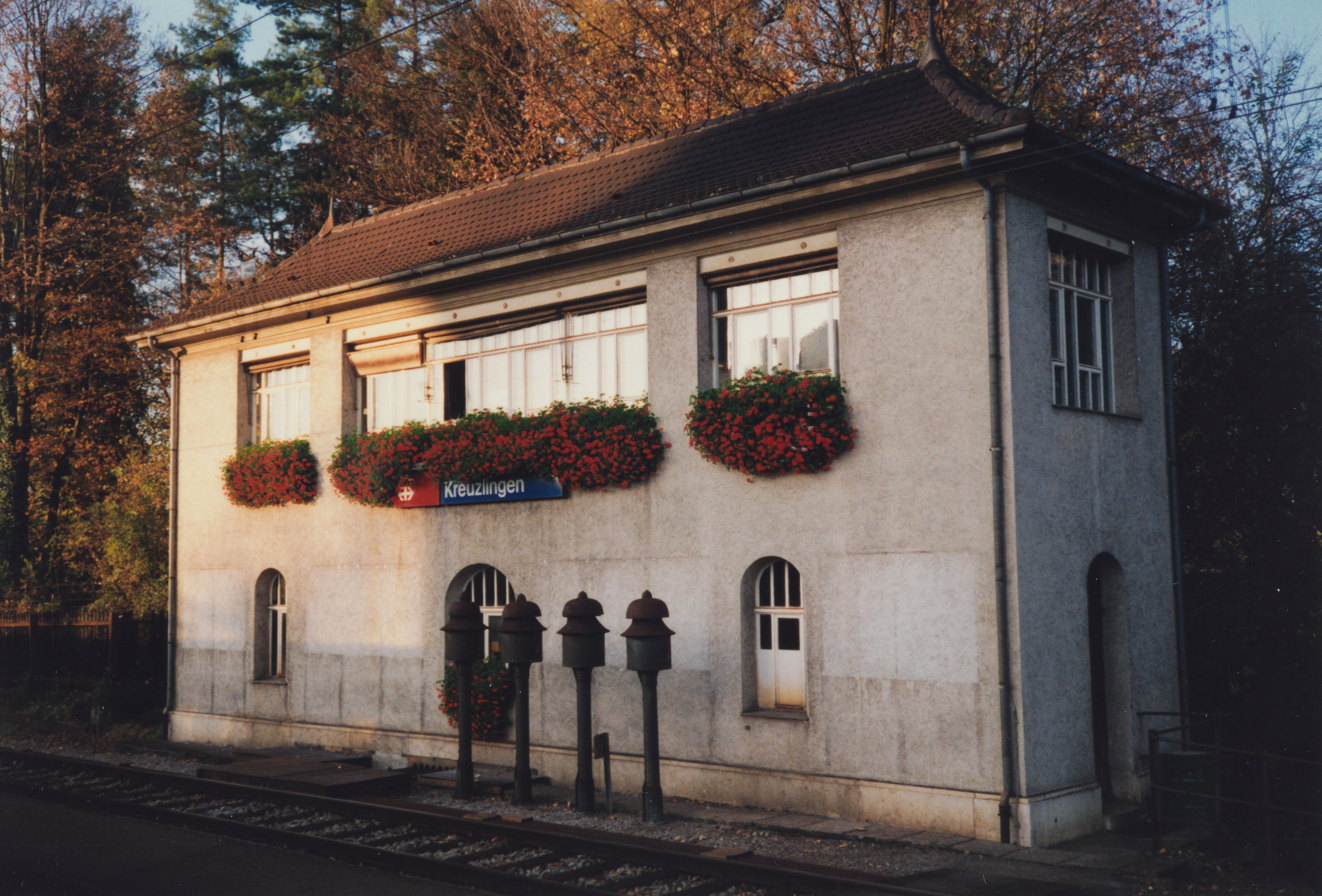
signal box in 1995

== See also ==
- Bodensee S-Bahn
- Rail transport in Switzerland
