= Schweizerische Schifffahrtsgesellschaft Untersee und Rhein =

Public Swiss company

Schweizerische Schifffahrtsgesellschaft Untersee und Rhein AG

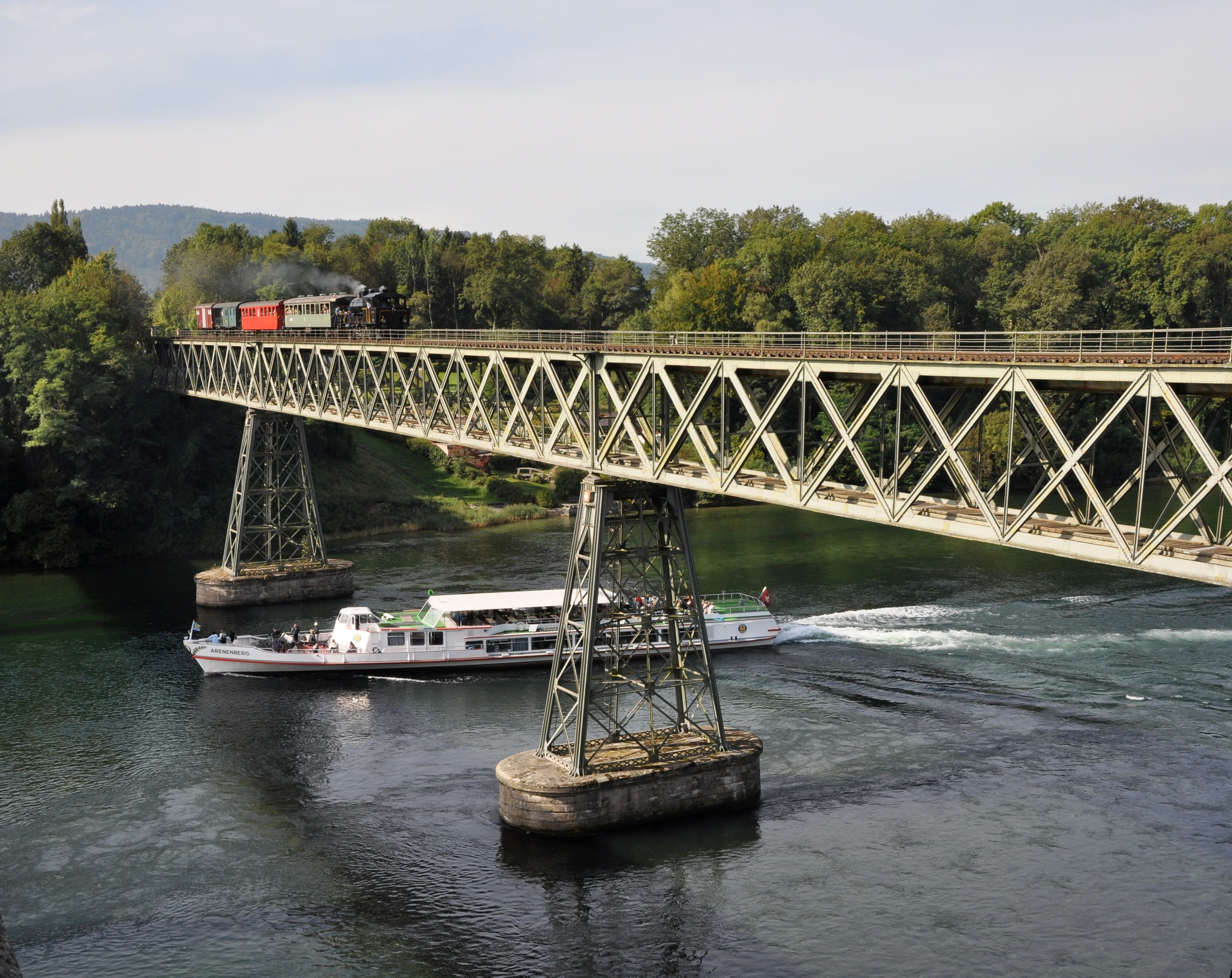
- The MS Arenenberg passing under the Hemishofen railway bridge
- Company type: AG
- Industry: Transport
- Headquarters: Schaffhausen, Switzerland
- Area served: Lower Lake Constance; High Rhine; Seerhein; Constance Hopper
- Website: http://www.urh.ch/en

The Schweizerische Schifffahrtsgesellschaft Untersee und Rhein AG (commonly abbreviated to URh), lit. 'Swiss Navigation Company of the Untersee and Rhine', is an Aktiengesellschaft (AG) based in the Swiss town of Schaffhausen. It operates regular boat lines (spring–autumn) between Schaffhausen and Kreuzlingen over the scenic High Rhine (Hochrhein) and western part of Lake Constance (Bodensee).

The company was founded in 1850 as the Schweizerische Dampfboot-Aktiengesellschaft (Swiss paddle steamer corporation). After stopping all operations in 1863, it resumed operations in 1864 under its new name Schweizerische Dampfbootgesellschaft für den Untersee und Rhein (lit. 'Swiss paddle steamer association for the Untersee and Rhine'). The company runs under its current name since 1936.

== Route ==
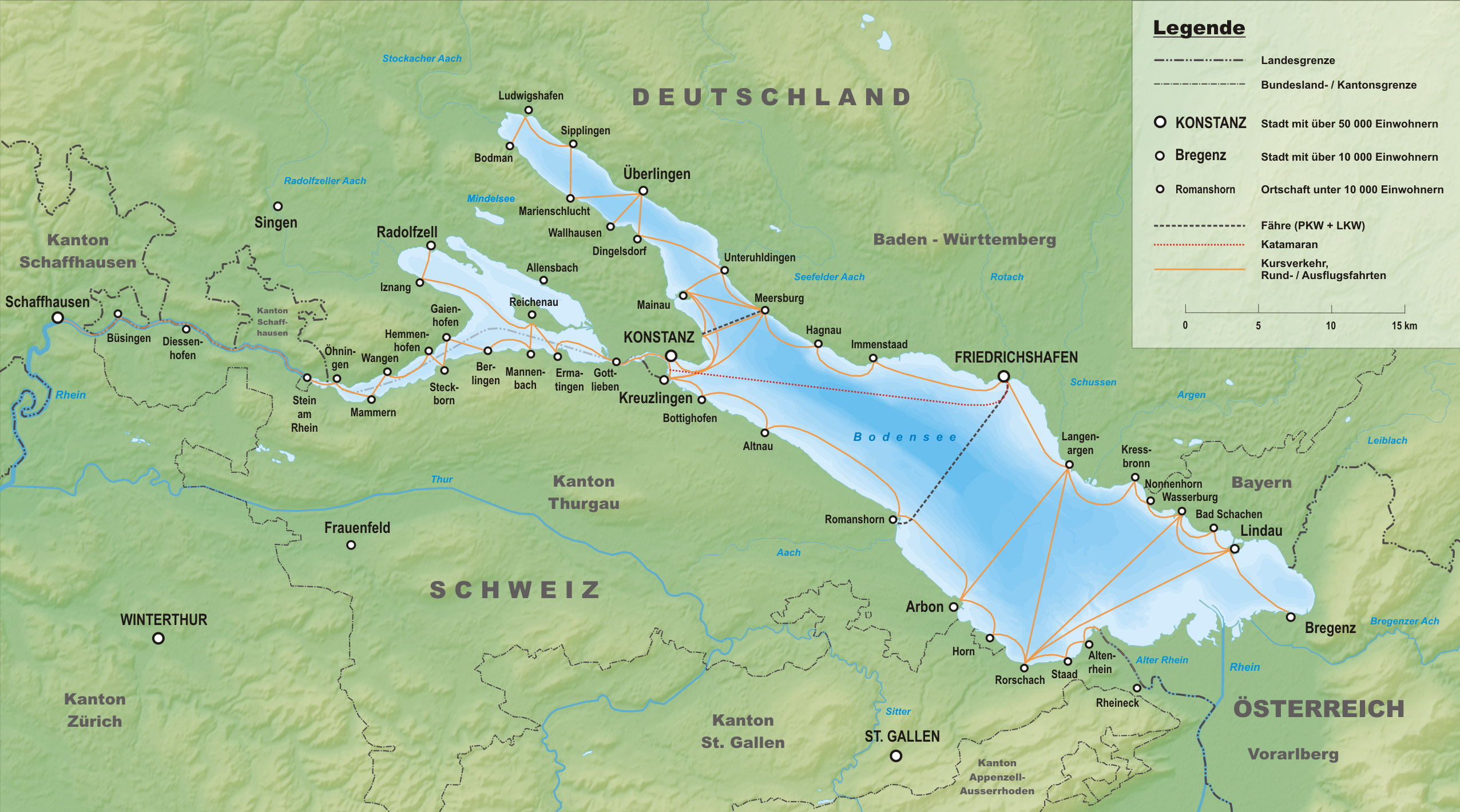
Boat routes along the upper High Rhine (Schaffhausen–Stein am Rhein) and Lake Constance

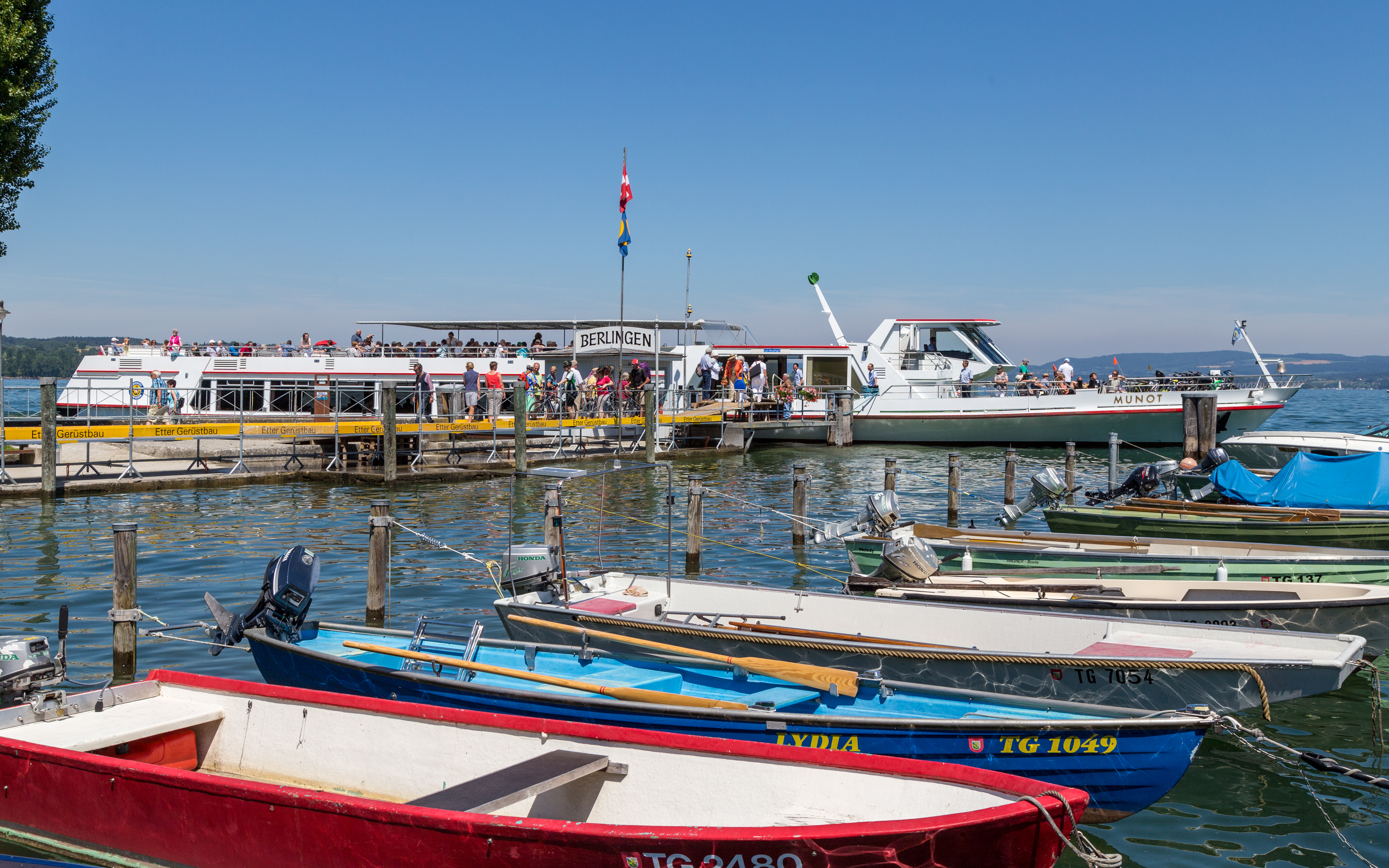
The MS Munot in Berlingen

The Schweizerische Schifffahrtsgesellschaft Untersee und Rhein (URh) operates on the upper part of the High Rhine and the western part of Lake Constance. These water bodies largely correspond to the Germany–Switzerland border. A full journey (Schaffhausen–Kreuzlingen) takes ca. 3 hours 45 min.

The URh serves landing stages in the following towns and cities in both Switzerland and Germany ( designates relatively close railway stations to the landing stage):

- Schaffhausen, Schifflände (CH), connections to municipal bus lines to Schaffhausen railway station, and a trackless train (Rhyfall Express) to the Rhine Falls (Rheinfall)
- Büsingen am Hochrhein (D)
- Diessenhofen (CH) (also serving Gailingen am Hochrhein, D)
- Stein am Rhein (CH)
- Öhningen (D)
- Mammern (CH)
- Wangen (D)
- Hemmenhofen (D)
- Steckborn (CH)
- Gaienhofen (D)
- Berlingen (CH)
- Mannenbach (CH)
- Reichenau (D)
- Ermatingen (CH)
- Gottlieben (CH)
- Konstanz (D)
- Kreuzlingen (CH)

=== Combined journey by boat and train ===
The Lake Line is a railway line that closely follows the southern shore of the High Rhine and Lake Constance, allowing for a return trip by train (e.g. Kreuzlingen Hafen–Schaffhausen takes 1 hour 2 min with the S1 service of St. Gallen S-Bahn). The following railway stations are within close walking distance (less than 600 m (2,000 ft)) to landing stages of URh: Berlingen, Ermatingen, Konstanz, Kreuzlingen Hafen, Mammern, Mannenbach-Salenstein, and Steckborn.

== Fleet ==
As of 2024, the fleet consists of six motor ships (MS). Each of them is named and carries its name near the nose of the ship. Most are named after municipalities or cantons, carrying the respective coat of arms.

Name	Commissioned in	Machine capacity	Passenger capacity	Image	Image caption
MS Schaffhausen	1970	512 kW (687 hp)	700 (includes 373 seats)	2009	The Schaffhausen, named after the canton of Schaffhausen, near Eschenz
MS Thurgau	1965	720 kW (970 hp)	600 (includes 373 seats)	2007	The Thurgau leaving the town of Schaffhausen. It is named after the canton of Thurgau
MS Arenenberg	1983	560 kW (750 hp)	580 (includes 350 seats)		The Arenenberg (named after the Arenenberg estate) near Eschenz
MS Munot	1998	660 kW (890 hp)	580 (includes 335 seats)	2007	The Munot near Stein am Rhein. It is named after the Munot fortress and carries the coat of arms of the city of Schaffhausen
MS Stein am Rhein	1956	331 kW (444 hp)	300 (includes 234 seats)	2007	The Stein am Rhein at Mannenbach landing stage. The ship is named after Stein am Rhein
MS Konstanz	1925	103 kW (138 hp)	60	2013	The Konstanz in front of the shipyard in Langwiesen. The boat is named after the city of Konstanz (Germany)

== See also ==
- List of lakes of Switzerland
- List of rivers of Switzerland
- Tourism in Switzerland
- Transport in Switzerland
