= Salenstein =

- Municipality
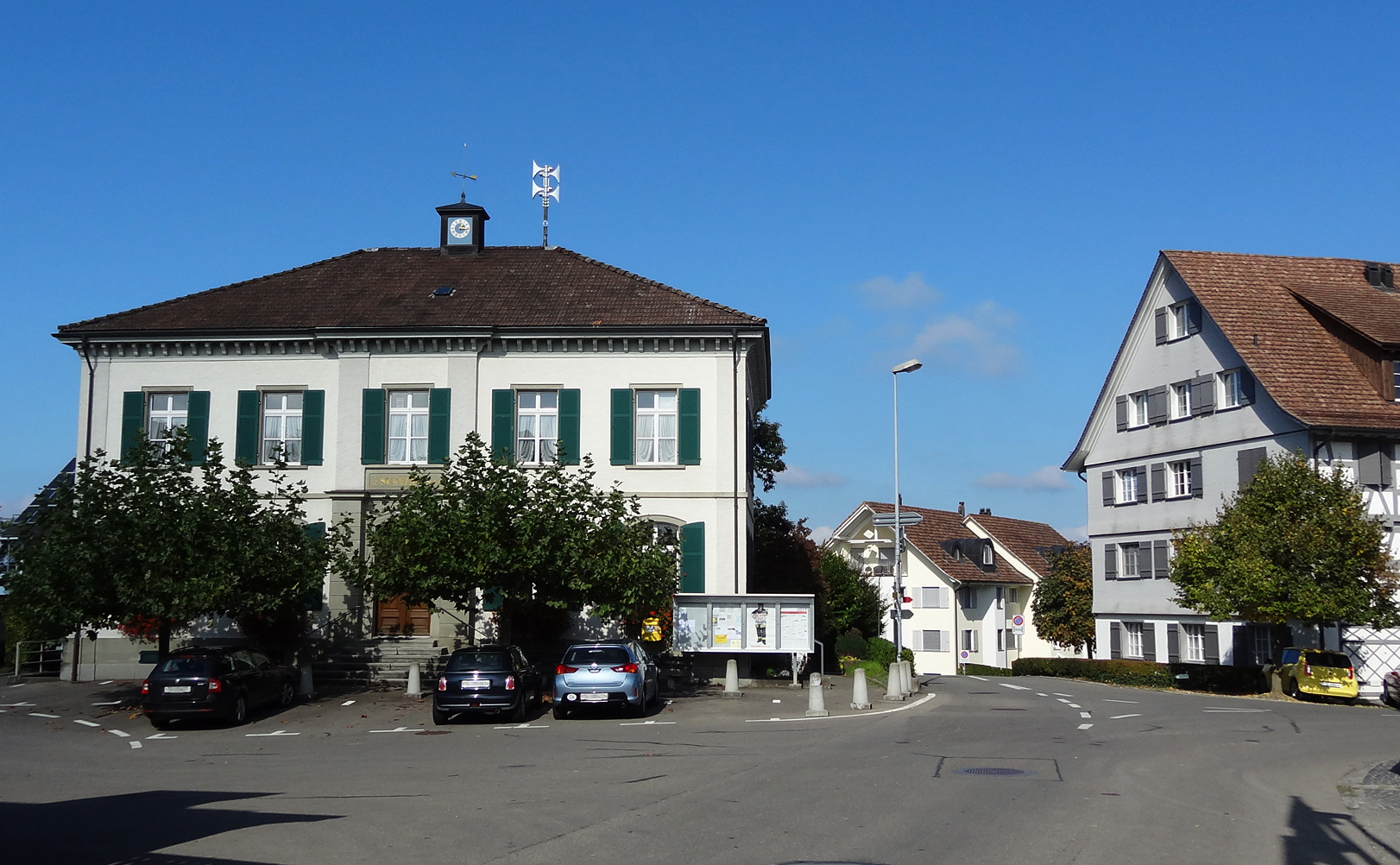

- Coat of arms
- Location of Salenstein
- Location within Switzerland Location within Canton of Thurgau
- Coordinates: 47°40′N 9°3′E
- Country: Switzerland
- Canton: Thurgau
- District: Kreuzlingen

Area
  - Total: 6.54 km^{2} (2.53 sq mi)
- Elevation: 400 m (1,300 ft)

Population (December 2007)
  - Total: 1,244
  - Density: 190/km^{2} (493/sq mi)
- Time zone: UTC+01:00 (CET)
  - Summer (DST): UTC+02:00 (CEST)
- Postal code: 8268
- SFOS number: 4851
- ISO 3166 code: CH-TG
- Surrounded by: Berlingen, Ermatingen, Gaienhofen (DE-BW), Raperswilen, Reichenau (DE-BW)
- Website: salenstein.ch

Salenstein is a municipality in Kreuzlingen District in the canton of Thurgau in Switzerland.

Salenstein was the home village of Napoleon III, who lived at Castle Arenenberg in his youth.

== History ==
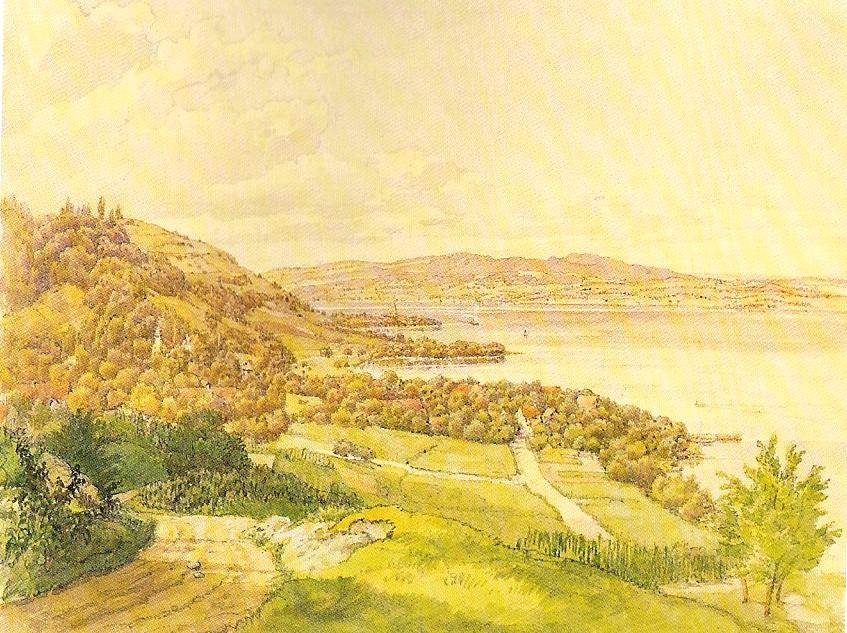
Mannenbach village in 1856

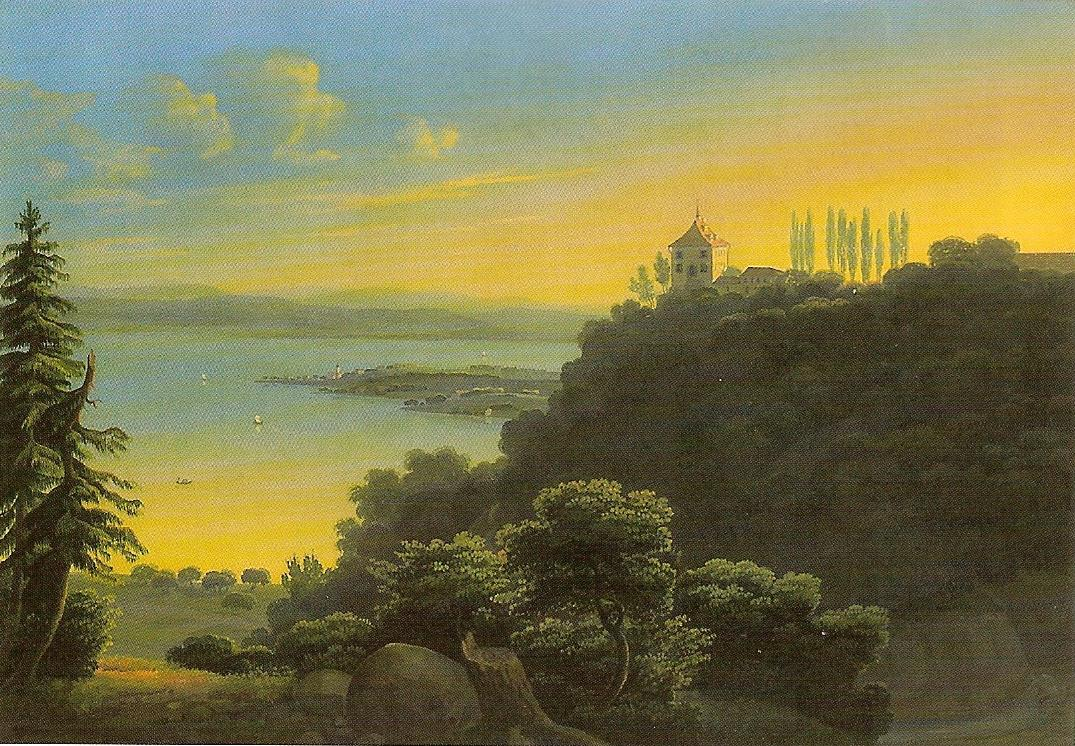
Sandegg Castle in 1832

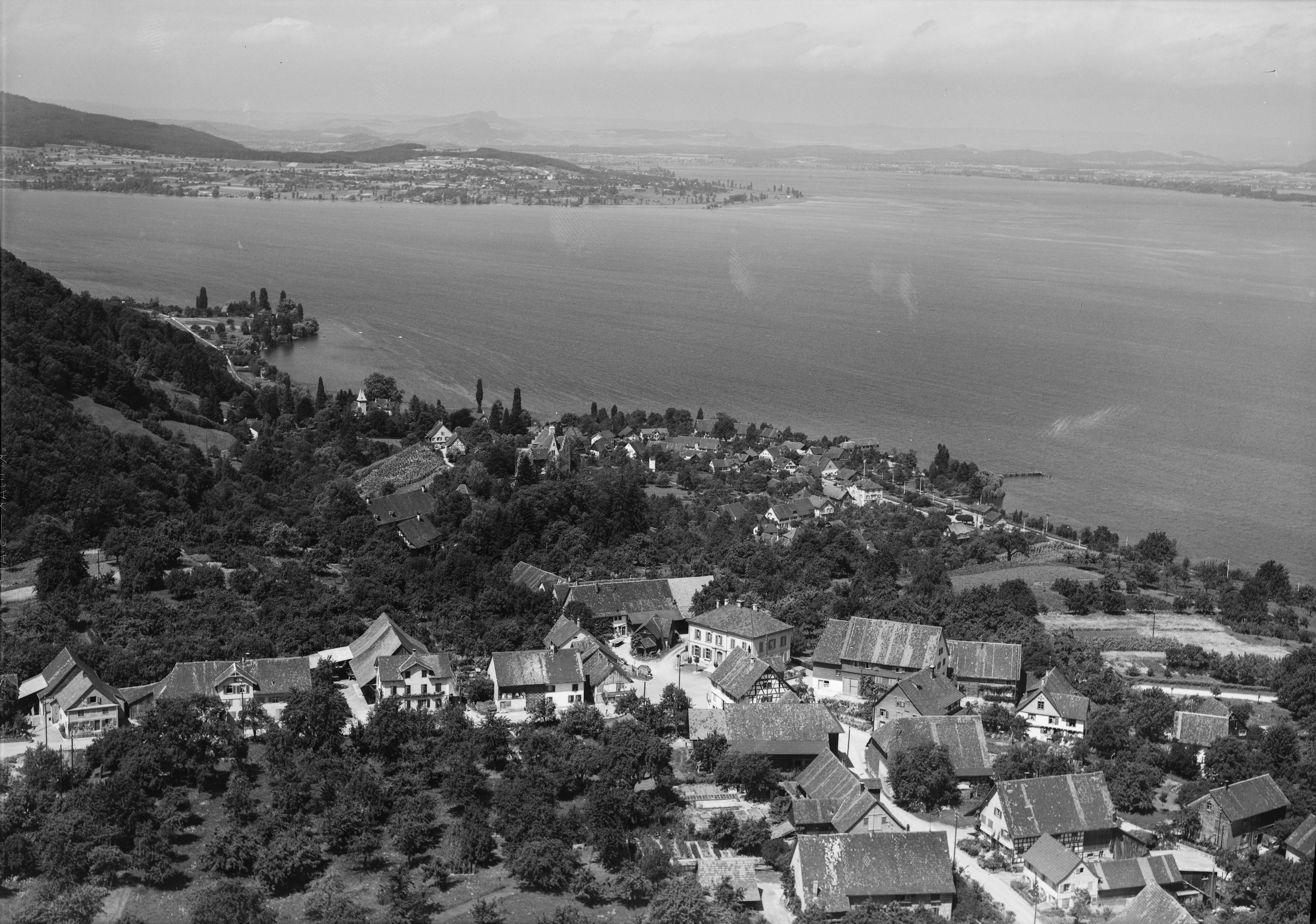
Aerial view (1954)

In the Eichholz area near Salenstein, burial mounds from the late Hallstatt period (750-450 BC) have been discovered. The modern village of Salenstein is first mentioned in 1092 as Salestein. In the 11th century, Salenstein Castle was built as a seat for the Ministerialis (unfree knights in the service of a feudal overlord) officials of Reichenau Abbey. The smaller castles of Sandegg and Riederen were added to provide further housing for the officials. The land rights, Herrschaft rights and the low court rights were all held by the abbey. In 1401, the noble Clare of Breitenstein, founded a Béguinage house in the Götschen woods, which was known as Blümlistobel. At some time before 1520 the Augustinian rule was introduced at the house. In 1534 a fire destroyed Blümlistobel house and it was rebuilt 1537. The last sister lived there until 1545, when she moved to Reichenau Abbey.

In the early modern period the villages incurred a massive debt. Mannenbach and Salenstein had to seek credit several times and 1573 they had to use their common forest (German: Allmend) as collateral for a loan.

A mild climate allows the production of wine, cherries and gardens. In 1750, a cottage industry of weavers and knitters developed. In 1817 the ex-Queen Hortense de Beauharnais of Holland acquired Arenenberg Castle for a residence while she was in exile. This resulted in additional job opportunities for the residents of the village. After periods of stagnation Salenstein began to grow again after 1950. It has one of the lowest tax rates of any municipality in Thurgau.

== Geography ==
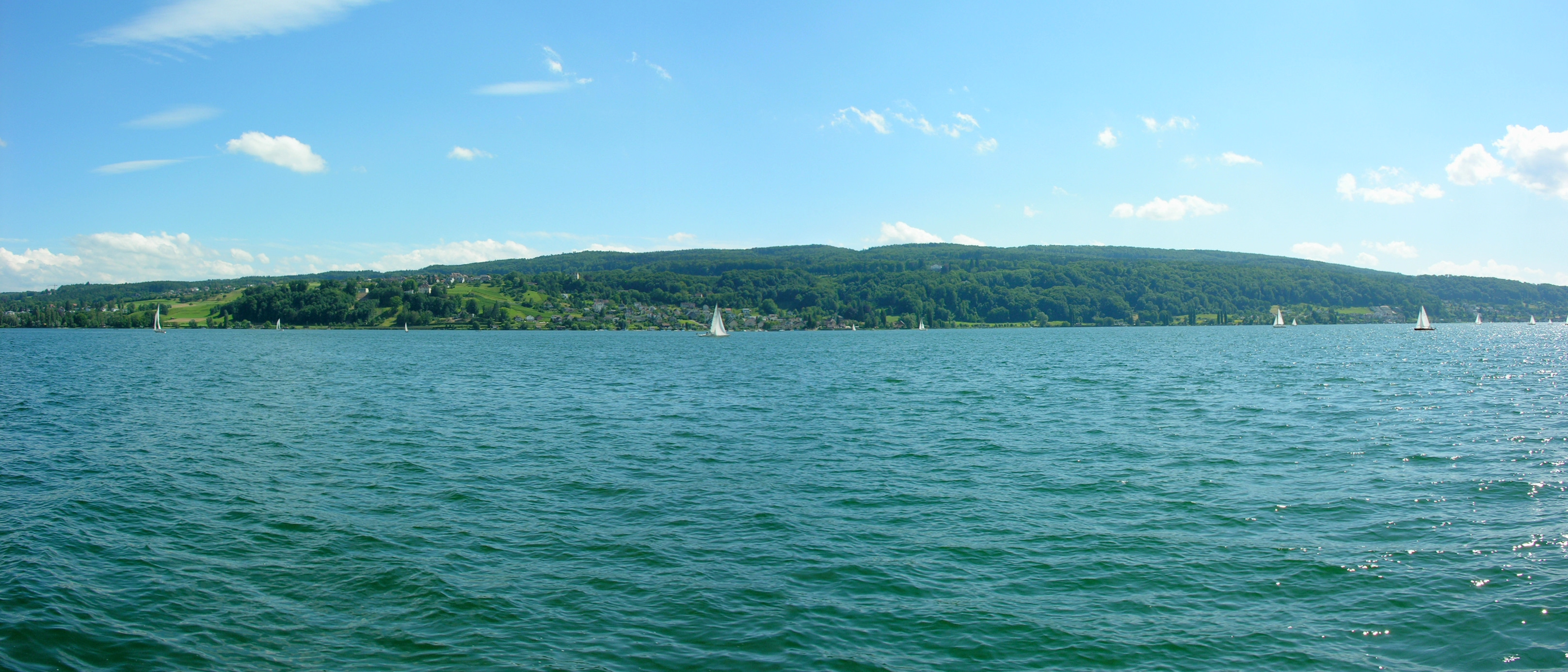
Untersee near Mannenbach and Salenstein

Salenstein has an area, as of 2009, of 6.54 square kilometers (2.53 sq mi). Of this area, 2.3 km^{2} (0.89 sq mi) or 35.2% is used for agricultural purposes, while 3.31 km^{2} (1.28 sq mi) or 50.6% is forested. Of the rest of the land, 0.89 km^{2} (0.34 sq mi) or 13.6% is settled (buildings or roads).

Of the built up area, industrial buildings made up 8.3% of the total area while housing and buildings made up 0.2% and transportation infrastructure made up 0.2%. while parks, green belts and sports fields made up 4.1%. Out of the forested land, 48.5% of the total land area is heavily forested and 2.1% is covered with orchards or small clusters of trees. Of the agricultural land, 28.0% is used for growing crops, while 7.2% is used for orchards or vine crops.

The municipality is located in Kreuzlingen District, on a terrace in the Seerücken hills between Berlingen and Ermatingen. It consists of the village of Salenstein and the hamlets of Fruthwilen and Mannenbach.

== Demographics ==
Salenstein has a population (as of December 2020) of 1,411. As of 2008, 22.8% of the population are foreign nationals. Over the last 10 years (1997–2007) the population has changed at a rate of 17.7%. Most of the population (as of 2000) speaks German (94.8%), with Portuguese being second most common ( 1.0%) and Albanian being third ( 0.9%).

As of 2008, the gender distribution of the population was 49.6% male and 50.4% female. The population was made up of 461 Swiss men (37.3% of the population), and 152 (12.3%) non-Swiss men. There were 494 Swiss women (39.9%), and 130 (10.5%) non-Swiss women. In 2008 there were 9 live births to Swiss citizens and births to non-Swiss citizens, and in same time span there were 10 deaths of Swiss citizens and 1 non-Swiss citizen death. Ignoring immigration and emigration, the population of Swiss citizens decreased by 1 while the foreign population decreased by 1. There were 11 non-Swiss men who emigrated from Switzerland to another country and 8 non-Swiss women who emigrated from Switzerland to another country. The total Swiss population change in 2008 (from all sources) was a decrease of 11 and the non-Swiss population change was an increase of 17 people. This represents a population growth rate of 0.5%.

The age distribution, as of 2009, in Salenstein is; 110 children or 8.8% of the population are between 0 and 9 years old and 106 teenagers or 8.4% are between 10 and 19. Of the adult population, 126 people or 10.0% of the population are between 20 and 29 years old. 139 people or 11.1% are between 30 and 39, 253 people or 20.1% are between 40 and 49, and 218 people or 17.4% are between 50 and 59. The senior population distribution is 164 people or 13.1% of the population are between 60 and 69 years old, 83 people or 6.6% are between 70 and 79, there are 45 people or 3.6% who are between 80 and 89, and there are 12 people or 1.0% who are 90 and older.

As of 2000, there were 487 private households in the municipality, and an average of 2.2 persons per household. In 2000 there were 251 single family homes (or 78.4% of the total) out of a total of 320 inhabited buildings. There were 38 two family buildings (11.9%), 13 three family buildings (4.1%) and 18 multi-family buildings (or 5.6%). There were 341 (or 30.8%) persons who were part of a couple without children, and 500 (or 45.1%) who were part of a couple with children. There were 54 (or 4.9%) people who lived in single parent home, while there are 11 persons who were adult children living with one or both parents, 4 persons who lived in a household made up of relatives, 8 who lived in a household made up of unrelated persons, and 28 who are either institutionalized or live in another type of collective housing. The vacancy rate for the municipality, in 2008, was 3.16%. As of 2007, the construction rate of new housing units was 10.6 new units per 1000 residents.

In 2000 there were 602 apartments in the municipality. The most common apartment size was the four-room apartment of which there were 157. There were 30 single-room apartments and 133 apartments with six or more rooms. As of 2000 the average price to rent an average apartment in Salenstein was 1228.12 Swiss francs (CHF) per month (US$980, £550, €790 approx. exchange rate from 2000). The average rate for a one-room apartment was 639.30 CHF (US$510, £290, €410), a two-room apartment was about 848.61 CHF (US$680, £380, €540), a three-room apartment was about 1069.35 CHF (US$860, £480, €680) and a six or more room apartment cost an average of 1805.63 CHF (US$1440, £810, €1160). The average apartment price in Salenstein was 110.% of the national average of 1116 CHF.

In the 2007 federal election the most popular party was the SVP which received 47.36% of the vote. The next three most popular parties were the CVP (13.41%), the FDP (12.83%) and the SP (11.18%). In the federal election, a total of 444 votes were cast, and the voter turnout was 54.4%.

The historical population is given in the following table:

year	population
1850	890
1860	857
1870	864
1880	801
1890	786
1900	782
1950	850
1960	921
1980	882
1990	986
2000	1,108

== Heritage sites of national significance ==
There are three castles; Arenenberg (with chapel and Napoleon Museum), Eugensberg and Louisenberg as well as the pilgrimage chapel of St. Aloysius in Mannenbach on Louisenbergstrasse 14 that are listed as Swiss heritage sites of national significance. The villages of Salenstein and Mannenbach and the Untersee region (including Ermatingen, Gottlieben, Kreuzlingen, Salenstein and Tägerwilen) are designated as part of the Inventory of Swiss Heritage Sites.

Arenenberg Castle was built in the early 16th century by the mayor of Constance (1546–1548) Sebastian Geissberg. The estate saw a number of owners. In 1817, Johann Baptist von Streng sold it to the exiled Hortense de Beauharnais, the daughter of ex-Empress Joséphine, for 30,000 guilders. As arranged by Napoleon, Hortense had to marry his brother Louis Bonaparte, and the couple were named King and Queen of the Netherlands (1806 to 1810). The royal couple not only suffered with the demise of the rule of Napoleon, but also had an unhappy marriage leading to a separation. Hortense initiated reconstructions and renovations in an attempt to recreate the atmosphere of Malmaison. The surrounding park was possibly designed by Louis-Martin Berthault. In 1818 she moved in. Her brother, Eugène de Beauharnais, bought the nearby Sandegg Castle and built a villa close by.

While Hortense initially spent time at her house in Augsburg, Arenenberg soon became her main domicile. At her Parisian-styled salon she entertained many luminaries. Her son Louis Napoléon, the future emperor Napoléon III, who had attended school in Augsburg, visited Arenenberg as a teenager; there he was further educated and then attended the Swiss military academy at Thun, receiving Swiss citizenship. In 1837, while he was exiled and living in New York City, Louis Napoleon received notice of his mother's deteriorating health and returned to Arenenberg. Hortense died on 5 October 1837. After mourning, Louis Napoleon had to leave Switzerland, due to French pressure, and moved to London. In 1843, in need of money to finance his aspirations, he sold the property to Heinrich Keller. Once he was emperor, his empress Eugénie bought it back in 1855. Further renovations were made between 1855 and 1874.

After Napoleon III's death, Eugénie visited Arenenberg several times before she donated it in 1906 to the Canton Thurgau.

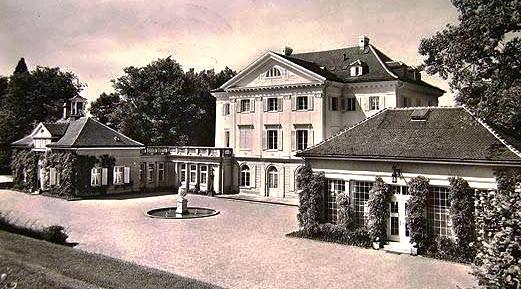
Eugensberg castle

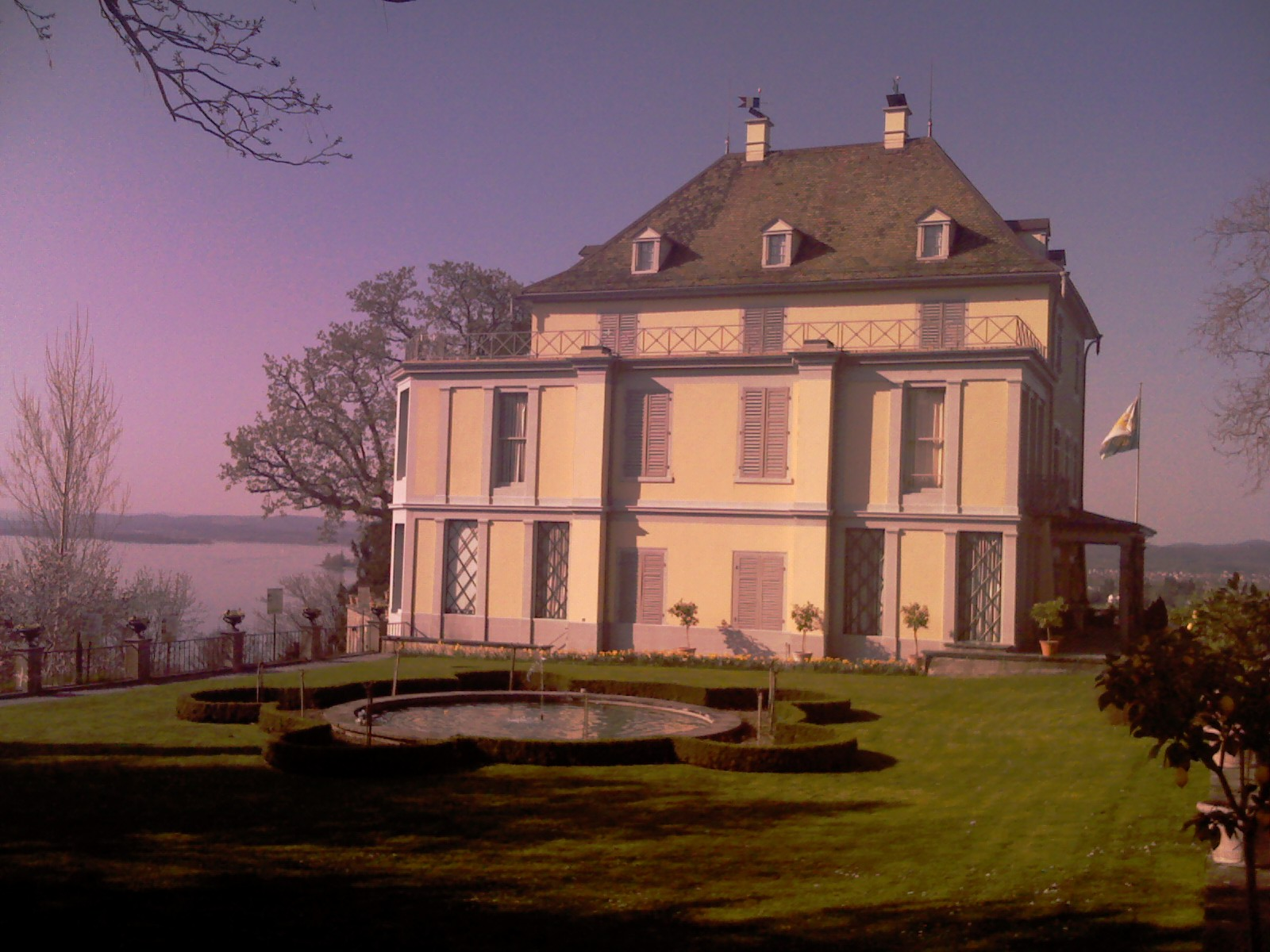
Arenenberg castle

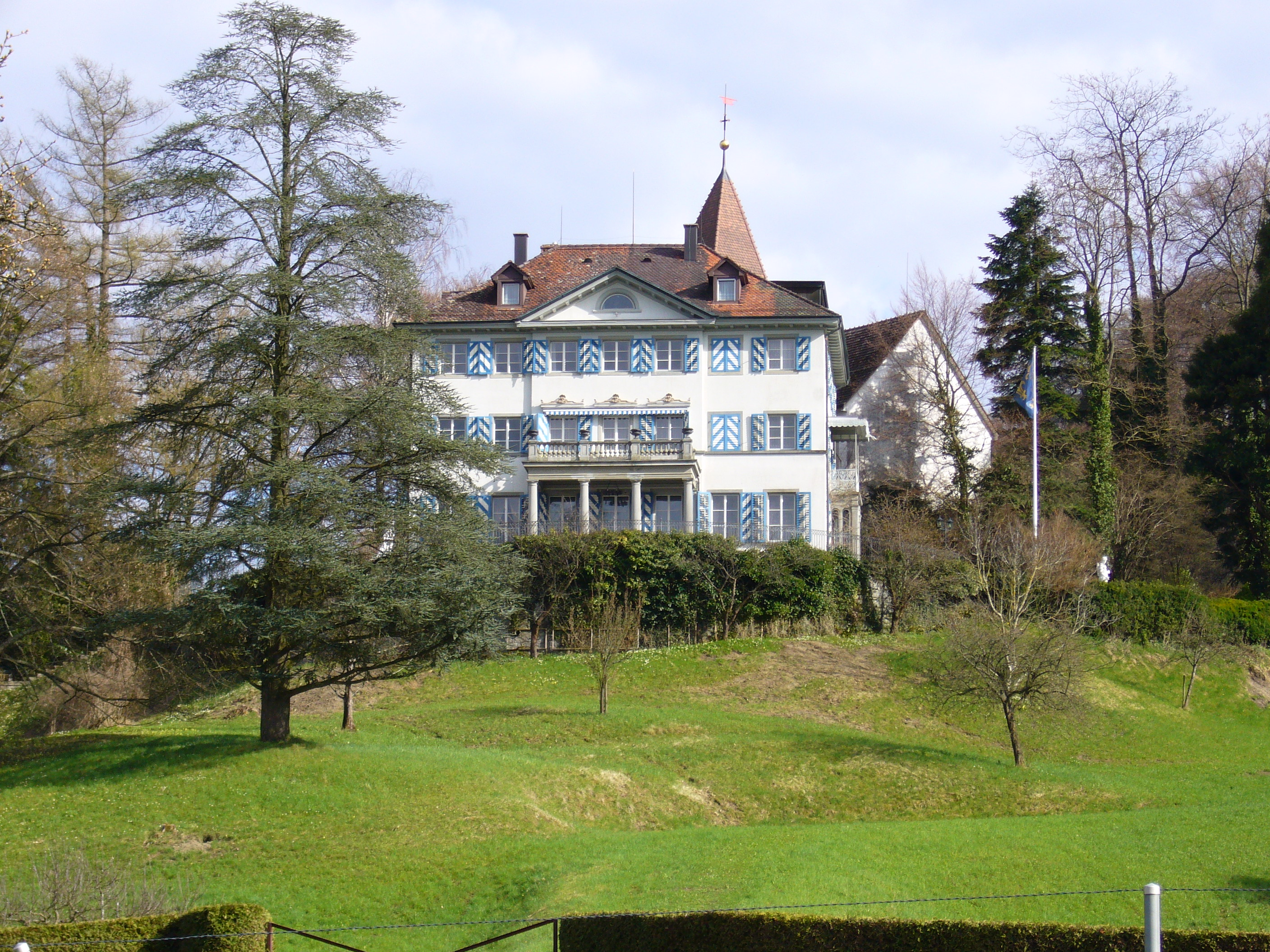
Louisenberg Castle

== Economy ==
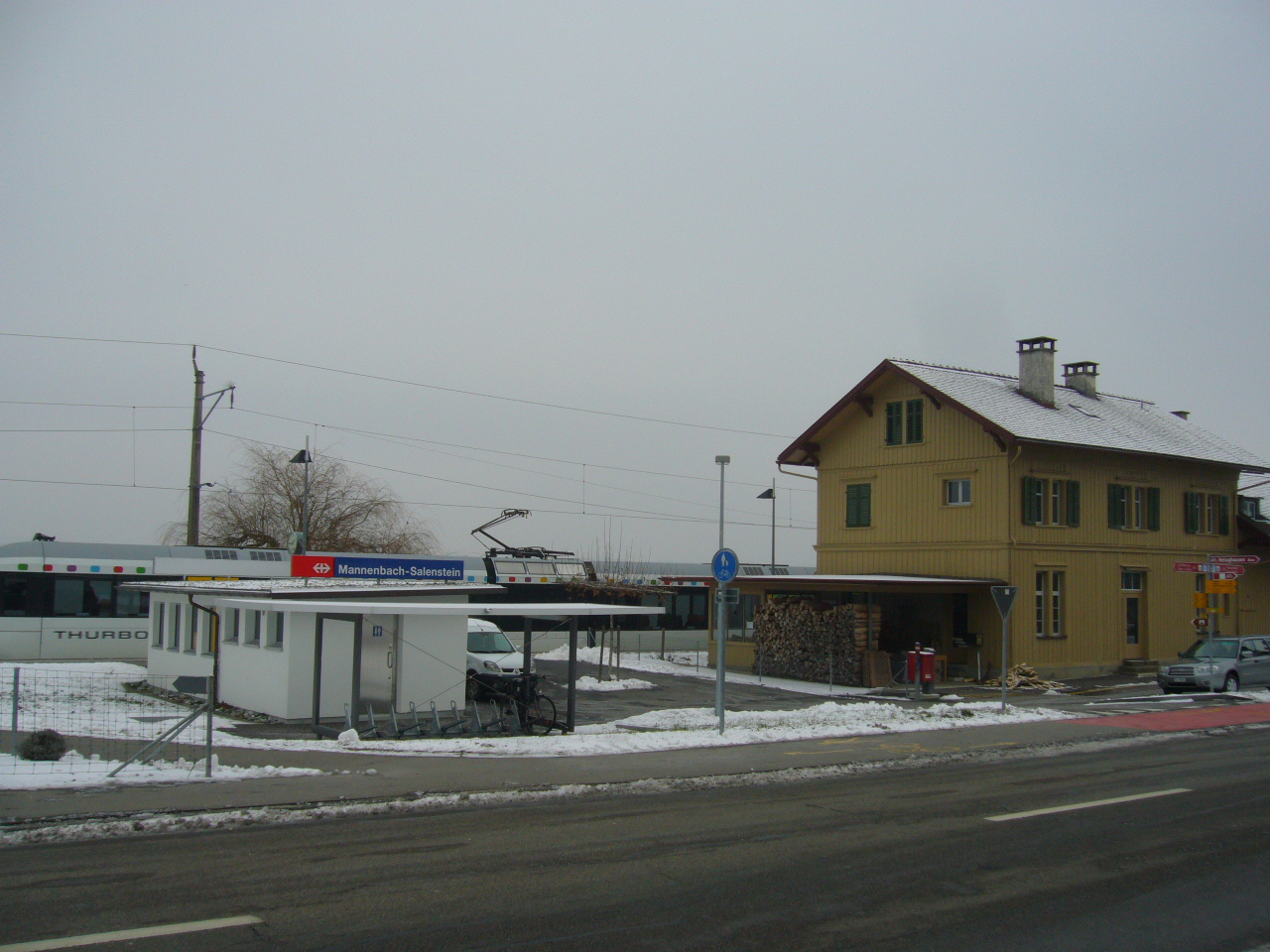
Mannenbach-Salenstein train station, about half the residents of Salenstein commute to jobs outside the municipality.

As of 2007, Salenstein had an unemployment rate of 1.49%. As of 2005, there were 49 people employed in the primary economic sector and about 16 businesses involved in this sector. 67 people are employed in the secondary sector and there are 16 businesses in this sector. 215 people are employed in the tertiary sector, with 46 businesses in this sector.

In 2000 there were 773 workers who lived in the municipality. Of these, 373 or about 48.3% of the residents worked outside Salenstein while 135 people commuted into the municipality for work. There were a total of 535 jobs (of at least 6 hours per week) in the municipality. Of the working population, 6.6% used public transportation to get to work, and 52.7% used a private car.

== Religion ==
From the 2000 census, 318 or 28.7% were Roman Catholic, while 572 or 51.6% belonged to the Swiss Reformed Church. Of the rest of the population, there is 1 individual who belongs to the Orthodox Church, and there are 16 individuals (or about 1.44% of the population) who belong to another Christian church. There were 20 (or about 1.81% of the population) who are Islamic. There are 6 individuals (or about 0.54% of the population) who belong to another church (not listed on the census), 140 (or about 12.64% of the population) belong to no church, are agnostic or atheist, and 35 individuals (or about 3.16% of the population) did not answer the question.

== Transport ==
Salenstein sits on the Lake Line between Schaffhausen and Rorschach and is served by the St. Gallen S-Bahn at Mannenbach-Salenstein railway station.

Mannenbach has a landing stage. Between spring and autumn, the URh offers regular boat services on the High Rhine and Untersee between Schaffhausen and Kreuzlingen, via Konstanz.

== Education ==
In Salenstein about 83.6% of the population (between age 25–64) have completed either non-mandatory upper secondary education or additional higher education (either university or a Fachhochschule).

Salenstein is home to the Salenstein combined municipal and primary school district. In the 2008/2009 school year there are 66 students. There are 16 children in the kindergarten, and the average class size is 16 kindergartners. Of the children in kindergarten, 8 or 50.0% are female, 5 or 31.3% are not Swiss citizens. The lower and upper primary levels begin at about age 5-6 and lasts for 6 years. There are 26 children in who are at the lower primary level and 24 children in the upper primary level. The average class size in the primary school is 16.67 students. At the lower primary level, there are 18 children or 69.2% of the total population who are female and 5 or 19.2% are not Swiss citizens. In the upper primary level, there are 11 or 45.8% who are female and 3 or 12.5% are not Swiss citizens.
