= Eschenz railway station =

Railway station in Switzerland

Eschenz
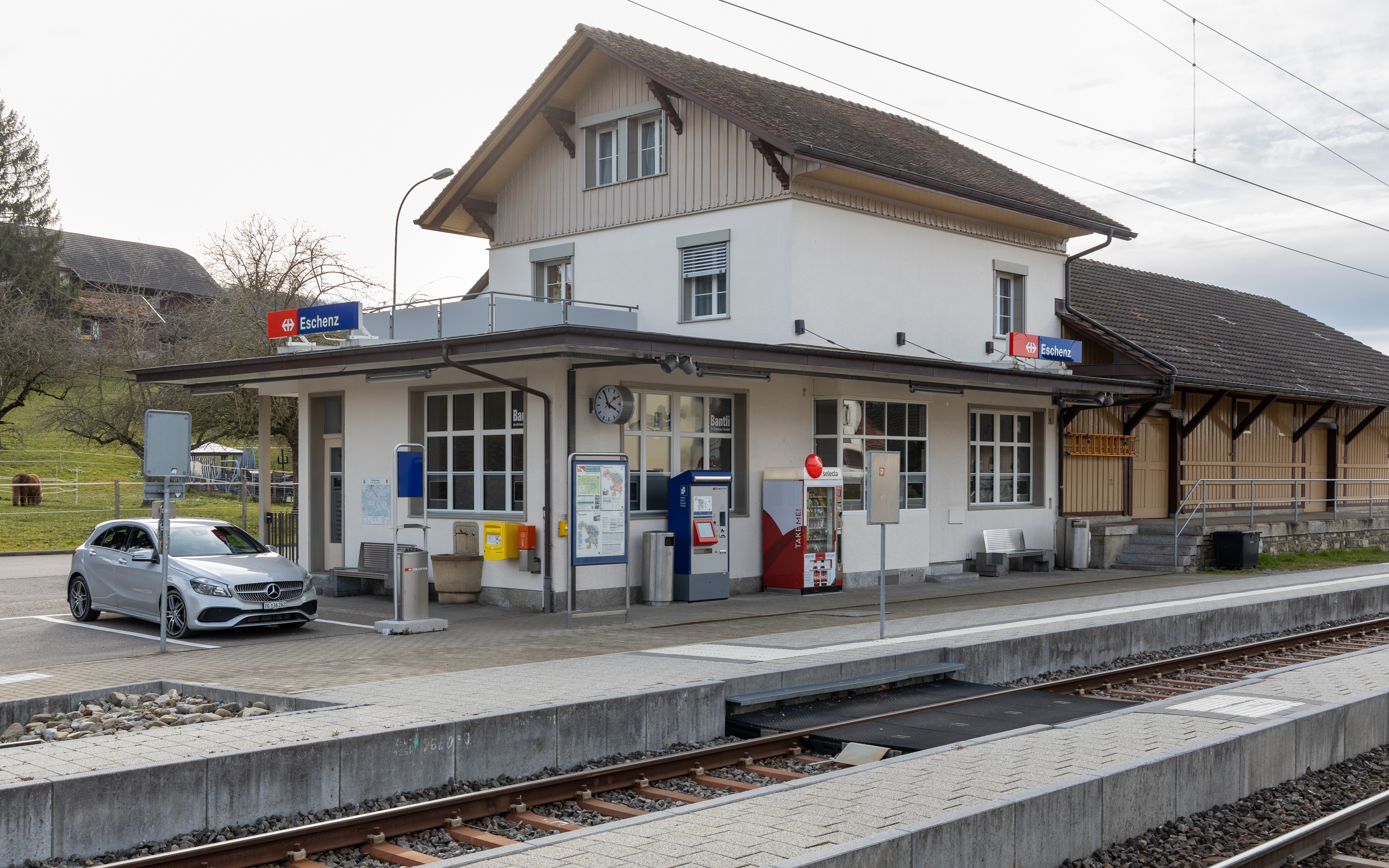

General information
- Location: Eschenz; Switzerland
- Coordinates: 47°38′30″N 8°52′49″E
- Elevation: 417 m (1,368 ft)
- Owner: Swiss Federal Railways
- Line: Lake line
- Train operators: Thurbo

Other information
- Fare zone: 845 (Tarifverbund Ostschweiz)

Services
Preceding station	St. Gallen S-Bahn	Following station
Stein am Rhein towards Schaffhausen	S1	Mammern towards Wil
Location
- Location within Switzerland Location within Canton of Thurgau

Eschenz railway station (German: Bahnhof Eschenz) is a railway station in Eschenz, in the Swiss canton of Thurgau. It is an intermediate stop on the Lake line and is served as a request stop by local trains only.

The station is close to the southern shore of the Untersee (Lake Constance).

== Services ==
Eschenz is served by the S1 of the St. Gallen S-Bahn:

- S1: half-hourly service between Schaffhausen and Wil via St. Gallen.

== See also ==
- Rail transport in Switzerland
