= Steckborn railway station =

Railway station in Switzerland

Steckborn
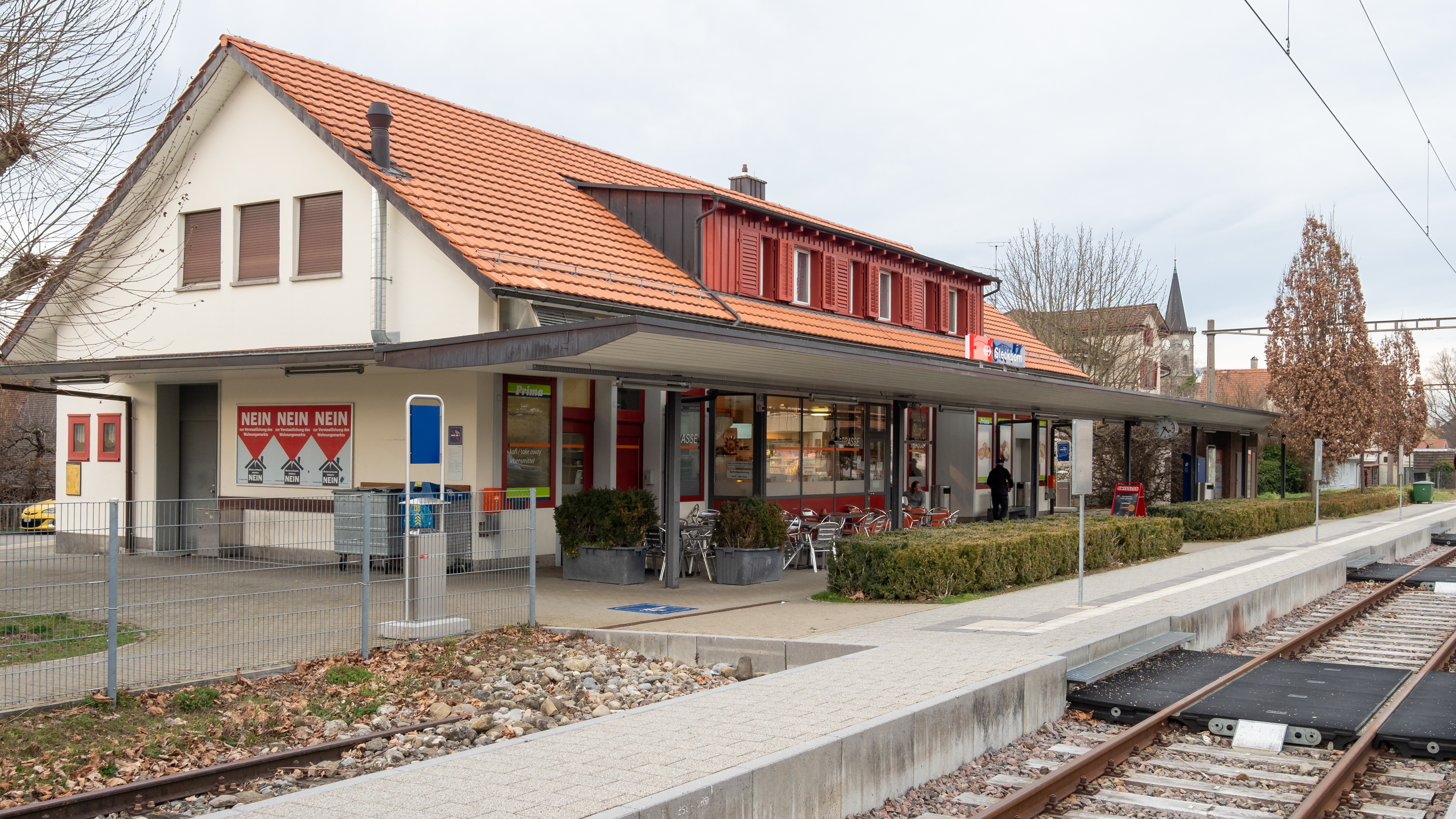

General information
- Location: Steckborn; Switzerland
- Coordinates: 47°39′31″N 8°58′37″E
- Elevation: 404 m (1,325 ft)
- Owner: Swiss Federal Railways
- Line: Lake line
- Train operators: Thurbo
- Connections
- Ship: URh passenger ships
- Bus: PostAuto bus route 826

Other information
- Fare zone: 953 / 954 (Tarifverbund Ostschweiz)

Services
Preceding station	St. Gallen S-Bahn	Following station
Mammern towards Schaffhausen	S1	Berlingen towards Wil
Location
- Location within Switzerland Location within Canton of Thurgau

Steckborn railway station (German: Bahnhof Steckborn) is a railway station in Steckborn, in the Swiss canton of Thurgau. It is an intermediate stop on the Lake line and is served by local trains only. It lies on the border between fare zones 953 and 954 of the Ostwind fare network.

The station is close to the southern shore of the Untersee (Lake Constance).

== Services ==
Steckborn is served by the S1 of the St. Gallen S-Bahn:

- S1: half-hourly service between Schaffhausen and Wil via St. Gallen.

PostAuto buses depart from the station forecourt. A nearby landing stage, ca. 600 m (2,000 ft) to the north, is served by passenger boats of Schweizerische Schifffahrtsgesellschaft Untersee und Rhein (URh), which operate between Schaffhausen and Kreuzlingen.

== See also ==
- Rail transport in Switzerland
