= Berlingen railway station =

Railway station in Switzerland

Berlingen
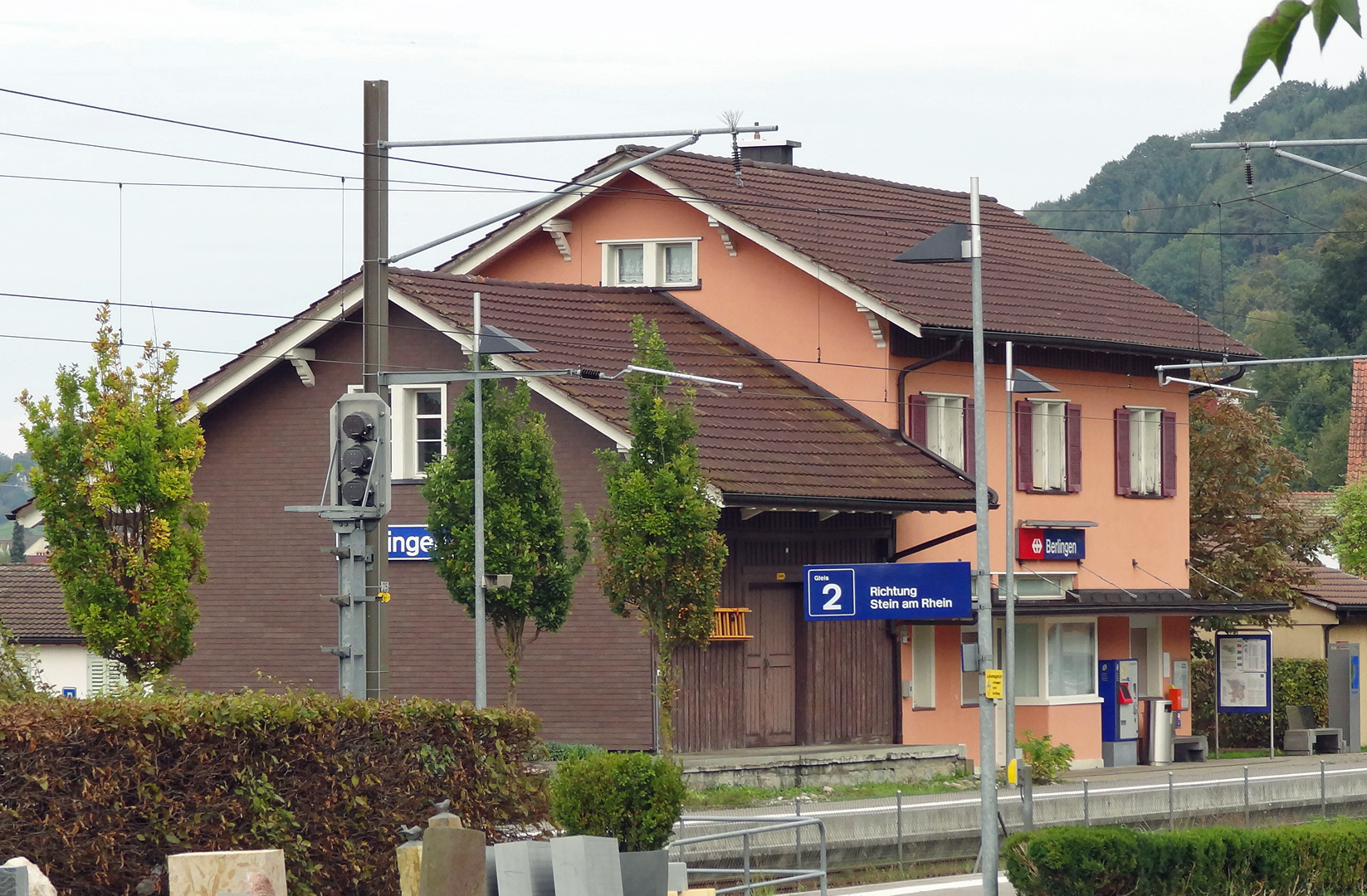
- The station building in 2014

General information
- Location: Berlingen; Switzerland
- Coordinates: 47°40′0″N 9°1′6″E
- Elevation: 403 m (1,322 ft)
- Owner: Swiss Federal Railways
- Line: Lake line
- Platforms: 2 side platforms
- Tracks: 2
- Train operators: Thurbo
- Connections
- Ship: URh passenger ships

Other information
- Fare zone: 954 (Tarifverbund Ostschweiz)

Services
Preceding station	St. Gallen S-Bahn	Following station
Steckborn towards Schaffhausen	S1	Mannenbach-Salenstein towards Wil
Location
- Location within Switzerland Location within Canton of Thurgau

Berlingen railway station (German: Bahnhof Berlingen) is a railway station in Berlingen, in the Swiss canton of Thurgau. It is an intermediate stop on the Lake line and is served by local trains only.

The station is close to the southern shore of the Untersee (Lake Constance).

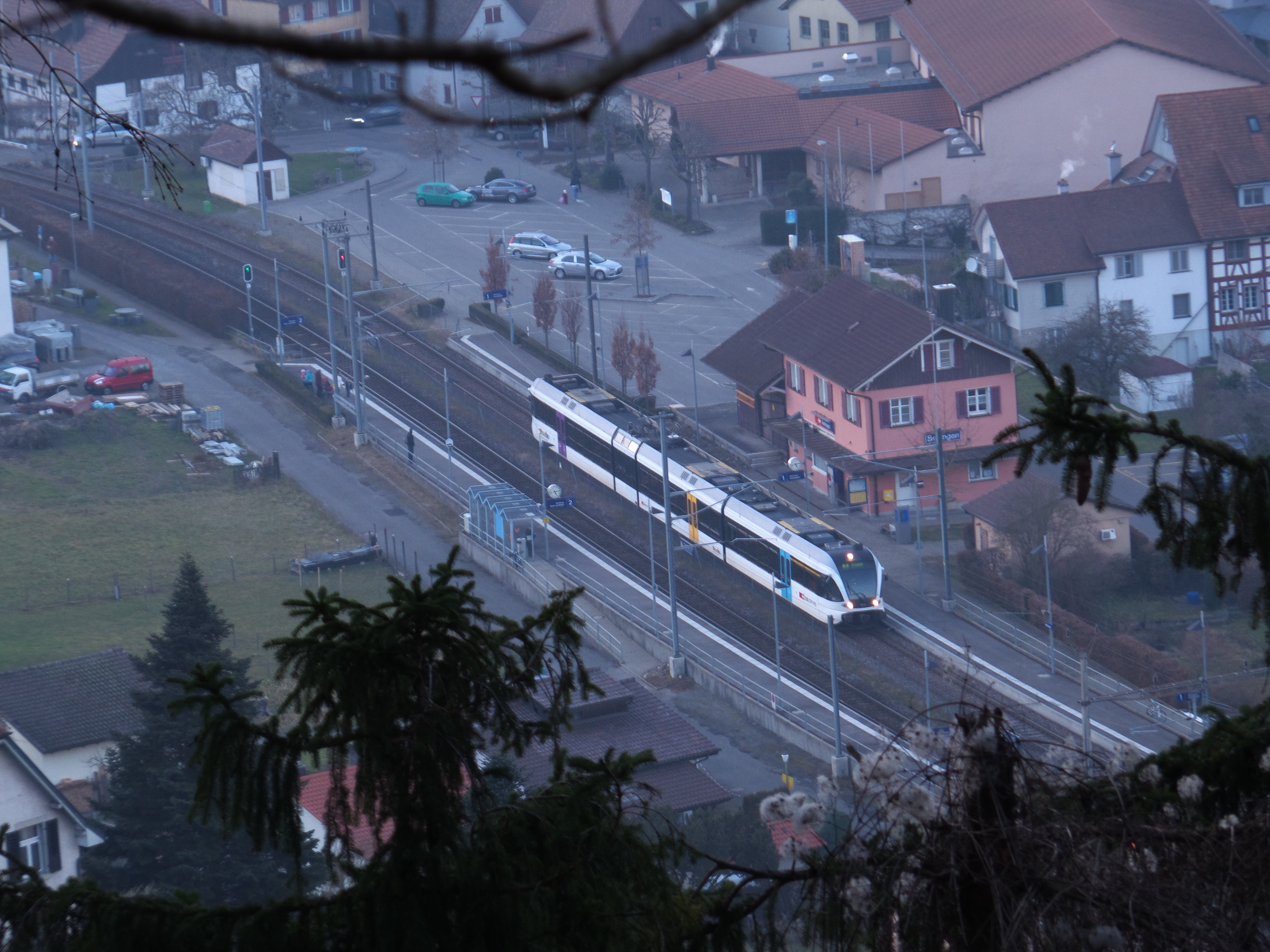
A trainset of Thurbo at the station

== Services ==
Berlingen is served by the S1 of the St. Gallen S-Bahn, as a request stop:

- S1: half-hourly service between Schaffhausen and Wil via St. Gallen.

A nearby landing stage, ca. 500 m (1,600 ft) to the northwest, is served by passenger boats of Schweizerische Schifffahrtsgesellschaft Untersee und Rhein (URh), which operate between Schaffhausen and Kreuzlingen.

== See also ==
- Rail transport in Switzerland
