= Mammern railway station =

Railway station in Mammern, Switzerland

Mammern
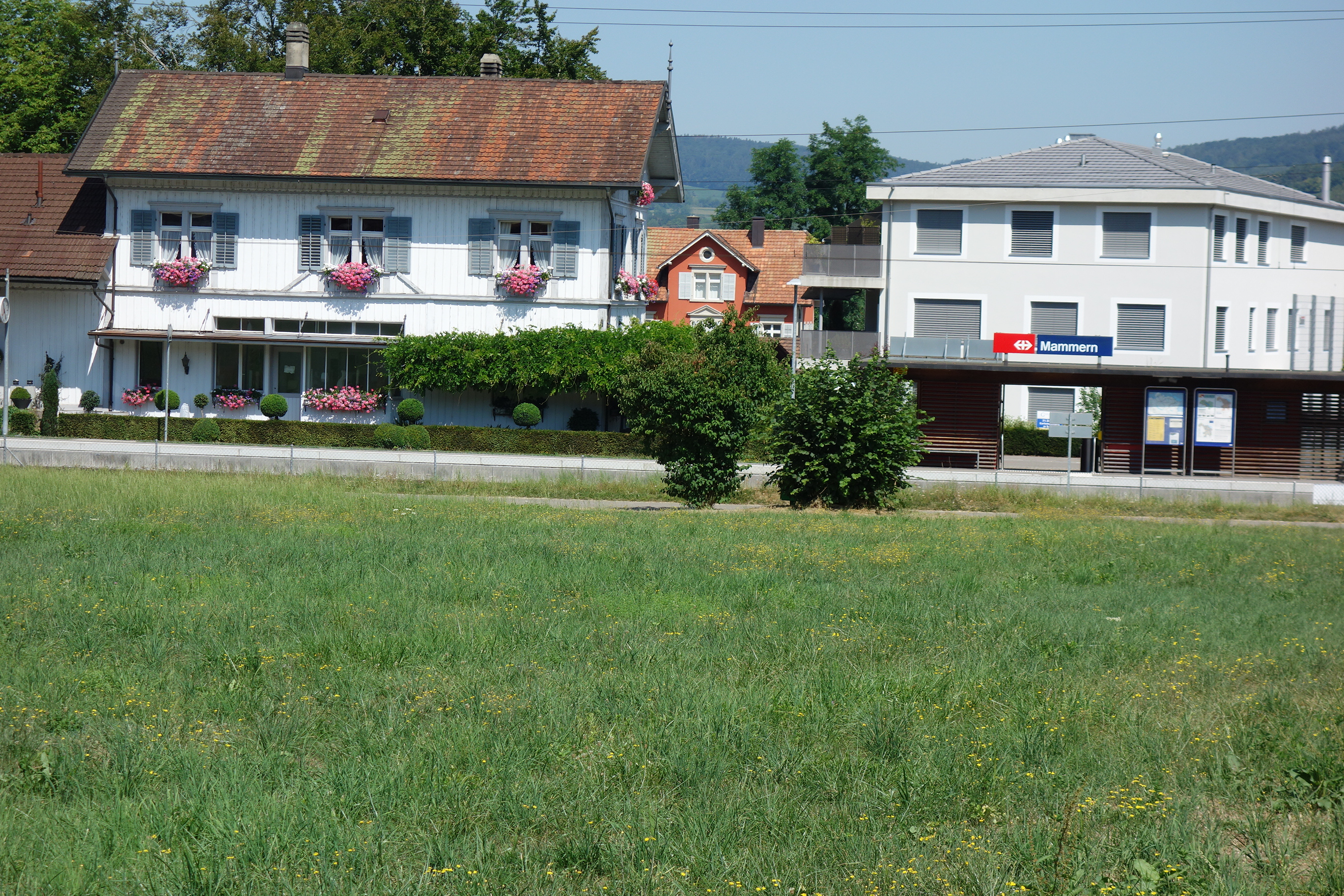
- The former (left) station building and current shelter in 2019

General information
- Location: Mammern; Switzerland
- Coordinates: 47°38′39″N 8°54′50.03″E
- Elevation: 412 m (1,352 ft)
- Owner: Swiss Federal Railways
- Line: Lake line
- Train operators: Thurbo
- Connections
- Ship: URh passenger ships

Other information
- Fare zone: 845 / 953 (Tarifverbund Ostschweiz)

Services
Preceding station	St. Gallen S-Bahn	Following station
Eschenz towards Schaffhausen	S1	Steckborn towards Wil
Location
- Location within Switzerland Location within Canton of Thurgau

Mammern railway station (German: Bahnhof Mammern) is a railway station in Mammern, in the Swiss canton of Thurgau. It is an intermediate stop on the Lake line and is served by local trains only. It lies on the border between fare zones 845 and 953 of the Ostwind fare network.

The original station building is now a private home; passengers use a wooden shelter on the platform. The station is close to the southern shore of the Untersee (Lake Constance).

== Services ==
Mammern is served by the S1 of the St. Gallen S-Bahn, as a request stop:

- S1: half-hourly service between Schaffhausen and Wil via St. Gallen.

A nearby landing stage, ca. 550 m (1,800 ft) to the north, is served by passenger boats of Schweizerische Schifffahrtsgesellschaft Untersee und Rhein (URh), which operate between Schaffhausen and Kreuzlingen.

== See also ==
- Rail transport in Switzerland
