= Munot =

Fortress in Schaffhausen, Suiza

- Schaffhausen
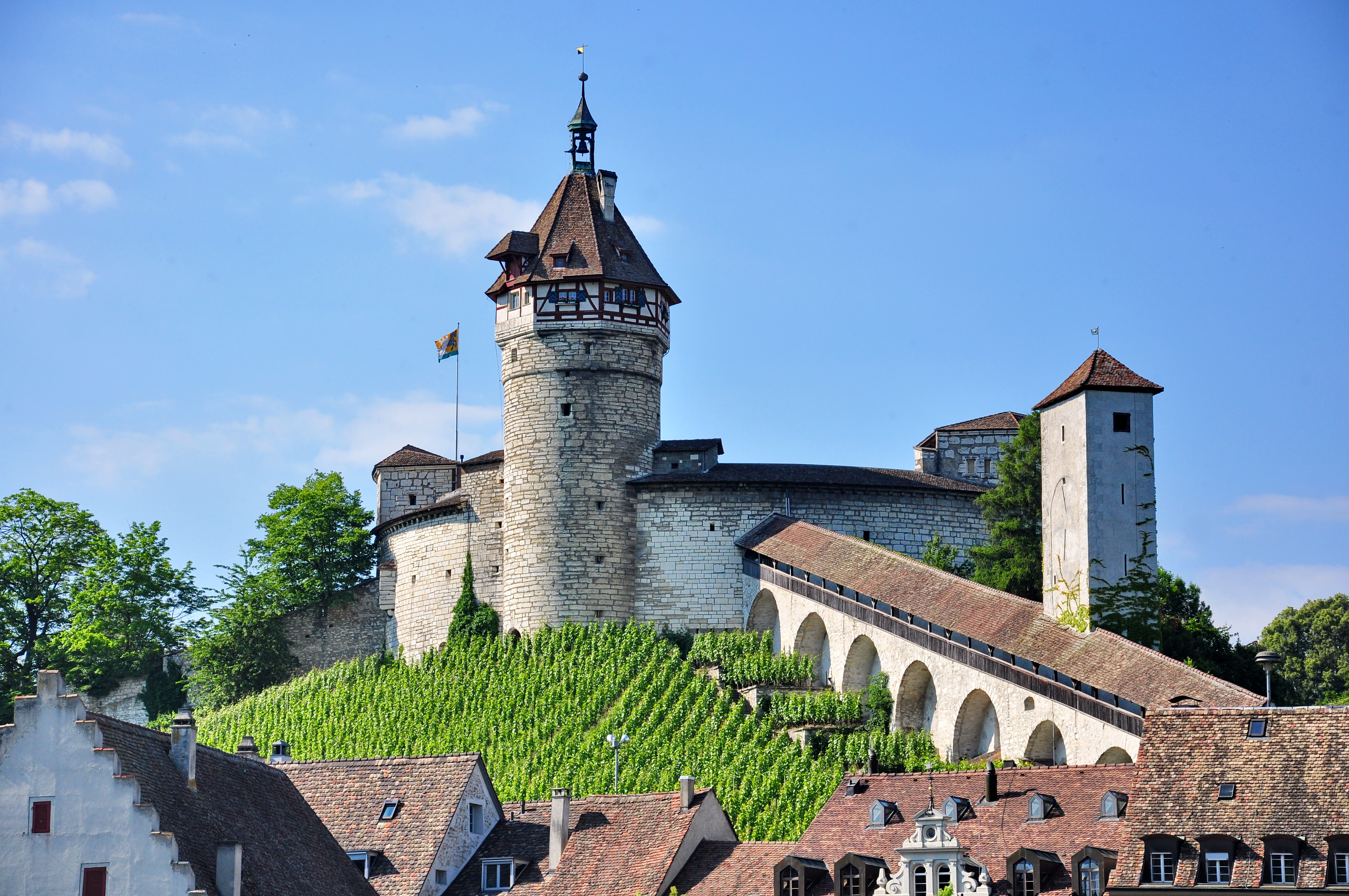
- Munot fortifications, view from Feuerthalen

Site information
- Code: CH-SH
- Condition: preserved

Location
- Location within Canton of Schaffhausen Location within Switzerland
- Coordinates: 47°41′49″N 8°38′23″E
- Height: 433 m above the sea

Site history
- Built: 1564–1589

The Munot is a circular 16th-century fortification on Emmersberg hill in Schaffhausen, Switzerland, and is one of the city's landmarks. It is surrounded by vineyards, which have been cultivated since the early 20th century. The Munot was built between 1564 and 1589, partly using compulsory labor (Frondienst), as part of Schaffhausen's defences. The site had earlier fortifications, with references to a structure called Annot in 1376 and Unot in 1460.

The Munot's circular plan was strongly influenced by the fortress designs of Albrecht Dürer. Its lower level has a hexagonal trench with caponiers (defensive turrets). Above it are circular casemates and a battlement platform. A tower on the side facing the city rises to around 50 metres.

== History ==
In 1905, a fallow deer colony was introduced into the Munot moat by the Verschönerungsverein Schaffhausen and was transferred to city ownership in 1927. As of 2015, the animals were under the care of Grün Schaffhausen, which commissioned an expert report confirming their good health.

According to a 2019 Swissinfo article, the role of the Guardian of the Munot dates back to 1377, predating the current 16th-century structure. The guardian traditionally lived with their family in the tower and was responsible for monitoring the town, sounding an alarm in case of danger, and ringing the Munot bell each evening at 9 p.m. This bell marked the time for city gates to close and for taverns and shops to shut. The ritual has remained a daily tradition carried out by the resident guardian.

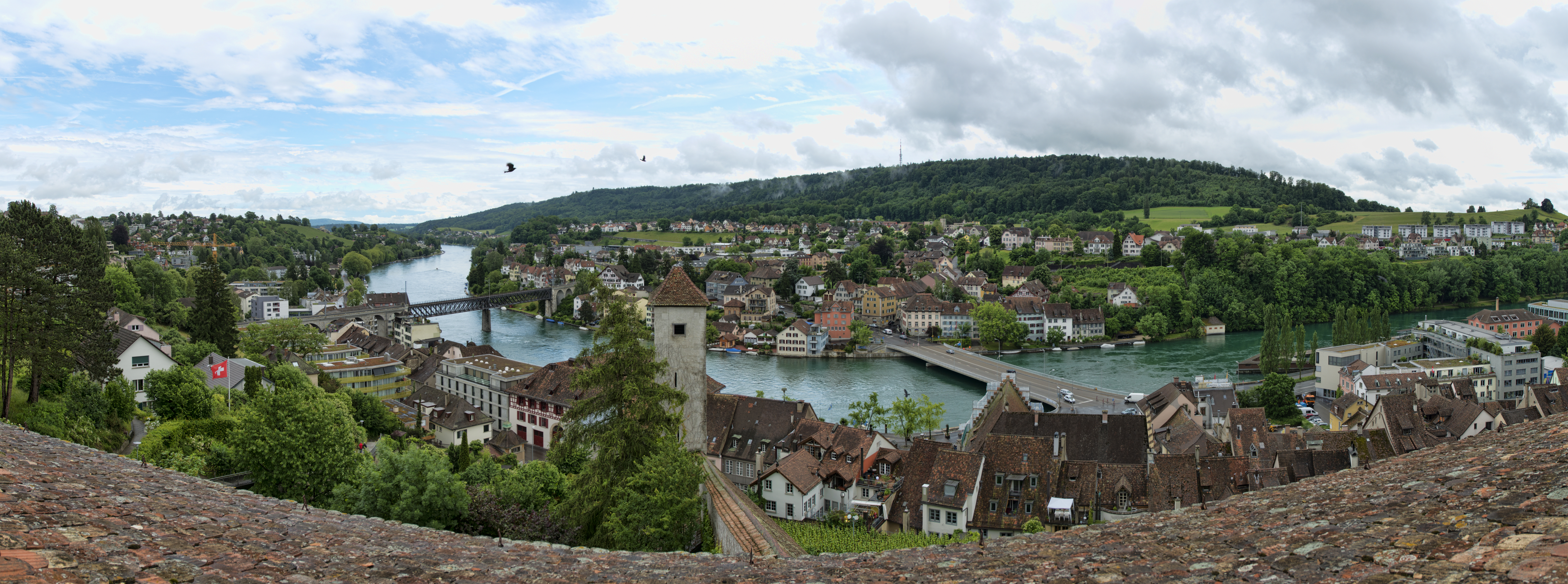
Panorama of Schaffhausen from the Munot

== Transport ==
Munot can be reached on foot from the old town of Schaffhausen via several stairs. There are nearby bus stops (Künzleheim/Huus Emmersberg) served by line 4 of Verkehrsbetriebe Schaffhausen (VBSH). There is also a nearby parking lot to the north of Munot. Below the Munot, on the High Rhine, there is a landing stage of the Schweizerische Schifffahrtsgesellschaft Untersee und Rhein (URh), linking Schaffhausen with Stein am Rhein and Konstanz (Lake Constance).

== Gallery ==
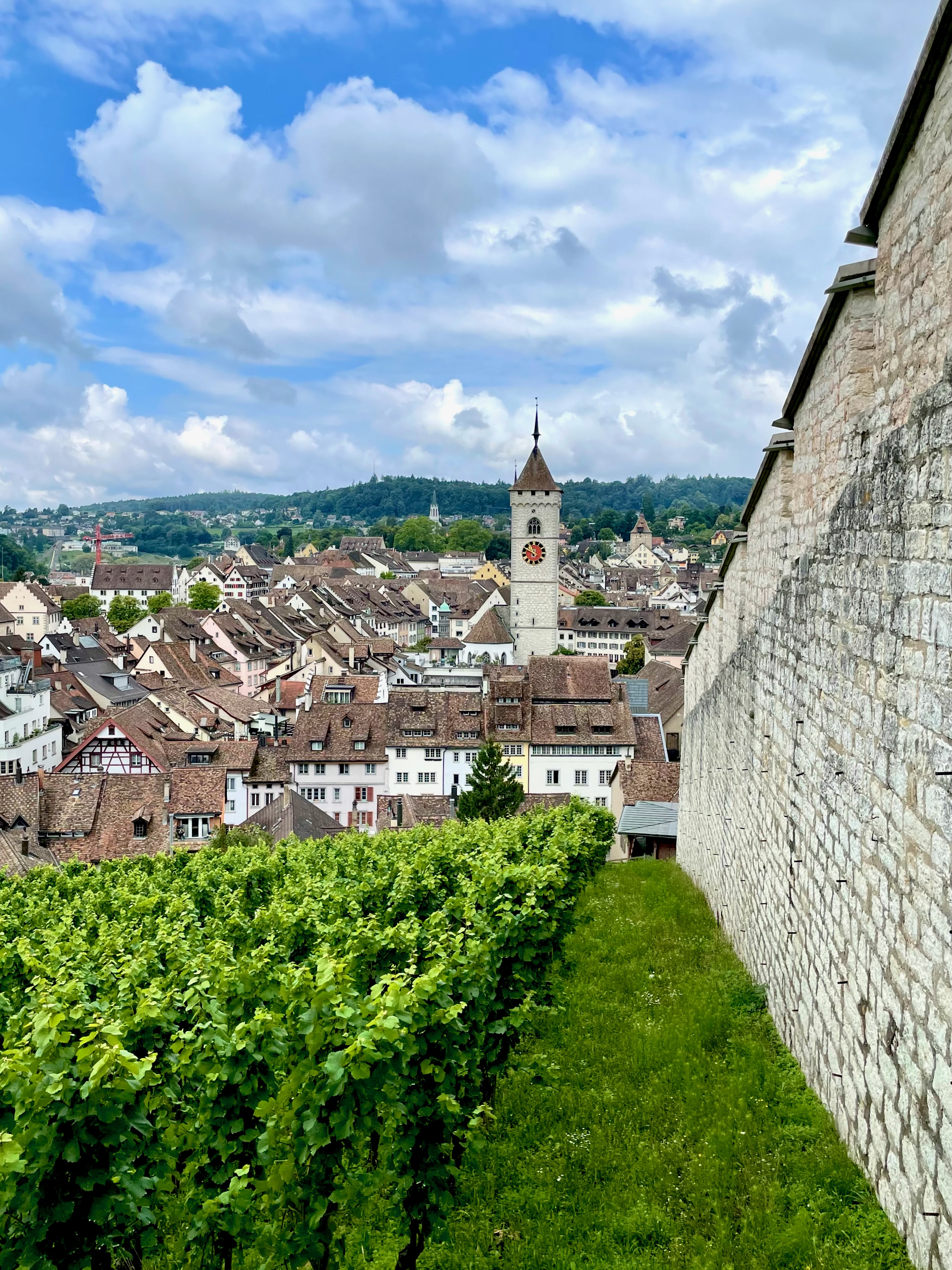
Schaffhausen old town from the Munot vineyards

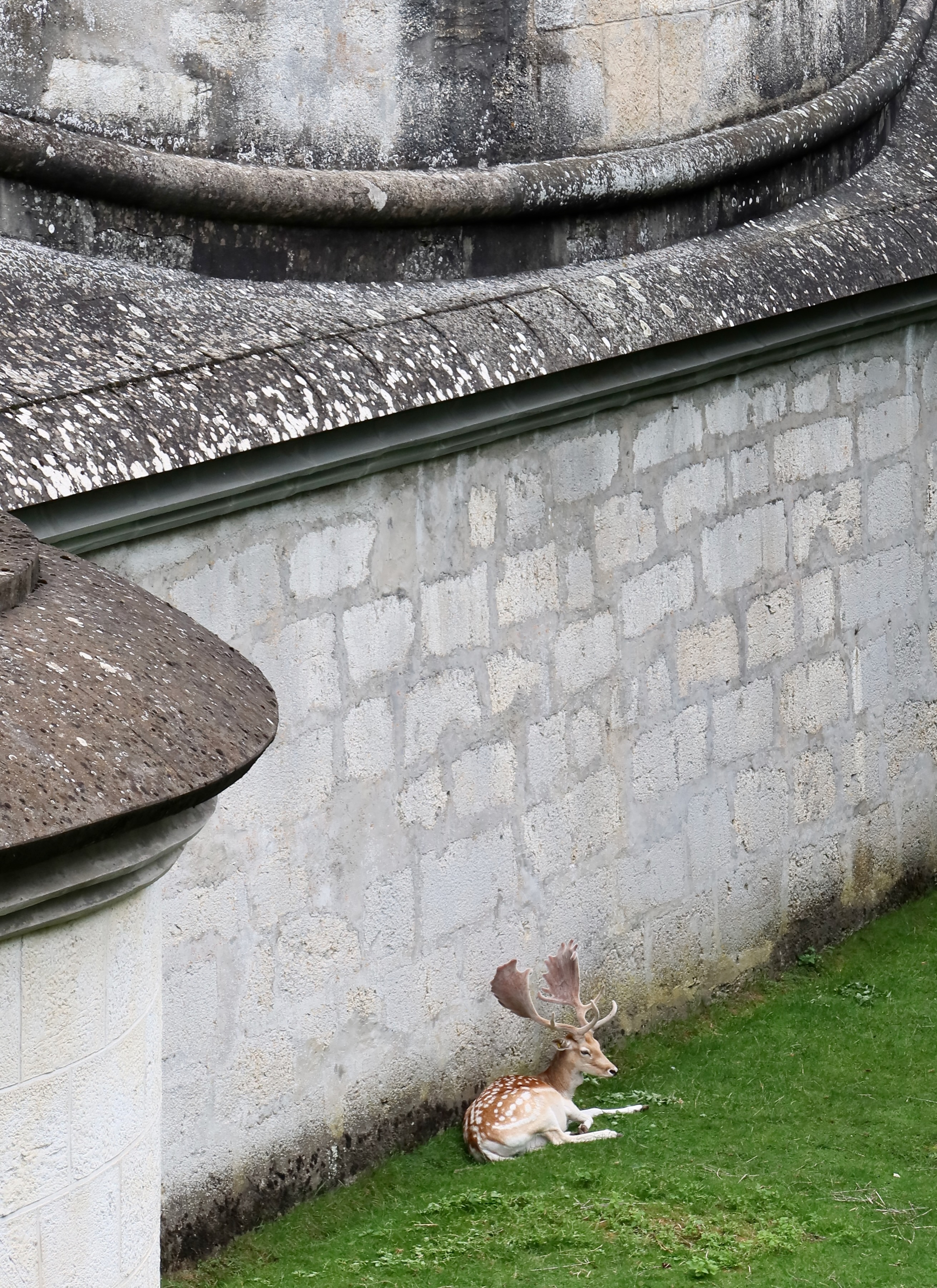
Fallow deer in the Munot moat

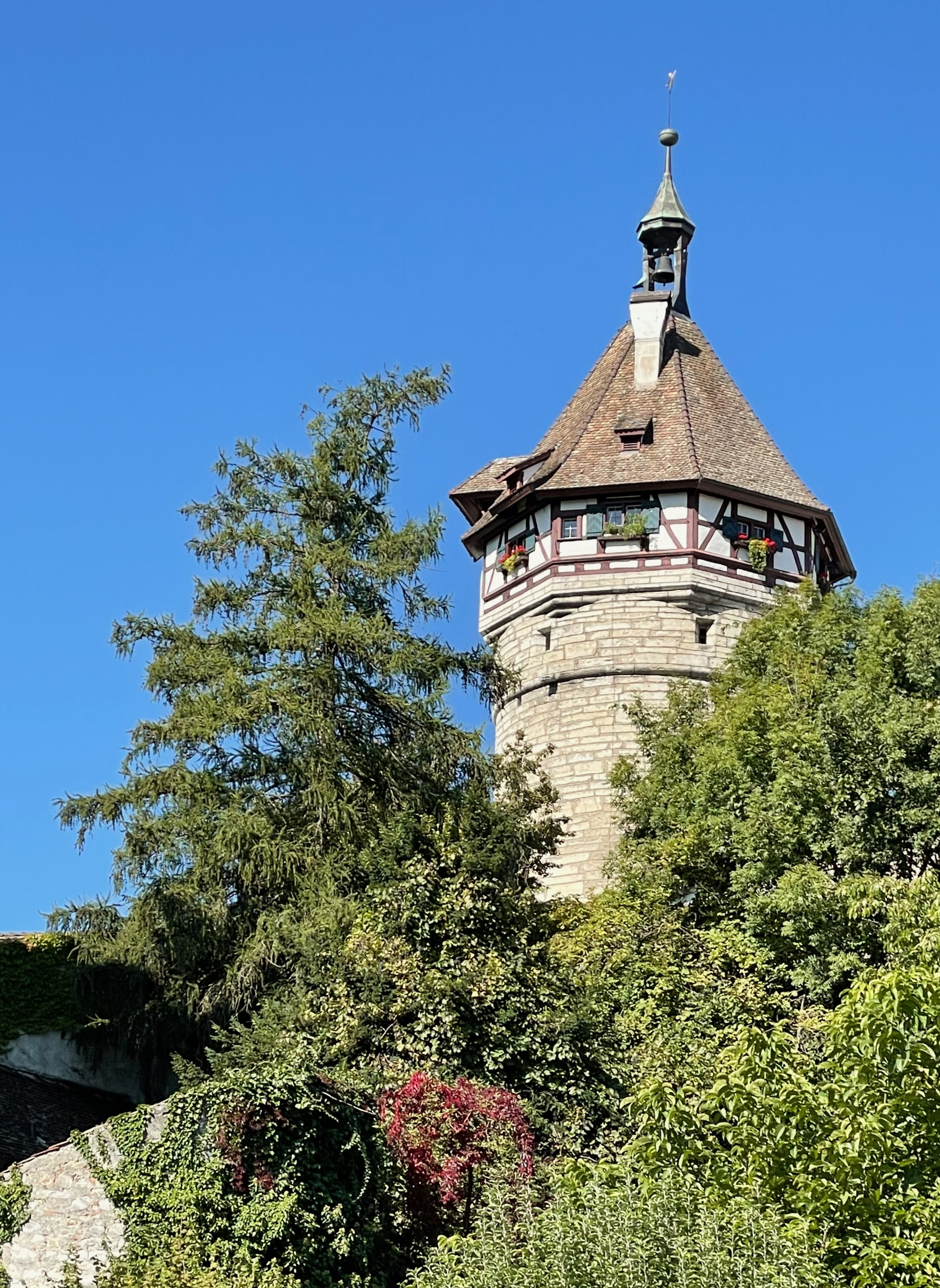
The Munot tower with its bell

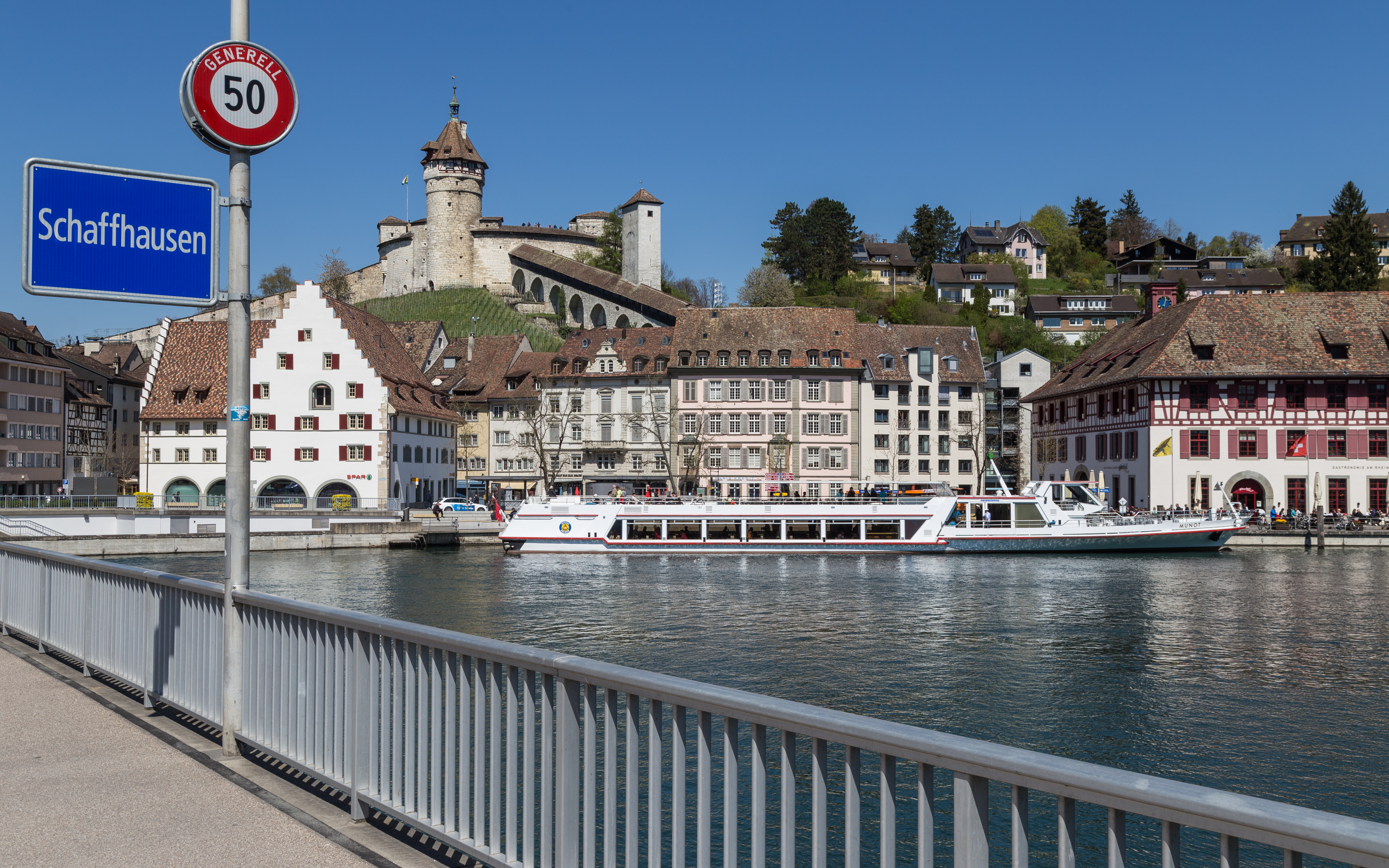
URh cruise ship at Schifflände

== See also ==
- Circular fort
- List of castles and fortresses in Switzerland
- Schaffhausen
