= Berlingen, Switzerland =

Berlingen
- Municipality
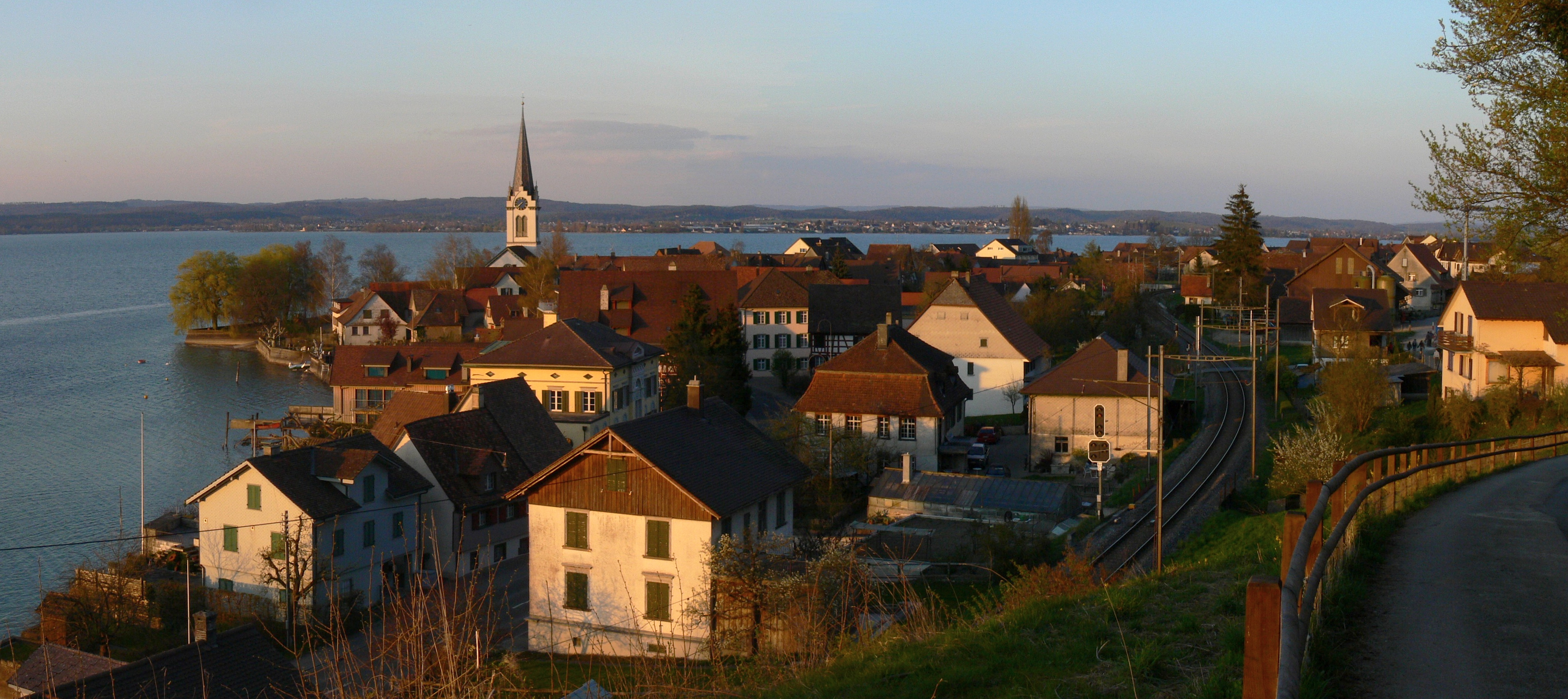

- Flag Coat of arms
- Location of Berlingen
- Location within Switzerland Location within Canton of Thurgau
- Coordinates: 47°40′N 9°1′E
- Country: Switzerland
- Canton: Thurgau
- District: Frauenfeld

Government
  - Mayor: Heinz Kasper

Area
  - Total: 3.56 km^{2} (1.37 sq mi)
- Elevation: 400 m (1,300 ft)

Population (November 2007)
  - Total: 812
  - Density: 228/km^{2} (591/sq mi)
- Time zone: UTC+01:00 (CET)
  - Summer (DST): UTC+02:00 (CEST)
- Postal code: 8267
- SFOS number: 4801
- ISO 3166 code: CH-TG
- Surrounded by: Gaienhofen (DE-BW), Raperswilen, Reichenau (DE-BW), Salenstein, Steckborn
- Website: www.berlingen.ch

Berlingen (Swiss Standard German pronunciation: [ˈbɛrlɪŋən]) is a municipality in Frauenfeld District in the canton of Thurgau in Switzerland.

It is located on the Untersee, the west tip of Lake Constance.

== History ==
Berlingen is first mentioned in 894 as Berenwanc. In 1267 it was mentioned as Bernanch and until the 18th century it was known as Bernang.

== Geography ==
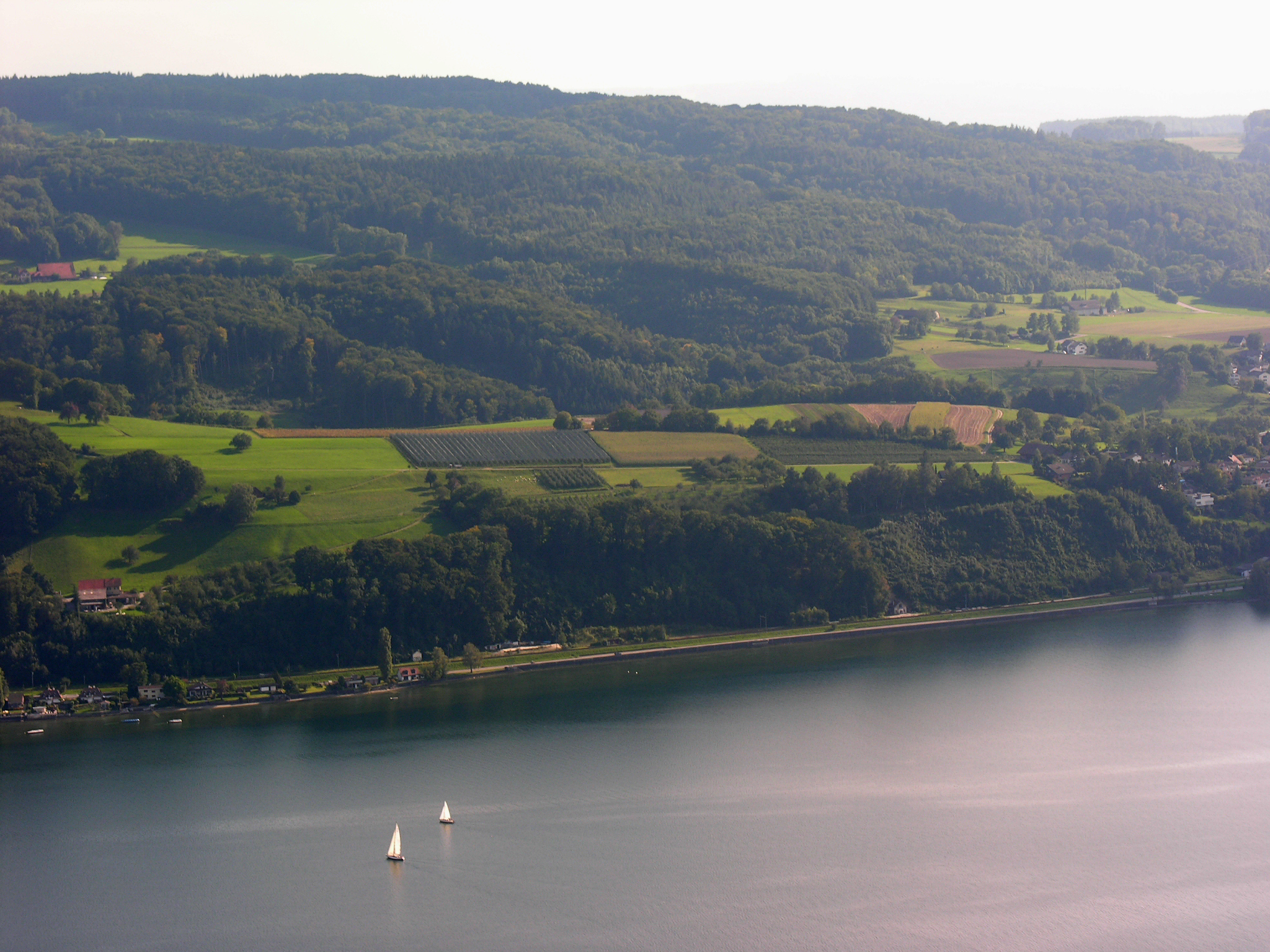
Fields outside Berlingen

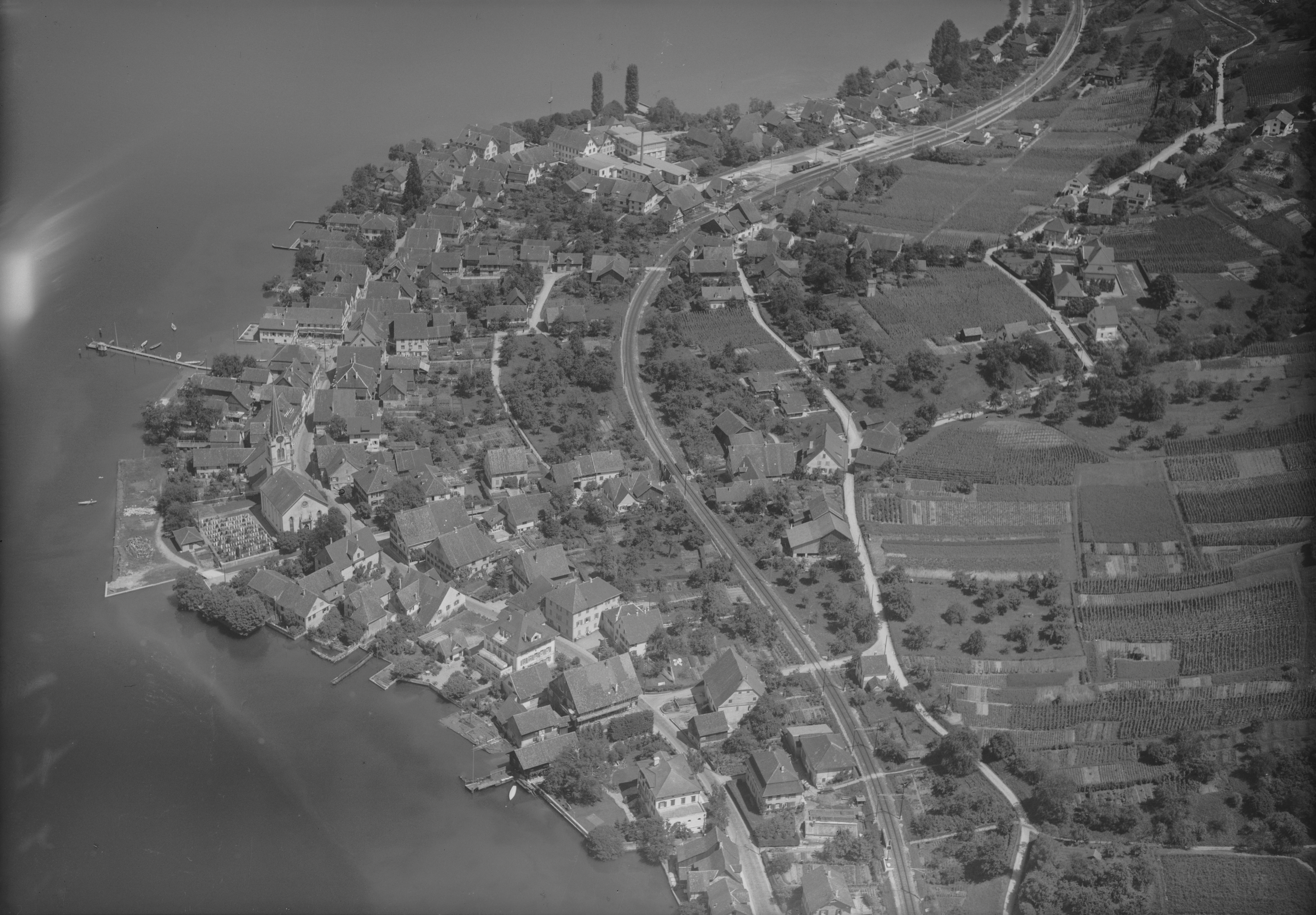
Aerial view (1948)

Berlingen has an area, as of 2009, of 3.56 square kilometers (1.37 sq mi). Of this area, 1.07 km^{2} (0.41 sq mi) or 30.1% is used for agricultural purposes, while 2.07 km^{2} (0.80 sq mi) or 58.1% is forested. Of the rest of the land, 0.4 km^{2} (0.15 sq mi) or 11.2% is settled (buildings or roads) and 0.01 km^{2} (2.5 acres) or 0.3% is unproductive land.

Of the built up area, industrial buildings made up 6.7% of the total area while housing and buildings made up 0.0% and transportation infrastructure made up 0.6%. while parks, green belts and sports fields made up 3.9%. Out of the forested land, 57.0% of the total land area is heavily forested and 1.1% is covered with orchards or small clusters of trees. Of the agricultural land, 24.7% is used for growing crops, while 5.3% is used for orchards or vine crops.

The municipality is located in Frauenfeld District, on a river delta in the Untersee region of Lake Constance. It consists of the village of Berlingen.

== Demographics ==
Berlingen has a population (as of December 2020) of 906 As of 2008, 21.2% of the population are foreign nationals. Over the last 10 years (1997–2007) the population has changed at a rate of 1.4%. Most of the population (as of 2000) speaks German(94.5%), with Italian being second most common ( 1.6%) and Albanian being third ( 0.8%).

As of 2008, the gender distribution of the population was 50.3% male and 49.7% female. The population was made up of 315 Swiss men (37.7% of the population), and 105 (12.6%) non-Swiss men. There were 343 Swiss women (41.1%), and 72 (8.6%) non-Swiss women. In 2008 there were 7 live births to Swiss citizens, and in same time span there were 9 deaths of Swiss citizens and 1 non-Swiss citizen death. Ignoring immigration and emigration, the population of Swiss citizens decreased by 2 while the foreign population decreased by 1. There was 1 Swiss man, 7 non-Swiss men and 3 non-Swiss women who emigrated from Switzerland to another country. The total Swiss population change in 2008 (from all sources) was an increase of 10 and the non-Swiss population change was an increase of 4 people. This represents a population growth rate of 1.7%.

The age distribution, as of 2009, in Berlingen is; 64 children or 7.6% of the population are between 0 and 9 years old and 64 teenagers or 7.6% are between 10 and 19. Of the adult population, 90 people or 10.7% of the population are between 20 and 29 years old. 91 people or 10.8% are between 30 and 39, 136 people or 16.2% are between 40 and 49, and 147 people or 17.5% are between 50 and 59. The senior population distribution is 134 people or 16.0% of the population are between 60 and 69 years old, 71 people or 8.5% are between 70 and 79, there are 36 people or 4.3% who are between 80 and 89, and there are 6 people or 0.7% who are 90 and older.

As of 2000, there were 344 private households (homes and apartments) in the municipality, and an average of 2.1 persons per household. In 2000 there were 211 single family homes (or 80.5% of the total) out of a total of 262 homes and apartments. There were 22 two family buildings (8.4%), 11 three family buildings (4.2%) and 18 multi-family buildings (or 6.9%). There were 231 (or 27.0%) persons who were part of a couple without children, and 319 (or 37.4%) who were part of a couple with children. There were 30 (or 3.5%) people who lived in single parent home, while there are 8 persons who were adult children living with one or both parents, 2 persons who lived in a household made up of relatives, 5 who lived in a household made up of unrelated persons, and 124 who are either institutionalized or live in another type of collective housing. The vacancy rate for the municipality, in 2008, was 1.19%. As of 2007, the construction rate of new housing units was 4.9 new units per 1000 residents.

In 2000 there were 486 houses and apartments in the municipality. The most common apartment size was the 3 room apartment of which there were 119. There were 16 one room apartments and 76 six or more rooms in the apartment. As of 2000 the average price to rent an average apartment in Berlingen was 1038.63 Swiss francs (CHF) per month (US$830, £470, €660 approx. exchange rate from 2003). The average rate for a one-room apartment was 530.83 CHF (US$420, £240, €340), a two-room apartment was about 664.52 CHF (US$530, £300, €430), a three-room apartment was about 938.02 CHF (US$750, £420, €600) and a six or more room apartment cost an average of 1674.17 CHF (US$1340, £750, €1070). The average apartment price in Berlingen was 93.1% of the national average of 1116 CHF.

In the 2007 federal election the most popular party was the SVP which received 38.81% of the vote. The next three most popular parties were the SP (15.66%), the FDP (15.55%) and the Green Party (11.27%). In the federal election, a total of 307 votes were cast, and the voter turnout was 54.1%.

The historical population is given in the following table:

year	population
1850	746
1900	706
1950	813
1980	880
1990	1,036
2000	854

== Sights ==
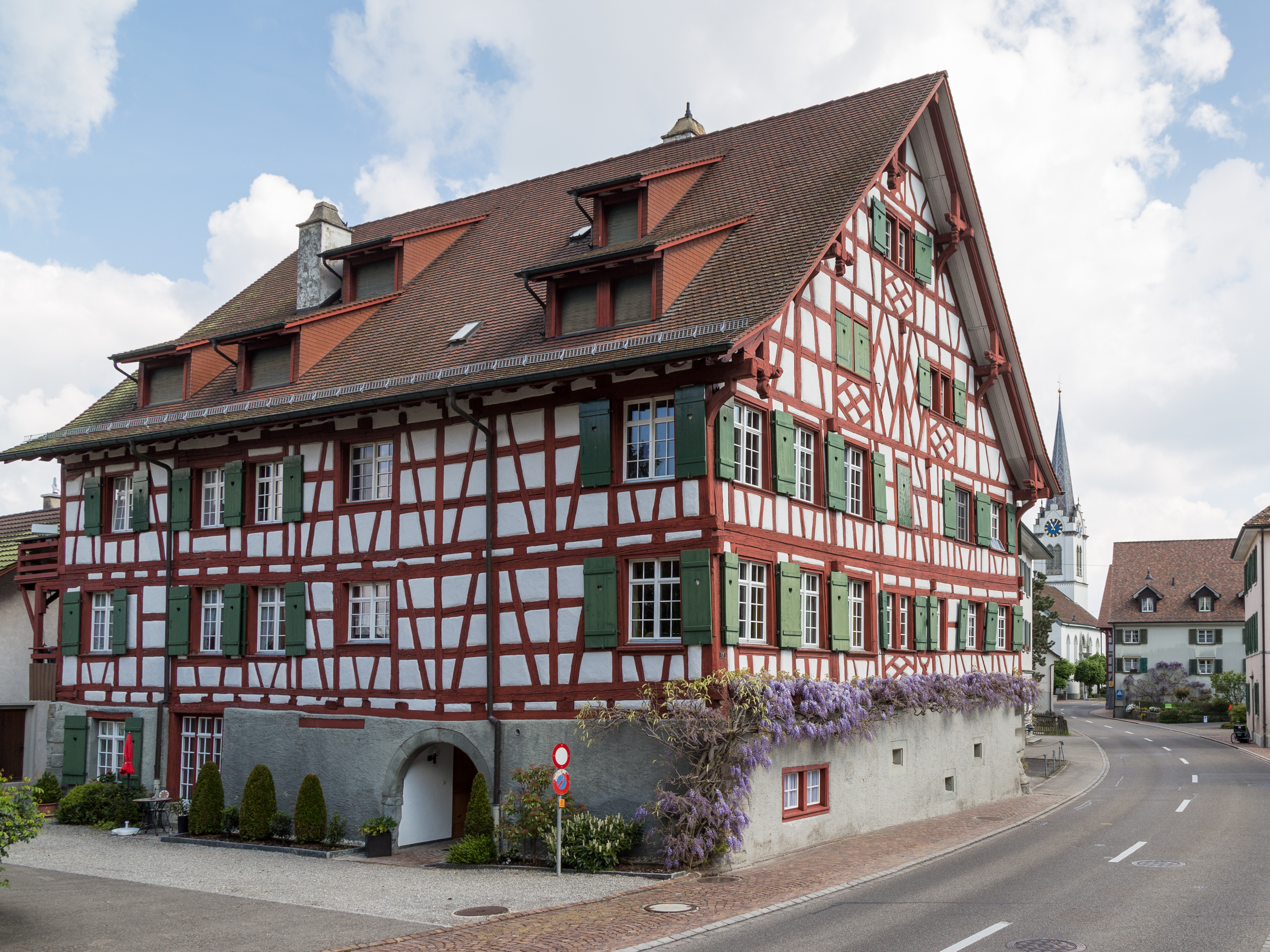
Kehlhof, build 1686

The entire village of Berlingen is designated as part of the Inventory of Swiss Heritage Sites.

== Economy ==
As of 2007, Berlingen had an unemployment rate of 1.35%. As of 2005, there were 23 people employed in the primary economic sector and about 9 businesses involved in this sector. 41 people are employed in the secondary sector and there are 11 businesses in this sector. 360 people are employed in the tertiary sector, with 41 businesses in this sector. In 2000 there were 502 workers who lived in the municipality. Of these, 218 or about 43.4% of the residents worked outside Berlingen while 226 people commuted into the municipality for work. There were a total of 510 jobs (of at least 6 hours per week) in the municipality. Of the working population, 7.6% used public transportation to get to work, and 42.2% used a private car.

== Religion ==
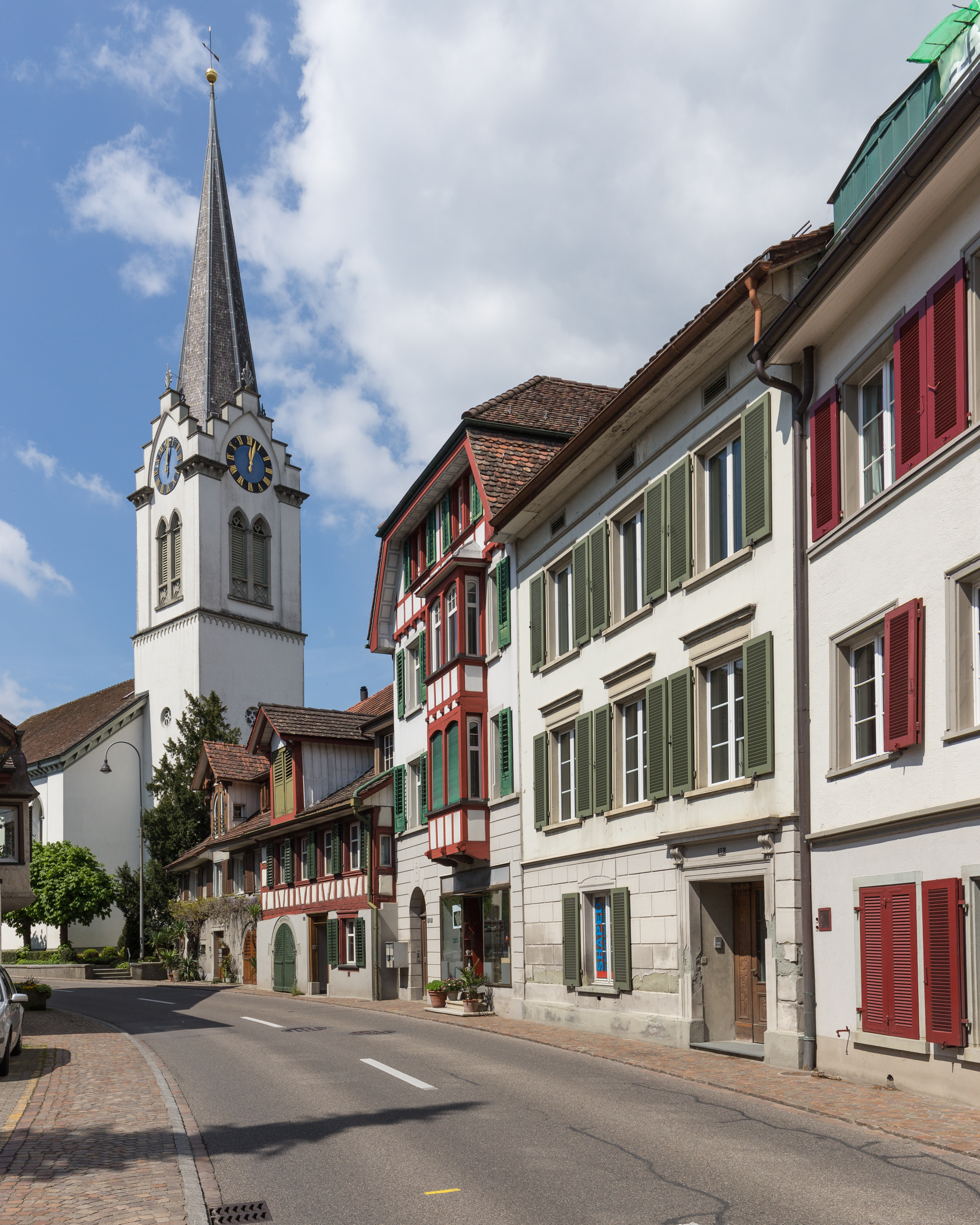
Lake street and Reformed Church

From the 2000 census, 224 or 26.2% were Roman Catholic, while 460 or 53.9% belonged to the Swiss Reformed Church. Of the rest of the population, there was 1 individual who belonged to the Christian Catholic faith there are 5 individuals (or about 0.59% of the population) who belong to the Orthodox Church, and there are 19 individuals (or about 2.22% of the population) who belong to another Christian church. There were 18 (or about 2.11% of the population) who are Islamic. There are 2 individuals (or about 0.23% of the population) who belong to another church (not listed on the census), 92 (or about 10.77% of the population) belong to no church, are agnostic or atheist, and 33 individuals (or about 3.86% of the population) did not answer the question.

== Transport ==
Berlingen sits on the Lake Line between Schaffhausen and Rorschach and is served by the St. Gallen S-Bahn at Berlingen railway station.

Berlingen has a landing stage. Between spring and autumn, the URh offers regular boat services on the High Rhine and Untersee between Schaffhausen and Kreuzlingen, via Konstanz.

== Education ==
The entire Swiss population is generally well educated. In Berlingen about 76.9% of the population (between age 25 and 64) have completed either non-mandatory upper secondary education or additional higher education (either university or a Fachhochschule).

Berlingen is home to the Berlingen combined municipal and primary school district. In the Berlingen District there are 34 students who are in kindergarten or the primary level. There are 10 children in the kindergarten, and the average class size is 10. Of the children in kindergarten, 5 or 50.0% are female, 1 or 10.0% are not Swiss citizens and 1 or 10.0% do not speak German natively. The lower and upper primary levels begin at about age 5-6 and last for 6 years. There are 19 children in who are at the lower primary level and 15 children in the mid and upper primary level. At the lower primary level, there are 8 children or 42.1% of the total population who are female, 4 or 21.1% are not Swiss citizens and 2 or 10.5% do not speak German natively. In the upper primary level, there are 6 or 40.0% who are female, 4 or 26.7% are not Swiss citizens and 2 or 13.3% do not speak German natively.
