= Mannenbach-Salenstein railway station =

Railway station in Salenstein, Switzerland

Mannenbach-Salenstein
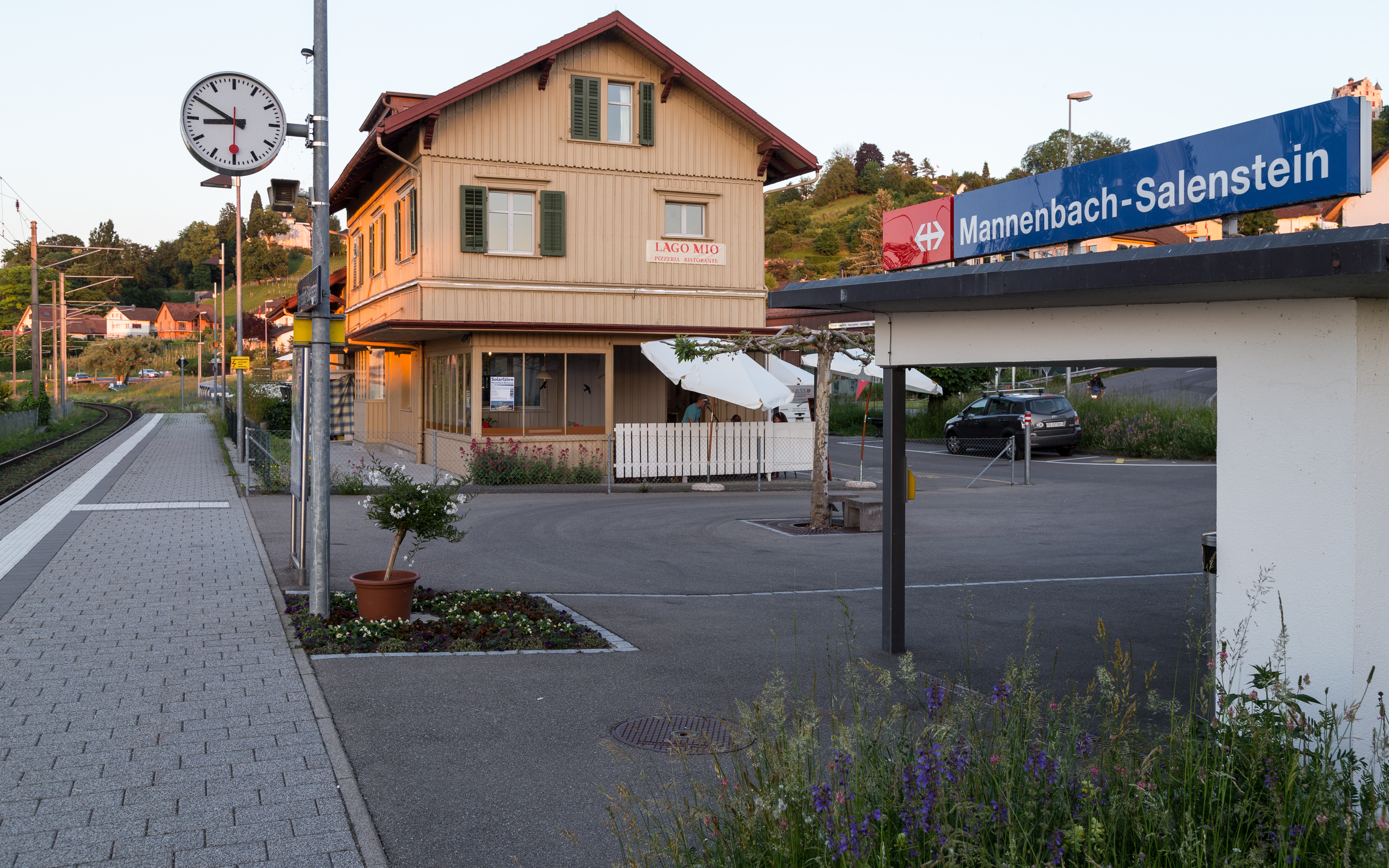
- The platform and shelter in 2017; the original station building is now a restaurant

General information
- Location: Salenstein; Switzerland
- Coordinates: 47°40′2″N 9°3′31″E
- Elevation: 400 m (1,300 ft)
- Owner: Swiss Federal Railways
- Line: Lake line
- Train operators: Thurbo
- Connections
- Ship: URh passenger ships

Other information
- Fare zone: 954 (Tarifverbund Ostschweiz)

Services
Preceding station	St. Gallen S-Bahn	Following station
Berlingen towards Schaffhausen	S1	Ermatingen towards Wil
Location
- Location within Switzerland Location within Canton of Thurgau

Mannenbach-Salenstein railway station (German: Bahnhof Mannenbach-Salenstein) is a railway station in Salenstein, in the Swiss canton of Thurgau. It is an intermediate stop on the Lake line and is served by local trains only.

The station is close to the southern shore of the Untersee (Lake Constance).

== Services ==
Mannenbach-Salenstein is served by the S1 of the St. Gallen S-Bahn, as a request stop:

- S1: half-hourly service between Schaffhausen and Wil via St. Gallen.

A nearby landing stage, ca. 400 m (1,300 ft) to the west, is served by passenger boats of Schweizerische Schifffahrtsgesellschaft Untersee und Rhein (URh), which operate between Schaffhausen and Kreuzlingen.

== See also ==
- Rail transport in Switzerland
