= Arenenberg =

Estate and chateau in Switzerland

Coordinates: 47°40′22″N 9°03′33″E

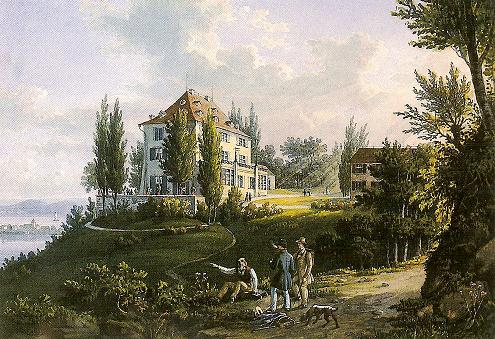
Arenenberg about 1840 (by Labhardt)

Arenenberg is an estate with a small chateau, Schloss Arenenberg, in the municipality of Salenstein at the shore of Lake Constance in Thurgau, Switzerland that is famous as the final domicile of Hortense de Beauharnais. Today it houses the Napoleonmuseum. It is a Swiss heritage site of national significance.

== History ==
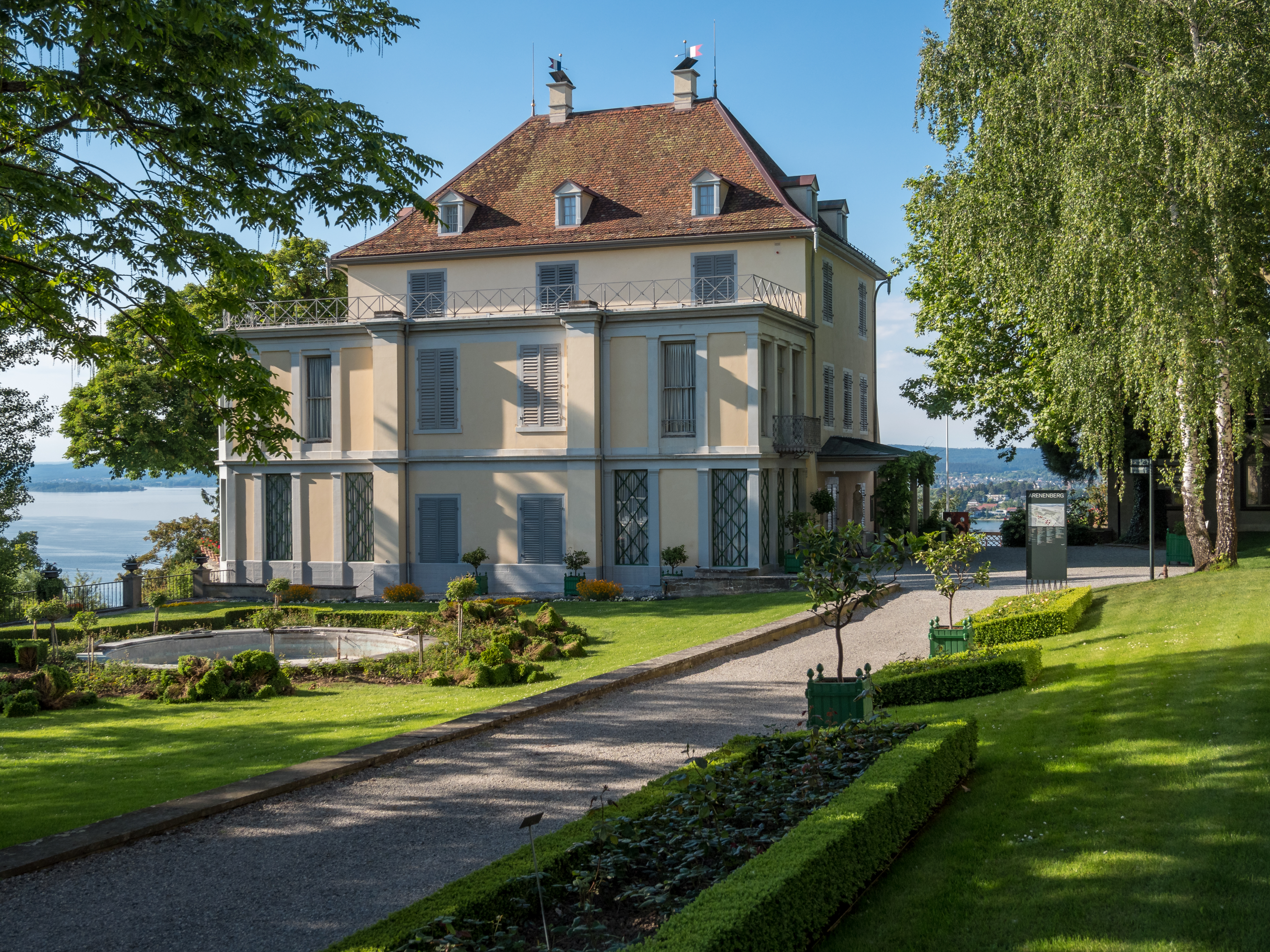
Arenenberg castle

Arenenberg was built in the early 16th century by the mayor of Constance (1546–48) Sebastian Geissberg. The name of the farm that had been located there before was Narrenberg ("fools' mountain"), perhaps not a suitable name to hold on to, but also the hill towards the lake was named "Arnhalde". By the 19th century the current name was used.

The estate saw a number of owners. In 1817, Johann Baptist von Streng sold it to the exiled Hortense de Beauharnais, the daughter of ex-Empress Joséphine, for 30,000 guilders. As arranged by Napoleon, Hortense had to marry his brother Louis Bonaparte, and the couple were named King and Queen of Holland (1806–10). The royal couple not only suffered with the demise of the rule of Napoleon, but also had an unhappy marriage leading to a separation. Hortense initiated reconstructions and renovations in an attempt to recreate the atmosphere of Malmaison. The surrounding park was possibly designed by Louis-Martin Berthault. In 1818 she moved in. Her brother, Eugène de Beauharnais, bought the nearby Schloss Sandegg and built a villa close by.

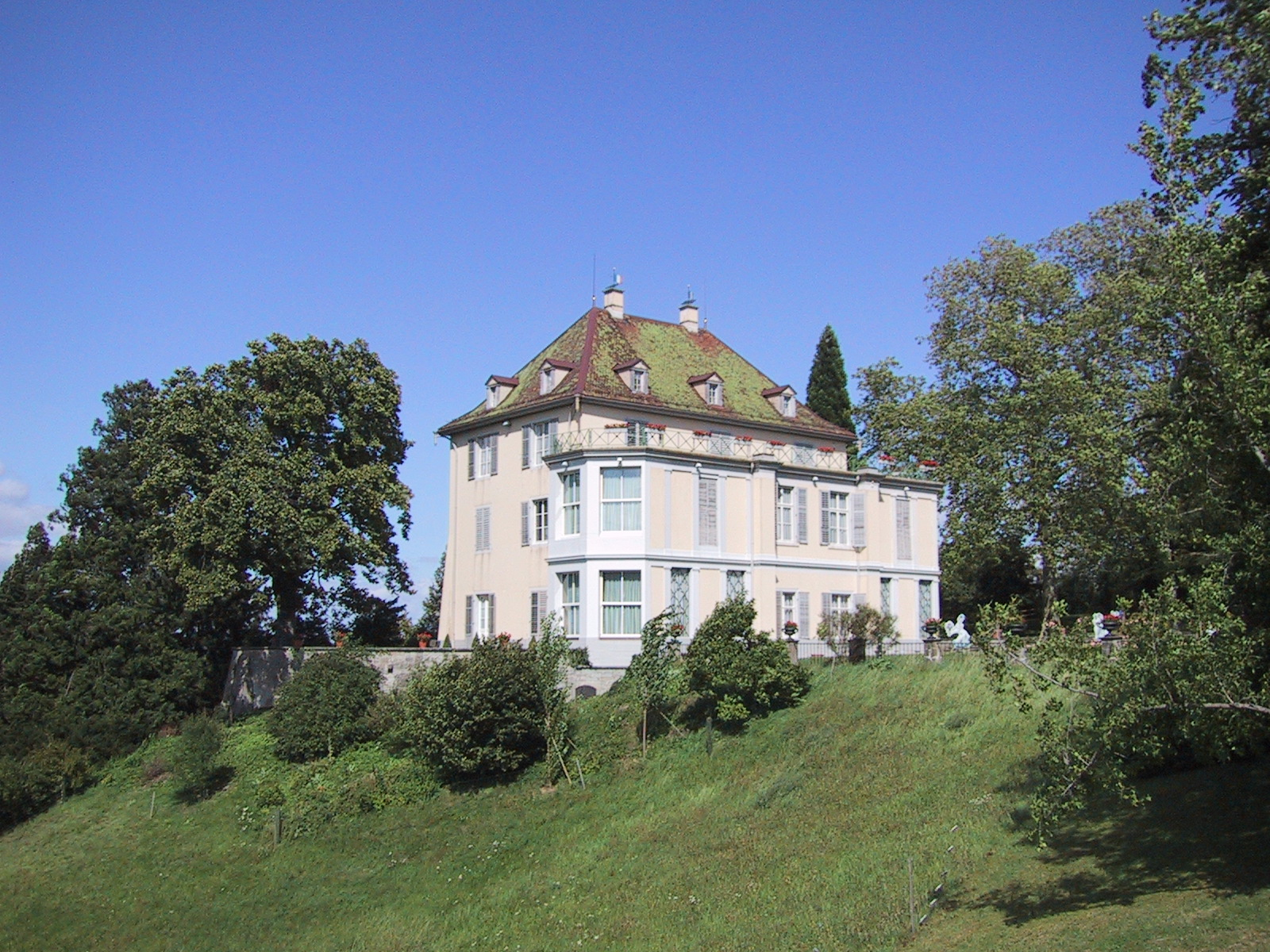
Arenenberg

While Hortense initially spent time at her house in Augsburg, Arenenberg soon became her main domicile. At her Parisian-styled salon she entertained many luminaries. Her son Louis Napoléon, the future emperor Napoléon III, who had attended school in Augsburg, visited Arenenberg as a teenager; there he was further educated and then attended the Swiss military academy at Thun, receiving Swiss citizenship. In 1837, while he was exiled and living in New York City, Louis Napoleon received notice of his mother's deteriorating health and returned to Arenenberg. Hortense died on 5 October 1837. After mourning, Louis Napoleon had to leave Switzerland, due to French pressure, and moved to London. In 1843, in need of money to finance his aspirations, he sold the property to Heinrich Keller. Once he was emperor, his empress Eugénie bought it back in 1855. Further renovations were made between 1855 and 1874.

After Napoleon III's death, Eugénie visited Arenenberg several times before she donated it in 1906 to the Canton Thurgau. Today the château is home to the Napoleon Museum. The Napoleon Park is being restored.

== See also ==
- List of castles and fortresses in Switzerland
- List of museums in Switzerland

== Literature ==
- Johannes Meyer, Die früheren Besitzer von Arenenberg. Frauenfeld 1920
- Jakob Hugentobler, Die Familie Bonaparte auf Arenenberg. Salenstein 1989
- Dominik Gügel and Christina Egli: Arkadien am Bodensee. Europäische Gartenkultur des beginnenden 19. Jahrhunderts. Frauenfeld 2005.
