= Münsterlingen =

- Municipality
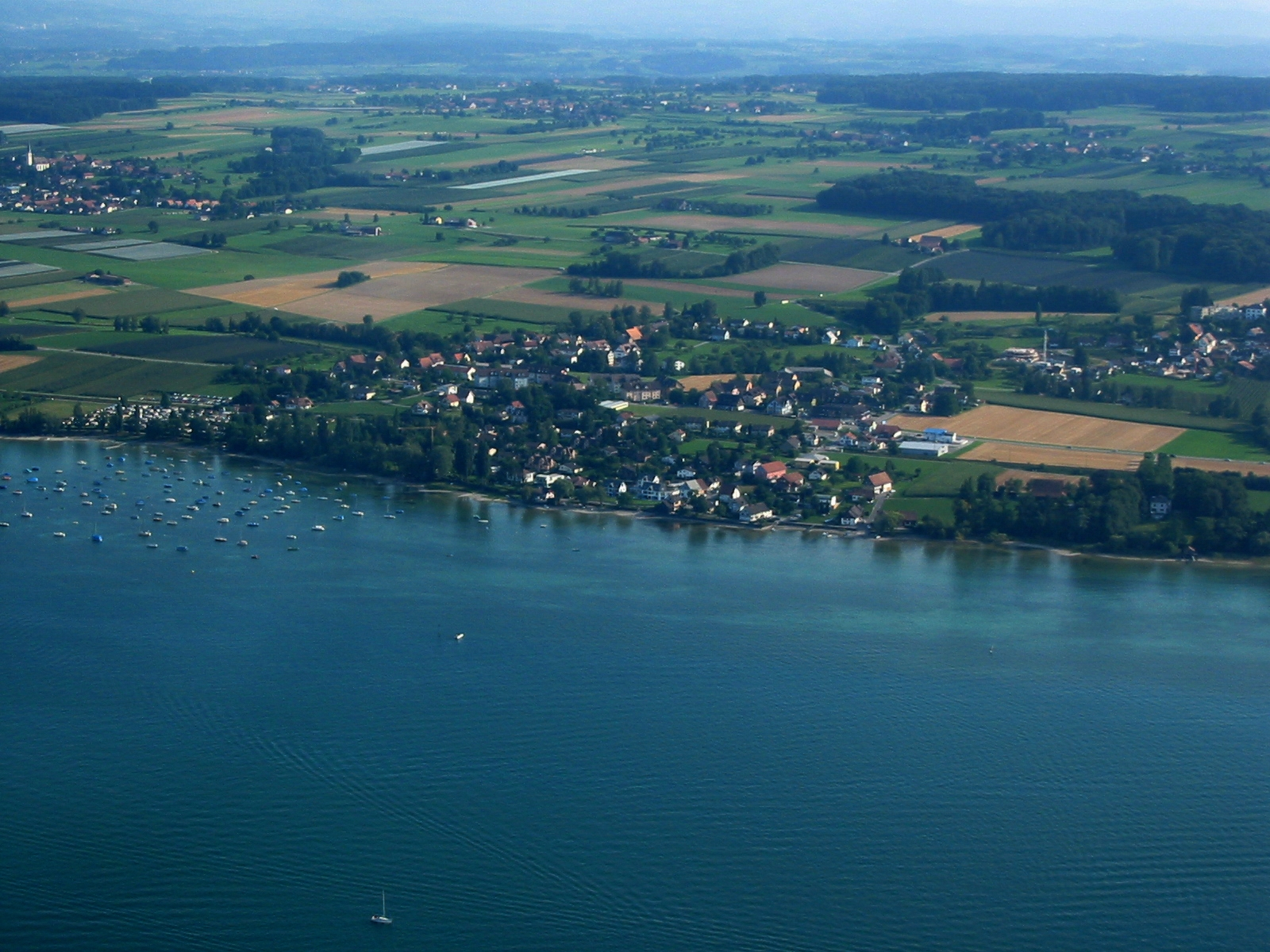

- Coat of arms
- Location of Münsterlingen
- Location within Switzerland Location within Canton of Thurgau
- Coordinates: 47°38′N 9°14′E
- Country: Switzerland
- Canton: Thurgau
- District: Kreuzlingen

Area
  - Total: 5.4 km^{2} (2.1 sq mi)
- Elevation: 405 m (1,329 ft)

Population (December 2007)
  - Total: 2,543
  - Density: 470/km^{2} (1,200/sq mi)
- Time zone: UTC+01:00 (CET)
  - Summer (DST): UTC+02:00 (CEST)
- Postal code: 8596, 8597
- SFOS number: 4691
- ISO 3166 code: CH-TG
- Surrounded by: Altnau, Bottighofen, Constance (Konstanz) (DE-BW), Güttingen, Hagnau am Bodensee (DE-BW), Langrickenbach, Lengwil, Meersburg (DE-BW), Stetten (DE-BW)
- Website: www.muensterlingen.ch

Münsterlingen is a municipality in the district of Kreuzlingen in the canton of Thurgau in Switzerland.

== History ==
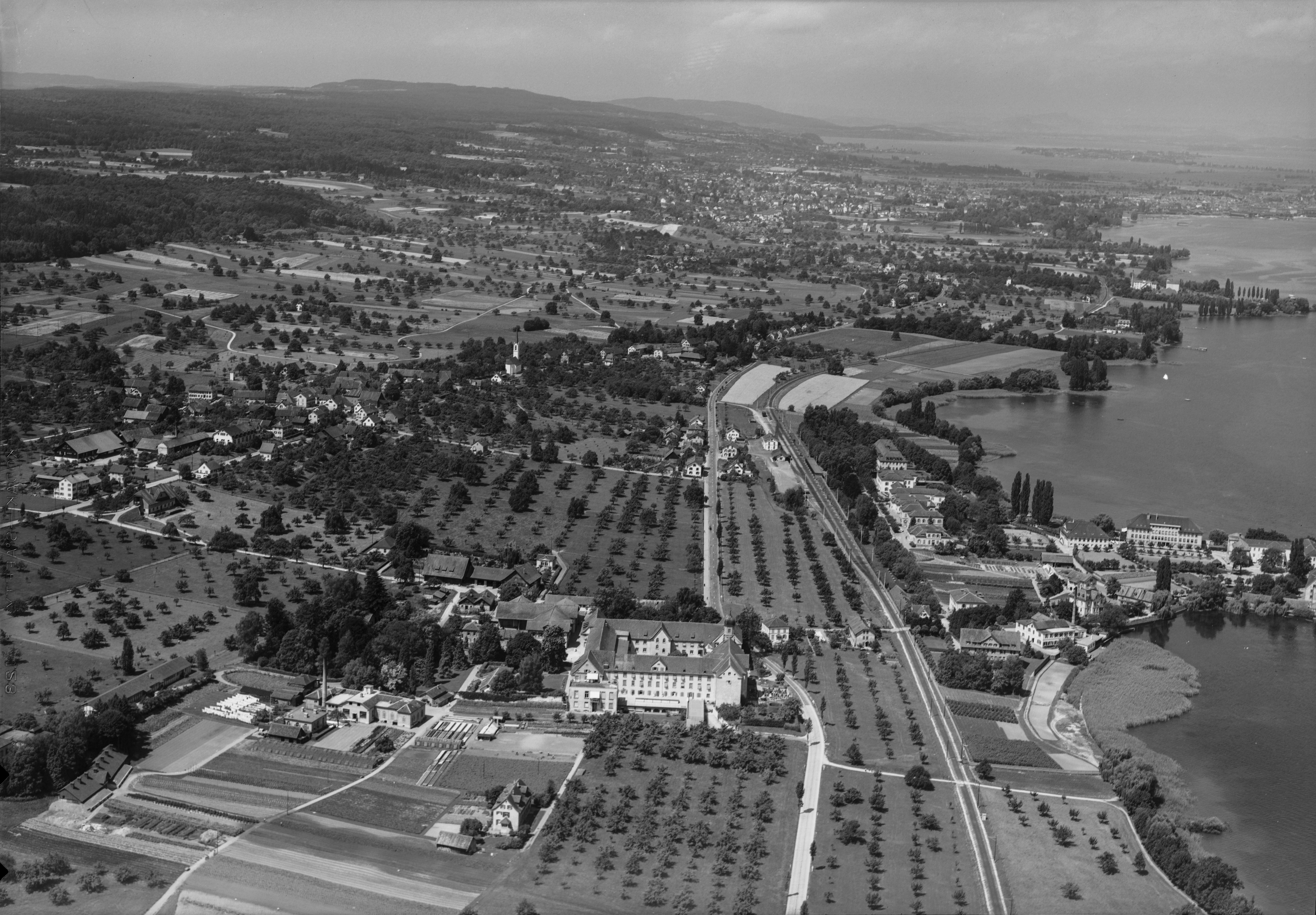
Aerial view (1954)

In 1994 the municipality was created from Landschlacht and Scherzingen. Münsterlingen is first mentioned in 1125 as Munsterlin. Scherzingen is first mentioned in 1150 as Scherzingen and Landschlacht is first mentioned in 817 as Lanchasalachi.

Neolithic and Bronze Age stilt houses were discovered in Scherzingen along with numerous neolithic artifacts in Landschlacht.

During the Middle Ages Scherzingen was owned by the Bishop of Constance and, until 1798, was part of the bailiwick of Eggen. In 1280, the monastery of Münsterlingen acquired the right to tithes in Scherzingen, from Constance. The parish of Münsterlingen, which included Scherzingen, Bottighofen, Rickenbach (until 1709) and Oberhofen (after 1712), had a long association with the monastery but converted quickly to the Reformation.

Landschlacht was also owned by the Bishop of Constance, but during the High Middle Ages, the bailiff was the Baron of Güttingen. In 1413 a half share of the low court was sold to Hans Duerrmüller and ten secondary investors from Landschlacht. The other half went to Petershausen monastery in 1452 and in 1486 to Münsterlingen Abbey. In 1621 the eleven investors families sold their share of the court to Münsterlingen, where it remained until 1798. Landschlacht was always part of the parish of Altnau. The chapel of St. Leonhard was built before 1000 and is decorated with Gothic frescoes.

== Geography ==
Münsterlingen has an area, as of 2009, of 5.42 square kilometers (2.09 sq mi). Of this area, 3.09 km^{2} (1.19 sq mi) or 57.0% is used for agricultural purposes, while 1.09 km^{2} (0.42 sq mi) or 20.1% is forested. Of the rest of the land, 1.18 km^{2} (0.46 sq mi) or 21.8% is settled (buildings or roads), 0.02 km^{2} (4.9 acres) or 0.4% is either rivers or lakes and 0.02 km^{2} (4.9 acres) or 0.4% is unproductive land.

Of the built up area, industrial buildings made up 12.5% of the total area while housing and buildings made up 1.3% and transportation infrastructure made up 0.9%. Power and water infrastructure as well as other special developed areas made up 3.0% of the area while parks, green belts and sports fields made up 4.1%. Out of the forested land, 18.3% of the total land area is heavily forested and 1.8% is covered with orchards or small clusters of trees. Of the agricultural land, 45.8% is used for growing crops, while 11.3% is used for orchards or vine crops. Of the water in the municipality, 0.2% is in lakes and 0.2% is in rivers and streams.

The municipality is located in the Kreuzlingen district, south-east of Kreuzlingen and is part of the Kreuzlingen and Constance agglomeration. It consists of the former Ortsgemeinden of Scherzingen and Landschlacht and the former monastery of Münsterlingen.

== Demographics ==
Münsterlingen has a population (as of December 2020) of 3,512. As of 2008, 33.4% of the population are foreign nationals. Over the last 10 years (1997–2007) the population has changed at a rate of 12.2%. Most of the population (as of 2000) speaks German (88.6%), with Serbo-Croatian being second most common ( 3.2%) and Albanian being third ( 2.6%).

As of 2008, the gender distribution of the population was 50.2% male and 49.8% female. The population was made up of 857 Swiss men (32.4% of the population), and 474 (17.9%) non-Swiss men. There were 906 Swiss women (34.2%), and 412 (15.6%) non-Swiss women.

In 2008 there were 10 live births to Swiss citizens and 6 births to non-Swiss citizens, and in same time span there were 9 deaths of Swiss citizens and 4 non-Swiss citizen deaths. Ignoring immigration and emigration, the population of Swiss citizens increased by 1 while the foreign population increased by 2. There was 1 Swiss man, 48 non-Swiss men who emigrated from Switzerland to another country and 40 non-Swiss women who emigrated from Switzerland to another country. The total Swiss population change in 2008 (from all sources) was an increase of 1 and the non-Swiss population change was an increase of 87 people. This represents a population growth rate of 3.4%.

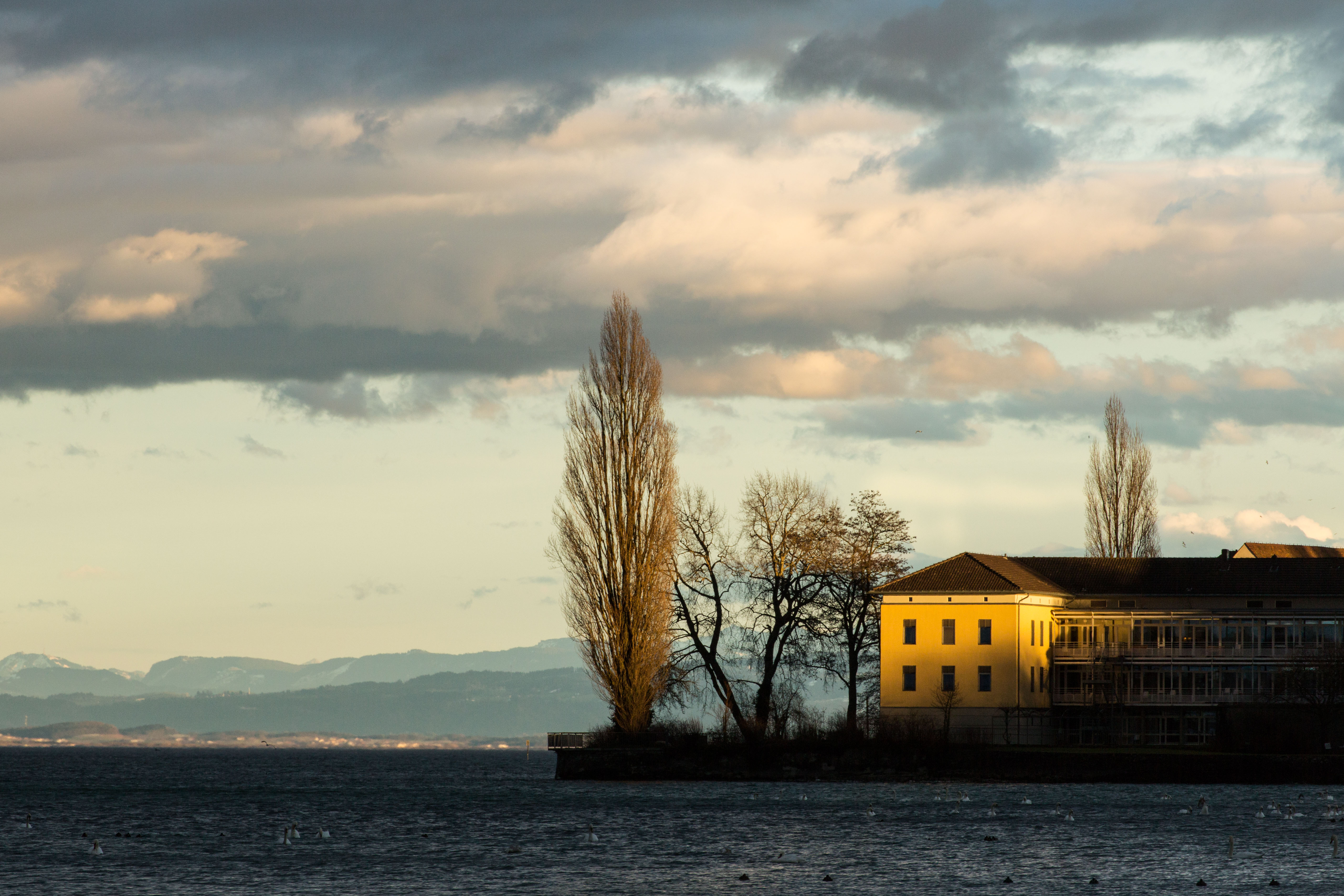
Psychiatrische Klinik Münsterlingen

The age distribution, as of 2009, in Münsterlingen is; 271 children or 9.8% of the population are between 0 and 9 years old and 312 teenagers or 11.3% are between 10 and 19. Of the adult population, 347 people or 12.5% of the population are between 20 and 29 years old. 351 people or 12.7% are between 30 and 39, 515 people or 18.6% are between 40 and 49, and 403 people or 14.6% are between 50 and 59. The senior population distribution is 295 people or 10.7% of the population are between 60 and 69 years old, 185 people or 6.7% are between 70 and 79, there are 80 people or 2.9% who are between 80 and 89, and there are 9 people or 0.3% who are 90 and older.

As of 2000, there were 1,000 private households in the municipality, and an average of 2.4 persons per household. In 2000 there were 384 single family homes (or 77.7% of the total) out of a total of 494 inhabited buildings. There were 32 two family buildings (6.5%), 10 three family buildings (2.0%) and 68 multi-family buildings (or 13.8%). There were 511 (or 19.7%) persons who were part of a couple without children, and 1,305 (or 50.2%) who were part of a couple with children. There were 151 (or 5.8%) people who lived in single parent home, while there are 12 persons who were adult children living with one or both parents, 3 persons who lived in a household made up of relatives, 21 who lived in a household made up of unrelated persons, and 247 who are either institutionalized or live in another type of collective housing.

The vacancy rate for the municipality, in 2008, was 4.59%. As of 2007, the construction rate of new housing units was 16.8 new units per 1000 residents. In 2000 there were 1,315 apartments in the municipality. The most common apartment size was the 1 room apartment of which there were 271. There were 271 single room apartments and 161 apartments with six or more rooms. As of 2000 the average price to rent an average apartment in Münsterlingen was 978.95 Swiss francs (CHF) per month (US$780, £440, €630 approx. exchange rate from 2000). The average rate for a one-room apartment was 388.90 CHF (US$310, £180, €250), a two-room apartment was about 791.40 CHF (US$630, £360, €510), a three-room apartment was about 877.01 CHF (US$700, £390, €560) and a six or more room apartment cost an average of 1548.85 CHF (US$1240, £700, €990). The average apartment price in Münsterlingen was 87.7% of the national average of 1116 CHF.

In the 2007 federal election the most popular party was the SVP which received 35.88% of the vote. The next three most popular parties were the Green Party (17.86%), the SP (12.76%) and the CVP (12.74%). In the federal election, a total of 713 votes were cast, and the voter turnout was 49.7%.

The historical population is given in the following table:

Year	Population Scherzingen Ortsgemeinde only	Population Landschlacht
1850	285	-
1900	705	473
1950	1,228	585
1990	1,470	1,026
Year	Population, Münsterlingen	
2000	2,599	

== Heritage sites of national significance ==
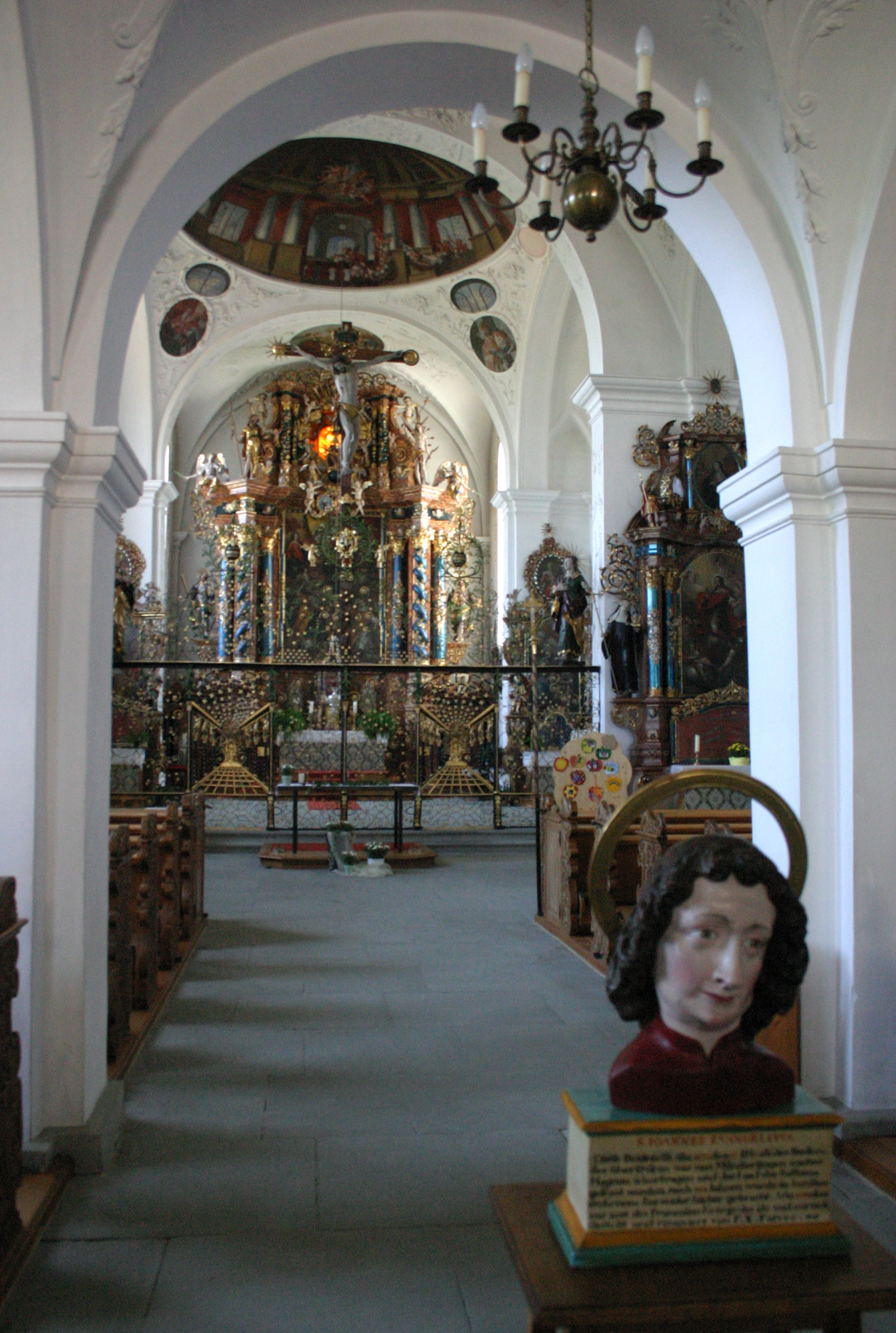
Benedictine Monastery with the bust of St. John that is carried over the frozen lake

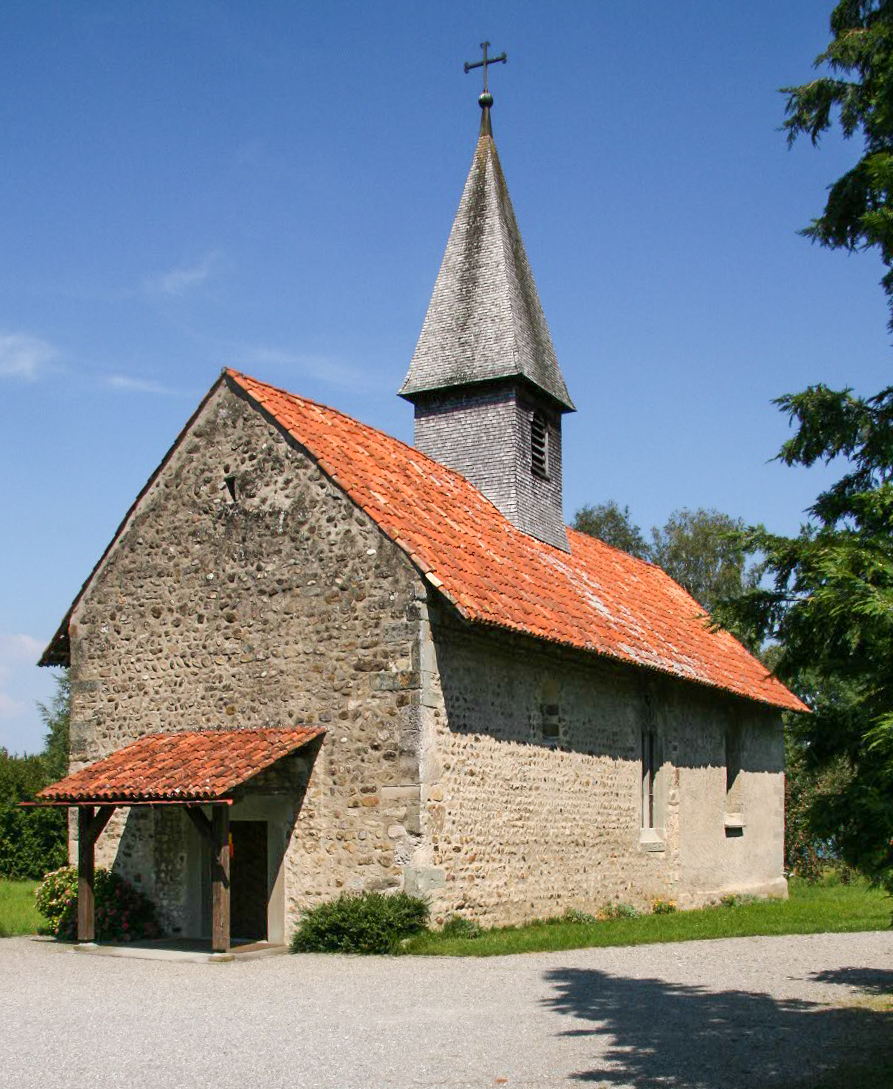
Chapel of St. Leonhard

The former Benedictine Monastery and the Chapel of St. Leonhard are listed as Swiss heritage site of national significance. The entire village of Münsterlingen is part of the Inventory of Swiss Heritage Sites.

== Economy ==
As of 2007, Münsterlingen had an unemployment rate of 2.35%. As of 2005, there were 45 people employed in the primary economic sector and about 14 businesses involved in this sector. 16 people are employed in the secondary sector and there are 9 businesses in this sector. 1,936 people are employed in the tertiary sector, with 63 businesses in this sector.

In 2000 there were 1,729 workers who lived in the municipality. Of these, 781 or about 45.2% of the residents worked outside Münsterlingen while 1,495 people commuted into the municipality for work. There were a total of 2,443 jobs (of at least 6 hours per week) in the municipality. Of the working population, 8.6% used public transportation to get to work, and 48.3% used a private car.

== Religion ==
From the 2000 census, 877 or 33.7% were Roman Catholic, while 1,014 or 39.0% belonged to the Swiss Reformed Church. Of the rest of the population, there was 1 Old Catholic who belonged to the Christian Catholic Church of Switzerland there are 109 individuals (or about 4.19% of the population) who belong to the Orthodox Church, and there are 66 individuals (or about 2.54% of the population) who belong to another Christian church. There were 154 (or about 5.93% of the population) who are Islamic. There are 21 individuals (or about 0.81% of the population) who belong to another church (not listed on the census), 229 (or about 8.81% of the population) belong to no church, are agnostic or atheist, and 128 individuals (or about 4.92% of the population) did not answer the question.

== Transport ==
Münsterlingen sits on the Lake Line between Schaffhausen and Rorschach and is served by the St. Gallen S-Bahn at three stations: Münsterlingen-Scherzingen, Münsterlingen Spital, and Landschlacht.

== Education ==
In Münsterlingen about 68.9% of the population (between age 25-64) have completed either non-mandatory upper secondary education or additional higher education (either university or a Fachhochschule).

Münsterlingen is home to the Münsterlingen primary school district. In the 2008/2009 school year there were 219 students. There were 42 children in the kindergarten, and the average class size was 14 kindergartners. Of the children in kindergarten, 21 or 50.0% were female, 12 or 28.6% were not Swiss citizens and 13 or 31.0% did not speak German natively. The lower and upper primary levels begin at about age 5-6 and last for 6 years. There were 91 children in who were at the lower primary level and 86 children in the upper primary level. The average class size in the primary school was 22.13 students. At the lower primary level, there were 44 children or 48.4% of the total population who were female, 27 or 29.7% were not Swiss citizens and 25 or 27.5% did not speak German natively. In the upper primary level, there were 35 or 40.7% who were female, 21 or 24.4% were not Swiss citizens and 17 or 19.8% did not speak German natively.
