= Hans Sellschopp =

Hans Karl Wilhelm Max Heinrich Sellschopp (16 April 1891, in Schwerin – 5 August 1978 in Bottighofen) was a German businessman and Nazi cultural officer at the Reichsmusikkammer, who worked as a concert promoter at Coventry Cathedral after World War II. He was later made Grand Commander of the Order of the Crown of Italy.
