= Dettighofen =

Dettighofen may refer to:

- Dettighofen, Switzerland
- Dettighofen, Baden-Württemberg, Germany
