= Lengwil =

- Municipality
- Coat of arms
- Location of Lengwil
- Location within Switzerland Location within Canton of Thurgau
- Coordinates: 47°37′N 9°11′E
- Country: Switzerland
- Canton: Thurgau
- District: Kreuzlingen

Area
  - Total: 8.89 km^{2} (3.43 sq mi)
- Elevation: 470 m (1,540 ft)

Population (December 2007)
  - Total: 1,252
  - Density: 141/km^{2} (365/sq mi)
- Time zone: UTC+01:00 (CET)
  - Summer (DST): UTC+02:00 (CEST)
- Postal code: 8574
- SFOS number: 4683
- ISO 3166 code: CH-TG
- Localities: Ast, Dettighofen, Eigen, Ekkharthof, Emmerzholz, Illighausen, Liebburg, Oberhofen bei Kreuzlingen
- Surrounded by: Berg, Birwinken, Bottighofen, Kemmental, Kreuzlingen, Langrickenbach, Münsterlingen
- Website: www.lengwil.ch

Lengwil is a municipality in the district of Kreuzlingen in the canton of Thurgau in Switzerland.

== History ==
The municipality was created in 1998 by a merger of the Ortsgemeinde of Illighausen and the village of Oberhofen bei Kreuzlingen. During the merger, the village of Schönenbaumgarten (which had been part of Illighausen) went to the municipality of Langrickenbach. Lengwil village is first mentioned in 1159 as Leingewillare. Illighausen is first mentioned in 1176 as Illinchusen and Oberhofen bei Kreuzlingen is mentioned in 1160 as Obirhovin.

Illighausen was originally owned by the Bishop of Constance and from the Middle Ages until 1798 was part of the Bishop's bailiwick of Eggen. It became part of the parish of Münsterlingen in 1312–13 at which time, it already had a village church. With the Protestant Reformation most of the village converted to the new faith and became a separate parish. However, in the 16th century, the village became part of the Reformed parish of Altnau, and the village church became a filial church of Altnau. Since 1942, Illighausen has been part of the parish of Oberhofen. The local economy revolved around agriculture until the 19th century when dairy farming was added. In 1900 the embroidery entered the village. However, limited road access to the village as prevented any industries from settling in Illighausen.

Oberhofen is first mentioned in 1160, but was settled earlier, as several Early Middle Ages graves indicate. Dettighofen, Lengwil and Oberhofen formed a lower court for the Herrschaft of Liebburg. The Herrschaft was owned in 1376 by Ulrich von Koenigsegg, in 1452 by Ulrich Blarer, between 1526 and 1628 by Meldegg Reichlin of Ulm and between 1685 and 1745 by the Bishop of Constance. In 1745 it was finally acquired by the Ratzenried family. The village chapel was first mentioned in 1477 and was a curacy of the Monastery of St. Stephen in Constance. In 1528 the Protestant Reformation was introduced in 1528. In the 16th century the chapel was supervised by the parish of Altnau, followed by Güttingen between 1620 and 1712 and after 1712 by Scherzingen. The Catholic faith was reintroduced in 1638, and they became part of the Catholic parish of St. Ulrich-Kreuzlingen.

== Geography ==
Lengwil has an area, as of 2009, of 8.89 square kilometers (3.43 sq mi). Of this area, 6.17 km^{2} (2.38 sq mi) or 69.4% is used for agricultural purposes, while 1.61 km^{2} (0.62 sq mi) or 18.1% is forested. Of the rest of the land, 1.01 km^{2} (0.39 sq mi) or 11.4% is settled (buildings or roads), 0.04 km^{2} (9.9 acres) or 0.4% is either rivers or lakes and 0.01 km^{2} (2.5 acres) or 0.1% is unproductive land.

Of the built up area, industrial buildings made up 5.6% of the total area while housing and buildings made up 1.6% and transportation infrastructure made up 0.3%. while parks, green belts and sports fields made up 3.7%. Out of the forested land, all of the forested land area is covered with heavy forests. Of the agricultural land, 64.0% is used for growing crops, while 5.4% is used for orchards or vine crops. All the water in the municipality is in lakes.

It is located in the Seerücken hills south-east of Kreuzlingen. It consists of the former municipalities of Illighausen and Oberhofen, the villages of Dettighofen and Lengwil and the hamlet of Ast.

== Demographics ==
Lengwil has a population (as of December 2020) of 1,730. As of 2008, 14.4% of the population are foreign nationals. Over the last 10 years (1997–2007) the population has changed at a rate of %. Most of the population (as of 2000) speaks German (96.1%), with Italian being second most common (0.9%) and English being third (0.6%).

As of 2008, the gender distribution of the population was 48.9% male and 51.1% female. The population was made up of 525 Swiss men (40.9% of the population), and 103 (8.0%) non-Swiss men. There were 575 Swiss women (44.7%), and 82 (6.4%) non-Swiss women.

In 2008 there were 11 live births to Swiss citizens and 1 birth to non-Swiss citizens, and in same time span there were 6 deaths of Swiss citizens and 1 non-Swiss citizen death. Ignoring immigration and emigration, the population of Swiss citizens increased by 5 while the foreign population remained the same. There were 2 Swiss men who emigrated from Switzerland to another country, 3 Swiss women who emigrated from Switzerland to another country, 5 non-Swiss men who emigrated from Switzerland to another country and 8 non-Swiss women who emigrated from Switzerland to another country. The total Swiss population change in 2008 (from all sources) was an increase of 15 and the non-Swiss population change was an increase of 22 people. This represents a population growth rate of 3.0%.

The age distribution, as of 2009, in Lengwil is; 156 children or 11.4% of the population are between 0 and 9 years old and 178 teenagers or 13.0% are between 10 and 19. Of the adult population, 157 people or 11.5% of the population are between 20 and 29 years old. 191 people or 14.0% are between 30 and 39, 234 people or 17.1% are between 40 and 49, and 208 people or 15.2% are between 50 and 59. The senior population distribution is 131 people or 9.6% of the population are between 60 and 69 years old, 79 people or 5.8% are between 70 and 79, there are 27 people or 2.0% who are between 80 and 89, and there are 6 people or 0.4% who are 90 and older.

As of 2000, there were 428 private households in the municipality, and an average of 2.6 persons per household. In 2000 there were 208 single family homes (or 86.7% of the total) out of a total of 240 inhabited buildings. There were 20 two family buildings (8.3%), 6 three family buildings (2.5%) and 6 multi-family buildings (or 2.5%). There were 230 (or 18.7%) persons who were part of a couple without children, and 703 (or 57.3%) who were part of a couple with children. There were 62 (or 5.1%) people who lived in single parent home, while there are 10 persons who were adult children living with one or both parents, 5 persons who lived in a household made up of relatives, 4 who lived in a household made up of unrelated persons, and 100 who are either institutionalized or live in another type of collective housing.

The vacancy rate for the municipality, in 2008, was 0.95%. As of 2007, the construction rate of new housing units was 4 new units per 1000 residents. In 2000 there were 467 apartments in the municipality. The most common apartment size was the 5 room apartment of which there were 136. There were 14 single room apartments and 102 apartments with six or more rooms. As of 2000 the average price to rent an average apartment in Lengwil was 1110.03 Swiss francs (CHF) per month (US$890, £500, €710 approx. exchange rate from 2000). The average rate for a one-room apartment was 490.00 CHF (US$390, £220, €310), a two-room apartment was about 746.86 CHF (US$600, £340, €480), a three-room apartment was about 974.10 CHF (US$780, £440, €620) and a six or more room apartment cost an average of 1648.27 CHF (US$1320, £740, €1050). The average apartment price in Lengwil was 99.5% of the national average of 1116 CHF.

In the 2007 federal election the most popular party was the SVP which received 49.59% of the vote. The next three most popular parties were the Green Party (12.28%), the CVP (10.32%) and the SP (9.62%). In the federal election, a total of 410 votes were cast, and the voter turnout was 48.8%.

The historical population is given in the following table:

Year	Population Illighausen Ortsgemeinde only	Population Oberhofen bei Kreuzlingen
1850	284	586
1900	295	560
1950	275	568
1990	241	860
Year	Population, Lengwil	
2000	1,227	

== Economy ==
As of 2007, Lengwil had an unemployment rate of 1.15%. As of 2005, there were 119 people employed in the primary economic sector and about 41 businesses involved in this sector. 199 people are employed in the secondary sector and there are 26 businesses in this sector. 400 people are employed in the tertiary sector, with 42 businesses in this sector.

In 2000 there were 880 workers who lived in the municipality. Of these, 419 or about 47.6% of the residents worked outside Lengwil while 556 people commuted into the municipality for work. There were a total of 1,017 jobs (of at least 6 hours per week) in the municipality. Of the working population, 4.5% used public transportation to get to work, and 50.6% used a private car.

== Religion ==
From the 2000 census, 335 or 27.3% were Roman Catholic, while 663 or 54.0% belonged to the Swiss Reformed Church. Of the rest of the population, there are 4 individuals (or about 0.33% of the population) who belong to the Orthodox Church, and there are 56 individuals (or about 4.56% of the population) who belong to another Christian church. There was 1 individual who was Jewish, and 12 (or about 0.98% of the population) who are Islamic. There are 4 individuals (or about 0.33% of the population) who belong to another church (not listed on the census), 120 (or about 9.78% of the population) belong to no church, are agnostic or atheist, and 32 individuals (or about 2.61% of the population) did not answer the question.

== Transport ==
Lengwil sits on the Wil–Kreuzlingen line between Weinfelden and Kreuzlingen and is served by the St. Gallen S-Bahn at Lengwil railway station.

== Education ==
The entire Swiss population is generally well educated. In Lengwil about 73.5% of the population (between age 25 and 64) have completed either non-mandatory upper secondary education or additional higher education (either university or a Fachhochschule).

Lengwil is home to the Oberhofen-Lengwil primary school district. In the 2008/2009 school year there were 78 students. There were 26 children in the kindergarten, and the average class size was 26 kindergartners. Of the children in kindergarten, 11 or 42.3% were female, 4 or 15.4% were not Swiss citizens and 3 or 11.5% did not speak German natively. The lower and upper primary levels begin at about age 5-6 and last for 6 years. There were 27 children in who were at the lower primary level and 25 children in the upper primary level. The average class size in the primary school was 17.33 students. At the lower primary level, there were 17 children or 63.0% of the total population who were female, 1 or 3.7% were not Swiss citizens and 2 or 7.4% did not speak German natively. In the upper primary level, there were 15 or 60.0% who were female, 2 or 8.0% were not Swiss citizens and 2 or 8.0% did not speak German natively.
