= Oberhofen bei Kreuzlingen =

Oberhofen bei Kreuzlingen is a village and former municipality in the canton of Thurgau, Switzerland.

== History ==
First mentioned in 1160 as Obirhovin, it was historically part of a lower court under various noble families from 1376 to 1745. Early graves discovered in the area indicate a long history of settlement.

From 1803 to 1997, Oberhofen bei Kreuzlingen was part of the municipal community of Illighausen, alongside Dettighofen and Lengwil. In 1998, it merged with the neighboring municipality of Illighausen to form the larger municipality of Lengwil.

The Reformation was introduced in 1528, but Catholic services were resumed in 1638. Over the years, the population fluctuated, with 586 inhabitants in 1850 and growing to 860 by 1990. The local economy was initially based on agriculture, dairy farming, and cheese trading. By 1900, industries expanded to include wood, metal, and stone processing. The Ekkharthof residential home was established in 1974, further shaping the village's development.
