= Kreuzlingen District =

Coordinates: 47°38′N 9°10′E

Kreuzlingen District Bezirk Kreuzlingen
- District
- Country: Switzerland
- Canton: Thurgau
- Capital: Kreuzlingen

Area
  - Total: 129.0 km^{2} (49.8 sq mi)

Population (2020)
  - Total: 49,760
  - Density: 385.7/km^{2} (999.1/sq mi)
- Time zone: UTC+1 (CET)
  - Summer (DST): UTC+2 (CEST)
- Municipalities: 14

Kreuzlingen District is one of the five districts of the canton of Thurgau in Switzerland. It has a population of 49,760 (as of 31 December 2020). Its capital is the city of Kreuzlingen.

The district contains the following municipalities:

Coat of arms	Municipality	Population (31 December 2020)	Area km^{2}
	Altnau	2,343	6.7
	Bottighofen	2,397	2.4
	Ermatingen	3,640	10.4
	Gottlieben	337	0.4
	Güttingen	1,668	9.5
	Kemmental	2,603	28.4
	Kreuzlingen	22,390	11.5
	Langrickenbach	1,337	10.9
	Lengwil	1,730	8.9
	Münsterlingen	3,512	5.4
	Raperswilen	416	7.7
	Salenstein	1,411	6.6
	Tägerwilen	4,921	11.6
	Wäldi	1,055	12.3
Total (14)		49,760	129.0
