= Güttingen =

- Municipality
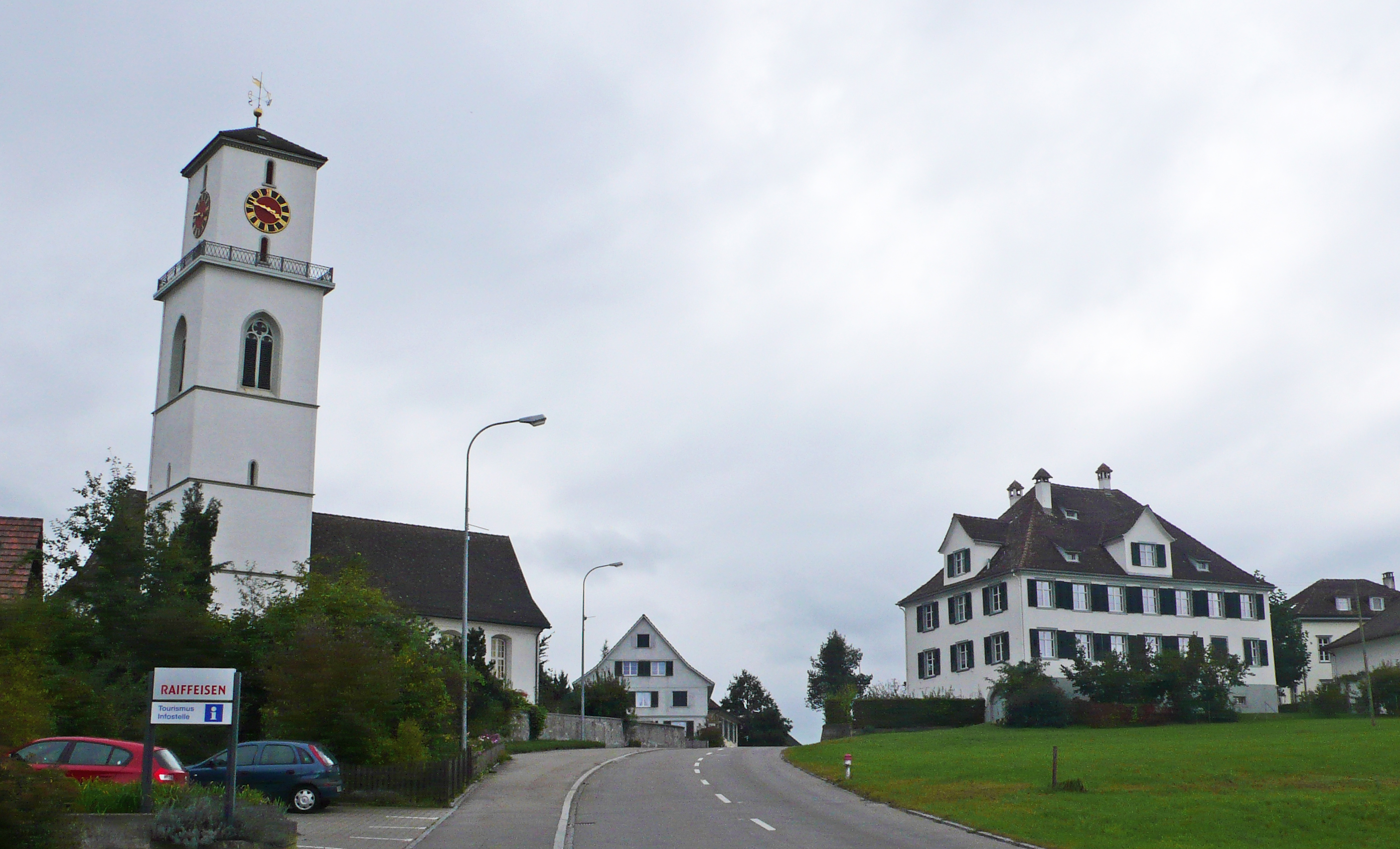

- Coat of arms
- Location of Güttingen
- Location within Switzerland Location within Canton of Thurgau
- Coordinates: 47°36′N 9°18′E
- Country: Switzerland
- Canton: Thurgau
- District: Kreuzlingen

Area
  - Total: 9.5 km^{2} (3.7 sq mi)
- Elevation: 396 m (1,299 ft)

Population (December 2007)
  - Total: 1,389
  - Density: 150/km^{2} (380/sq mi)
- Time zone: UTC+01:00 (CET)
  - Summer (DST): UTC+02:00 (CEST)
- Postal code: 8594
- SFOS number: 4656
- ISO 3166 code: CH-TG
- Surrounded by: Altnau, Hagnau am Bodensee (DE-BW), Immenstaad am Bodensee (DE-BW), Kesswil, Langrickenbach, Sommeri, Stetten (DE-BW)
- Website: guettingen.ch

Güttingen is a municipality in the district of Kreuzlingen in the canton of Thurgau in Switzerland.

== History ==
The earliest traces of human settlement in the area now occupied by the municipality is the Stone Age settlement at Rotfarb/Moosburg which dates from the 4th millennium BC. During the Early Middle Ages there was an Alamanni grave yard in the area. The modern village of Güttingen is first mentioned in 799 as Cutaningin though this comes from a 9th Century copy of the earlier record. In 1155 it was mentioned as Guthingen. The major landlords in Güttingen were the Bishop of Constance and the Abbey of St. Gall. Between 1159 and 1357 the Freiherr of Güttingen were mentioned as landlords and owner of Vogtei In 1359, it became part of the bailiwick of the Lords of Breitenlandenberg. The Bishop of Constance reacquired the Diocese's rights and property in the village in 1452. He held onto these rights until 1798. The bishop appointed a chief bailiff who ruled and held the low court for the village in the castle.

By 1275 there was a church in Güttingen. The right to appoint the church's priest was probably held by the Freiherr of Güttingen. During the Protestant Reformation, the majority in the village converted to the new faith. However, from 1554 to 1848, Kreuzlingen Abbey held the right to appoint the priest. The village church became a shared church, and has remained shared by Catholics and Protestants.

Aerial view from 400 m by Walter Mittelholzer (1924)

Agriculture, shipping and fishing were traditionally the main economic activities in Güttingen. In the 19th century cattle and dairy farming replaced some of the traditional agriculture. A dairy cooperative opened in 1861. Vineyards were replaced with fruit orchards in the early 20th century. In 1920, the agricultural cooperative was founded.

Neither the Seestrasse (Lake Road, built in 1840) or the Seetalbahn (Lake Valley Railroad, opened in 1870) produced any economic growth in the village. In 1835, a Türkisch Rotgarn (an Alizarin red color) dye-works opened in the village. By 1900, an embroidery factory had also moved into Güttingen. In addition to large scale agriculture and a fruit trading company in the late 20th century, most of jobs in the village are in medium commercial and industrial businesses.

== Geography ==
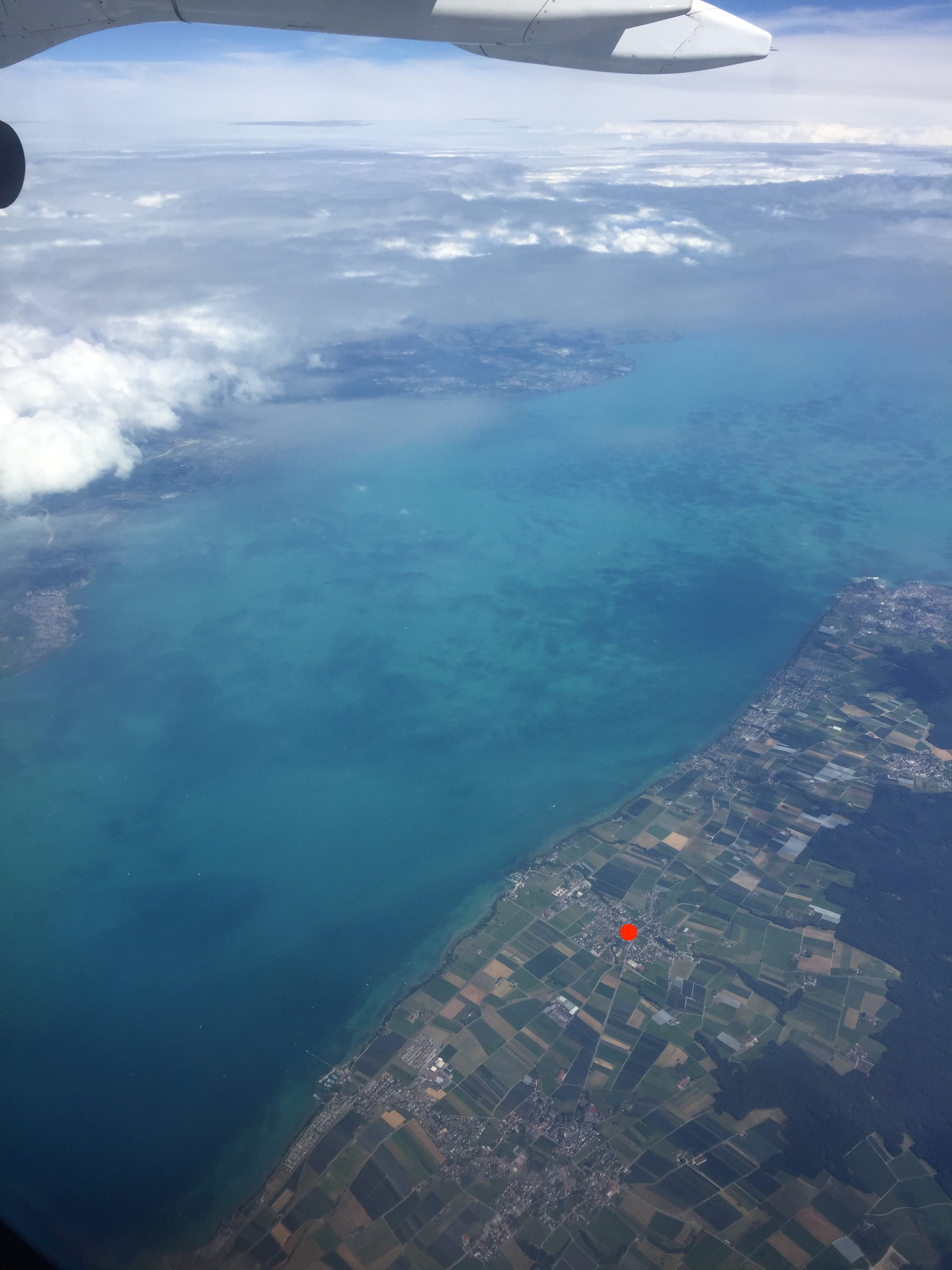
Aerial image of Güttingen and surrounding

Güttingen has an area, as of 2009, of 9.49 square kilometers (3.66 sq mi). Of this area, 5.87 km^{2} (2.27 sq mi) or 61.9% is used for agricultural purposes, while 2.77 km^{2} (1.07 sq mi) or 29.2% is forested. Of the rest of the land, 0.85 km^{2} (0.33 sq mi) or 9.0% is settled (buildings or roads) and 0.01 km^{2} (2.5 acres) or 0.1% is unproductive land.

Of the built up area, industrial buildings made up 4.5% of the total area while housing and buildings made up 0.6% and transportation infrastructure made up 0.4%. while parks, green belts and sports fields made up 3.3%. Out of the forested land, 27.3% of the total land area is heavily forested and 1.9% is covered with orchards or small clusters of trees. Of the agricultural land, 49.6% is used for growing crops, while 12.2% is used for orchards or vine crops.

The municipality is located in the Kreuzlingen district, about 1 km (0.62 mi) from Lake Constance. It consists of the haufendorf village (an irregular, unplanned and quite closely packed village, built around a central square) of Güttingen.

== Demographics ==
Güttingen has a population (as of December 2020) of 1,668. As of 2008, 15.5% of the population are foreign nationals. Over the last 10 years (1997–2007) the population has changed at a rate of 4.7%. Most of the population (as of 2000) speaks German (94.2%), with Albanian being second most common ( 2.6%) and Serbo-Croatian being third ( 0.8%).

As of 2008, the gender distribution of the population was 50.2% male and 49.8% female. The population was made up of 589 Swiss men (41.4% of the population), and 125 (8.8%) non-Swiss men. There were 613 Swiss women (43.1%), and 96 (6.7%) non-Swiss women.

In 2008 there were 12 live births to Swiss citizens and 1 birth to non-Swiss citizens, and in same time span there were 6 deaths of Swiss citizens and 1 non-Swiss citizen death. Ignoring immigration and emigration, the population of Swiss citizens increased by 6 while the foreign population remained the same. There were 1 Swiss woman who emigrated from Switzerland to another country, 12 non-Swiss men who emigrated from Switzerland to another country and 8 non-Swiss women who emigrated from Switzerland to another country. The total Swiss population change in 2008 (from all sources) was an increase of 7 and the non-Swiss population change was an increase of 15 people. This represents a population growth rate of 1.6%.

The age distribution, as of 2009, in Güttingen is; 155 children or 10.8% of the population are between 0 and 9 years old and 196 teenagers or 13.7% are between 10 and 19. Of the adult population, 155 people or 10.8% of the population are between 20 and 29 years old. 152 people or 10.6% are between 30 and 39, 268 people or 18.8% are between 40 and 49, and 204 people or 14.3% are between 50 and 59. The senior population distribution is 153 people or 10.7% of the population are between 60 and 69 years old, 94 people or 6.6% are between 70 and 79, there are 47 people or 3.3% who are between 80 and 89, and there are 5 people or 0.3% who are 90 and older.

As of 2000, there were 500 private households in the municipality, and an average of 2.6 persons per household. In 2000 there were 232 single family homes (or 84.7% of the total) out of a total of 274 inhabited buildings. There were 20 two family buildings (7.3%), 5 three family buildings (1.8%) and 17 multi-family buildings (or 6.2%). There were 272 (or 20.8%) persons who were part of a couple without children, and 757 (or 57.9%) who were part of a couple with children. There were 68 (or 5.2%) people who lived in single parent home, while there are 21 persons who were adult children living with one or both parents, 6 persons who lived in a household made up of relatives, 6 who lived in a household made up of unrelated persons, and 29 who are either institutionalized or live in another type of collective housing.

The vacancy rate for the municipality, in 2008, was 1.1%. As of 2007, the construction rate of new housing units was 0.7 new units per 1000 residents. In 2000 there were 601 apartments in the municipality. The most common apartment size was the 6-room apartment of which there were 154. There were 40 single room apartments and 154 apartments with six or more rooms. As of 2000 the average price to rent an average apartment in Güttingen was 1019.65 Swiss francs (CHF) per month (US$820, £460, €650 approx. exchange rate from 2000). The average rate for a one-room apartment was 512.50 CHF (US$410, £230, €330), a two-room apartment was about 721.25 CHF (US$580, £320, €460), a three-room apartment was about 759.74 CHF (US$610, £340, €490) and a six or more room apartment cost an average of 1635.35 CHF (US$1310, £740, €1050). The average apartment price in Güttingen was 91.4% of the national average of 1116 CHF.

In the 2007 federal election the most popular party was the SVP which received 48.47% of the vote. The next three most popular parties were the Green Party (13.07%), the CVP (11.38%) and the FDP (10.76%). In the federal election, a total of 467 votes were cast, and the voter turnout was 50.9%.

The historical population is given in the following table:

year	population
1850	780
1900	917
1950	970
1980	1,024
1990	1,102
2000	1,308

== Economy ==
As of 2007, Güttingen had an unemployment rate of 1.04%. As of 2005, there were 135 people employed in the primary economic sector and about 39 businesses involved in this sector. 185 people are employed in the secondary sector and there are 31 businesses in this sector. 208 people are employed in the tertiary sector, with 44 businesses in this sector.

In 2000 there were 937 workers who lived in the municipality. Of these, 435 or about 46.4% of the residents worked outside Güttingen while 225 people commuted into the municipality for work. There were a total of 727 jobs (of at least 6 hours per week) in the municipality. Of the working population, 11% used public transportation to get to work, and 43.8% used a private car.

== Religion ==
From the 2000 census, 425 or 32.5% were Roman Catholic, while 604 or 46.2% belonged to the Swiss Reformed Church. Of the rest of the population, there are 6 individuals (or about 0.46% of the population) who belong to the Orthodox Church, and there are 30 individuals (or about 2.29% of the population) who belong to another Christian church. There were 79 (or about 6.04% of the population) who are Islamic. There are 2 individuals (or about 0.15% of the population) who belong to another church (not listed on the census), 132 (or about 10.09% of the population) belong to no church, are agnostic or atheist, and 30 individuals (or about 2.29% of the population) did not answer the question.

== Transport ==
Güttingen sits on the Lake Line between Schaffhausen and Rorschach and is served by the St. Gallen S-Bahn at Güttingen railway station.

== Education ==
The entire Swiss population is generally well educated. In Güttingen about 75.7% of the population (between age 25–64) have completed either non-mandatory upper secondary education or additional higher education (either university or a Fachhochschule).

== Climate ==
Between 1991 and 2020 Güttingen had an average of 122.1 days of rain or snow per year and on average received 950 mm (37 in) of precipitation. The wettest month was June during which time Güttingen received an average of 110 mm (4.3 in) of rain or snow. During this month there was precipitation for an average of 11.6 days which is also the month with the most days of precipitation. The driest month of the year was February with an average of 53 mm (2.1 in) of precipitation over 8.7 days.

Climate data for Güttingen, elevation 440 m (1,440 ft), (1991–2020)
Month	Jan	Feb	Mar	Apr	May	Jun	Jul	Aug	Sep	Oct	Nov	Dec	Year
Mean daily maximum °C (°F)	3.4 (38.1)	5.0 (41.0)	10.1 (50.2)	14.7 (58.5)	19.1 (66.4)	22.6 (72.7)	24.5 (76.1)	24.1 (75.4)	19.2 (66.6)	13.7 (56.7)	7.6 (45.7)	4.0 (39.2)	14.0 (57.2)
Daily mean °C (°F)	1.0 (33.8)	1.6 (34.9)	5.5 (41.9)	9.4 (48.9)	13.7 (56.7)	17.4 (63.3)	19.1 (66.4)	18.6 (65.5)	14.4 (57.9)	9.9 (49.8)	5.0 (41.0)	1.8 (35.2)	9.8 (49.6)
Mean daily minimum °C (°F)	−1.6 (29.1)	−1.5 (29.3)	1.3 (34.3)	4.2 (39.6)	8.6 (47.5)	12.2 (54.0)	13.9 (57.0)	13.8 (56.8)	10.3 (50.5)	6.6 (43.9)	2.3 (36.1)	−0.7 (30.7)	5.8 (42.4)
Average precipitation mm (inches)	54.6 (2.15)	52.7 (2.07)	59.6 (2.35)	65.1 (2.56)	100.3 (3.95)	110.0 (4.33)	107.9 (4.25)	108.0 (4.25)	79.3 (3.12)	70.9 (2.79)	67.3 (2.65)	74.8 (2.94)	950.5 (37.42)
Average snowfall cm (inches)	10.6 (4.2)	12.8 (5.0)	4.1 (1.6)	0.0 (0.0)	0.0 (0.0)	0.0 (0.0)	0.0 (0.0)	0.0 (0.0)	0.0 (0.0)	0.1 (0.0)	3.6 (1.4)	8.0 (3.1)	39.2 (15.4)
Average precipitation days (≥ 1.0 mm)	9.5	8.7	9.8	9.6	11.1	11.6	11.3	11.1	9.6	9.7	9.4	10.7	122.1
Average snowy days (≥ 1.0 cm)	3.6	3.4	1.7	0.0	0.0	0.0	0.0	0.0	0.0	0.0	1.2	2.8	12.7
Average relative humidity (%)	85	81	76	72	74	74	75	78	83	87	88	87	80
Mean monthly sunshine hours	44.4	74.8	140.8	182.0	201.4	218.1	237.5	217.4	157.3	91.8	47.6	36.5	1,649.6
Percentage possible sunshine	18	28	41	47	45	48	52	52	45	30	19	16	40
Source 1: NOAA
Source 2: MeteoSwiss (snow 1981–2010)

The strength of Bise wind – which can lead to severe icing in winter around Lake Geneva – can be determined by the difference in air pressure (in hectopascal [hPa]) between Güttingen and Geneva. Bise arises as soon as the air pressure in Güttingen is higher than in Geneva.
