= Langrickenbach =

- Municipality
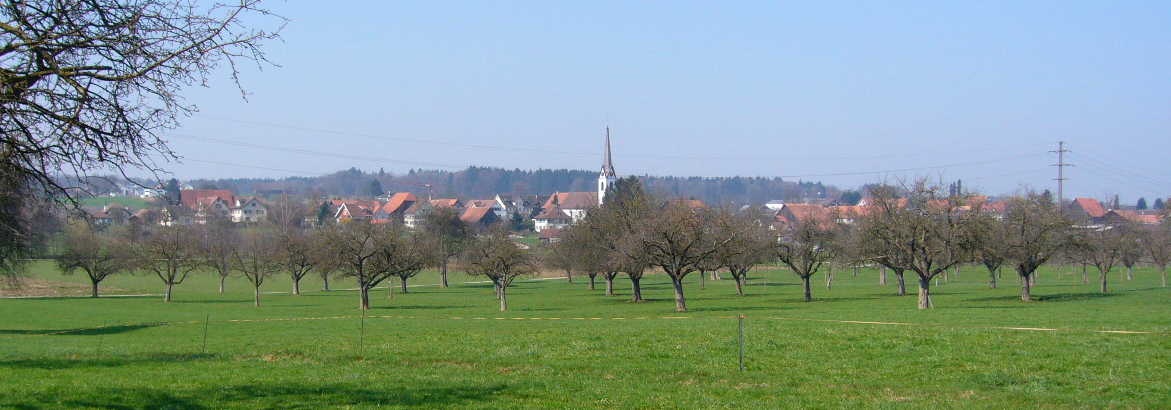

- Coat of arms
- Location of Langrickenbach
- Location within Switzerland Location within Canton of Thurgau
- Coordinates: 47°34′N 9°13′E
- Country: Switzerland
- Canton: Thurgau
- District: Kreuzlingen

Area
  - Total: 10.85 km^{2} (4.19 sq mi)
- Elevation: 522 m (1,713 ft)

Population (December 2007)
  - Total: 1,099
  - Density: 101.3/km^{2} (262.3/sq mi)
- Time zone: UTC+01:00 (CET)
  - Summer (DST): UTC+02:00 (CEST)
- Postal code: 8585
- SFOS number: 4681
- ISO 3166 code: CH-TG
- Surrounded by: Altnau, Birwinken, Erlen, Güttingen, Lengwil, Münsterlingen, Sommeri
- Website: www.langrickenbach.ch

Langrickenbach is a municipality in the district of Kreuzlingen in the canton of Thurgau in Switzerland.

== History ==
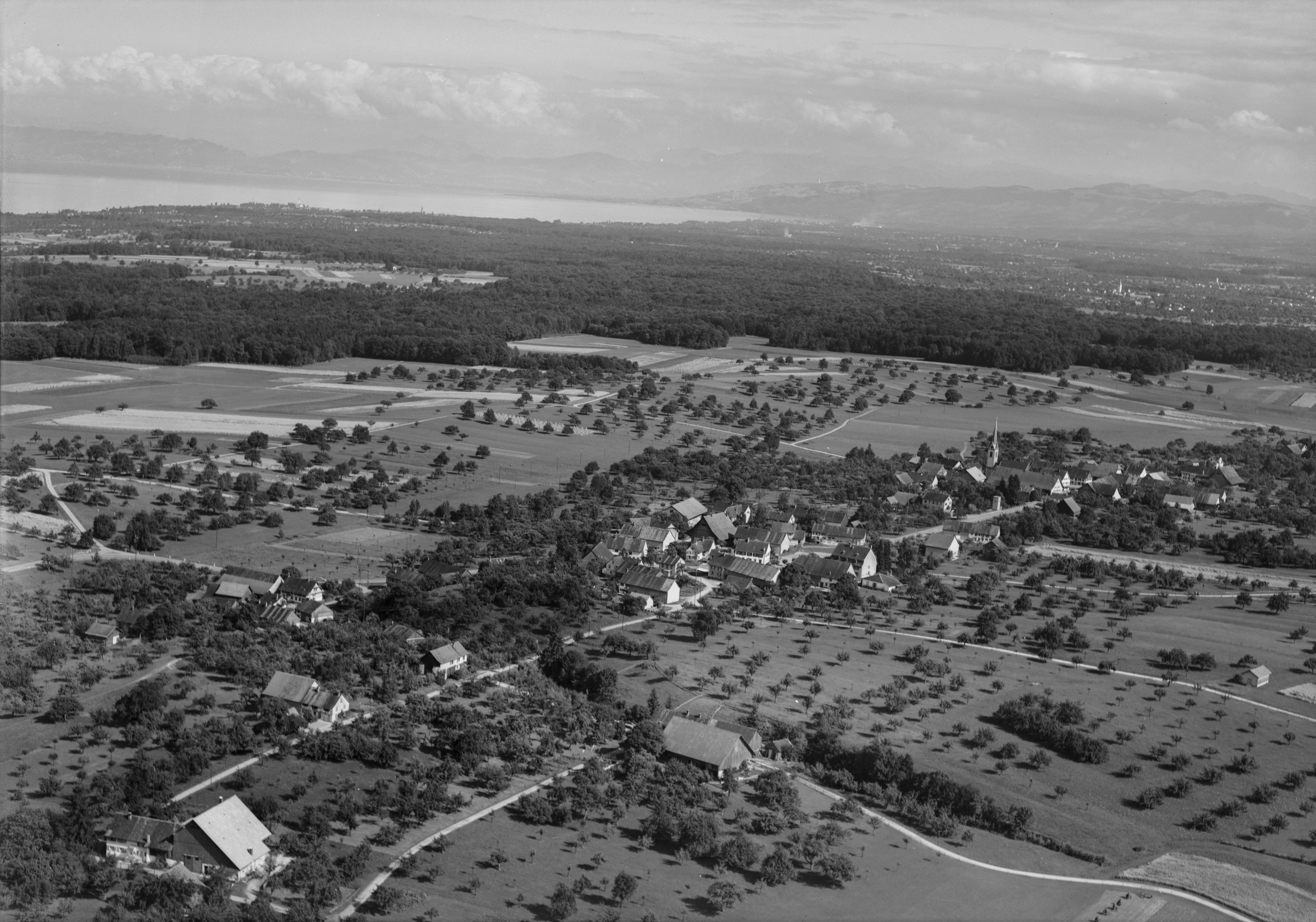
Aerial view (1954)

Langrickenbach is first mentioned in 889 as Rihchinbahc. Together with Greuter, it was acquired by the Lords of Helmsdorf in 1351. Between 1521 and 1798 it belonged to the cathedral of Konstanz. Any low court verdict in Langrickenbach was automatically appealed to the high court at Konstanz. Most of the settlement of Belzstadel belonged to Münsterlingen until 1798. A village church was first mentioned around 900. Since the Protestant Reformation in 1529 the Catholics attend the church in Altnau. The current municipality was formed in 1998 when Herrenhof, Langrickenbach, Schönenbaumgarten and Zuben merged into Langrickenbach.

== Geography ==
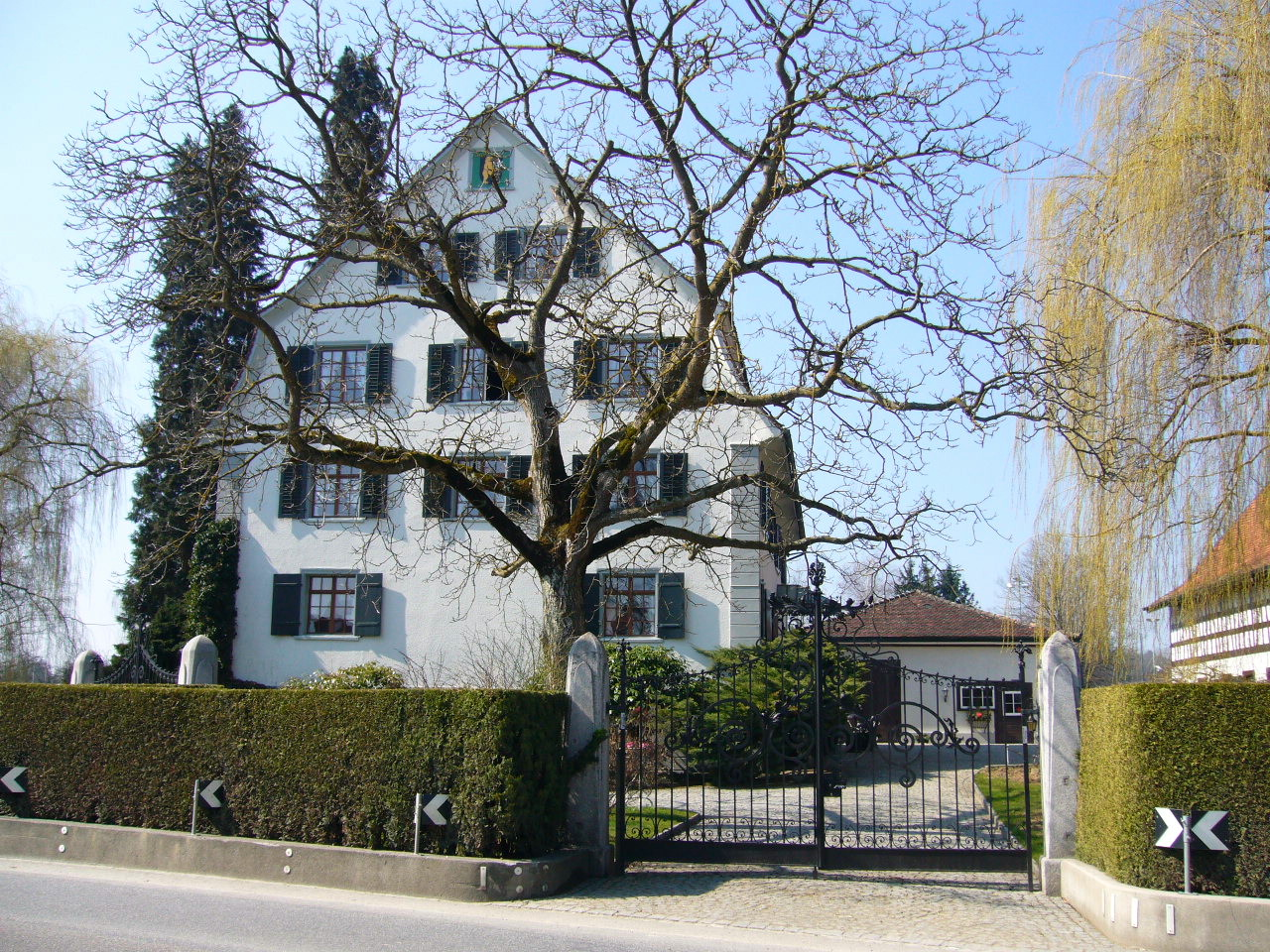
Herrenhof village in Langrickenbach

Langrickenbach has an area, as of 2009, of 10.85 square kilometers (4.19 sq mi). Of this area, 8.25 km^{2} (3.19 sq mi) or 76.0% is used for agricultural purposes, while 1.8 km^{2} (0.69 sq mi) or 16.6% is forested. Of the rest of the land, 0.79 km^{2} (0.31 sq mi) or 7.3% is settled (buildings or roads), 0.03 km^{2} (7.4 acres) or 0.3% is either rivers or lakes.

Of the built up area, industrial buildings made up 4.1% of the total area while housing and buildings made up 0.1% and transportation infrastructure made up 0.2%. Parks, green belts and sports fields made up 2.9%. All of the forested land area is covered with heavy forests. Of the agricultural land, 64.1% is used for growing crops, while 12.0% is used for orchards or vine crops. All the water in the municipality is flowing water.

The municipality is located in the Kreuzlingen district at the intersection of the Sulgen-Altnau and Amriswil-Konstanz roads. It consists of the village of Langrickenbach (with the sections of Belzstadel and Unter-Greut) and the settlements of Dünnershaus, Herrenhof, Illighausen, Schönenbaumgarten and Zuben.

== Demographics ==
Langrickenbach has a population (as of December 2020) of 1,337. As of 2008, 9.4% of the population are foreign nationals. Over the last 10 years (1997–2007) the population has changed at a rate of %. Most of the population (as of 2000) speaks German (97.3%), with Italian being second most common ( 0.5%) and Romansh being third ( 0.4%).

As of 2008, the gender distribution of the population was 51.9% male and 48.1% female. The population was made up of 525 Swiss men (47.0% of the population), and 55 (4.9%) non-Swiss men. There were 487 Swiss women (43.6%), and 50 (4.5%) non-Swiss women.

In 2008 there were 12 live births to Swiss citizens and 1 birth to non-Swiss citizens, and in same time span there were 10 deaths of Swiss citizens. Ignoring immigration and emigration, the population of Swiss citizens increased by 2 while the foreign population increased by 1. There were 4 Swiss men who emigrated from Switzerland to another country, 4 Swiss women who emigrated from Switzerland to another country, 11 non-Swiss men who emigrated from Switzerland to another country and 4 non-Swiss women who emigrated from Switzerland to another country. The total Swiss population change in 2008 (from all sources) was a decrease of 7 and the non-Swiss population change was an increase of 15 people. This represents a population growth rate of 0.7%.

The age distribution, as of 2009, in Langrickenbach is; 114 children or 10.3% of the population are between 0 and 9 years old and 189 teenagers or 17.1% are between 10 and 19. Of the adult population, 111 people or 10.0% of the population are between 20 and 29 years old. 119 people or 10.7% are between 30 and 39, 239 people or 21.6% are between 40 and 49, and 154 people or 13.9% are between 50 and 59. The senior population distribution is 80 people or 7.2% of the population are between 60 and 69 years old, 55 people or 5.0% are between 70 and 79, there are 42 people or 3.8% who are between 80 and 89, and there are 5 people or 0.5% who are 90 and older.

As of 2000, there were 374 private households in the municipality, and an average of 2.7 persons per household. In 2000 there were 164 single family homes (or 85.4% of the total) out of a total of 192 inhabited buildings. There were 22 two family buildings (11.5%), 2 three family buildings (1.0%) and 4 multi-family buildings (or 2.1%). There were 238 (or 23.2%) persons who were part of a couple without children, and 618 (or 60.1%) who were part of a couple with children. There were 53 (or 5.2%) people who lived in single parent home, while there are 12 persons who were adult children living with one or both parents, 2 persons who lived in a household made up of relatives, 6 who lived in a household made up of unrelated persons, and 15 who are either institutionalized or live in another type of collective housing.

The vacancy rate for the municipality, in 2008, was 2.27%. As of 2007, the construction rate of new housing units was 5.4 new units per 1000 residents. In 2000 there were 389 apartments in the municipality. The most common apartment size was the 6 room apartment of which there were 136. There were 4 single room apartments and 136 apartments with six or more rooms.

In the 2007 federal election the most popular party was the SVP which received 57.74% of the vote. The next three most popular parties were the CVP (10.67%), the SP (7.5%) and the FDP (6.38%). In the federal election, a total of 359 votes were cast, and the voter turnout was 47.5%.

The historical population is given in the following table:

year	population
1850	1,178
1900	1,093
1950	1,014
1990	879
2000	1,042

== Economy ==
As of 2007, Langrickenbach had an unemployment rate of 1.65%. As of 2005, there were 193 people employed in the primary economic sector and about 65 businesses involved in this sector. 46 people are employed in the secondary sector and there are 15 businesses in this sector. 85 people are employed in the tertiary sector, with 27 businesses in this sector.

In 2000 there were 702 workers who lived in the municipality. Of these, 335 or about 47.7% of the residents worked outside Langrickenbach while 45 people commuted into the municipality for work. There were a total of 412 jobs (of at least 6 hours per week) in the municipality. Of the working population, 4.2% used public transportation to get to work, and 50.4% used a private car.

== Religion ==
From the 2000 census, 252 or 24.5% were Roman Catholic, while 586 or 57.0% belonged to the Swiss Reformed Church. Of the rest of the population, there is 1 individual who belongs to the Orthodox Church, and there are 64 individuals (or about 6.23% of the population) who belong to another Christian church. There were 2 (or about 0.19% of the population) who are Islamic. There are 2 individuals (or about 0.19% of the population) who belong to another church (not listed on the census), 81 (or about 7.88% of the population) belong to no church, are agnostic or atheist, and 40 individuals (or about 3.89% of the population) did not answer the question.

== Education ==
The entire Swiss population is generally well educated. In Langrickenbach about 75.1% of the population (between age 25-64) have completed either non-mandatory upper secondary education or additional higher education (either university or a Fachhochschule).

Langrickenbach is home to the Langrickenbach primary school district. In the 2008/2009 school year there were 122 students. There were 20 children in the kindergarten, and the average class size was 20 kindergartners. Of the children in kindergarten, 11 or 55.0% were female and 2 or 10.0% were not Swiss citizens. The lower and upper primary levels begin at about age 5-6 and last for 6 years. There were 46 children in who were at the lower primary level and 56 children in the upper primary level. The average class size in the primary school was 20.4 students. At the lower primary level, there were 22 children or 47.8% of the total population who were female, and 6 or 13.0% who were not Swiss citizens. In the upper primary level, there were 29 or 51.8% who were female, and 4 or 7.1% who were not Swiss citizens.
