= Illighausen =

Swiss village

Coordinates: 47°36′15″N 9°12′29″E

Illighausen is a village and former municipality in the canton of Thurgau, Switzerland.

== History ==
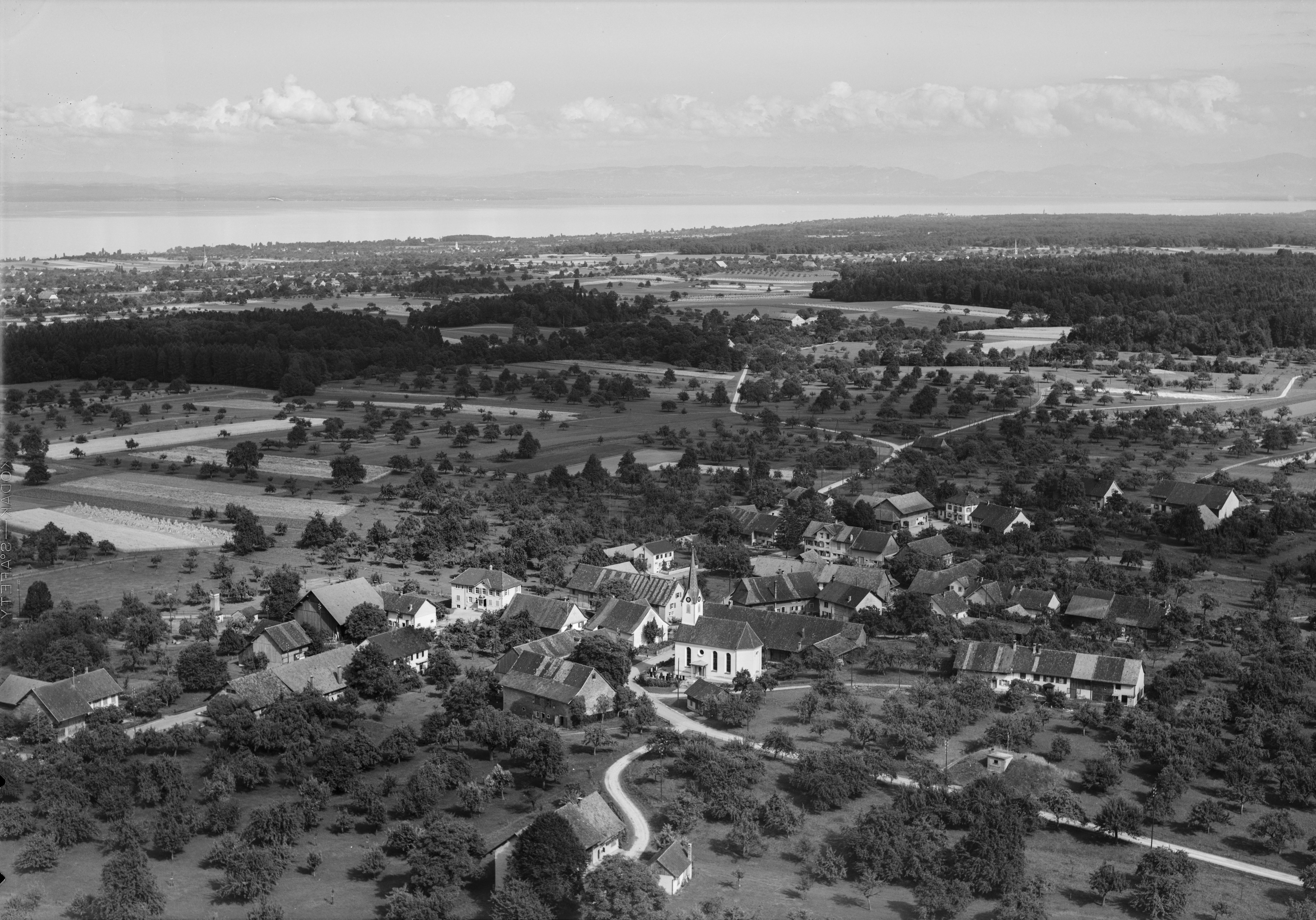
Aerial view (1954)

It was first recorded in the year 1176 as Illinchusen.

== Population ==
The municipality had 284 inhabitants in 1850, which increased to 295 in 1900 but then decreased to 275 in 1950 and 241 in 1990.

== Geography ==
In 1998 the municipality was merged with the neighboring municipality Oberhofen bei Kreuzlingen, to form a new and larger municipality called Lengwil.
