= Altnau =

Municipality in Thurgau, Switzerland

- Municipality
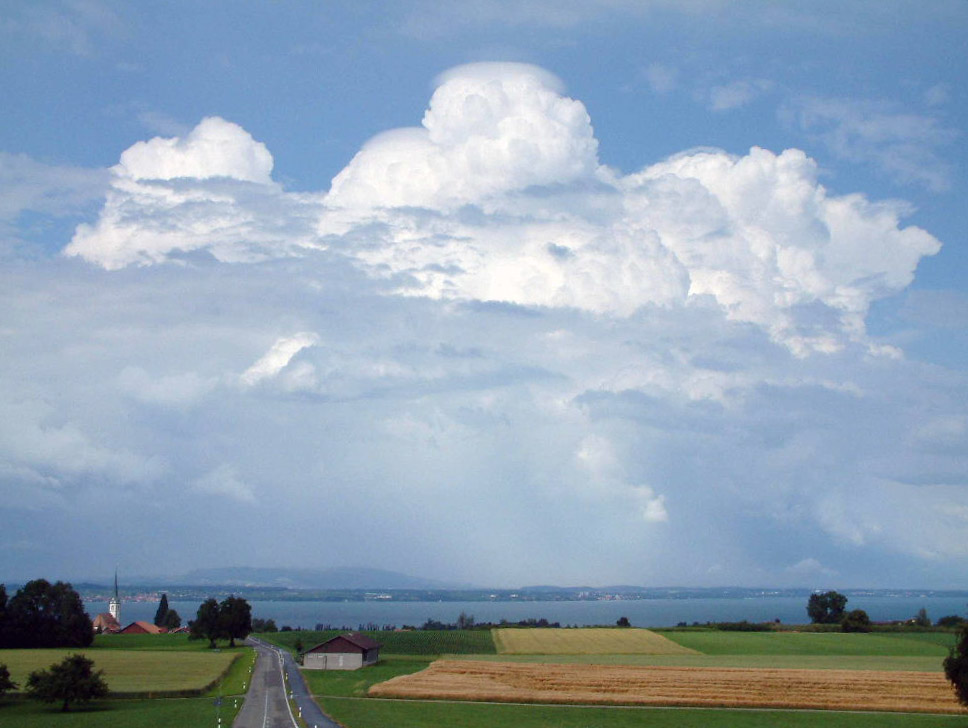

- Flag Coat of arms
- Location of Altnau
- Location within Switzerland Location within Canton of Thurgau
- Coordinates: 47°37′N 9°15′E
- Country: Switzerland
- Canton: Thurgau
- District: Kreuzlingen

Area
  - Total: 6.68 km^{2} (2.58 sq mi)
- Elevation: 471 m (1,545 ft)

Population (December 2007)
  - Total: 1,869
  - Density: 280/km^{2} (725/sq mi)
- Time zone: UTC+01:00 (CET)
  - Summer (DST): UTC+02:00 (CEST)
- Postal code: 8595
- SFOS number: 4641
- ISO 3166 code: CH-TG
- Surrounded by: Güttingen, Hagnau am Bodensee (DE-BW), Langrickenbach, Münsterlingen, Stetten (DE-BW)
- Website: www.altnau.ch

Altnau is a municipality in the district of Kreuzlingen in the canton of Thurgau in Switzerland.

== History ==
Near the hamlet of Ruderbaum, the remains of a Horgen culture settlement have been discovered. Below the Horgen site, there also may be a Pfyn culture site, but that is less certain.

The modern village of Altnau may be first mentioned in 787 as Althinouva. In the 8th Century the Abbey of St. Gall owned most of the land in Altnau. In 1155, Emperor Friedrich Barbarossa confirmed that the Cathedral of Constance owned the church and church yard in the village. The vogt right over the church's farms belonged to the Freiherr of Altenklingen after 1300. During the Late Middle Ages, this right was given to several noble families from Constance; 1378 Schwarz, 1430 Tettikofen, 1468 Mangolte, and from 1471 until 1798 the city of Constance directly controlled the farms. In 1454 the villagers were represented in the Appenzell Landrecht, but following complaints from Constance they were forced to give up their membership. The rights of the village are first listed in the Gerichtsoffnung of 1468.

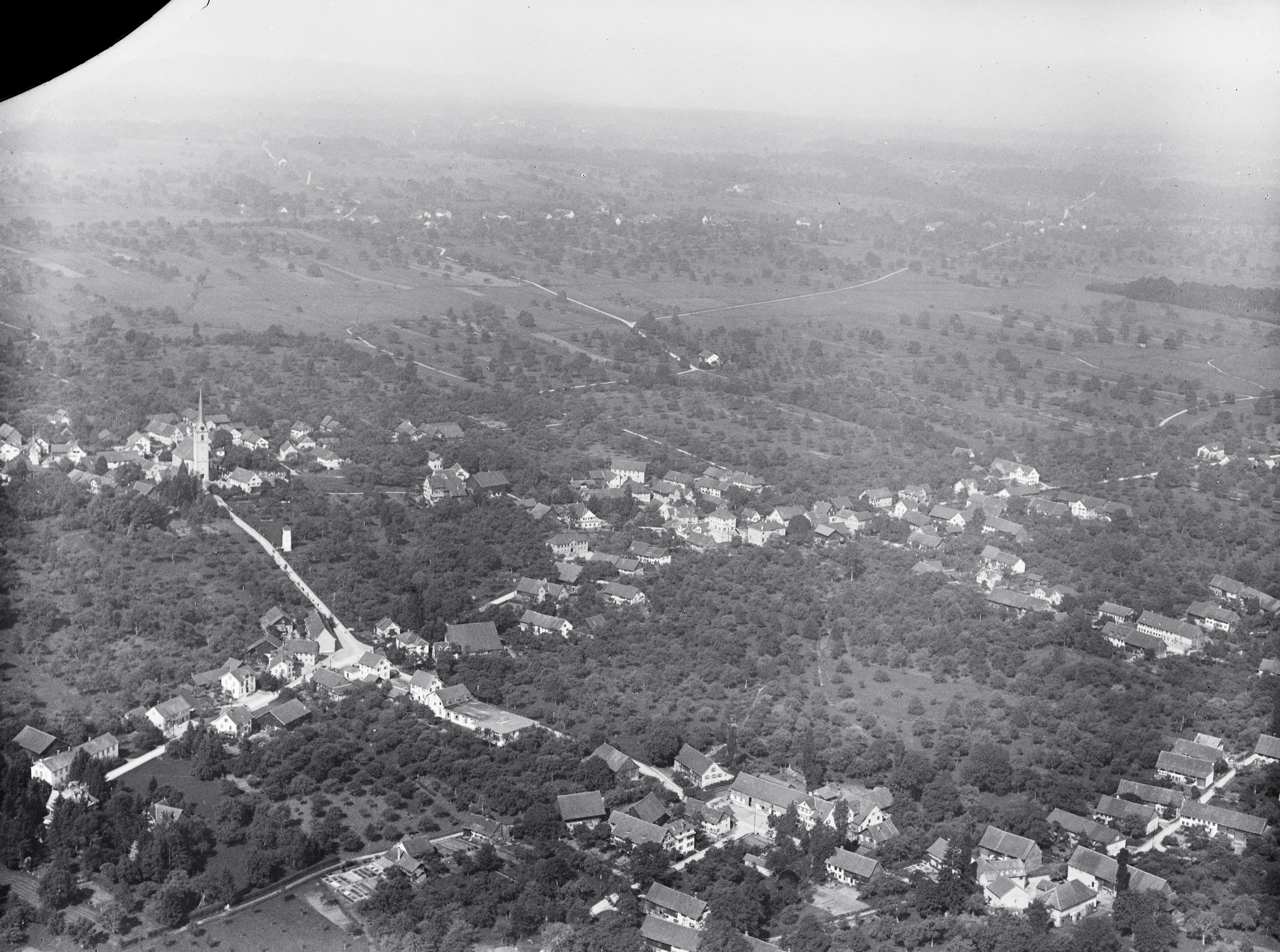
Aerial view from 400 m by Walter Mittelholzer (1924)

The right to administer the parish of Altnau went from the cathedral's provost to the cathedral's dean in 1347. After the Protestant Reformation in 1528, the few remaining Catholics were looked after by Constance and the village church became a shared church. This situation remained until 1810 when two churches were completed.

Until the 19th Century, most of the local economy revolved around three-field agriculture. About 1880 a dairy company was founded in the village, and livestock and cheese production became common. Viticulture was common from the Middle Ages until 1912. In 1840 the Seestrasse (Lake Road) was built, and in 1870, the Seetalbahn (railroad line) was added. However, neither the road or the railroad led to a boost in the local economy, as the station was too far away.

== Geography ==
Altnau has an area, as of 2009, of 6.68 square kilometers (2.58 sq mi). Of this area, 4.72 km^{2} (1.82 sq mi) or 70.7% is used for agricultural purposes, while 1.03 km^{2} (0.40 sq mi) or 15.4% is forested. Of the rest of the land, 0.93 km^{2} (0.36 sq mi) or 13.9% is settled (buildings or roads), 0.02 km^{2} (4.9 acres) or 0.3% is either rivers or lakes.

Of the built up area, industrial buildings made up 7.0% of the total area while housing and buildings made up 0.6% and transportation infrastructure made up 0.7%. Power and water infrastructure as well as other special developed areas made up 1.6% of the area while parks, green belts and sports fields made up 3.9%. Out of the forested land, all of the forested land area is covered with heavy forests. Of the agricultural land, 47.2% is used for growing crops, while 23.5% is used for orchards or vine crops. All the water in the municipality is flowing water.

The municipality is located in the Kreuzlingen district along the Romanshorn-Kreuzlingen road about 2 km (1.2 mi) from Lake Constance.

== Demographics ==
Altnau has a population (as of December 2020) of 2,343. As of 2008, 15.5% of the population are foreign nationals. Over the last 10 years (1997–2007) the population has changed at a rate of 11.8%. Most of the population (as of 2000) speaks German (94.5%), with Albanian being second most common ( 1.1%) and Italian being third ( 0.9%).

As of 2008, the gender distribution of the population was 51.2% male and 48.8% female. The population was made up of 829 Swiss men (42.5% of the population), and 170 (8.7%) non-Swiss men. There were 819 Swiss women (42.0%), and 133 (6.8%) non-Swiss women.

In 2008 there were 17 live births to Swiss citizens and 4 births to non-Swiss citizens, and in same time span there were 8 deaths of Swiss citizens. Ignoring immigration and emigration, the population of Swiss citizens increased by 9 while the foreign population increased by 4. There was 1 Swiss man, 1 Swiss woman who emigrated from Switzerland to another country, 10 non-Swiss men who emigrated from Switzerland to another country and 12 non-Swiss women who emigrated from Switzerland to another country. The total Swiss population change in 2008 (from all sources) was an increase of 57 and the non-Swiss population change was an increase of 13 people. This represents a population growth rate of 3.7%.

The age distribution, as of 2009, in Altnau is; 199 children or 10.0% of the population are between 0 and 9 years old and 295 teenagers or 14.9% are between 10 and 19. Of the adult population, 193 people or 9.7% of the population are between 20 and 29 years old. 247 people or 12.5% are between 30 and 39, 395 people or 19.9% are between 40 and 49, and 277 people or 14.0% are between 50 and 59. The senior population distribution is 222 people or 11.2% of the population are between 60 and 69 years old, 104 people or 5.2% are between 70 and 79, there are 45 people or 2.3% who are between 80 and 89, and there are 4 people or 0.2% who are 90 and older.

As of 2000, there were 679 private households in the municipality, and an average of 2.6 persons per household. In 2000 there were 351 single family homes (or 84.0% of the total) out of a total of 418 inhabited buildings. There were 32 two family buildings (7.7%), 11 three family buildings (2.6%) and 24 multi-family buildings (or 5.7%). There were 384 (or 21.3%) persons who were part of a couple without children, and 1,101 (or 61.0%) who were part of a couple with children. There were 108 (or 6.0%) people who lived in single parent home, while there are 6 persons who were adult children living with one or both parents, 6 persons who lived in a household made up of relatives, 26 who lived in a household made up of unrelated persons, and 9 who are either institutionalized or live in another type of collective housing.

The vacancy rate for the municipality, in 2008, was 0.73%. As of 2007, the construction rate of new housing units was 3.7 new units per 1000 residents. In 2000 there were 751 apartments in the municipality. The most common apartment size was the 5 room apartment of which there were 202. There were 16 single room apartments and 183 apartments with six or more rooms. As of 2000 the average price to rent an average apartment in Altnau was 1109.58 Swiss francs (CHF) per month (US$890, £500, €710 approx. exchange rate from 2000). The average rate for a one-room apartment was 466.43 CHF (US$370, £210, €300), a two-room apartment was about 728.08 CHF (US$580, £330, €470), a three-room apartment was about 787.67 CHF (US$630, £350, €500) and a six or more room apartment cost an average of 1543.68 CHF (US$1230, £690, €990). The average apartment price in Altnau was 99.4% of the national average of 1116 CHF.

In the 2007 federal election the most popular party was the SVP which received 38.69% of the vote. The next three most popular parties were the Green Party (17.58%), the FDP (14.91%) and the CVP (11.74%). In the federal election, a total of 560 votes were cast, and the voter turnout was 45.6%.

The historical population is given in the following table:

year	population
1850	869
1910	1,001
1970	957
1980	1,036
1990	1,439
2000	1,804

== Sights ==
The entire village of Altnau is designated as part of the Inventory of Swiss Heritage Sites.

== Economy ==
As of 2007, Altnau had an unemployment rate of 1.46%. As of 2005, there were 100 people employed in the primary economic sector and about 32 businesses involved in this sector. 187 people are employed in the secondary sector and there are 35 businesses in this sector. 317 people are employed in the tertiary sector, with 66 businesses in this sector.

In 2000 there were 1,311 workers who lived in the municipality. Of these, 632 or about 48.2% of the residents worked outside Altnau while 192 people commuted into the municipality for work. There were a total of 871 jobs (of at least 6 hours per week) in the municipality. Of the working population, 9.9% used public transportation to get to work, and 49.1% used a private car.

== Religion ==
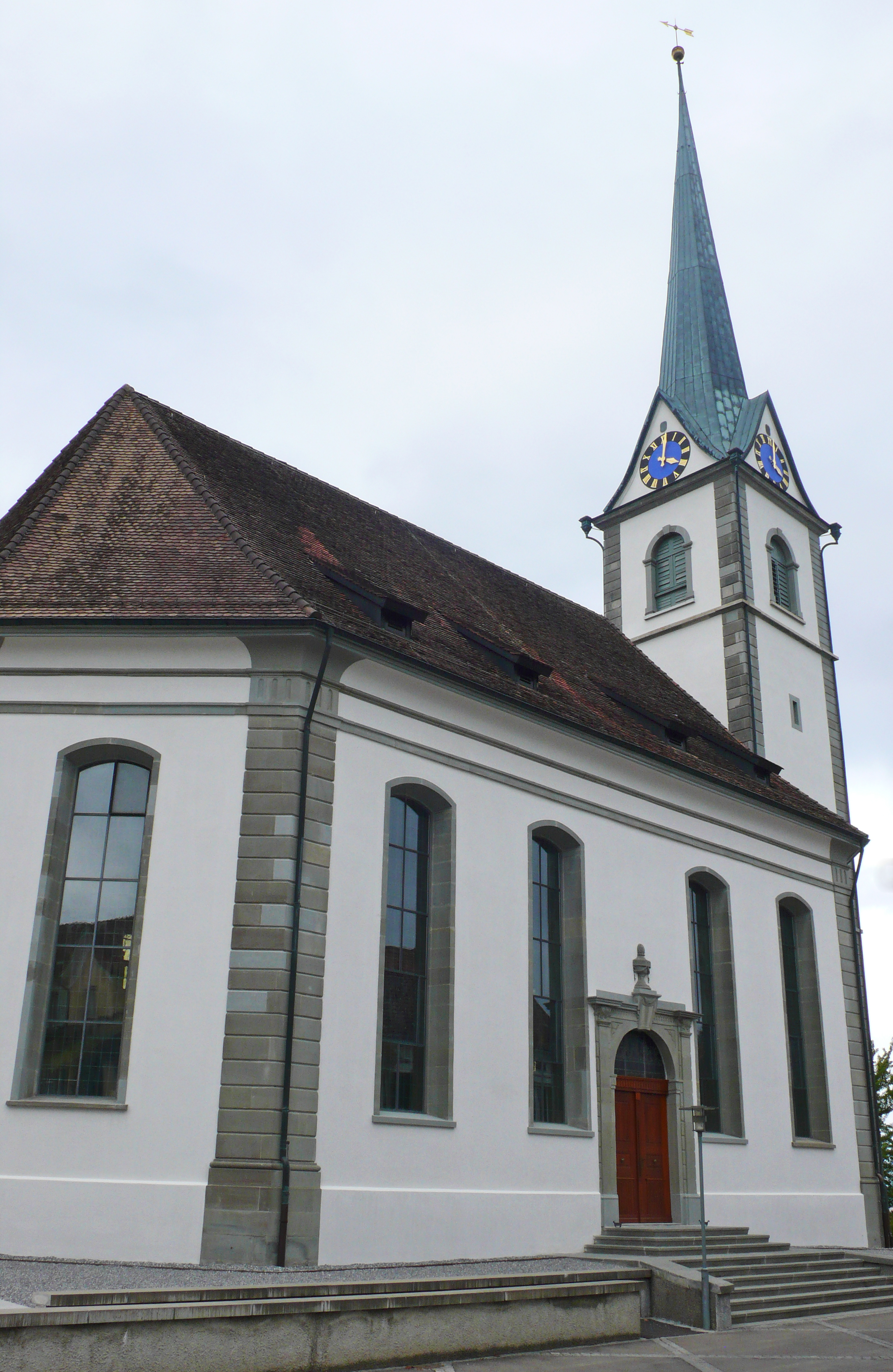
Swiss Reformed Church in Altnau

From the 2000 census, 570 or 31.6% were Roman Catholic, while 881 or 48.8% belonged to the Swiss Reformed Church. Of the rest of the population, there are 5 individuals (or about 0.28% of the population) who belong to the Orthodox Church, and there are 74 individuals (or about 4.10% of the population) who belong to another Christian church. There were 43 (or about 2.38% of the population) who are Islamic. There are 4 individuals (or about 0.22% of the population) who belong to another church (not listed on the census), 169 (or about 9.37% of the population) belong to no church, are agnostic or atheist, and 58 individuals (or about 3.22% of the population) did not answer the question.

== Transport ==
Altnau sits on the Lake Line between Schaffhausen and Rorschach and is served by the St. Gallen S-Bahn at Altnau railway station.

== Education ==
In Altnau about 79.2% of the population (between age 25-64) have completed either non-mandatory upper secondary education or additional higher education (either university or a Fachhochschule).

Altnau is home to the Altnau primary school district. It is also home to the Altnau secondary school district. In the 2008/2009 school year there were 176 students in the primary school district. There were 44 children in the kindergarten, and the average class size was 22 kindergartners. Of the children in kindergarten, 18 or 40.9% were female, 7 or 15.9% were not Swiss citizens and 2 or 4.5% did not speak German natively. The lower and upper primary levels begin at about age 5-6 and last for 6 years. There were 59 children in who were at the lower primary level and 73 children in the upper primary level. The average class size in the primary school was 22 students. At the lower primary level, there were 26 children or 44.1% of the total population who were female, 5 or 8.5% were not Swiss citizens and 1 or 1.7% did not speak German natively. In the upper primary level, there were 35 or 47.9% who were female, 6 or 8.2% were not Swiss citizens and 3 or 4.1% did not speak German natively.

There are 273 students in the secondary school district. At the secondary level, students are divided according to performance. The secondary level begins at about age 12 and usually lasts 3 years. There were 178 teenagers who were in the advanced school, of which 97 or 54.5% were female, 15 or 8.4% were not Swiss citizens and 7 or 3.9% did not speak German natively. There were 95 teenagers who were in the standard school, of which 47 or 49.5% were female, 23 or 24.2% were not Swiss citizens and 18 or 18.9% did not speak German natively. The average class size for all classes at the secondary level was 18.2 students.
