= Birwinken =

- Municipality
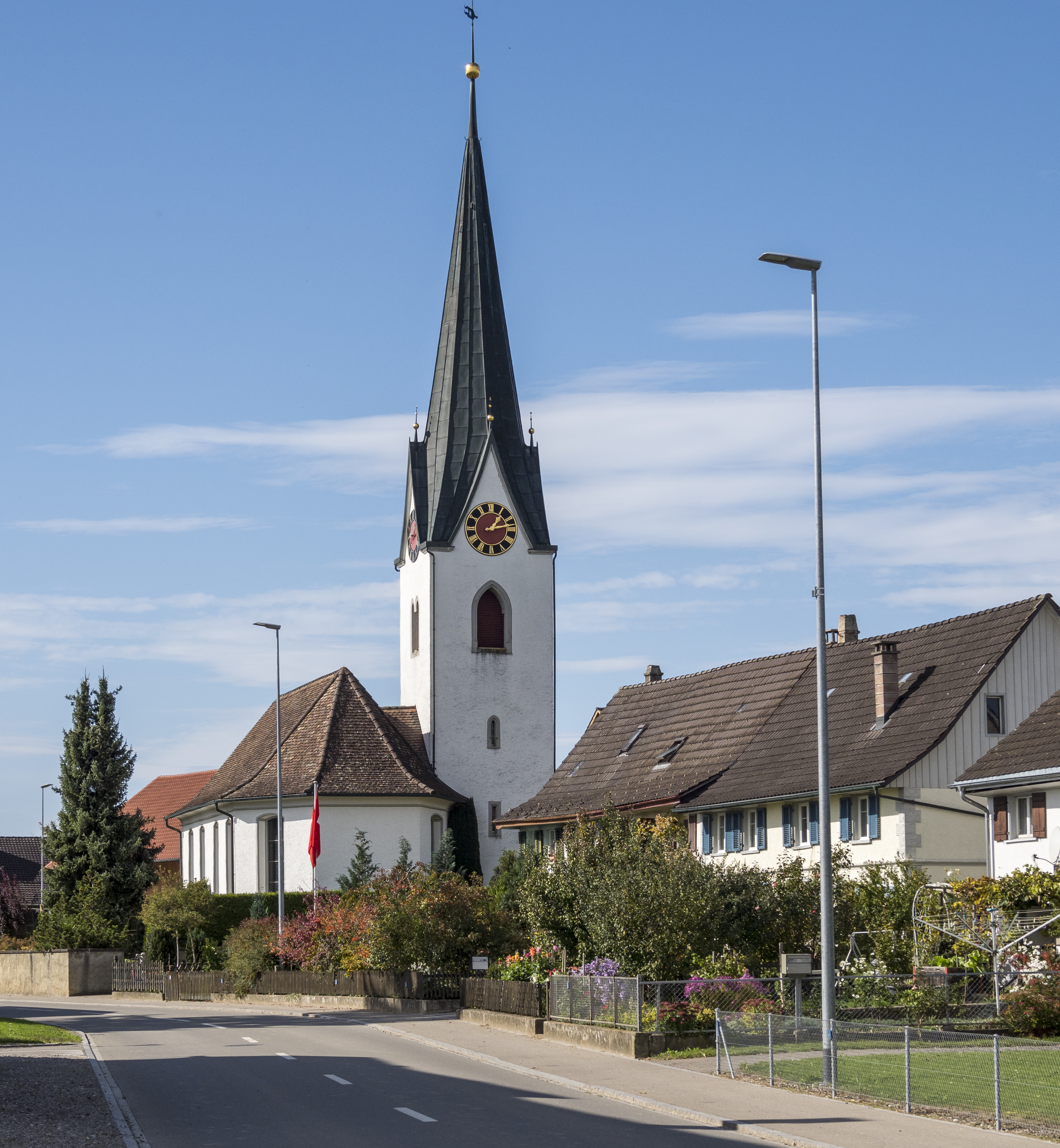

- Coat of arms
- Location of Birwinken
- Location within Switzerland Location within Canton of Thurgau
- Coordinates: 47°35′N 9°12′E
- Country: Switzerland
- Canton: Thurgau
- District: Weinfelden

Area
  - Total: 12.35 km^{2} (4.77 sq mi)
- Elevation: 550 m (1,800 ft)

Population (December 2007)
  - Total: 1,265
  - Density: 102.4/km^{2} (265.3/sq mi)
- Time zone: UTC+01:00 (CET)
  - Summer (DST): UTC+02:00 (CEST)
- Postal code: 8585
- SFOS number: 4901
- ISO 3166 code: CH-TG
- Localities: Klarsreuti, Andwil, Mattwil, Happerswil-Buch, Birwinken
- Surrounded by: Berg, Bürglen, Erlen, Langrickenbach, Lengwil, Sulgen
- Website: birwinken.ch

Birwinken is a municipality in the district of Weinfelden in the canton of Thurgau in Switzerland.

== History ==
Birwinken is probably first mentioned in 822 as Wirinchova. In 1275 it was mentioned as Birbichon.

In the 14th century, Birwinken and Dotnacht formed a distant part of the Herrschaft of Spiegelberg near Weingarten. Due to its location away from the rest of the Herrschaft it was sold to a number of other owners, before it was sold by the Muntprat family of Constance, in 1640, to the city of Zurich. The low court of Birrwinken became part of the property of the Vogt of Weinfelden in 1649. Through the court, the village remained tied to Weinfelden until 1798. Between 1803 and 1816 it was a district capital.

The village church is mentioned no later than the 12th century. By 1400, the parish was under the Augustinian monastery in Constance, and until the Protestant Reformation in 1529, was overseen by a monk. The church became a Reformed parish which included the village of Andwil. The parish remained independent until 1578, when it became a filial church of Langrickenbach. The Catholics in the village belonged to the parish of Berg after 1869.

In the 19th century the village economy add animal husbandry to the traditional agriculture and fruit growing. In 1878 a weaving and three embroidery factories provided 165 jobs. However, the decline of the textile industry in the 20th century and village's remoteness led to high levels of emigration. Due to the emigration, the village never developed much industry and has remained a mostly agricultural village. In 1990, 63% of the population worked in agriculture.

== Geography ==
Birwinken has an area, as of 2009, of 12.35 square kilometers (4.77 sq mi). Of this area, 9.39 km^{2} (3.63 sq mi) or 76.0% is used for agricultural purposes, while 2.01 km^{2} (0.78 sq mi) or 16.3% is forested. Of the rest of the land, 0.85 km^{2} (0.33 sq mi) or 6.9% is settled (buildings or roads), 0.05 km^{2} (12 acres) or 0.4% is either rivers or lakes.

Of the built up area, industrial buildings made up 3.5% of the total area while housing and buildings made up less than 0.1% and transportation infrastructure made up 0.2%. Parks, green belts and sports fields made up 3.0%. Out of the forested land, 14.3% of the total land area is heavily forested and 2.0% is covered with orchards or small clusters of trees. Of the agricultural land, 63.3% is used for growing crops, while 12.7% is used for orchards or vine crops. All the water in the municipality is flowing water.

The municipality is located in the Weinfelden district, on the southern slope of the Bodenseerücken mountains about 2 km (1.2 mi) east of Berg. It consists of the villages of Birwinken, Andwil, Happerswil-Buch, Klarsreuti and Mattwil.

== Demographics ==
Birwinken has a population (as of December 2020) of 1,330. As of 2008, 7.3% of the population are foreign nationals. Over the last 10 years (1997–2007) the population has changed at a rate of 8.1%. Most of the population (as of 2000) speaks German (96.9%), with Albanian being second most common ( 0.8%) and Italian being third ( 0.4%).

As of 2008, the gender distribution of the population was 51.0% male and 49.0% female. The population was made up of 614 Swiss men (47.1% of the population), and 51 (3.9%) non-Swiss men. There were 595 Swiss women (45.6%), and 44 (3.4%) non-Swiss women.

In 2008 there were 11 live births to Swiss citizens and births to non-Swiss citizens, and in same time span there were 9 deaths of Swiss citizens. Ignoring immigration and emigration, the population of Swiss citizens increased by 2 while the foreign population remained the same. There were 2 Swiss men who emigrated from Switzerland to another country, 4 Swiss women who emigrated from Switzerland to another country and 4 non-Swiss men who emigrated from Switzerland to another country. The total Swiss population change in 2008 (from all sources) was an increase of 28 and the non-Swiss population change was an increase of 5 people. This represents a population growth rate of 2.6%.

The age distribution, as of 2009, in Birwinken is; 161 children or 12.4% of the population are between 0 and 9 years old and 199 teenagers or 15.4% are between 10 and 19. Of the adult population, 130 people or 10.0% of the population are between 20 and 29 years old. 138 people or 10.6% are between 30 and 39, 228 people or 17.6% are between 40 and 49, and 190 people or 14.7% are between 50 and 59. The senior population distribution is 114 people or 8.8% of the population are between 60 and 69 years old, 77 people or 5.9% are between 70 and 79, there are 54 people or 4.2% who are between 80 and 89, and there are 5 people or 0.4% who are 90 and older.

As of 2000, there were 433 private households in the municipality, and an average of 2.7 persons per household. In 2000 there were 190 single family homes (or 82.3% of the total) out of a total of 231 inhabited buildings. There were 24 two family buildings (10.4%), 11 three family buildings (4.8%) and 6 multi-family buildings (or 2.6%). There were 254 (or 20.9%) persons who were part of a couple without children, and 766 (or 63.0%) who were part of a couple with children. There were 50 (or 4.1%) people who lived in single parent home, while there are 11 persons who were adult children living with one or both parents, 4 persons who lived in a household made up of relatives, 10 who lived in a household made up of unrelated persons, and 36 who are either institutionalized or live in another type of collective housing.

The vacancy rate for the municipality, in 2008, was 1.36%. As of 2007, the construction rate of new housing units was 2.4 new units per 1000 residents. In 2000 there were 483 apartments in the municipality. The most common apartment size was the 6 room apartment of which there were 142. There were 7 single room apartments and 142 apartments with six or more rooms. As of 2000 the average price to rent an average apartment in Birwinken was 1133.55 Swiss francs (CHF) per month (US$910, £510, €730 approx. exchange rate from 2000). The average rate for a one-room apartment was 900.00 CHF (US$720, £410, €580), a two-room apartment was about 743.00 CHF (US$590, £330, €480), a three-room apartment was about 970.00 CHF (US$780, £440, €620) and a six or more room apartment cost an average of 1435.33 CHF (US$1150, £650, €920). The average apartment price in Birwinken was 101.6% of the national average of 1116 CHF.

In the 2007 federal election the most popular party was the SVP which received 56.36% of the vote. The next three most popular parties were the Green Party (11.74%), the CVP (9.65%) and the SP (8.6%). In the federal election, a total of 462 votes were cast, and the voter turnout was 53.1%.

The historical population is given in the following table:

year	population
1850	1,333
1888	1,604
1900	1,407
1941	1,202
1950	1,261
1990	1,213
2000	1,216

== Economy ==
As of 2007, Birwinken had an unemployment rate of 0.93%. As of 2005, there were 171 people employed in the primary economic sector and about 56 businesses involved in this sector. 53 people are employed in the secondary sector and there are 15 businesses in this sector. 97 people are employed in the tertiary sector, with 32 businesses in this sector.

In 2000 there were 852 workers who lived in the municipality. Of these, 424 or about 49.8% of the residents worked outside Birwinken while 69 people commuted into the municipality for work. There were a total of 497 jobs (of at least 6 hours per week) in the municipality. Of the working population, 4.4% used public transportation to get to work, and 52% used a private car.

== Religion ==
From the 2000 census, 246 or 20.2% were Roman Catholic, while 694 or 57.1% belonged to the Swiss Reformed Church. Of the rest of the population, there is 1 individual who belongs to the Orthodox Church, and there are 85 individuals (or about 6.99% of the population) who belong to another Christian church. There were 19 (or about 1.56% of the population) who are Islamic. 105 (or about 8.63% of the population) belong to no church, are agnostic or atheist, and 66 individuals (or about 5.43% of the population) did not answer the question.

== Education ==
The entire Swiss population is generally well educated. In Birwinken about 74.5% of the population (between age 25 and 64) have completed either non-mandatory upper secondary education or additional higher education (either University or a Fachhochschule).

Birwinken is home to the Berg-Birwinken primary and secondary school district. In the 2008/2009 school year there were 471 students at either the primary or secondary levels. There were 102 children in the kindergarten, and the average class size was 20.4 kindergartners. Of the children in kindergarten, 55 or 53.9% were female, 11 or 10.8% were not Swiss citizens and 6 or 5.9% did not speak German natively. The lower and upper primary levels begin at about age 5-6 and last for 6 years. There were 160 children in who were at the lower primary level and 152 children in the upper primary level. The average class size in the primary school was 21.29 students. At the lower primary level, there were 77 children or 48.1% of the total population who were female, 15 or 9.4% were not Swiss citizens and 10 or 6.3% did not speak German natively. In the upper primary level, there were 71 or 46.7% who were female, 13 or 8.6% were not Swiss citizens and 5 or 3.3% did not speak German natively.

At the secondary level, students are divided according to performance. The secondary level begins at about age 12 and usually lasts 3 years. There were 102 teenagers who were in the advanced school, of which 55 or 53.9% were female, 3 or 2.9% were not Swiss citizens. There were 57 teenagers who were in the standard school, of which 26 or 45.6% were female, 5 or 8.8% were not Swiss citizens and 4 or 7.0% did not speak German natively. The average class size for all classes at the secondary level was 17.67 students.
