= Bottighofen =

- Municipality
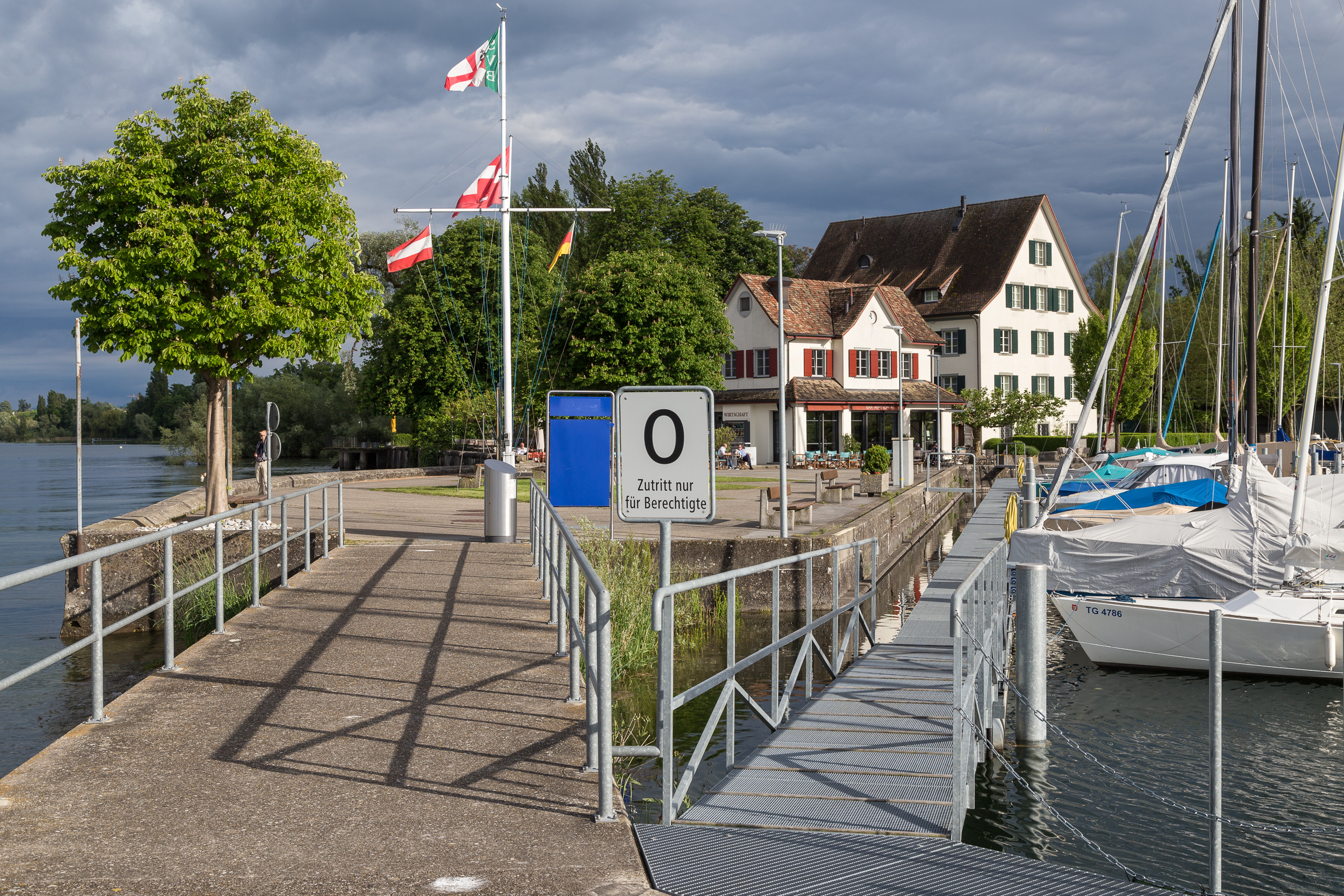
- Bottighofen marina

- Flag Coat of arms
- Location of Bottighofen
- Location within Switzerland Location within Canton of Thurgau
- Coordinates: 47°38′N 9°12′E
- Country: Switzerland
- Canton: Thurgau
- District: Kreuzlingen

Area
  - Total: 2.4 km^{2} (0.93 sq mi)
- Elevation: 409 m (1,342 ft)

Population (2007)
  - Total: 2,007
  - Density: 840/km^{2} (2,200/sq mi)
- Time zone: UTC+01:00 (CET)
  - Summer (DST): UTC+02:00 (CEST)
- Postal code: 8598
- SFOS number: 4643
- ISO 3166 code: CH-TG
- Localities: Chli Rigi, Rüti
- Surrounded by: Konstanz (DE), Kreuzlingen, Lengwil, Meersburg (DE), Münsterlingen
- Website: www.bottighofen.ch

Bottighofen is a municipality in the district of Kreuzlingen in the canton of Thurgau in Switzerland.

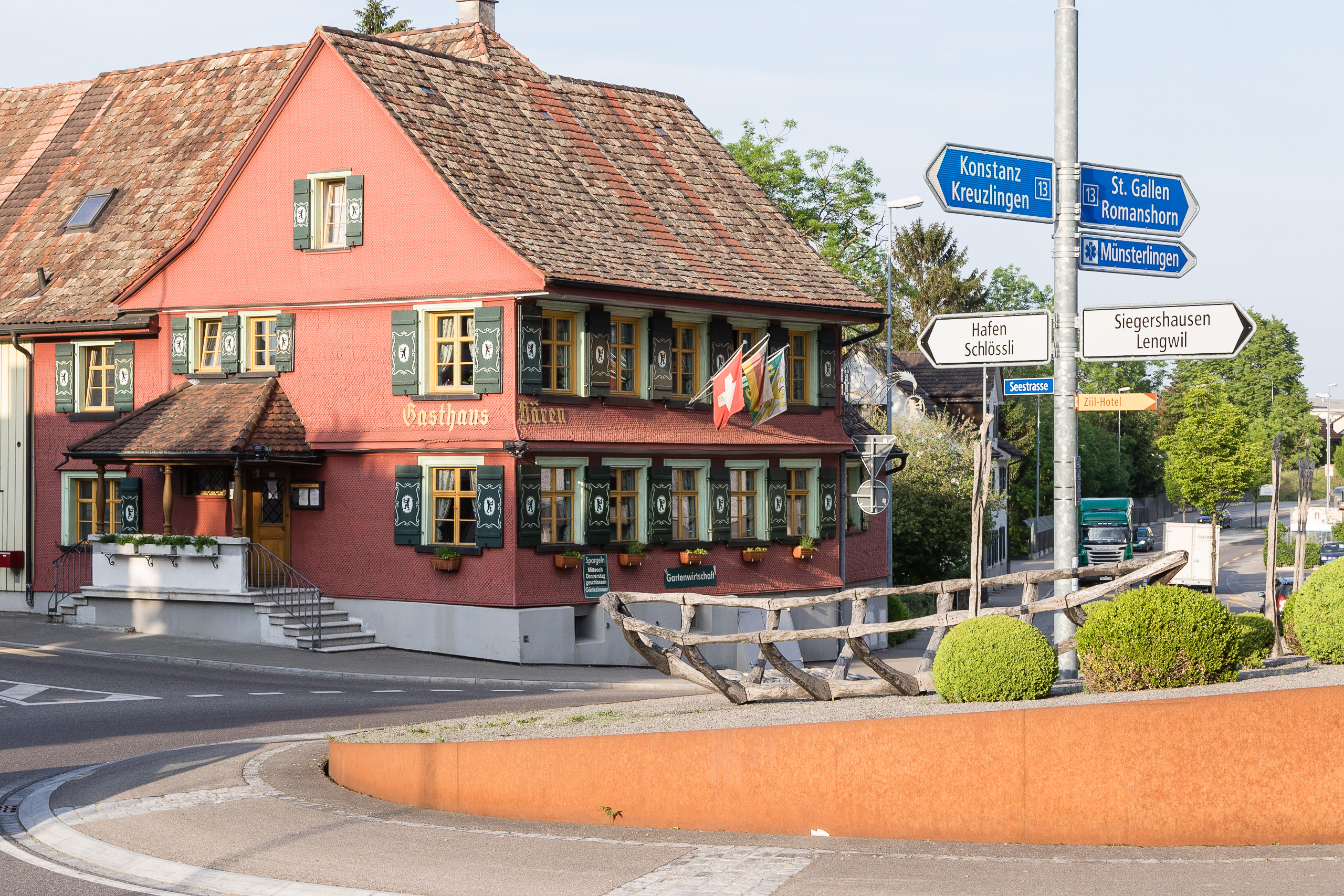
Baeren Inn Bottighofen

== History ==
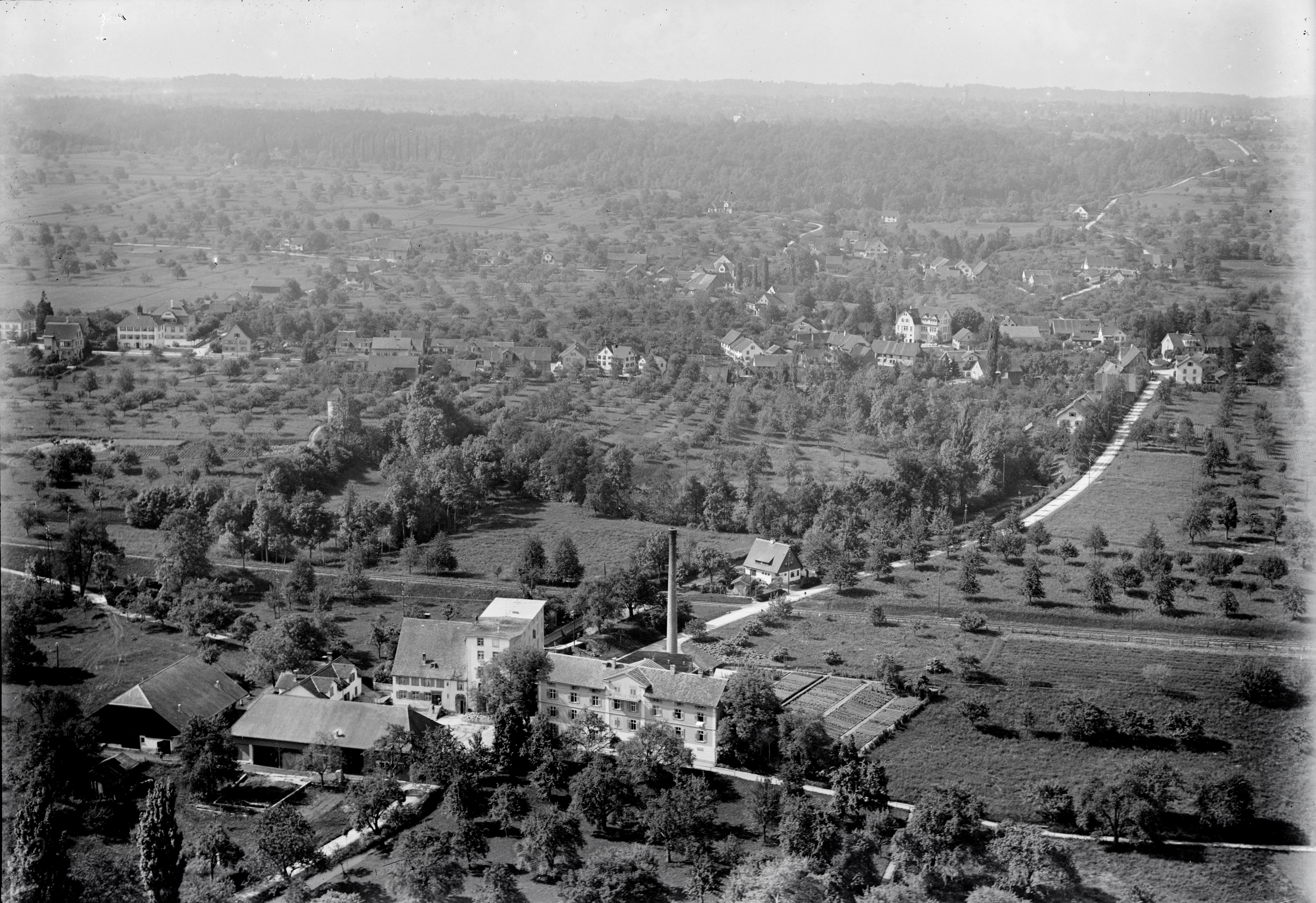
Aerial view from 300 m by Walter Mittelholzer (1924)

There was a small, prehistoric lake-front settlement near the village. The modern village of Bottighofen is first mentioned in 830 as Pottinchovum. The main landlord for the village, was the monastery of Münsterlingen, from the High Middle Ages until the 19th century. Until 1798, it belonged to the bailiwick of Eggen.

Bottighofen was part of the parish of Münsterlingen, which was restored after the resumption of monastic life in 1549/51. In 1594 the majority Reformed residents were assigned to the parish of Scherzingen.

In the 19th century, the main businesses were in milling, farming and viticulture as well as some timber trade. In the 20th century some small businesses settled in the village. In 1990, 35% of workforce were in the manufacturing sector, and 57% were in the services sector. Due to strong population growth since 1960, the village became an independent municipality in 1994.

== Geography ==
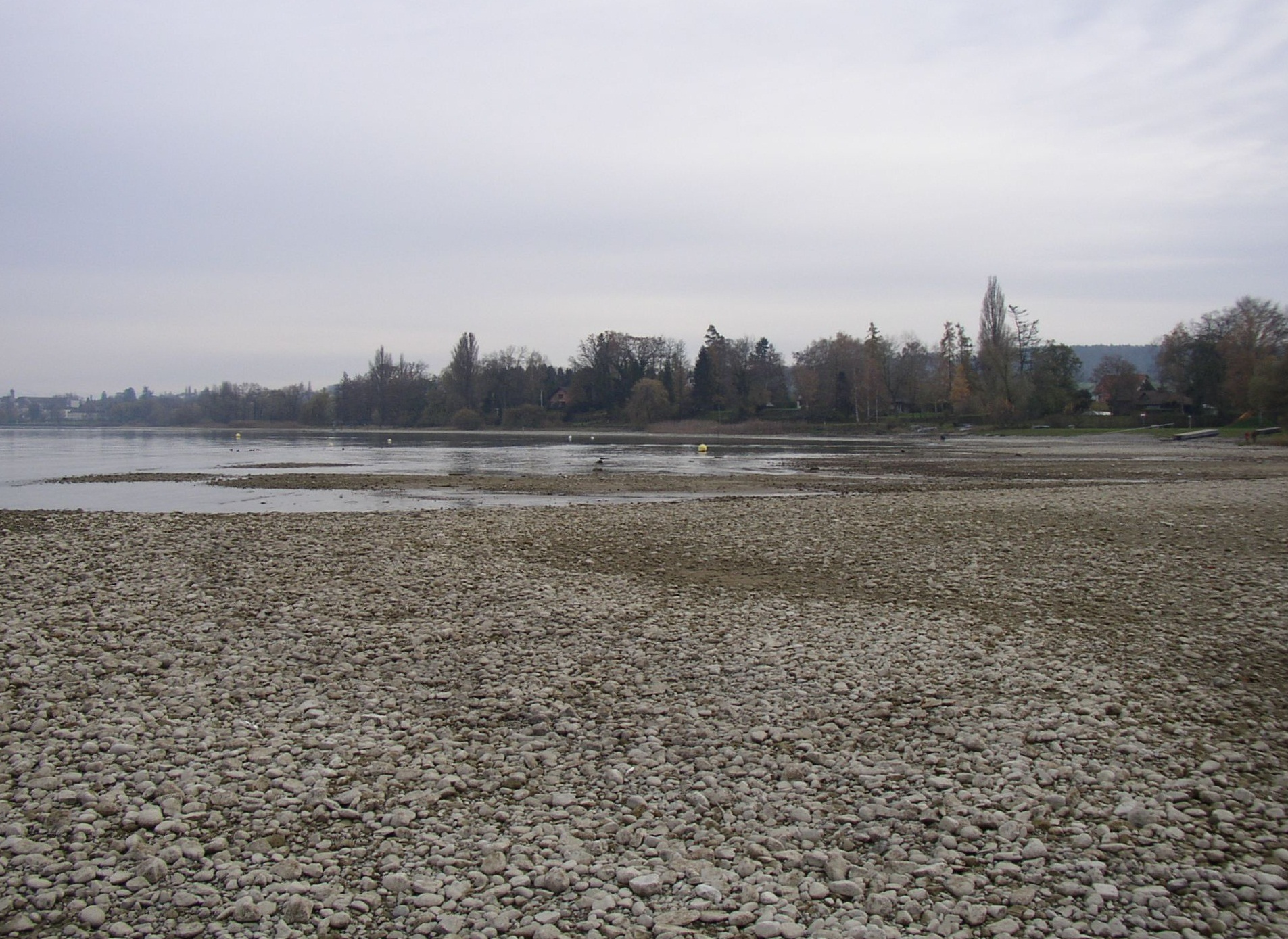
Lake Constance in Bottighofen

Bottighofen has an area, as of 2009, of 2.39 square kilometers (0.92 sq mi). Of this area, 0.95 km^{2} (0.37 sq mi) or 39.7% is used for agricultural purposes, while 0.83 km^{2} (0.32 sq mi) or 34.7% is forested. Of the rest of the land, 0.61 km^{2} (0.24 sq mi) or 25.5% is settled (buildings or roads), 0.01 km^{2} (2.5 acres) or 0.4% is either rivers or lakes.

Of the built up area, industrial buildings made up 15.1% of the total area while housing and buildings made up 1.3% and transportation infrastructure made up 2.5%. Power and water infrastructure as well as other special developed areas made up 1.3% of the area while parks, green belts and sports fields made up 5.4%. Out of the forested land, 31.0% of the total land area is heavily forested and 3.8% is covered with orchards or small clusters of trees. Of the agricultural land, 37.2% is used for growing crops, while 2.5% is used for orchards or vine crops. All the water in the municipality is flowing water.

The municipality is located in the Kreuzlingen district between Kreuzlingen and Münsterlingen along Lake Constance, across the border from Konstanz in Germany.

== Demographics ==
Bottighofen has a population (as of December 2020) of 2,397. As of 2008, 26.4% of the population are foreign nationals. Over the last 10 years (1997–2007) the population has changed at a rate of 29.4%. Most of the population (as of 2000) speaks German (92.8%), with Italian being second most common (1.5%) and Albanian being third (1.1%).

As of 2008, the gender distribution of the population was 50.6% male and 49.4% female. The population was made up of 758 Swiss men (36.7% of the population), and 287 (13.9%) non-Swiss men. There were 763 Swiss women (36.9%), and 258 (12.5%) non-Swiss women.

In 2008 there were 18 live births to Swiss citizens and 3 births to non-Swiss citizens, and in same time span there were 15 deaths of Swiss citizens. Ignoring immigration and emigration, the population of Swiss citizens increased by 3 while the foreign population increased by 3. There were 1 Swiss woman who emigrated from Switzerland to another country, 32 non-Swiss men who emigrated from Switzerland to another country and 36 non-Swiss women who emigrated from Switzerland to another country. The total Swiss population change in 2008 (from all sources) was an increase of 6 and the non-Swiss population change was an increase of 71 people. This represents a population growth rate of 3.9%.

The age distribution, as of 2009, in Bottighofen is; 198 children or 9.5% of the population are between 0 and 9 years old and 164 teenagers or 7.9% are between 10 and 19. Of the adult population, 193 people or 9.3% of the population are between 20 and 29 years old. 270 people or 13.0% are between 30 and 39, 379 people or 18.2% are between 40 and 49, and 323 people or 15.5% are between 50 and 59. The senior population distribution is 305 people or 14.7% of the population are between 60 and 69 years old, 172 people or 8.3% are between 70 and 79, there are 71 people or 3.4% who are between 80 and 89, and there are 4 people or 0.2% who are 90 and older.

As of 2000, there were 731 private households in the municipality, and an average of 2.3 persons per household. In 2000 there were 298 single family homes (or 81.2% of the total) out of a total of 367 inhabited buildings. There were 26 two family buildings (7.1%), 10 three family buildings (2.7%) and 33 multi-family buildings (or 9.0%). There were 518 (or 30.8%) persons who were part of a couple without children, and 834 (or 49.5%) who were part of a couple with children. There were 68 (or 4.0%) people who lived in single parent home, while there are 4 persons who were adult children living with one or both parents, 9 persons who lived in a household made up of relatives, 17 who lived in a household made up of unrelated persons, and 17 who are either institutionalized or live in another type of collective housing.

The vacancy rate for the municipality, in 2008, was 0.94%. As of 2007, the construction rate of new housing units was 31.2 new units per 1000 residents. In 2000 there were 794 apartments in the municipality. The most common apartment size was the 4 room apartment of which there were 241. There were 15 single room apartments and 177 apartments with six or more rooms. As of 2000 the average price to rent an average apartment in Bottighofen was 1303.11 Swiss francs (CHF) per month (US$1040, £590, €830 approx. exchange rate from 2000). The average rate for a one-room apartment was 565.00 CHF (US$450, £250, €360), a two-room apartment was about 824.82 CHF (US$660, £370, €530), a three-room apartment was about 1051.64 CHF (US$840, £470, €670) and a six or more room apartment cost an average of 1814.59 CHF (US$1450, £820, €1160). The average apartment price in Bottighofen was 116.8% of the national average of 1116 CHF.

In the 2007 federal election the most popular party was the SVP which received 37.35% of the vote. The next three most popular parties were the FDP (20.92%), the CVP (13.33%) and the Green Party (11.76%). In the federal election, a total of 652 votes were cast, and the voter turnout was 50.3%.

The historical population is given in the following table:

year	population
1850	483
1900	488
1950	572
1990	1,156
1990	1,156
2000	1,684

== Economy ==
As of 2007, Bottighofen had an unemployment rate of 1.76%. As of 2005, there were 48 people employed in the primary economic sector and about 6 businesses involved in this sector. 59 people are employed in the secondary sector and there are 13 businesses in this sector. 230 people are employed in the tertiary sector, with 76 businesses in this sector.

In 2000 there were 1,193 workers who lived in the municipality. Of these, 760 or about 63.7% of the residents worked outside Bottighofen while 174 people commuted into the municipality for work. There were a total of 607 jobs (of at least 6 hours per week) in the municipality. Of the working population, 5.9% used public transportation to get to work, and 62.1% used a private car.

== Religion ==
From the 2000 census, 535 or 31.8% were Roman Catholic, while 865 or 51.4% belonged to the Swiss Reformed Church. Of the rest of the population, there was 1 Old Catholic who belonged to the Christian Catholic Church of Switzerland there are 20 individuals (or about 1.19% of the population) who belong to the Orthodox Church, and there are 21 individuals (or about 1.25% of the population) who belong to another Christian church. There were 25 (or about 1.48% of the population) who are Islamic. There are 9 individuals (or about 0.53% of the population) who belong to another church (not listed on the census), 167 (or about 9.92% of the population) belong to no church, are agnostic or atheist, and 41 individuals (or about 2.43% of the population) did not answer the question.

== Transport ==
Bottighofen sits on the Lake Line between Schaffhausen and Rorschach and is served by the St. Gallen S-Bahn at Bottighofen railway station.

== Education ==
The entire Swiss population is generally well educated. In Bottighofen about 84.8% of the population (between age 25 and 64) have completed either non-mandatory upper secondary education or additional higher education (either university or a Fachhochschule).

Bottighofen is home to the Bottighofen primary school district. In the 2008/2009 school year there were 137 students. There were 44 children in the kindergarten, and the average class size was 22 kindergartners. Of the children in kindergarten, 21 or 47.7% were female, 12 or 27.3% were not Swiss citizens and 3 or 6.8% did not speak German natively. The lower and upper primary levels begin at about age 5-6 and last for 6 years. There were 45 children in who were at the lower primary level and 48 children in the upper primary level. The average class size in the primary school was 18.6 students. At the lower primary level, there were 23 children or 51.1% of the total population who were female, 12 or 26.7% were not Swiss citizens . In the upper primary level, there were 20 or 41.7% who were female, 10 or 20.8% were not Swiss citizens and 1 or 2.1% did not speak German natively.
