= Dettighofen, Switzerland =

Village in Thurgau, Switzerland

Coordinates: 47°36′59.99″N 8°56′54.73″E

Dettighofen (German pronunciation: [dɛtɪçˈhoːfn̩]) is a village in the Swiss canton of Thurgau. Since 1998, it is part of the municipality of Pfyn.
