= Hagnau am Bodensee =

- Municipality
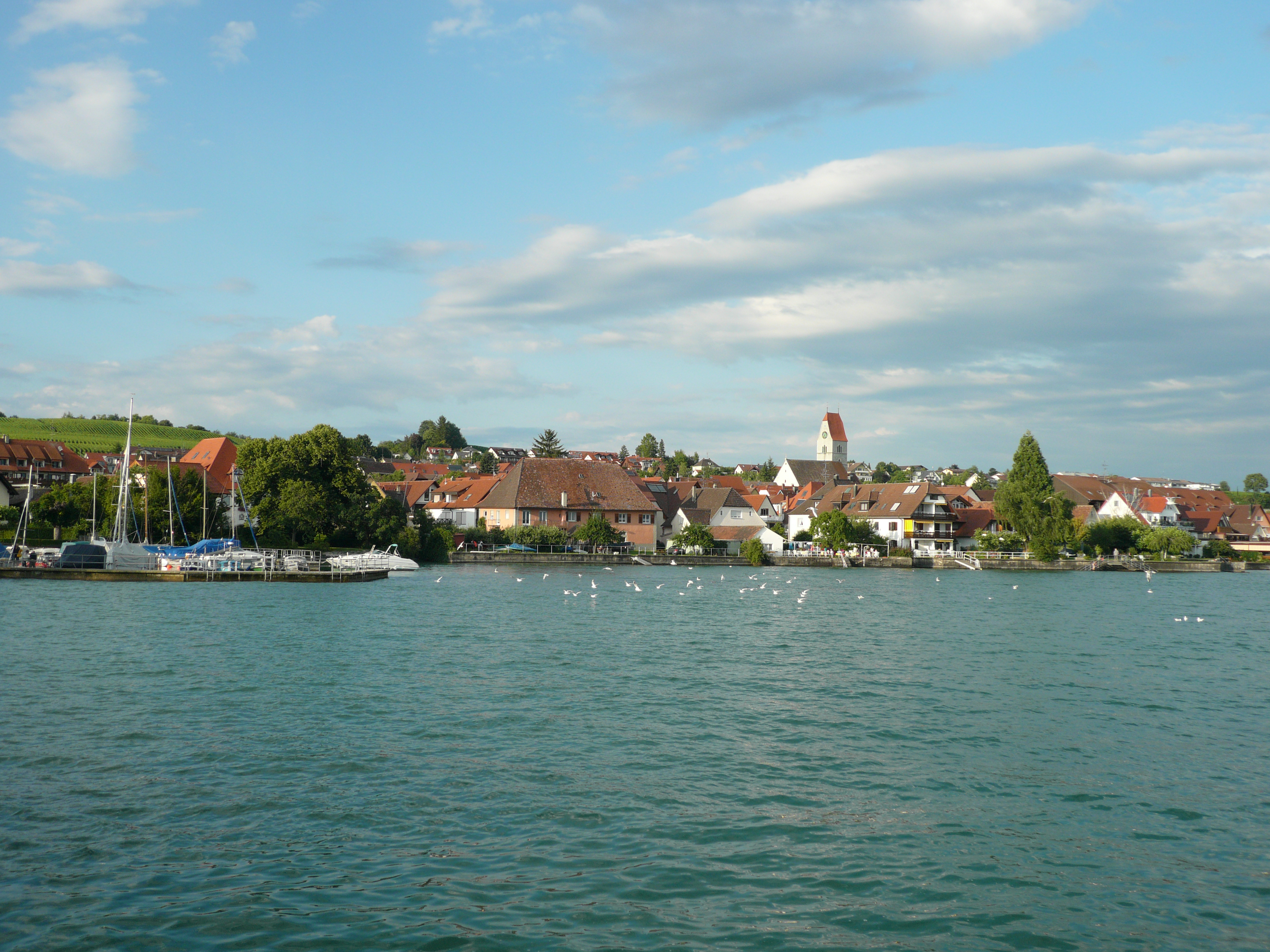
- Hagnau am Bodensee

- Coat of arms

- Location of Hagnau am Bodensee within Bodenseekreis district
- Interactive map of Hagnau am Bodensee
- Location within Germany Location within Baden-Württemberg
- Coordinates: 47°40′30″N 09°19′00″E
- Country: Germany
- State: Baden-Württemberg
- Admin. region: Tübingen
- District: Bodenseekreis
- Municipal assoc.: Meersburg

Government
  - Mayor (2023–31): Volker Frede (Ind.)

Area
  - Total: 2.93 km^{2} (1.13 sq mi)
- Elevation: 393 m (1,289 ft)

Population (2025-12-31)
  - Total: 1,388
  - Density: 474/km^{2} (1,230/sq mi)
- Time zone: UTC+01:00 (CET)
  - Summer (DST): UTC+02:00 (CEST)
- Postal codes: 88709
- Dialling codes: 07532
- Vehicle registration: FN
- Website: www.hagnau.de

Hagnau am Bodensee is a commune and a village in the district of Bodensee in Baden-Württemberg in Germany. It lies on the north shore of Lake Constance (Bodensee in German).
