= Uttwil railway station =

Railway station in Switzerland

Uttwil
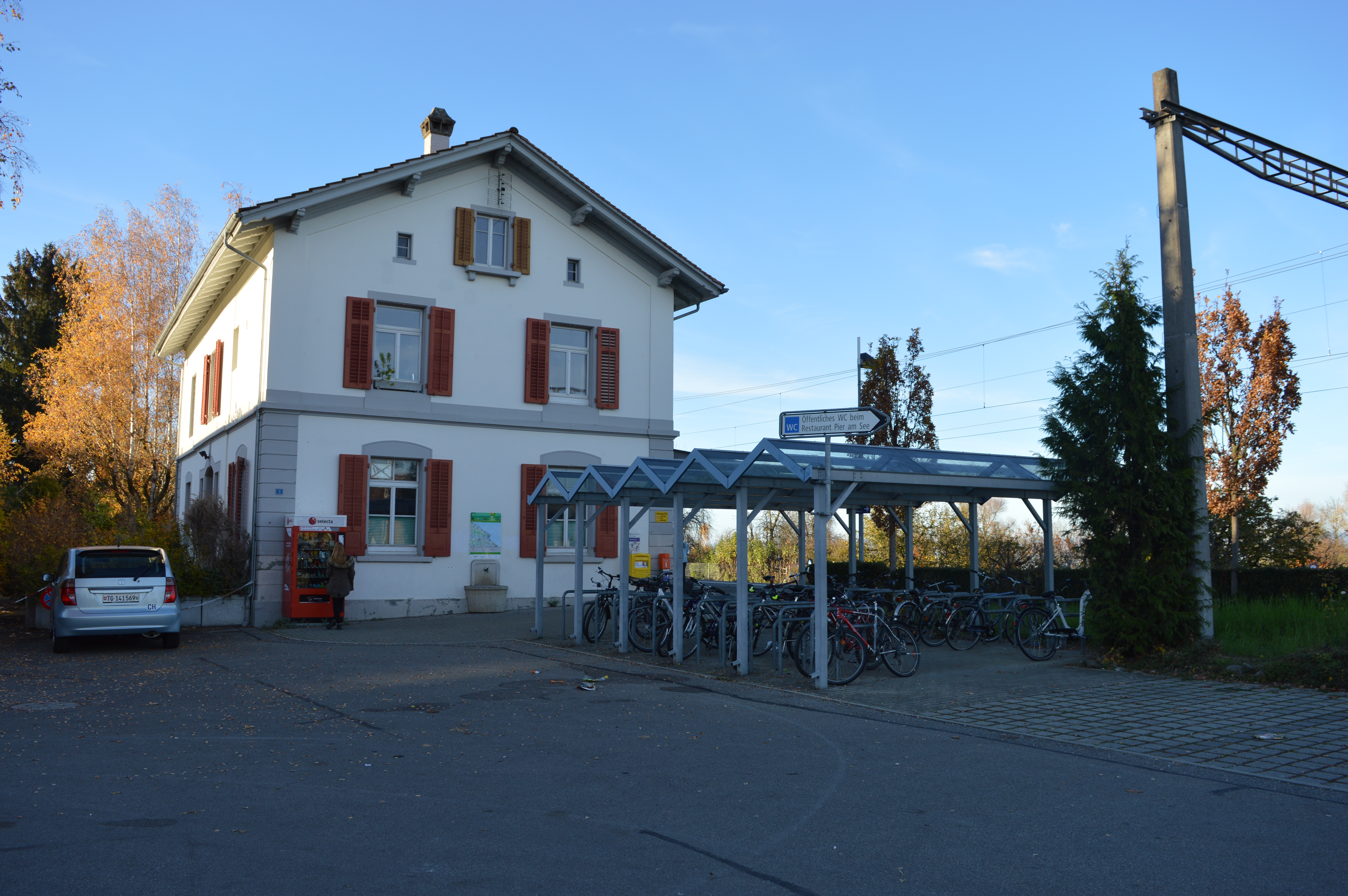
- The station building in 2015

General information
- Location: Uttwil; Switzerland
- Coordinates: 47°35′14″N 9°20′11″E
- Elevation: 406 m (1,332 ft)
- Owner: Swiss Federal Railways
- Line: Lake line
- Train operators: Thurbo

Other information
- Fare zone: 227 (Tarifverbund Ostschweiz)

Services
| Preceding station | St. Gallen S-Bahn | Following station |
|---|---|---|
| Kesswil towards Schaffhausen | S1 | Romanshorn towards Wil |
| Kesswil towards Kreuzlingen | SN71 Limited service | Romanshorn Terminus |
Location
- Location within Switzerland Location within Canton of Thurgau

Uttwil railway station (German: Bahnhof Uttwil) is a railway station in Uttwil, in the Swiss canton of Thurgau. It is an intermediate stop on the Lake line and is served as a request stop by local trains only.

== Services ==
Uttwil is served by the S1 of the St. Gallen S-Bahn:

- S1: half-hourly service between Schaffhausen and Wil via St. Gallen.

During weekends, the station is served by a nighttime S-Bahn service (SN71), offered by Ostwind fare network, and operated by Thurbo for St. Gallen S-Bahn.

- St. Gallen S-Bahn SN71: hourly service to Romanshorn and to Kreuzlingen.

== See also ==
- Bodensee S-Bahn
- Rail transport in Switzerland
