= Landschlacht railway station =

Train station in Switzerland

Landschlacht
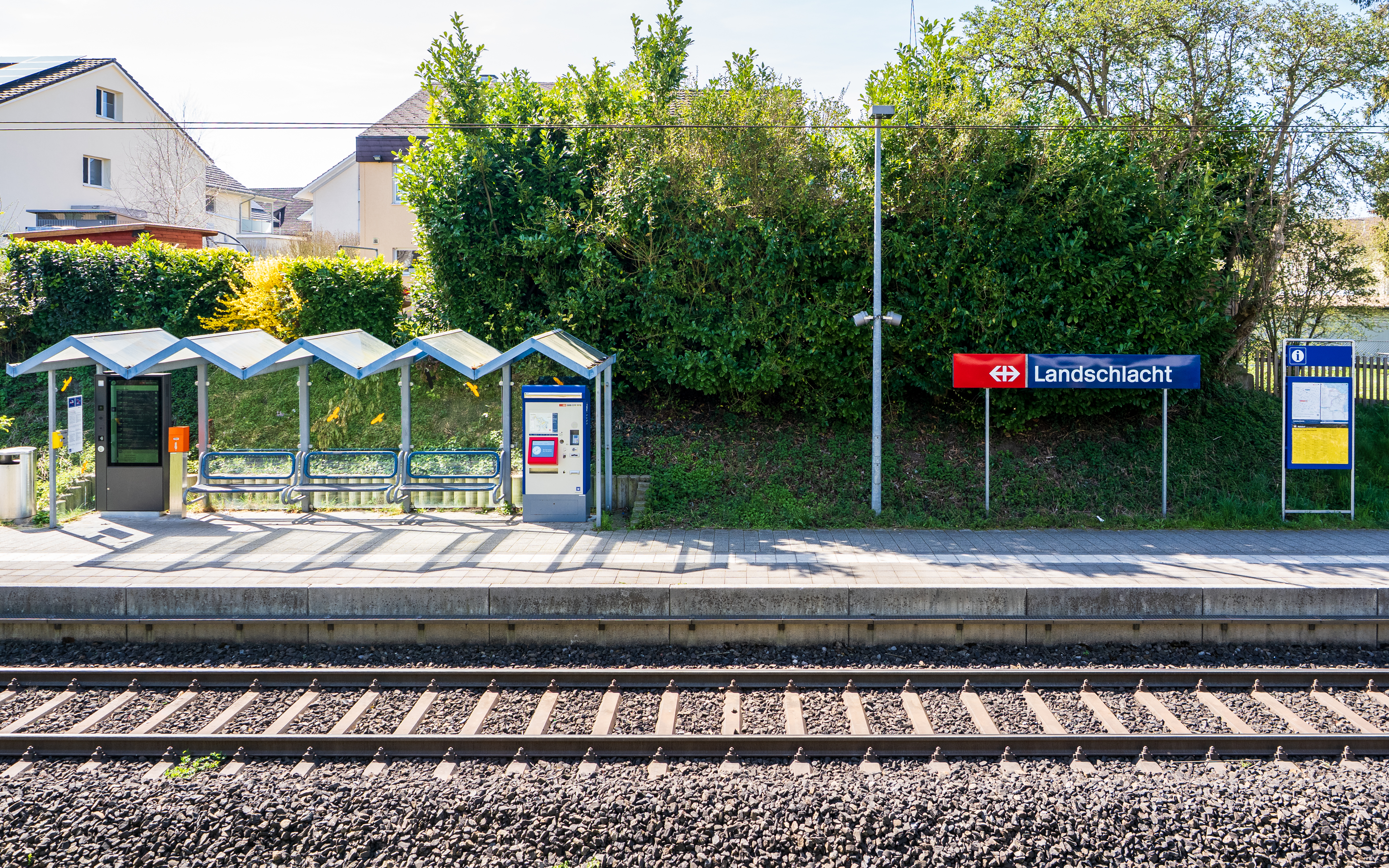

General information
- Location: Münsterlingen; Switzerland
- Coordinates: 47°37′44.022″N 9°14′48.984″E
- Elevation: 409 m (1,342 ft)
- Owner: Swiss Federal Railways
- Line: Lake line
- Train operators: Thurbo

Other information
- Fare zone: 255 (Tarifverbund Ostschweiz)

Services
Preceding station	St. Gallen S-Bahn	Following station
Münsterlingen Spital towards Schaffhausen	S1	Altnau towards Wil
Münsterlingen Spital towards Kreuzlingen	SN71 Limited service	Altnau towards Romanshorn
Location
- Location within Switzerland Location within Canton of Thurgau

Landschlacht railway station (German: Bahnhof Landschlacht) is a railway station in Münsterlingen, in the Swiss canton of Thurgau. It is an intermediate stop on the Lake line and is served as a request stop by local trains only. It is one of three stations in the municipality of Münsterlingen.

== Services ==
Landschlacht is served by the S1 of the St. Gallen S-Bahn:

- S1: half-hourly service between Schaffhausen and Wil via St. Gallen.

During weekends, the station is served by a nighttime S-Bahn service (SN71), offered by Ostwind fare network, and operated by Thurbo for St. Gallen S-Bahn.

- St. Gallen S-Bahn SN71: hourly service to Romanshorn and to Kreuzlingen.

== See also ==
- Bodensee S-Bahn
- Rail transport in Switzerland
