= Altnau railway station =

Railway station in Switzerland

Altnau
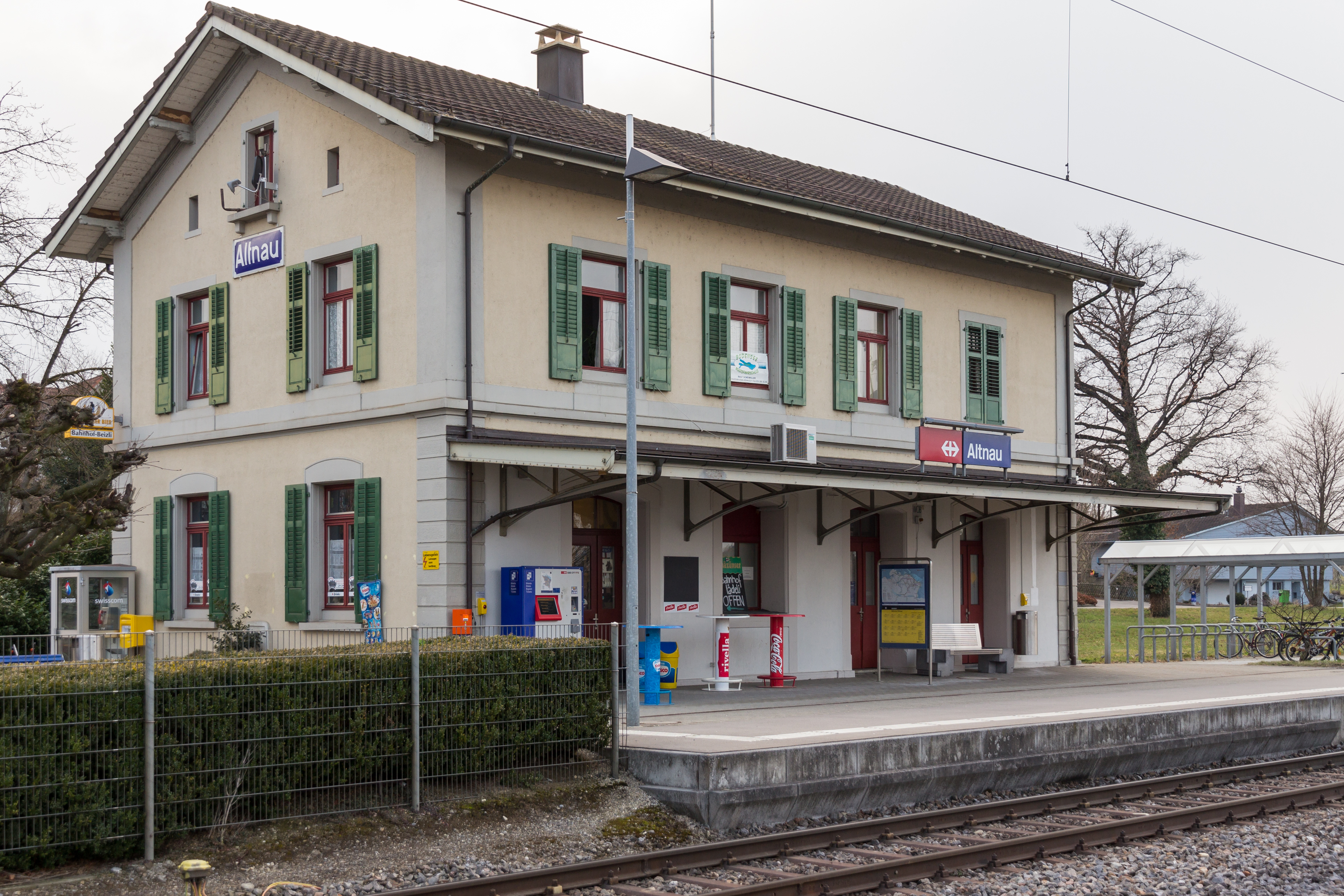
- The station building in 2012

General information
- Location: Altnau; Switzerland
- Coordinates: 47°37′10″N 9°15′46″E
- Elevation: 409 m (1,342 ft)
- Owner: Swiss Federal Railways
- Line: Lake line
- Train operators: Thurbo

Other information
- Fare zone: 257 (Tarifverbund Ostschweiz)

Services
Preceding station	St. Gallen S-Bahn	Following station
Landschlacht towards Schaffhausen	S1	Güttingen towards Wil
Landschlacht towards Kreuzlingen	SN71 Limited service	Güttingen towards Romanshorn
Location
- Location within Switzerland Location within Canton of Thurgau

Altnau railway station (German: Bahnhof Altnau) is a railway station in Altnau, in the Swiss canton of Thurgau. It is an intermediate stop on the Lake line and is served as a request stop by local trains only.

== Services ==
Altnau is served by the S1 of the St. Gallen S-Bahn:

- S1: half-hourly service between Schaffhausen and Wil via St. Gallen.

During weekends, the station is served by a nighttime S-Bahn service (SN71), offered by Ostwind fare network, and operated by Thurbo for St. Gallen S-Bahn.

- St. Gallen S-Bahn SN71: hourly service to Romanshorn and to Kreuzlingen.

== See also ==
- Bodensee S-Bahn
- Rail transport in Switzerland
