= Münsterlingen-Scherzingen railway station =

Train station in Switzerland

Münsterlingen-Scherzingen
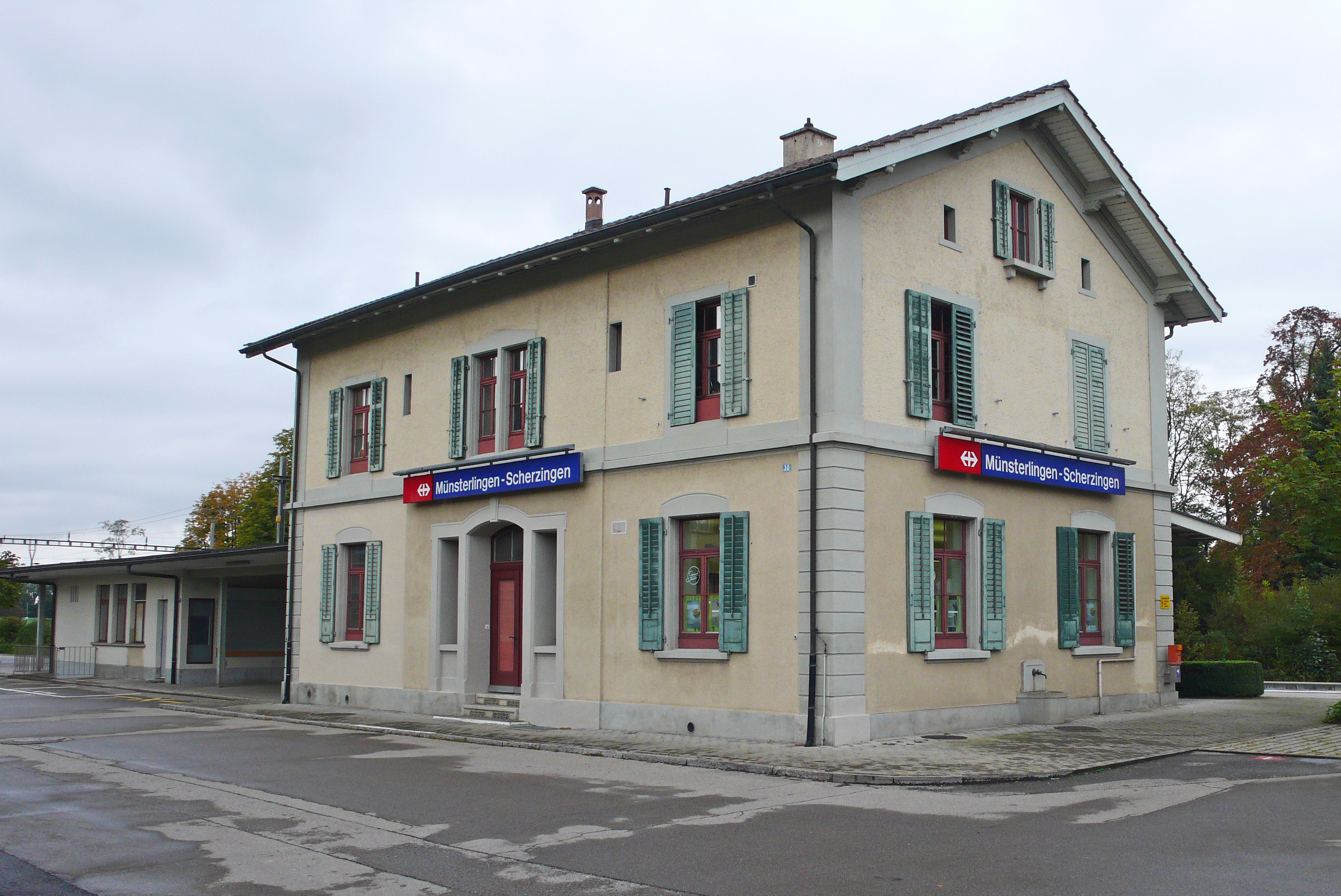
- The station building in 2011

General information
- Location: Münsterlingen; Switzerland
- Coordinates: 47°38′0.326″N 9°13′37.193″E
- Elevation: 405 m (1,329 ft)
- Owner: Swiss Federal Railways
- Line: Lake line
- Train operators: Thurbo

Other information
- Fare zone: 255 (Tarifverbund Ostschweiz)

Services
Preceding station	St. Gallen S-Bahn	Following station
Bottighofen towards Schaffhausen	S1	Münsterlingen Spital towards Wil
Bottighofen towards Kreuzlingen	SN71 Limited service	Münsterlingen Spital towards Romanshorn
Location
- Location within Switzerland Location within Canton of Thurgau

Münsterlingen-Scherzingen railway station (German: Bahnhof Münsterlingen-Scherzingen) is a railway station in Münsterlingen, in the Swiss canton of Thurgau. It is an intermediate stop on the Lake line and is served as a request stop by local trains only. It is one of three stations in the municipality of Münsterlingen.

== Services ==
Münsterlingen-Scherzingen is served by the S1 of the St. Gallen S-Bahn:

- S1: half-hourly service between Schaffhausen and Wil via St. Gallen.

During weekends, the station is served by a nighttime S-Bahn service (SN71), offered by Ostwind fare network, and operated by Thurbo for St. Gallen S-Bahn.

- St. Gallen S-Bahn SN71: hourly service to Romanshorn and to Kreuzlingen.

== See also ==
- Bodensee S-Bahn
- Rail transport in Switzerland
